= 2026 Indiana State Sycamores football team =

American college football season

2026 Indiana State Sycamores football
- Conference: Missouri Valley Football Conference
- Record: 2–10 (0–8 MVFC)
- Head coach: Curt Mallory (9th season)
- Offensive coordinator: John Bear (2nd season)
- Defensive coordinator: Steve Morrison (1st season)
- Home stadium: Memorial Stadium

2026 Missouri Valley Football Conference standings
	Conf.			Overall
Team	W		L	W		L
No. 3 South Dakota State $^	7	–	1	10	–	2
No. 6 Youngstown State	6	–	2	8	–	3
No. 7 South Dakota	6	–	2	9	–	3
No. 10 North Dakota	5	–	3	8	–	4
No. 11 Illinois State	4	–	4	8	–	4
Southern Illinois	3	–	5	5	–	7
Northern Iowa	3	–	5	4	–	7
Murray State	2	–	6	3	–	9
Indiana State	0	–	8	2	–	10
$ – Conference champion; ^ – FCS playoff participant; As of November 22, 2026; Rankings from STATS Poll

The 2026 Indiana State Sycamores football team represented Indiana State University as a member of the Missouri Valley Football Conference (MVFC) during the 2026 NCAA Division I FCS football season. The Sycamores were led by ninth-year head coach Curt Mallory, and played home games at Memorial Stadium in Terre Haute, Indiana.

== Preseason ==
=== MVFC poll ===
The Missouri Valley Football Conference release its preseason poll on July 14, 2026, voted on by league athletic directors, coaches, and media members. The Sycamores were predicted to finish eighth in the conference.

== Schedule ==
Date	Time	Opponent	Site	TV	Result	Attendance
August 29	6:00 p.m.	Southeast Missouri State*	Memorial Stadium; Terre Haute, IN	ESPN+	L 21–23	5,521
September 4	7:00 p.m.	at Purdue*	Ross-Ade Stadium; West Lafayette, IN	BTN	L 19–44	49,019
September 12	7:00 p.m.	at Eastern Illinois*	O'Brien Field; Charleston, IL	ESPN+	W 42–35	6,971
September 19	1:00 p.m.	Valparaiso*	Memorial Stadium; Terre Haute, IN	ESPN+	W 39–16	3,497
September 26	1:00 p.m.	No. 7 North Dakota	Memorial Stadium; Terre Haute, IN	ESPN+	L 35–42	2,765
October 3	4:00 p.m.	at No. 13 South Dakota	DakotaDome; Vermillion, SD	ESPN+	L 14–44	9,002
October 10	1:00 p.m.	No. 8 Youngstown State^{†}	Memorial Stadium; Terre Haute, IN	ESPN+	L 24–57	4,428
October 24	3:00 p.m.	at No. 10 Illinois State	Hancock Stadium; Normal, IL	ESPN+	L 10–17	11,280
October 31	2:00 p.m.	at Northern Iowa	UNI-Dome; Cedar Falls, IA	ESPN+	L 23–45	7,320
November 7	6:00 p.m.	Southern Illinois	Memorial Stadium; Terre Haute, IN	ESPN+	L 20–37	3,247
November 14	1:00 p.m.	Murray State	Memorial Stadium; Terre Haute, IN	ESPN+	L 14–44	2,666
November 21	3:00 p.m.	at No. 3 South Dakota State	Dana J. Dykhouse Stadium; Brookings, SD	ESPN+	L 13–52	12,148
*Non-conference game; ^{†}Homecoming; Rankings from STATS Poll released prior to the game; All times are in Eastern time

== Game summaries ==
=== Southeast Missouri State ===
Southeast Missouri State Redhawks (0–0) at Indiana State Sycamores (0–0) – Game summary

Quarter	1	2	3	4	Total
Redhawks	7	3	7	6	23
Sycamores	0	7	7	7	21

at Memorial Stadium • Terre Haute, Indiana

- Date: August 29
- Game time: 6:00 p.m.
- Game weather: Sunny • Temperature: 83 °F (28 °C)
- Game attendance: 5,521
- Referee: Jason Perkins
- TV announcers (ESPN+): Brian Jennings and Austin Osborn
- Report: Official report

Game information

First quarter

- SEMO – Khyair Spain 8-yard run (Justin Keller kick), 3:13. Redhawks 7–0. Drive: 7 plays, 29 yards, 3:25.

Second quarter

- INST – Keshon Singleton 4-yard pass from Elijah Owens (Sebastian Lopez kick), 13:57. Tied 7–7. Drive: 9 plays, 75 yards, 4:16.
- SEMO – Justin Keller 42-yard field goal, 0:03. Redhawks 10–7. Drive: 5 plays, 10 yards, 0:42.

Third quarter

- SEMO – John Anthony Jr. 18-yard pass from Braylen Ragland (Justin Keller kick), 12:16. Redhawks 17–7. Drive: 6 plays, 58 yards, 2:38.
- INST – Ashton Hayes 1-yard run (Sebastian Lopez kick), 1:51. Redhawks 17–14. Drive: 10 plays, 84 yards, 5:48.

Fourth quarter

- SEMO – Justin Keller 43-yard field goal, 12:30. Redhawks 20–14. Drive: 9 plays, 47 yards, 4:08.
- INST – Jayden Reed 25-yard pass from Elijah Owens (Sebastian Lopez kick), 10:26. Sycamores 21–20. Drive: 6 plays, 74 yards, 1:57.
- SEMO – Justin Keller 45-yard field goal, 7:04. Redhawks 23–21. Drive: 11 plays, 48 yards, 3:22.

Statistics	SEMO	INST
First downs	18	17
Plays–yards	66–327	63–346
Rushes–yards	30–53	31–58
Passing yards	274	288
Passing: comp–att–int	26–36–0	23–32–1
Turnovers	0	1
Time of possession	28:51	31:09

Team	Category	Player	Statistics
Southeast Missouri State	Passing	Braylen Ragland	26/36, 274 yards, TD
Southeast Missouri State	Rushing	Khyair Spain	17 carries, 66 yards, TD
Southeast Missouri State	Receiving	John Anthony Jr.	6 receptions, 88 yards, TD
Indiana State	Passing	Elijah Owens	23/32, 288 yards, 2 TD, INT
Indiana State	Rushing	Aaron Ball	10 carries, 33 yards
Indiana State	Receiving	BJ Wuest	4 receptions, 67 yards

=== at Purdue (FBS) ===
Indiana State Sycamores (0–1) at Purdue Boilermakers (FBS) (0–0) – Game summary

Quarter	1	2	3	4	Total
Sycamores	3	3	0	13	19
Boilermakers (FBS)	10	6	21	7	44

at Ross–Ade Stadium • West Lafayette, Indiana

- Date: September 4
- Game time: 7:00 p.m.
- Game weather: Sunny • Temperature: 93 °F (34 °C) • Wind: SW at 8 miles per hour (13 km/h)
- Game attendance: 49,019
- Referee: David Siegle
- TV announcers (BTN): Chris Vosters, Ryan Kerrigan and Kelsie Kasper
- Report: Official report

Game information

First quarter

- PUR – Jacobo Echeverria Lozano 39-yard field goal, 11:06. Boilermakers 3–0. Drive: 8 plays, 57 yards, 3:49.
- INST – Sebastian Lopez 28-yard field goal, 7:08. Tied 3–3. Drive: 9 plays, 65 yards, 3:58.
- PUR – Chauncey Magwood 6-yard pass from Ryan Browne (Jacobo Echeverria Lozano kick), 0:04. Boilermakers 10–3. Drive: 12 plays, 75 yards, 7:04.

Second quarter

- PUR – Jacobo Echeverria Lozano 25-yard field goal, 9:16. Boilermakers 13–3. Drive: 11 plays, 73 yards, 4:47.
- INST – Sebastian Lopez 47-yard field goal, 5:09. Boilermakers 13–6. Drive: 8 plays, 46 yards, 4:07.
- PUR – Jacobo Echeverria Lozano 23-yard field goal, 0:00. Boilermakers 16–6. Drive: 11 plays, 65 yards, 1:49.

Third quarter

- PUR – Fame Ijeboi 1-yard run (Jacobo Echeverria Lozano kick), 10:50. Boilermakers 23–6. Drive: 5 plays, 62 yards, 2:35.
- PUR – Tra'Mar Harris 7-yard pass from Ryan Browne (Jacobo Echeverria Lozano kick), 8:28. Boilermakers 30–6. Drive: 3 plays, 48 yards, 1:34.
- PUR – Asaad Waseem 18-yard pass from Ryan Browne (Jacobo Echeverria Lozano kick), 0:21. Boilermakers 37–6. Drive: 5 plays, 80 yards, 2:56.

Fourth quarter

- INST – Jayden Reed 45-yard pass from Brady Allen (Sebastian Lopez kick failed), 12:44. Boilermakers 44–12. Drive: 4 plays, 75 yards, 2:04.
- INST – Max McCool 1-yard run (Sebastian Lopez kick), 4:05. Boilermakers 44–19. Drive: 4 plays, 52 yards, 2:03.

Statistics	INST	PUR
First downs	12	28
Plays–yards	46–284	74–523
Rushes–yards	24–66	40–177
Passing yards	218	346
Passing: comp–att–int	12–22–1	27–34–0
Turnovers	1	0
Time of possession	22:38	37:22

Team	Category	Player	Statistics
Indiana State	Passing	Brady Allen	3/5, 117 yards, TD, INT
Indiana State	Rushing	Elijah Owens	11 carries, 60 yards
Indiana State	Receiving	Jayden Reed	5 receptions, 73 yards, TD
Purdue	Passing	Ryan Browne	23/29, 317 yards, 3 TD
Purdue	Rushing	Fame Ijeboi	11 carries, 87 yards, TD
Purdue	Receiving	Asaad Waseem	6 receptions, 107 yards, TD

=== at Eastern Illinois ===
Indiana State Sycamores (0–2) at Eastern Illinois Panthers (1–1) – Game summary

Quarter	1	2	3	4	Total
Sycamores	14	14	7	7	42
Panthers	7	0	14	14	35

at O'Brien Field • Charleston, Illinois

- Date: September 12
- Game time: 7:00 p.m. EDT
- Game weather: Sunny • Temperature: 87 °F (31 °C) • Wind: NW 1 mph (1.6 km/h)
- Game attendance: 6,971
- Referee: Drew Myers
- TV: ESPN+
- Report: Official report

Game information
First quarter
- INST – Aaron Ball 3-yard run (Sebastian Lopez kick), 12:06. Sycamores 7–0. Drive: 7 plays, 80 yards, 2:48.
- EIU – Charles Kellom 76-yard run (Drew Schiller kick), 11:18. Tied 7–7. Drive: 2 plays, 82 yards, 0:44.
- INST – Elijah Owens 1-yard run (Sebastian Lopez kick), 0:10. Sycamores 14–7. Drive: 6 plays, 59 yards, 2:51.

Second quarter

- INST – Dane Pardridge 35-yard pass from Elijah Owens (Sebastian Lopez kick), 7:50. Sycamores 21–7. Drive: 9 plays, 99 yards, 3:22.
- INST – Aaron Ball 1-yard pass from Elijah Owens (Sebastian Lopez kick), 0:07. Sycamores 28–7. Drive: 6 plays, 80 yards, 0:42.

Third quarter

- INST – BJ Wuest 42-yard pass from Elijah Owens (Sebastian Lopez kick), 11:11. Sycamores 35–7. Drive: 3 plays, 53 yards, 0:52.
- EIU – Jeremy Reeves 21-yard pass from Cole LaCrue (Drew Schiller kick), 4:23. Sycamores 35–14. Drive: 11 plays, 74 yards, 6:48.
- EIU – Cole LaCrue 8-yard run (Drew Schiller kick), 1:23. Sycamores 35–21. Drive: 3 plays, 64 yards, 1:19.

Fourth quarter

- INST – Elijah Owens 15-yard run (Sebastian Lopez kick), 10:40. Sycamores 42–21. Drive: 8 plays, 76 yards, 3:21.
- EIU – Jacarre Fleming-Page 7-yard pass from Cole LaCrue (Drew Schiller kick), 6:16. Sycamores 42–28. Drive: 12 plays, 75 yards, 4:24.
- EIU – Charles Kellom 8-yard pass from Cole LaCrue (Drew Schiller kick), 4:03. Sycamores 42–35. Drive: 2 plays, 13 yards, 0:46.

Statistics	INST	EIU
First downs	26	20
Plays–yards	71–492	66–466
Rushes–yards	37–208	32–184
Passing yards	284	282
Passing: comp–att–int	21–34–1	20–34–0
Turnovers	1	1
Time of possession	29:56	30:04

Team	Category	Player	Statistics
Indiana State	Passing	Elijah Owens	21/33, 284 yards, 3 TD, INT
Indiana State	Rushing	Elijah Owens	17 carries, 98 yards, 2 TD
Indiana State	Receiving	BJ Wuest	6 receptions, 142 yards, TD
Eastern Illinois	Passing	Cole LaCrue	20/34, 282 yards, 3 TD
Eastern Illinois	Rushing	Charles Kellom	14 carries, 106 yards, TD
Eastern Illinois	Receiving	Samuel Gonzalez	4 receptions, 78 yards

=== Valparaiso ===
Valparaiso Beacons (1–1) at Indiana State Sycamores (1–2) – Game summary

Quarter	1	2	3	4	Total
Beacons	3	0	7	6	16
Sycamores	5	17	14	3	39

at Memorial Stadium • Terre Haute, Indiana

- Date: September 19
- Game time: 1:00 p.m.
- Game weather: Sunny • Temperature: 90 °F (32 °C)
- Game attendance: 3,497
- Referee: Jason Berg
- TV announcers (ESPN+): Brian Jennings (play-by-play) and Austin Osborn (analyst)
- Report: Official report

Game information
First quarter
- INST – Sebastian Lopez 36-yard field goal, 11:23. Sycamores 3–0. Drive: 6 plays, 35 yards, 1:47.
- VAL – Luke Scoma 30-yard field goal, 5:31. Tied 3–3. Drive: 10 plays, 62 yards, 5:52.
- INST – 0-yard safety, 2:52. Sycamores 5–3.

Second quarter

- INST – Sebastian Lopez 28-yard field goal, 11:54. Sycamores 8–3. Drive: 6 plays, 71 yards, 2:14.
- INST – Jaylan Johnson 19-yard pass from Elijah Owens (Sebastian Lopez kick), 5:45. Sycamores 15–3. Drive: 10 plays, 50 yards, 3:52.
- INST – Aaron Ball 59-yard run (Sebastian Lopez kick), 3:56. Sycamores 22–3. Drive: 1 play, 59 yards, 0:13.

Third quarter

- INST – Aaron Ball 58-yard run (Sebastian Lopez kick), 10:35. Sycamores 29–3. Drive: 1 play, 58 yards, 0:11.
- VAL – Chris Gundy 11-yard pass from Rowan Keefe (Luke Scoma kick), 7:01. Sycamores 29–10. Drive: 9 plays, 68 yards, 3:27.
- INST – Keshon Singleton 16-yard pass from Brady Allen (Sebastian Lopez kick), 4:06. Sycamores 36–10. Drive: 6 plays, 75 yards, 2:55.

Fourth quarter

- INST – Sebastian Lopez 46-yard field goal, 13:22. Sycamores 39–10. Drive: 10 plays, 28 yards, 3:51.
- VAL – Daniel White 34-yard pass from Noah Ehrlich, 5:17. Sycamores 39–16. Drive: 5 plays, 52 yards, 1:15.

Statistics	VAL	INST
First downs	12	23
Plays–yards	62–211	75–568
Rushes–yards	24–−7	42–313
Passing yards	218	255
Passing: comp–att–int	24–38–1	19–33–1
Turnovers	1	1
Time of possession	30:06	29:54

Team	Category	Player	Statistics
Valparaiso	Passing	Rowan Keefe	21/30, 162 yards, TD
Valparaiso	Rushing	Ashton Allen	4 carries, 19 yards
Valparaiso	Receiving	Marty O'Keeffe	4 receptions, 56 yards
Indiana State	Passing	Elijah Owens	7/15, 115 yards, TD
Indiana State	Rushing	Aaron Ball	11 carries, 182 yards, 2 TD
Indiana State	Receiving	Manny Ellis	1 reception, 63 yards

=== No. 7 North Dakota ===
No. 7 North Dakota Fighting Hawks (3–1) at Indiana State Sycamores (2–2) – Game summary

Quarter	1	2	3	4	Total
No. 7 Fighting Hawks	7	21	0	14	42
Sycamores	7	7	7	14	35

at Memorial Stadium • Terre Haute, Indiana

- Date: September 26
- Game time: 1:00 p.m.
- Game weather: Sunny • Temperature: 73 °F (23 °C)
- Game attendance: 2,765
- Referee: Jason Perkins
- TV announcers (ESPN+): Brian Jennings (play-by-play) and Austin Osborn (analyst)
- Report: Official report

Game information
First quarter
- UND – Korey Tai 14-yard pass from Jerry Kaminski (Kenten Laughman kick), 8:50. Fighting Hawks 7–0. Drive: 14 plays, 80 yards, 5:54.
- INST – Jayden Reed 20-yard pass from Brady Allen (Sebastian Lopez kick), 5:41. Tied 7–7. Drive: 9 plays, 75 yards, 3:18.

Second quarter

- UND – Jerry Kaminski 9-yard run (Kenten Laughman kick), 14:14. Fighting Hawks 14–7. Drive: 7 plays, 62 yards, 2:42.
- UND – Mason South 6-yard pass from Jerry Kaminski (Kenten Laughman kick), 9:30. Fighting Hawks 21–7. Drive: 8 plays, 59 yards, 2:49.
- INST – Jaylan Johnson 17-yard pass from Brady Allen (Sebastian Lopez kick), 6:57. Fighting Hawks 21–14. Drive: 7 plays, 73 yards, 2:27.
- UND – Cameron Weir 13-yard pass from Jerry Kaminski (Kenten Laughman kick), 0:41. Fighting Hawks 28–14. Drive: 11 plays, 55 yards, 3:26.

Third quarter

- INST – Aaron Ball 10-yard run (Sebastian Lopez kick), 3:22. Fighting Hawks 28–21. Drive: 3 plays, 57 yards, 1:05.

Fourth quarter

- UND – Jerry Kaminski 1-yard run (Kenten Laughman kick), 13:02. Fighting Hawks 35–21. Drive: 11 plays, 81 yards, 4:00.
- UND – Cameron Weir 39-yard pass from Jerry Kaminski (Kenten Laughman kick), 9:37. Fighting Hawks 42–21. Drive: 6 plays, 82 yards, 2:02.
- INST – Jayden Reed 33-yard pass from Brady Allen (Sebastian Lopez kick), 8:01. Fighting Hawks 42–28. Drive: 4 plays, 55 yards, 1:36.
- INST – BJ Wuest 17-yard pass from Brady Allen (Sebastian Lopez kick), 6:36. Fighting Hawks 42–35. Drive: 5 plays, 47 yards, 1:24.

Statistics	UND	INST
First downs	29	19
Plays–yards	90–530	61–314
Rushes–yards	42–149	28–44
Passing yards	381	270
Passing: comp–att–int	33–48–0	18–33–0
Turnovers	1	1
Time of possession	36:52	23:08

Team	Category	Player	Statistics
North Dakota	Passing	Jerry Kaminski	33/48, 381 yards, 4 TD
North Dakota	Rushing	Jerry Kaminski	18 carries, 86 yards, 2 TD
North Dakota	Receiving	Deng Deng	6 receptions, 101 yards
Indiana State	Passing	Brady Allen	18/33, 270 yards, 4 TD
Indiana State	Rushing	Aaron Ball	16 carries, 50 yards, TD
Indiana State	Receiving	Jayden Reed	8 receptions, 129 yards, 2 TD

=== at No. 13 South Dakota ===
Indiana State Sycamores (2–3) at No. 13 South Dakota Coyotes (3–2) – Game summary

Quarter	1	2	3	4	Total
Sycamores	0	0	7	7	14
No. 13 Coyotes	14	16	7	7	44

at DakotaDome • Vermillion, South Dakota

- Date: October 3
- Game time: 2:00 p.m.
- Game weather: Indoor
- Game attendance: 9,002
- Referee: Jason Berg
- TV announcers (ESPN+): Jay Elsen (play-by-play) and Andre Fields (analyst)
- Report: Official report

Game information
First quarter
- SDAK – Jesse Miller 4-yard pass from Austyn Modrzewski (Bohdie Ing kick), 9:38. Coyotes 7–0. Drive: 9 plays, 68 yards, 3:51.
- SDAK – Charles Pierre Jr. 10-yard run (Bohdie Ing kick), 1:01. Coyotes 14–0. Drive: 3 plays, 30 yards, 1:31.

Second quarter

- SDAK – Brayden White 37-yard pass from Austyn Modrzewski, 12:41. Coyotes 20–0. Drive: 3 plays, 49 yards, 1:26.
- SDAK – Charles Pierre Jr. 17-yard pass from Austyn Modrzewski (Bohdie Ing kick), 4:21. Coyotes 27–0. Drive: 4 plays, 34 yards, 2:12.
- SDAK – Ford Hamilton 49-yard field goal, 0:00. Coyotes 30–0. Drive: 2 plays, 64 yards, 0:41.

Third quarter

- INST – Torey French 63-yard pass from Brady Allen (Sebastian Lopez kick), 7:41. Coyotes 30–7. Drive: 2 plays, 64 yards, 0:41.
- SDAK – Charles Pierre Jr. 24-yard run (Bohdie Ing kick), 2:42. Coyotes 37–7. Drive: 4 plays, 35 yards, 2:29.

Fourth quarter

- SDAK – Tysen Boze 25-yard pass from Jackson Proctor (Bohdie Ing kick), 10:07. Coyotes 44–7. Drive: 9 plays, 80 yards, 5:28.
- INST – Max McCool 1-yard run (Sebastian Lopez kick), 7:00. Coyotes 44–14. Drive: 8 plays, 75 yards, 3:07.

Statistics	INST	SDAK
First downs	13	23
Plays–yards	58–346	70–437
Rushes–yards	30–113	44–204
Passing yards	233	233
Passing: comp–att–int	15–28–3	18–26–0
Turnovers	5	0
Time of possession	25:13	34:47

Team	Category	Player	Statistics
Indiana State	Passing	Brady Allen	15/27, 233 yards, TD
Indiana State	Rushing	Max McCool	10 carries, 41 yards, TD
Indiana State	Receiving	Torey French	1 reception, 63 yards, TD
South Dakota	Passing	Austyn Modrzewski	16/23, 196 yards, 3 TD
South Dakota	Rushing	Charles Pierre Jr.	15 carries, 109 yards, 2 TD
South Dakota	Receiving	Brayden White	5 receptions, 90 yards, TD

=== No. 8 Youngstown State ===
No. 8 Youngstown State Penguins (4–2) at Indiana State Sycamores (2–4) – Game summary

Quarter	1	2	3	4	Total
No. 8 Penguins	10	7	7	0	24
Sycamores	15	21	14	7	57

at Memorial Stadium • Terre Haute, Indiana

- Date: October 10
- Game time: 1:00 p.m.
- Game weather: Sunny
- Game attendance: 4,428
- Referee: Grant Henderson
- TV announcers (ESPN+): Brian Jennings (play-by-play) and Austin Osborn (analyst)
- Report: Official report

Game information
First quarter
- INST – Max McCool 1-yard run (Sebastian Lopez kick), 13:36. Sycamores 7–0. Drive: 4 plays, 75 yards, 1:24.
- YSU – Jaden Gilbert 4-yard run (Andrew Lastovka kick), 9:36. Tied 7–7. Drive: 9 plays, 75 yards, 4:00.
- YSU – Jaden Gilbert 65-yard run (Beau Brungard run), 6:43. Penguins 15–7. Drive: 2 plays, 71 yards, 0:42.
- INST – Sebastian Lopez 47-yard field goal, 3:19. Penguins 15–10. Drive: 10 plays, 56 yards, 3:24.

Second quarter

- YSU – Beau Brungard 1-yard run (Andrew Lastovka kick), 13:53. Penguins 22–10. Drive: 9 plays, 75 yards, 4:26.
- INST – Torey French 25-yard pass from Brady Allen (Sebastian Lopez kick), 12:36. Penguins 22–17. Drive: 4 plays, 75 yards, 1:17.
- YSU – Jaden Gilbert 12-yard run (Andrew Lastovka kick), 8:07. Penguins 29–17. Drive: 10 plays, 75 yards, 4:29.
- YSU – Lynn Wyche-El 36-yard pass from Beau Brungard (Andrew Lastovka kick), 3:14. Penguins 36–17. Drive: 6 plays, 80 yards, 1:55.

Third quarter

- YSU – Bryan Hunt 75-yard pass from Beau Brungard (Andrew Lastovka kick), 14:50. Penguins 43–17. Drive: 1 play, 75 yards, 0:10.
- INST – Max McCool 37-yard run (Sebastian Lopez kick), 11:54. Penguins 43–24. Drive: 7 plays, 75 yards, 2:56.
- YSU – Jeremiah Sanders 16-yard pass from Beau Brungard (Andrew Lastovka kick), 9:19. Penguins 50–24. Drive: 6 plays, 64 yards, 2:35.

Fourth quarter

- YSU – Beau Brungard 1-yard run (Andrew Lastovka kick), 12:07. Penguins 57–24. Drive: 7 plays, 82 yards, 2:53.

Statistics	YSU	INST
First downs	29	13
Plays–yards	75–696	57–328
Rushes–yards	39–279	28–29
Passing yards	417	299
Passing: comp–att–int	20–29–0	26–36–0
Turnovers	0	0
Time of possession	33:49	26:11

Team	Category	Player	Statistics
Youngstown State	Passing	Beau Brungard	25/34, 386 yards, 3 TD
Youngstown State	Rushing	Jaden Gilbert	15 carries, 163 yards, 3 TD
Youngstown State	Receiving	Lynn Wyche-El	10 receptions, 118 yards, TD
Indiana State	Passing	Brady Allen	20/28, 299 yards, TD
Indiana State	Rushing	Max McCool	11 carries, 38 yards, 2 TD
Indiana State	Receiving	Jayden Reed	7 receptions, 122 yards

=== at No. 10 Illinois State ===
Indiana State Sycamores (2–5) at No. 10 Illinois State Redbirds (5–2) – Game summary

Quarter	1	2	3	4	Total
Sycamores	7	0	0	3	10
No. 10 Redbirds	3	14	0	0	17

at Hancock Stadium • Normal, Illinois

- Date: October 24
- Game time: 2:00 p.m. CDT
- Game weather: Sunny • Temperature: 73 °F (23 °C) • Wind: SE at 7 miles per hour (11 km/h)
- Game attendance: 11,280
- Referee: Jason Berg
- TV: ESPN+
- Report: Official report

Game information
First quarter
- INST – Jayden Reed 8-yard pass from Brady Allen (Sebastian Lopez kick), 9:11. Sycamores 7–0. Drive: 10 plays, 77 yards, 3:34.
- ILST – Michael Cosentino 22-yard field goal, 3:30. Sycamores 7–3. Drive: 13 plays, 70 yards, 5:41.

Second quarter

- ILST – Victor Dawson 3-yard run (Michael Cosentino kick), 10:04. Redbirds 10–7. Drive: 15 plays, 83 yards, 6:48.
- ILST – Key Crowell 48-yard interception (Michael Cosentino kick), 8:13. Redbirds 17–7.

Third quarter

- No scoring plays.

Fourth quarter

- INST – Sebastian Lopez 23-yard field goal, 7:47. Redbirds 17–10. Drive: 12 plays, 55 yards, 4:57.

Statistics	INST	ILST
First downs	21	20
Plays–yards	73–359	73–285
Rushes–yards	28–80	41–111
Passing yards	279	174
Passing: comp–att–int	25–45–1	16–32–2
Turnovers	3	3
Time of possession	27:15	32:45

Team	Category	Player	Statistics
Indiana State	Passing	Brady Allen	25/45, 279 yards, TD, INT
Indiana State	Rushing	Max McCool	19 carries, 84 yards
Indiana State	Receiving	Jayden Reed	9 receptions, 98 yards, TD
Illinois State	Passing	Beckham Pellant	16/32, 174 yards, 2 INT
Illinois State	Rushing	Victor Dawson	21 carries, 57 yards, TD
Illinois State	Receiving	Ethan Loss	5 receptions, 58 yards

=== at Northern Iowa ===
Indiana State Sycamores (2–6) at Northern Iowa Panthers (3–4) – Game summary

Quarter	1	2	3	4	Total
Sycamores	3	6	7	7	23
Panthers	3	14	7	21	45

at UNI-Dome • Cedar Falls, Iowa

- Date: October 31
- Game time: 1:00 p.m.
- Game weather: Indoor
- Game attendance: 7,320
- Referee: Jason Perkins
- TV announcers (ESPN+): Brad Wells (play-by-play) and Justin Surrency (analyst)
- Report: Official report

Game information
First quarter
- INST – Sebastian Lopez 22-yard field goal, 5:12. Sycamores 3–0. Drive: 14 plays, 76 yards, 5:56.
- UNI – Blake Pankratz 24-yard field goal, 0:23. Tied 3–3. Drive: 11 plays, 68 yards, 4:49.

Second quarter

- UNI – Christian Collins 15-yard run (Blake Pankratz kick), 8:43. Panthers 10–3. Drive: 2 plays, 40 yards, 0:29.
- INST – Keshon Singleton 18-yard pass from Elijah Owens, 4:45. Panthers 10–9. Drive: 9 plays, 50 yards, 3:58.
- UNI – Taj Hughes 12-yard pass from Jaxon Dailey (Blake Pankratz kick), 1:09. Panthers 17–9. Drive: 8 plays, 75 yards, 3:36.

Third quarter

- UNI – Xavier Terrell 9-yard run (Blake Pankratz kick), 3:47. Panthers 24–9. Drive: 5 plays, 77 yards, 2:24.
- INST – Max McCool 14-yard pass from Elijah Owens (Sebastian Lopez kick), 1:34. Panthers 24–16. Drive: 8 plays, 84 yards, 2:06.

Fourth quarter

- UNI – Christian Collins 30-yard run (Blake Pankratz kick), 13:13. Panthers 31–16. Drive: 8 plays, 75 yards, 3:21.
- INST – Elijah Owens 2-yard run (Sebastian Lopez kick), 8:49. Panthers 31–23. Drive: 13 plays, 75 yards, 4:24.
- UNI – Xavier Terrell 38-yard run (Blake Pankratz kick), 4:06. Panthers 38–23. Drive: 7 plays, 75 yards, 4:43.
- UNI – Calvin Jaworski 60-yard interception (Blake Pankratz kick), 2:34. Panthers 45–23.

Statistics	INST	UNI
First downs	31	24
Plays–yards	82–473	61–438
Rushes–yards	35–160	39–240
Passing yards	313	198
Passing: comp–att–int	27–47–1	12–22–1
Turnovers	3	1
Time of possession	29:54	30:06

Team	Category	Player	Statistics
Indiana State	Passing	Elijah Owens	27/47, 313 yards, 2 TD, INT
Indiana State	Rushing	Elijah Owens	24 carries, 122 yards, TD
Indiana State	Receiving	Jayden Reed	10 receptions, 137 yards
Northern Iowa	Passing	Jaxon Dailey	12/22, 198 yards, TD, INT
Northern Iowa	Rushing	Christian Collins	11 carries, 107 yards, 2 TD
Northern Iowa	Receiving	Brady McCullough	2 receptions, 83 yards

=== Southern Illinois ===
Southern Illinois Salukis (4–5) at Indiana State Sycamores (2–7) – Game summary

Quarter	1	2	3	4	Total
Salukis	7	10	14	6	37
Sycamores	3	3	0	14	20

at Memorial Stadium • Terre Haute, Indiana

- Date: November 7
- Game time: 6:00 p.m.
- Game weather: Sunny
- Game attendance: 3,247
- Referee: John Shay
- TV announcers (ESPN+): Brian Jennings (play-by-play) and Austin Osborne (analyst)
- Report: Official report

Game information
First quarter
- INST – Sebastian Lopez 34-yard field goal, 10:43. Sycamores 3–0. Drive: 9 plays, 59 yards, 4:17.
- SIU – Kyle Thomas 57-yard pass from DJ Williams (Weston Schofield kick), 5:58. Salukis 7–3. Drive: 5 plays, 94 yards, 1:38.

Second quarter

- SIU – Seth Adams 50-yard field goal, 12:01. Salukis 10–3. Drive: 4 plays, 3 yards, 1:37.
- SIU – Kyle Thomas 18-yard pass from DJ Williams (Weston Schofield kick), 7:55. Salukis 17–3. Drive: 2 plays, 19 yards, 0:28.
- INST – Sebastian Lopez 41-yard field goal, 1:08. Salukis 17–6. Drive: 8 plays, 44 yards, 3:17.

Third quarter

- SIU – Markell Quick 25-yard pass from DJ Williams (Weston Schofield kick), 5:24. Salukis 24–6. Drive: 12 plays, 63 yards, 4:18.
- SIU – Kyle Thomas 7-yard pass from DJ Williams (Weston Schofield kick), 2:29. Salukis 31–6. Drive: 7 plays, 50 yards, 2:50.

Fourth quarter

- SIU – Weston Schofield 22-yard field goal, 13:33. Salukis 34–6. Drive: 9 plays, 44 yards, 3:51.
- INST – Zechariah Prince 99-yard run (Sebastian Lopez kick), 9:24. Salukis 34–13. Drive: 1 play, 99 yards, 0:15.
- INST – Torey French 29-yard pass from Brock Riddle (Sebastian Lopez kick), 5:15. Salukis 34–20. Drive: 4 plays, 73 yards, 1:56.
- SIU – Weston Schofield 23-yard field goal, 1:55. Salukis 37–20. Drive: 4 plays, 9 yards, 2:09.

Statistics	SIU	INST
First downs	18	10
Plays–yards	78–392	49–282
Rushes–yards	48–176	25–137
Passing yards	216	145
Passing: comp–att–int	17–30–0	16–24–2
Turnovers	0	3
Time of possession	36:00	24:00

Team	Category	Player	Statistics
Southern Illinois	Passing	DJ Williams	16/29, 211 yards, 4 TD
Southern Illinois	Rushing	Quade Chatmon	13 carries, 82 yards
Southern Illinois	Receiving	Kyle Thomas	7 receptions, 114 yards, 3 TD
Indiana State	Passing	Brock Riddle	3/4, 65 yards, TD
Indiana State	Rushing	Zechariah Prince	6 carries, 119 yards, TD
Indiana State	Receiving	Jayden Reed	4 receptions, 66 yards

=== Murray State ===
Murray State Racers (1–9) at Indiana State Sycamores (2–8) – Game summary

Quarter	1	2	3	4	Total
Racers	7	14	13	10	44
Sycamores	7	7	0	0	14

at Memorial Stadium • Terre Haute, Indiana

- Date: November 14
- Game time: 1:00 p.m. EST
- Game weather: Sunny
- Game attendance: 2,666
- Referee: Tyler Downs
- TV announcers (ESPN+): Brian Jennings (play-by-play) and Austin Osborne (analyst)
- Report: Official report

Game information
First quarter
- MUR – Jaxon Potter 96-yard pass from Collin Shannon (Tyler Dorn kick), 7:31. Racers 7–0. Drive: 1 play, 96 yards, 0:14.
- INST – Zechariah Prince 73-yard run (Sebastian Lopez kick), 1:20. Tied 7–7. Drive: 1 play, 73 yards, 0:11.

Second quarter

- MUR – Jaxon Potter 15-yard pass from Collin Shannon (Tyler Dorn kick), 10:45. Racers 14–7. Drive: 11 plays, 75 yards, 5:35.
- MUR – Dimitri Howard 10-yard run (Tyler Dorn kick), 1:08. Racers 21–7. Drive: 6 plays, 47 yards, 2:31.
- INST – BJ Wuest 100-yard blocked field goal return (Sebastian Lopez kick), 0:00. Racers 21–14.

Third quarter

- MUR – Jawaun Northington 2-yard run (Tyler Dorn kick), 6:50. Racers 28–14. Drive: 1 play, 2 yards, 0:04.
- MUR – Trey Firestone 5-yard pass from Collin Shannon, 3:24. Racers 34–14. Drive: 6 plays, 39 yards, 2:19.

Fourth quarter

- MUR – Rocco Devita 25-yard field goal, 14:27. Racers 37–14. Drive: 8 plays, 33 yards, 2:44.
- MUR – Baxter Wright 21-yard run (Rocco Devita kick), 3:39. Racers 44–14. Drive: 14 plays, 99 yards, 6:48.

Statistics	MUR	INST
First downs	31	7
Plays–yards	78–577	48–140
Rushes–yards	41–215	30–68
Passing yards	362	72
Passing: comp–att–int	27–37–0	9–18–1
Turnovers	0	1
Time of possession	37:34	22:26

Team	Category	Player	Statistics
Murray State	Passing	Collin Shannon	25/33, 355 yards, 3 TD
Murray State	Rushing	Jawaun Northington	20 carries, 103 yards, TD
Murray State	Receiving	Jaxon Potter	11 receptions, 228 yards, 2 TD
Indiana State	Passing	Brock Riddle	5/10, 38 yards, INT
Indiana State	Rushing	Zechariah Prince	17 carries, 109 yards, TD
Indiana State	Receiving	Tyler Stewart	2 receptions, 31 yards

=== at No. 3 South Dakota State ===
Indiana State Sycamores (2–9) at No. 3 South Dakota State Jackrabbits (9–2) – Game summary

Quarter	1	2	3	4	Total
Sycamores	0	0	0	0	0
No. 3 Jackrabbits	0	0	0	0	0

at Dana J. Dykhouse Stadium • Brookings, South Dakota

- Date: November 21
- Game time: 3:00 p.m.
- TV: ESPN+

Statistics	INST	SDST
First downs		
Plays–yards		
Rushes–yards		
Passing yards		
Passing: comp–att–int		
Turnovers		
Time of possession		

Team	Category	Player	Statistics
Indiana State	Passing		
Indiana State	Rushing		
Indiana State	Receiving		
South Dakota State	Passing		
South Dakota State	Rushing		
South Dakota State	Receiving		

== Personnel ==
=== Roster ===
2026 Indiana State Sycamores football team roster
Players
Coaches
Offense

Pos.	#	Name	Class
WR	0	EJ Hartwell	So
WR	1	Zack Drawdy Jr.	RJr
QB	2	Elijah Owens	RJr
RB	3	Deion Brown	RJr
QB	4	Baruk Jonsson	RFr
RB	5	Zechariah Prince	RJr
QB	6	Brady Wilson	RFr
WR	7	Britten Traylor	Jr
TE	8	Jacob Soley	RFr
WR	9	Tyler Stewart	Jr
QB	10	Brock Riddle	RSo
TE	11	Tyler Nansel	RSr
WR	12	Torey French	RSo
RB	13	Ashton Hayes	RSr
WR	14	BJ Wuest	RJr
WR	15	Karwin Pope	Fr
QB	16	John Bargen	Fr
WR	17	Keshon Singleton	RSo
QB	18	Brady Allen	RJr
WR	19	Willy Suarez	RSo
RB	20	Max McCool	So
RB	24	Manny Ellis	Fr
RB	25	Aaron Ball	RSo
RB	33	Carson Dunn	RJr
OL	50	Prinz Guitian	RSr
OL	51	Gabe Winans	RJr
OL	54	Zeshaun Hudson	RJr
OL	56	Hank Fuchs	RSo
OL	58	Andy Hertlein	RFr
OL	60	Griffin Hile	RSo
OL	62	Owen Trietsch	RFr
OL	64	Jacek Blaszynski	RJr
OL	66	Zack Hess	RSo
OL	67	Jordan Solofa-Fatu	RJr
OL	68	Zach Simpson	RJr
OL	69	Justice Musser	RSr
OL	70	Bradyn Mazanowski	RFr
OL	71	Jireh Ioane	RSo
OL	72	Julian Young	RJr
OL	74	Ismail Ganley	RFr
OL	75	Drew Page	RSr
OL	76	Devion Johnson	Fr
OL	77	Fernando Garcia	Jr
OL	78	Zac Wurm	RSo
TE	80	Ethan Mitchell	RFr
WR	81	Thomas Amankwaa	RSr
WR	82	Dane Pardridge	RJr
WR	83	Jayden Reed	Fr
TE	84	Jaylan Johnson	RFr
WR	85	Jake Dyer	RFr
WR	86	Lawson Looker	Fr
TE	87	Paul Oliver	Fr
WR	88	Tre Brown	RSo
TE	88	Jack Young Jr.	RSr

Defense

Pos.	#	Name	Class
LB	0	Lovell Vereen II	Jr
DB	1	Devin Johnson	RSr
DB	2	Jerome Robinson	RSr
DL	3	Jayden Childers	RSr
DB	4	Nic Yatsko	RSo
DL	6	Kolten Gajewski	RSr
DB	7	CJ Davis	RJr
DB	9	Anthony Walk Jr.	Sr
DB	10	Arison Walker	So
DB	11	Jorge Valdes	RJr
DB	12	Nate Lindsey-Gill	Sr
DB	13	Will Gavin	RSr
LB	14	Jackson McDonald	Fr
LB	15	DJ Griffith	RSr
LB	16	Micah McNair	So
DB	17	Xavier McIntyre	Jr
DL	18	Peter Eyabi	RSr
DB	19	Zakiese Smith	RFr
DB	21	Desmond Palmer	Fr
DB	22	Zach Coleman	RFr
DB	23	Xavien Andrews	RSr
DL	25	Robert Beasley	So
DB	27	LaBrian Carrington	RJr
DB	28	Jaden Wayt	RJr
DL	29	Jamere Pendleton	RFr
LB	30	Kaden Gajewski	RJr
DB	32	Gavin Hagan	RFr
DB	33	Marlo Talan Foster	Fr
LB	34	Orlando Gonzalez	RFr
DL	35	Kaleb Harris	RSo
LB	36	Alex Rose	RJr
DB	37	Hayden Lechlitner	Fr
LB	38	Brandon Lynch	RSo
DB	39	Ashton Drakeford	Fr
LB	41	Luke Karras	Fr
LB	42	Braxton Sampson	RSr
LB	43	Braydon Durham	RSo
DL	44	Tysen Smith	RSo
DL	45	Christian Gavin	Fr
DB	46	Gavin Smith	Fr
DL	52	Mason Keifer	So
DL	55	Charlie Leota	RSr
DL	57	Alan White	RSo
DL	59	Thad Lawrence	Fr
DL	59	Thad Lawrence	Fr
DL	90	Nathaniel Onoja	Fr
DL	91	Damion Jones Jr.	Fr
DL	92	Khalil Jefferson	Fr
DL	93	Mason Knipp	RSo
DL	94	Sebastian Tate	Fr
DL	95	Emilio Diaz	RSr
DL	96	Jace Deakins	RFr
DL	97	Dilyn Fuller	RJr
DL	98	Bryce Patterson	RJr
DL	99	Elijah Halfpap	RSo

Special teams

Pos.	#	Name	Class
P	27	Niko Martinovic	RFr
K	28	Carter Payne	Fr
LS	31	Carson Weed	So
K	37	Sebastian Lopez	RJr
LS	40	Oscar Grant	Fr
K	95	Rylan Vinard	RFr
K, P	99	Spencer Conrad	RSo

Head coach

- Curt Mallory

Coordinators/assistant coaches

- Darrell Funk – Assistant head coach / run game coordinator / offensive line
- John Bear – Offensive coordinator / quarterbacks
- Steve Morrison – Defensive coordinator / linebackers
- Brad Jarman – Special teams coordinator / nickels
- Logan Hale – Tight Ends / Recruiting Coordinator
- JJ Henderson – Cornerbacks
- Austin Flyger – Defensive line
- Ryan Cook – Running backs
- Manny Harris – Wide receivers
- Edward Warinner – Safeties
- Kyland Dickerson – Defensive assistant
- Adam Frey – Offensive assistant

Legend

- (C) Team captain
- (S) Suspended
- (I) Ineligible
- Injured
- Redshirt

Roster
Last update: 2026-10-20
