= 2026 Wake Forest Demon Deacons football team =

American college football season

2026 Wake Forest Demon Deacons football

ACC Championship Game, vs. Miami (FL)
- Conference: Atlantic Coast Conference

Ranking
- Coaches: No. 10
- AP: No. 10
- CFP: No. 11
- Record: 10–1 (7–1 ACC)
- Head coach: Jake Dickert (2nd season)
- Offensive coordinator: Rob Ezell (2nd season)
- Offensive scheme: Spread
- Defensive coordinator: Scottie Hazelton (2nd season)
- Base defense: 4–2–5
- Home stadium: Allegacy Federal Credit Union Stadium

2026 Atlantic Coast Conference football standings
	Conf.			Overall
Team	W		L	W		L
No. 7 Miami (FL) y	8	–	0	10	–	1
No. 11 Wake Forest y	7	–	1	10	–	1
No. 23 Louisville	7	–	2	8	–	3
Clemson	5	–	3	7	–	4
SMU	5	–	3	7	–	4
Duke	4	–	4	7	–	4
Stanford	4	–	4	6	–	5
Virginia	4	–	4	6	–	5
Boston College	3	–	4	5	–	6
Pittsburgh	3	–	5	6	–	5
Virginia Tech	3	–	5	6	–	5
NC State	3	–	5	5	–	6
Florida State	3	–	5	5	–	6
Syracuse	3	–	6	5	–	6
North Carolina	2	–	5	5	–	6
California	2	–	6	3	–	8
Georgia Tech	2	–	6	3	–	8
Championship: Miami (FL) vs. Wake Forest
^ – College Football Playoff participant; $ – Conference champion; y – Championship game participant; As of November 22, 2026; Rankings from CFP rankings

The 2026 Wake Forest Demon Deacons football team represents Wake Forest University as a member of the Atlantic Coast Conference (ACC) during the 2026 NCAA Division I FBS football season. The Demon Deacons are led by Jake Dickert in his second season as their head coach. They play their home games at Allegacy Federal Credit Union Stadium located in Winston-Salem, North Carolina.

== Offseason ==
=== Transfers ===
==== Outgoing ====
Player	Position	Destination
Drew Pickett	RB	Alabama A&M
Kendal Howard	EDGE	Austin Peay
William Wiebush	S	Austin Peay
Ka'Shawn Thomas	DL	Ball State
Elijah Oehlke	QB	Bryant
Reginald Vick	WR	Colorado State
Jeremiah Melvin	WR	East Carolina
Micah Mays Jr.	WR	Florida
Jaylon Edmond	CB	Hawaii
Juju Tackie	DB	Holy Cross
Deshawn Purdie	QB	Liberty
Cole Funderburk	EDGE	Marshall
Darius Jones	LB	Morgan State
Ian VerSteeg	WR	Ohio
Chris Barnes	WR	Oklahoma State
Dominic DeLuca	TE	Rhode Island
Ben Grice	WR	Rice
Sterling Berkhalter	WR	Texas
Melvin Siani	OT	Texas
Bryce Butler	DL	Texas Tech
Mateen Ibiroga	DL	Texas Tech
EJ Reid	WR	UAB
Harry Lodge	TE	UCLA
Nathan Pahanich	OT	UConn
Jacob Cosby-Mosley	S	Western Kentucky
Tate Carney	RB	Unknown
Derrell Johnson II	IOL	Withdrawn

==== Incoming ====
Player	Position	Previous school
Kam Shanks	WR	Arkansas
John Ohnegian	IOL	Bucknell
Buom Jock	LB	California
Landon Morris	TE	California
Vincent Firenze	S	Dayton
Chase Tyler	WR	Duke
Brian Blades II	CB	FIU
KD Daniels	RB	Florida
Bernard Causey	CB	Georgia State
Joshua Patterson	S	Iowa State
Antonio Meeks	WR	Louisville
Ethan Calloway	OT	LSU
Sydir Mitchell	DL	LSU
Ny Carr	WR	Miami (FL)
D. J. Johnson	EDGE	New Hampshire
Tolu Olajide	OT	New Hampshire
Gio Lopez	QB	North Carolina
Sawyer Seidl	RB	North Dakota
Ryan Berger	OT	Oregon State
Drayden Dickman	WR	Rice
Eli Potts	WR	Tulsa
Tylan McNichols	LB	UAB
Wondame Davis	WR	UTEP
Matt Heron	DL	Weber State
Will Way	IOL	Weber State

== Schedule ==
Date	Time	Opponent	Rank	Site	TV	Result	Attendance
September 3	7:00 p.m.	Akron*		Allegacy Federal Credit Union Stadium; Winston-Salem, NC	ACCN	W 38–16	30,735
September 12	12:00 p.m.	at Purdue*		Ross–Ade Stadium; West Lafayette, IN	FS1	W 38–36 ^{2OT}	50,363
September 18	7:30 p.m.	No. 5 Miami (FL)		Allegacy Federal Credit Union Stadium; Winston-Salem, NC	ESPN	L 20–33	32,147
September 26	12:00 p.m.	at No. 16 Louisville		L&N Federal Credit Union Stadium; Louisville, KY	ESPN	W 30–27	46,042
October 3	12:00 p.m.	Stanford		Allegacy Federal Credit Union Stadium; Winston-Salem, NC	ACCN	W 57–3	29,188
October 10	12:00 p.m.	at NC State		Carter–Finley Stadium; Raleigh, NC (rivalry)	The CW	W 38–14	56,919
October 17	10:30 p.m.	at California	No. 21	California Memorial Stadium; Berkeley, CA	ESPN2	W 41–7	34,850
October 31	3:45 p.m.	Virginia	No. 14	Allegacy Federal Credit Union Stadium; Winston-Salem, NC	ESPN2	W 51–7	30,218
November 7	3:30 p.m.	Merrimack*^{†}	No. 16	Allegacy Federal Credit Union Stadium; Winston-Salem, NC	ACCN	W 77–0	28,098
November 14	12:00 p.m.	at SMU	No. 13	Gerald J. Ford Stadium; University Park, TX	ESPN	W 49–7	33,571
November 21	12:00 p.m.	at Georgia Tech	No. 11	Bobby Dodd Stadium; Atlanta, GA	ESPN	W 50–29	45,296
November 28	3:30 p.m.	Duke		Allegacy Federal Credit Union Stadium; Winston-Salem, NC (rivalry, College GameDay)	ESPN		
December 5	12:00 p.m.	vs. Miami (FL)		Bank of America Stadium; Charlotte, NC (ACC Championship Game)	ABC		
*Non-conference game; ^{†}Homecoming; Rankings from AP Poll (and CFP Rankings, after November 3) – Released prior to game; All times are in Eastern time

== Rankings ==
Ranking movements Legend: ██ Increase in ranking ██ Decrease in ranking — = Not ranked RV = Received votes
	Week															
Poll	Pre	1	2	3	4	5	6	7	8	9	10	11	12	13	14	Final
AP	—	—	—	—	RV	RV	21	17	14	14	11	10				
Coaches	—	—	RV	—	RV	RV	23	19	15	14	11	10				
CFP	Not released									16	13	11				Not released

== Game summaries ==
=== vs. Akron ===
Akron Zips (0–0) at Wake Forest Demon Deacons (0–0) – Game summary

Quarter	1	2	3	4	Total
Zips	0	3	0	13	16
Demon Deacons	10	18	3	7	38

at Allegacy Federal Credit Union Stadium • Winston-Salem, North Carolina

- Date: September 3
- Game time: 7:00 p.m. EDT
- Game weather: Sunny
- Game attendance: 30,735
- Referee: Jerry Magallanes
- TV announcers (ACCN): Matt Schick, Forrest Conoly and Ashley Stroehlein

Game information

First quarter

- WAKE – Kam Shanks 27-yard pass from Gio Lopez (Connor Calvert kick), 11:32. Demon Deacons 7–0. Drive: 8 plays, 82 yards, 3:23.
- WAKE – Connor Calvert 25-yard field goal, 2:44. Demon Deacons 10–0. Drive: 14 plays, 57 yards, 6:13.

Second quarter

- WAKE – Antonio Meeks 72-yard pass from Gio Lopez (Connor Calvert kick), 11:39. Demon Deacons 17–0. Drive: 4 plays, 88 yards, 1:38.
- WAKE – Connor Calvert 29-yard field goal, 6:53. Demon Deacons 20–0. Drive: 8 plays, 32 yards, 3:47.
- WAKE – Carlos Hernandez 78-yard pass from Gio Lopez (Steele Pizzella–Will Loerzel pass), 4:57. Demon Deacons 28–0. Drive: 1 play, 78 yards, 0:13.
- AKR – Matthew Schramm 28-yard field goal, 1:35. Demon Deacons 28–3. Drive: 10 plays, 65 yards, 3:22.

Third quarter

- WAKE – Connor Calvert 26-yard field goal, 10:16. Demon Deacons 31–3. Drive: 6 plays, 61 yards, 2:17.

Fourth quarter

- WAKE – Deuce Lawrence 4-yard run (Connor Calvert kick), 11:49. Demon Deacons 38–3. Drive: 11 plays, 46 yards, 5:07.
- AKR – Elijah Alexander 2-yard pass from Brayden Roggow (Aidan Stire kick), 7:06. Demon Deacons 38–10. Drive: 10 plays, 75 yards, 4:43.
- AKR – Titus Myers 4-yard pass from Brayden Roggow (Aidan Stire kick failed), 0:29. Demon Deacons 38–16. Drive: 11 plays, 79 yards, 4:17.

Statistics	AKR	WAKE
First downs	20	20
Plays–yards	69–305	68–559
Rushes–yards	36–149	33–203
Passing yards	156	356
Passing: comp–att–int	28–33–0	22–35–0
Turnovers	1	0
Time of possession	30:36	29:24

Team	Category	Player	Statistics
Akron	Passing	Cibastian Broughton	21/26, 111 yards
Akron	Rushing	Cibastian Broughton	14 carries, 82 yards
Akron	Receiving	Marcel Williams	4 receptions, 38 yards
Wake Forest	Passing	Gio Lopez	21/32, 350 yards, 3 TD
Wake Forest	Rushing	Ty Clark III	7 carries, 105 yards
Wake Forest	Receiving	Carlos Hernandez	5 receptions, 165 yards, TD

=== at Purdue ===
Wake Forest Demon Deacons (1–0) at Purdue Boilermakers (1–0) – Game summary

Quarter	1	2	3	4	OT	2OT	Total
Demon Deacons	7	10	3	3	7	8	38
Boilermakers	7	3	3	10	7	6	36

at Ross–Ade Stadium • West Lafayette, Indiana

- Date: September 12
- Game time: 12:00 p.m. EDT
- Game weather: Cloudy • Temperature: 77 °F (25 °C) • Wind: W at 6 miles per hour (9.7 km/h)
- Game attendance: 50,363
- Referee: Chris Coyte
- TV announcers (FS1): Noah Reed and Robert Smith

Game information

First quarter

- PUR – Fame Ijeboi 14-yard run (Jacobo Echeverria Lozano kick), 10:43. Boilermakers 7–0. Drive: 8 plays, 75 yards, 4:17.
- WAKE – Ty Clark III 4-yard run (Connor Calvert kick), 4:58. Tied 7–7. Drive: 13 plays, 72 yards, 5:40.

Second quarter

- WAKE – Connor Calvert 39-yard field goal, 11:49. Demon Deacons 10–7. Drive: 10 plays, 58 yards, 4:26.
- WAKE – Gio Lopez 1-yard run (Connor Calvert kick), 3:55. Demon Deacons 17–7. Drive: 10 plays, 76 yards, 5:23.
- PUR – Jacobo Echeverria Lozano 22-yard field goal, 0:02. Demon Deacons 17–10. Drive: 15 plays, 71 yards, 3:53.

Third quarter

- WAKE – Connor Calvert 22-yard field goal, 9:31. Demon Deacons 20–10. Drive: 12 plays, 71 yards, 5:29.
- PUR – Jacobo Echeverria Lozano 30-yard field goal, 4:49. Demon Deacons 20–13. Drive: 10 plays, 63 yards, 4:42.

Fourth quarter

- WAKE – Connor Calvert 44-yard field goal, 9:13. Demon Deacons 23–13. Drive: 8 plays, 73 yards, 4:15.
- PUR – Fame Ijeboi 7-yard run (Jacobo Echeverria Lozano kick), 3:53. Demon Deacons 23–20. Drive: 10 plays, 75 yards, 5:20.
- PUR – Jacobo Echeverria Lozano 20-yard field goal, 0:03. Tied 23–23. Drive: 11 plays, 59 yards, 3:31.

First overtime

- WAKE – Bryce Kania 24-yard pass from Gio Lopez (Connor Calvert kick). Demon Deacons 30–23. Drive: 2 plays, 25 yards.
- PUR – De'Nylon Morrissette 9-yard pass from Ryan Browne (Jacobo Echeverria Lozano kick). Tied 30–30. Drive: 6 plays, 25 yards.

Second overtime

- PUR – Fame Ijeboi 3-yard run (two-point conversion failed). Boilermakers 36–30. Drive: 7 plays, 25 yards.
- WAKE – Gio Lopez 3-yard run (Gio Lopez run). Demon Deacons 38–36. Drive: 8 plays, 25 yards.

Statistics	WAKE	PUR
First downs	25	29
Plays–yards	68–411	82–455
Rushes–yards	41–186	40–126
Passing yards	225	329
Passing: comp–att–int	16–27–0	32–42–0
Turnovers	0	0
Time of possession	27:48	32:12

Team	Category	Player	Statistics
Wake Forest	Passing	Gio Lopez	16/27, 225 yards, TD
Wake Forest	Rushing	Gio Lopez	13 carries, 59 yards, 2 TD
Wake Forest	Receiving	Carlos Hernandez	6 receptions, 88 yards
Purdue	Passing	Ryan Browne	32/42, 329 yards, TD
Purdue	Rushing	Fame Ijeboi	27 carries, 114 yards, 3 TD
Purdue	Receiving	Chauncey Magwood	5 receptions, 77 yards

=== vs. No. 5 Miami (FL) ===
No. 5 Miami Hurricanes (2–0) at Wake Forest Demon Deacons (2–0) – Game summary

Quarter	1	2	3	4	Total
No. 5 Hurricanes	7	17	7	2	33
Demon Deacons	7	0	6	7	20

at Allegacy Federal Credit Union Stadium • Winston-Salem, North Carolina

- Date: September 18
- Game time: 7:30 p.m. EDT
- Game weather: Sunny
- Game attendance: 32,147
- Referee: Riley Johnson
- TV announcers (ESPN): Mike Monaco, Jordan Rodgers and Dana Boyle

Statistics	MIA	WAKE
First downs	23	20
Plays–yards	68–378	62–334
Rushes–yards	34–158	16–22
Passing yards	220	312
Passing: comp–att–int	30–34–0	29–46–1
Turnovers	0	1
Time of possession	33:24	26:36

Team	Category	Player	Statistics
Miami (FL)	Passing	Darian Mensah	30/34, 220 yards, 3 TD
Miami (FL)	Rushing	Mark Fletcher Jr.	16 carries, 85 yards, TD
Miami (FL)	Receiving	Malachi Toney	12 receptions, 114 yards, TD
Wake Forest	Passing	Gio Lopez	29/46, 312 yards, 3 TD, INT
Wake Forest	Rushing	Deuce Lawrence	6 carries, 27 yards
Wake Forest	Receiving	Jack Foley	6 receptions, 118 yards, TD

=== at No. 16 Louisville ===
Wake Forest Demon Deacons (2–1) at No. 16 Louisville Cardinals (2–1) – Game summary

Quarter	1	2	3	4	Total
Demon Deacons	3	21	3	3	30
No. 16 Cardinals	7	14	6	0	27

at L&N Federal Credit Union Stadium • Louisville, Kentucky

- Date: September 26
- Game time: 12:00 p.m. EDT
- Game weather: Sunny • Temperature: 72 °F (22 °C) • Wind: NE at 7 miles per hour (11 km/h)
- Game attendance: 46,042
- Referee: Tim Hedgepeth
- TV announcers (ESPN): Tom Hart, Roddy Jones, and Quint Kessenich

Game information

First quarter

- (6:18) WF – Connor Calvert 39-yard field goal (Drive: 6 plays, 38 yards, 2:33; Wake Forest 3–0)
- (0:21) LOU – Lincoln Kienholz 5-yard run (Carson Hilbert kick) (Drive: 11 plays, 75 yards, 5:57; Louisville 7–3)

Second quarter

- (13:34) WF – Ty Clark III 6-yard run (Connor Calvert kick) (Drive: 7 plays, 75 yards, 1:47; Wake Forest 10–7)
- (7:32) LOU – Lincoln Kienholz 6-yard run (Carson Hilbert kick) (Drive: 11 plays, 75 yards, 6:02; Louisville 14–10)
- (5:49) WF – Carlos Hernandez 77-yard pass from Gio Lopez (Connor Calvert kick) (Drive: 4 plays, 88 yards, 1:38; Wake Forest 17–14)
- (1:19) WF – Ty Clark III 6-yard run (Connor Calvert kick) (Drive: 5 plays, 65 yards, 2:27; Wake Forest 24–14)
- (0:57) LOU – Jaleel Skinner 61-yard pass from Lincoln Kienholz (Carson Hilbert kick) (Drive: 3 plays, 75 yards, 0:22; Wake Forest 24–21)

Third quarter

- (9:37) LOU – Carson Hilbert 41-yard field goal (Drive: 8 plays, 42 yards, 3:59; Tied 24–24)
- (4:58) WF – Connor Calvert 35-yard field goal (Drive: 12 plays, 58 yards, 4:39; Wake Forest 27–24)
- (0:42) LOU – Carson Hilbert 54-yard field goal (Drive: 9 plays, 38 yards, 4:16; Tied 27–27)

Fourth quarter

- (6:20) WF – Connor Calvert 32-yard field goal (Drive: 11 plays, 48 yards, 6:35; Wake Forest 30–27)

Statistics	WAKE	LOU
First downs	20	24
Plays–yards	61–402	74–399
Rushes–yards	42–177	38–75
Passing yards	225	324
Passing: comp–att–int	12–19–0	27–36–1
Turnovers	1	1
Time of possession	26:26	33:34

Team	Category	Player	Statistics
Wake Forest	Passing	Gio Lopez	12/19, 225 yards, TD
Wake Forest	Rushing	Ty Clark III	21 carries, 91 yards, 2 TD
Wake Forest	Receiving	Carlos Hernandez	9 receptions, 194 yards, TD
Louisville	Passing	Lincoln Kienholz	27/36, 324 yards, TD, INT
Louisville	Rushing	Keyjuan Brown	12 carries, 48 yards
Louisville	Receiving	Tre Richardson	5 receptions, 85 yards

=== vs. Stanford ===
Stanford Cardinal (2–2) at Wake Forest Demon Deacons (3–1) – Game summary

Quarter	1	2	3	4	Total
Cardinal	0	3	0	0	3
Demon Deacons	15	14	14	14	57

at Allegacy Federal Credit Union Stadium • Winston-Salem, North Carolina

- Date: October 3
- Game time: 12:00 p.m. EDT
- Game weather: Sunny
- Game attendance: 29,188
- Referee: Jon Noli
- TV announcers (ACCN): Jorge Sedano, Rodney McLeod, and Kendra Douglas

Statistics	STAN	WAKE
First downs	13	26
Plays–yards	67–197	67–519
Rushes–yards	34–49	37–197
Passing yards	148	322
Passing: comp–att–int	21–33–1	22–30–0
Turnovers	1	1
Time of possession	31:14	28:46

Team	Category	Player	Statistics
Stanford	Passing	Davis Warren	19/30, 136 yards, INT
Stanford	Rushing	Micah Ford	16 carries, 45 yards
Stanford	Receiving	Nico Brown	4 receptions, 42 yards
Wake Forest	Passing	Gio Lopez	20/27, 265 yards, 2 TD
Wake Forest	Rushing	Gio Lopez	12 carries, 88 yards, 3 TD
Wake Forest	Receiving	Carlos Hernandez	7 receptions, 87 yards

=== at NC State (rivalry) ===
Wake Forest Demon Deacons (4–1) at NC State Wolfpack (3–2) – Game summary

Quarter	1	2	3	4	Total
Demon Deacons	7	3	21	7	38
Wolfpack	7	7	0	0	14

at Carter–Finley Stadium • Raleigh, North Carolina

- Date: October 10
- Game time: 12:00 p.m. EDT
- Game weather: Rain • Temperature: 65 °F (18 °C) • Wind: NE at 10 miles per hour (16 km/h)
- Game attendance: 56,919
- Referee: Garrett Dickerson
- TV announcers (The CW): Thom Brennaman, Jason Cabinda, and Wes Bryant

Statistics	WAKE	NCSU
First downs	22	16
Plays–yards	69–387	64–258
Rushes–yards	36–84	24–15
Passing yards	303	243
Passing: comp–att–int	26–33–0	29–40–0
Turnovers	0	1
Time of possession	31:57	28:30

Team	Category	Player	Statistics
Wake Forest	Passing	Gio Lopez	26/33, 303 yards, 3 TD
Wake Forest	Rushing	Deuce Lawrence	8 carries, 46 yards, TD
Wake Forest	Receiving	Jack Foley	8 receptions, 156 yards, TD
NC State	Passing	CJ Bailey	28/39, 241 yards, TD
NC State	Rushing	Davion Gause	7 carries, 11 yards
NC State	Receiving	Keenan Jackson	5 receptions, 61 yards

=== at California ===
No. 21 Wake Forest Demon Deacons (5–1) at California Golden Bears (3–3) – Game summary

Quarter	1	2	3	4	Total
No. 21 Demon Deacons	14	20	7	0	41
Golden Bears	0	0	0	7	7

at California Memorial Stadium • Berkeley, California

- Date: October 17
- Game time: 10:30 p.m. EDT
- Game weather: Clear • Temperature: 68 °F (20 °C) • Wind: SE at 5 miles per hour (8.0 km/h)
- Referee: Nolan Dumas
- TV announcers (ESPN2): Chuckie Kempf, Dustin Fox, and Lauren Sisler

Statistics	WAKE	CAL
First downs	24	20
Plays–yards	62–509	68–266
Rushes–yards	36–220	21–75
Passing yards	289	191
Passing: comp–att–int	19–26–0	32–47–0
Turnovers	0	0
Time of possession	27:52	32:08

Team	Category	Player	Statistics
Wake Forest	Passing	Gio Lopez	16/23, 267 yards, 4 TD
Wake Forest	Rushing	Jamar Searcy	5 carries, 61 yards, TD
Wake Forest	Receiving	Dominick Barry	4 receptions, 102 yards, 3 TD
California	Passing	Jaron-Keawe Sagapolutele	15/18, 110 yards, TD
California	Rushing	Ashten Emory	12 carries, 56 yards
California	Receiving	Chase Hendricks	8 receptions, 54 yards

=== vs. Virginia ===
Virginia Cavaliers (4–4) at No. 14 Wake Forest Demon Deacons (6–1) – Game summary

Quarter	1	2	3	4	Total
Cavaliers	0	0	7	0	7
No. 14 Demon Deacons	10	10	24	7	51

at Allegacy Federal Credit Union Stadium • Winston-Salem, North Carolina

- Date: October 31
- Game time: 3:45 p.m. EST
- TV announcers (ESPN2): Roy Philpott, Brock Osweiler, and Sherree Burress

Statistics	UVA	WAKE
First downs	18	28
Plays–yards	64-330	72-538
Rushes–yards	19-16	51-309
Passing yards	314	229
Passing: comp–att–int	32-45-0	13-21-0
Time of possession	26:17	33:43

Team	Category	Player	Statistics
Virginia	Passing	Beau Pribula	20/29, 212 yards, 1 TD, INT
Virginia	Rushing	Solomon Beebe	3 carries, 9 yards
Virginia	Receiving	Da'Shawn Martin	9 receptions, 119 yards, 1 TD
Wake Forest	Passing	Gio Lopez	13/21, 229 yards, 1 TD
Wake Forest	Rushing	Jamar Searcy	8 carries, 78 yards, 1 TD
Wake Forest	Receiving	Carlos Hernandez	8 receptions, 136 yards, 1 TD

=== vs. Merrimack ===
Merrimack Warriors (4–5) at No. 16 Wake Forest Demon Deacons (7–1) – Game summary

Quarter	1	2	3	4	Total
Warriors (FCS)	0	0	0	0	0
No. 16 Demon Deacons	20	29	14	14	77

at Allegacy Federal Credit Union Stadium • Winston-Salem, North Carolina

- Date: November 7
- Game time: 3:30 p.m. EST
- TV announcers (ACCN): Roxy Bernstein, Rodney McLeod, and Madison Hock

Statistics	MRMK	WAKE
First downs	11	31
Plays–yards	73-202	61-730
Rushes–yards	38-102	28-184
Passing yards	100	546
Passing: comp–att–int	16-35-2	27-33-0
Time of possession	36:40	23:20

Team	Category	Player	Statistics
Merrimack	Passing	AJ Hariston Jr	11/27, 80 yards, INT
Merrimack	Rushing	DeMarcus McElroy	9 carries, 26 yards
Merrimack	Receiving	Austin Palmer	5 receptions, 48 yards
Wake Forest	Passing	Steele Pizzella	23/28, 432 yards, 3 TD
Wake Forest	Rushing	Steele Pizzella	7 carries, 63 yards, 1 TD
Wake Forest	Receiving	Jack Foley	6 receptions, 162 yards

=== at SMU ===
No. 13 Wake Forest Demon Deacons (8–1) at SMU Mustangs (7–2) – Game summary

Quarter	1	2	3	4	Total
No. 13 Demon Deacons	14	28	0	7	49
Mustangs	0	0	7	0	7

at Gerald J. Ford Stadium • University Park, Texas

- Date: November 14
- Game time: 12:00 p.m. EDT
- TV announcers (ESPN): Tom Hart, Roddy Jones, and Quint Kessenich

Statistics	WAKE	SMU
First downs	23	14
Plays–yards	75-535	62-275
Rushes–yards	45-286	27-66
Passing yards	249	209
Passing: comp–att–int	18-30-0	22-35-1
Time of possession	36:59	23:01

Team	Category	Player	Statistics
Wake Forest	Passing	Gio Lopez	14/25, 201 yards, TD
Wake Forest	Rushing	Ty Clark III	11 carries, 77 yards, TD
Wake Forest	Receiving	Carlos Hernandez	6 receptions, 94 yards, TD
SMU	Passing	Kevin Jennings	22/35, 209 yards, TD, INT
SMU	Rushing	Kendrick Raphael	15 carries, 54 yards
SMU	Receiving	Randy Pittman Jr.	5 receptions, 76 yards

=== at Georgia Tech ===
No. 11 Wake Forest Demon Deacons (9–1) at Georgia Tech Yellow Jackets (3–7) – Game summary

Quarter	1	2	3	4	Total
No. 11 Demon Deacons	0	0	0	0	0
Yellow Jackets	0	0	0	0	0

at Bobby Dodd Stadium • Atlanta, Georgia

- Date: November 21
- Game time: 12:00 p.m. EDT
- TV announcers (ESPN): Joe Tessitore, Jesse Palmer, and Kris Budden

Statistics	WAKE	GT
First downs		
Plays–yards		
Rushes–yards		
Passing yards		
Passing: comp–att–int		
Time of possession		

Team	Category	Player	Statistics
Wake Forest	Passing		
Wake Forest	Rushing		
Wake Forest	Receiving		
Georgia Tech	Passing		
Georgia Tech	Rushing		
Georgia Tech	Receiving		

=== vs. Duke ===
Duke Blue Devils (7–4) at Wake Forest Demon Deacons (10–1) – Game summary

Quarter	1	2	3	4	Total
Blue Devils	0	0	0	0	0
Demon Deacons	0	0	0	0	0

at Allegacy Federal Credit Union Stadium • Winston-Salem, North Carolina

- Date: November 28
- Game time: TBD

Statistics	DUKE	WAKE
First downs		
Plays–yards		
Rushes–yards		
Passing yards		
Passing: comp–att–int		
Time of possession		

Team	Category	Player	Statistics
Duke	Passing		
Duke	Rushing		
Duke	Receiving		
Wake Forest	Passing		
Wake Forest	Rushing		
Wake Forest	Receiving		
