= Elo Modozie =

American football player

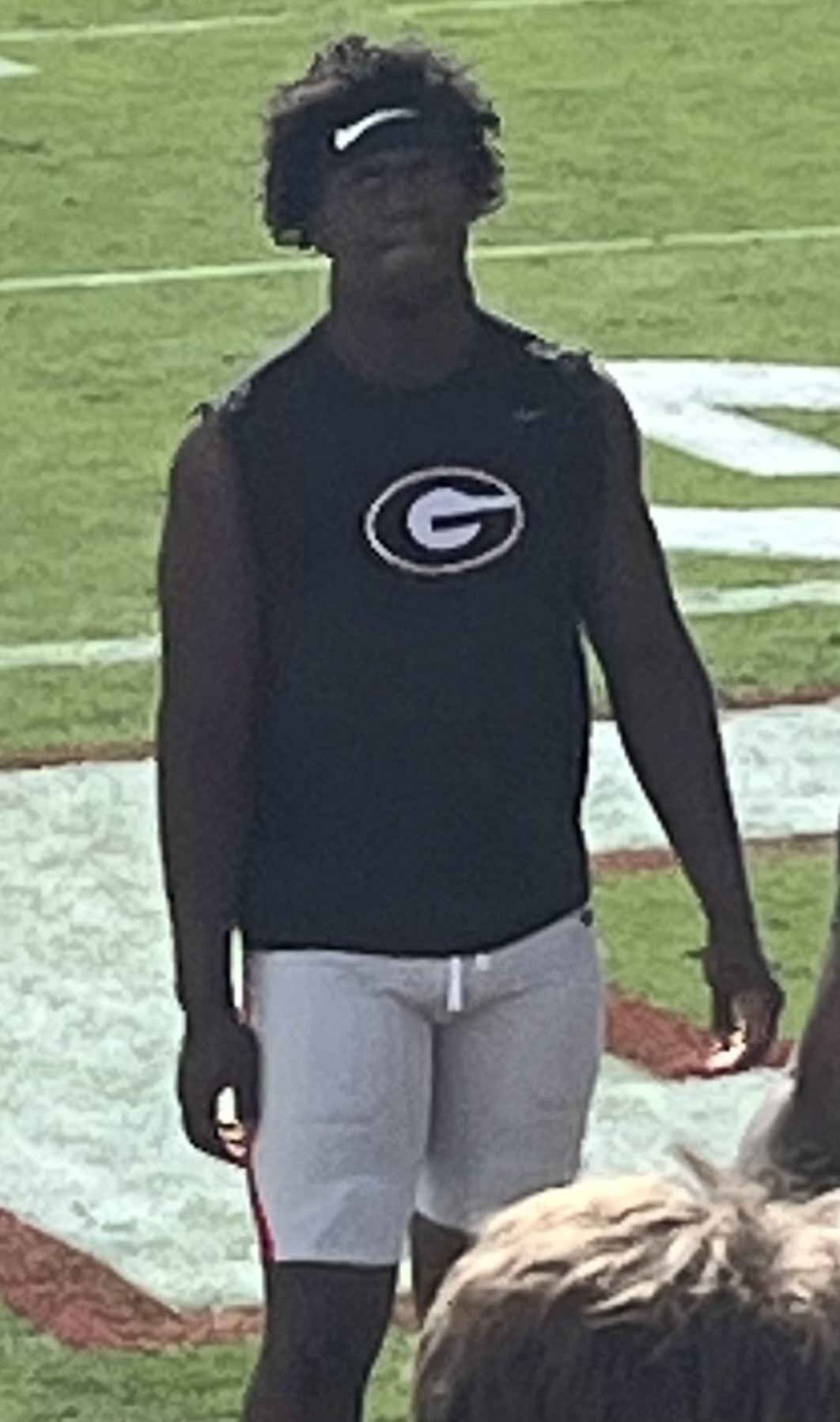
- Modozie in 2025

No. 18 – Purdue Boilermakers
- Position: Linebacker
- Class: Senior

Personal information
- Listed height: 6 ft 4 in (1.93 m)
- Listed weight: 255 lb (116 kg)

Career information
- High school: Bartram Trail (St. Johns County, Florida)
- College: Army (2023–2024); Georgia (2025); Purdue (2026–present)

Awards and highlights
- Third-team All-AAC (2024)
- Stats at ESPN

Elo Modozie is an American college football linebacker for the Purdue Boilermakers. He previously played for the Army Black Knights and Georgia Bulldogs.

== Early life ==
Modozie attended Bartram Trail High School in St. Johns County, Florida, where he played wide receiver. He committed to play college football for the Army Black Knights.

== College career ==
As a true freshman for Army in 2023, Modozie played in 11 games and had nine tackles and one sack. As a sophomore in 2024, he played in 14 games and recorded 34 tackles and a team-leading 6.5 sacks. After the 2024 season, he entered the transfer portal and transferred to the University of Georgia. After the 2025 season, he entered the transfer portal and transferred to Purdue University.

=== Statistics ===
Year	Team	GP	Tackles					Interceptions					Fumbles			
Year	Team	GP	Solo	Ast	Cmb	TfL	Sck	Int	Yds	Avg	TD	PD	FR	Yds	TD	FF
2023	Army	11	3	6	9	1.0	1.0	0	0	0.0	0	0	0	0	0	0
2024	Army	14	17	17	34	8.0	6.5	0	0	0.0	0	1	0	0	0	0
2025	Georgia	13	4	3	7	0.5	0.0	0	0	0.0	0	0	0	0	0	0
2026	Purdue	2	0	0	0	0.0	0.0	0	0	0.0	0	0	0	0	0	0
Career		40	24	26	50	9.5	7.5	0	0	0.0	0	1	0	0	0	0
