= 2026 Purdue Boilermakers football team =

American college football season

2026 Purdue Boilermakers football
- Conference: Big Ten Conference
- Record: 3–8 (2–6 Big Ten)
- Head coach: Barry Odom (2nd season)
- Offensive coordinator: Josh Henson (2nd season)
- Offensive scheme: Multiple
- Defensive coordinator: Kevin Kane (3rd season; first 9 games)
- Base defense: 3–4
- Captains: Charles Correa; Curt Neal; De'Nylon Morrissette; Hudauri Hines; Jude McCoskey; Ryan Browne
- Home stadium: Ross–Ade Stadium

2026 Big Ten Conference football standings
	Conf.			Overall
Team	W		L	W		L
No. 4 UCLA	7	–	1	10	–	1
No. 8 Indiana	6	–	2	9	–	2
No. 15 Iowa	6	–	2	9	–	2
No. 13 Oregon	6	–	2	8	–	3
No. 18 USC	5	–	3	8	–	3
No. 14 Ohio State	5	–	3	7	–	4
Wisconsin	5	–	3	7	–	4
Nebraska	4	–	4	7	–	4
Washington	4	–	4	7	–	4
Illinois	4	–	4	6	–	5
Minnesota	4	–	4	6	–	5
Michigan	3	–	5	6	–	5
Northwestern	3	–	5	6	–	5
Penn State	3	–	5	6	–	5
Maryland	2	–	6	4	–	7
Purdue	2	–	6	3	–	8
Rutgers	2	–	6	3	–	8
Michigan State	1	–	7	3	–	8
Championship: December 5, 2026
^ – College Football Playoff participant; $ – Conference champion; y – Championship game participant; As of November 22, 2026; Rankings from CFP rankings

The 2026 Purdue Boilermakers football team represents Purdue University as a member of the Big Ten Conference during the 2026 NCAA Division I FBS football season. Led by second-year head coach Barry Odom, the Boilermakers play their home games at Ross–Ade Stadium in West Lafayette, Indiana. After 2 years of going winless in conference and Power 4 play, Purdue snapped an 18-game conference losing streak with a win over Illinois on October 3, 2026. One month later, after a 3-game losing streak and with a defense ranking last in the conference, Purdue fired defensive coordinator Kevin Kane.

== Offseason ==
=== Departures ===
Name	Pos.
Chad Brown	CB
Breylon Charles	DL
An'Darius Coffey	S
Bakyne Coly	OL
Jamarius Dinkins	DL
Christian Earls	TE
Tony Grimes	DB
Michael Jackson III	WR
Jack McCallister	P
Hershey McLaurin	DB
Devin Mockobee	RB
Tahj Ra–El	DB
Myles Slusher	DB
Jalen St. John	OL
Malachi Thomas	RB
T.D. Williams	DB

==== NFL draft ====
Name	Pos.	Team	Round	Pick
E.J Horton Jr.	WR	Indianapolis Colts	UDFA	
C.J. Nunnally IV	DL	Atlanta Falcons	UDFA	
Mani Powell	LB	Tennessee Titans	UDFA	

==== CFL draft ====
Name	Pos.	Team	Round	Pick
Giordano Vaccaro	OL	Ottawa Redblacks	1	1

==== Outgoing transfers ====
Name	No.	Pos.	Height	Weight	Year	Hometown	New school
Nitro Tuggle	0	WR	6'1"	195	SO	Goshen, IN	South Carolina
Smiley Bradford	1	DB	6'0"	195	SO	St Louis, MO	Withdrew/remained at Purdue
Richard Toney Jr.	2	DB	6'0"	195	SR	Arlington, TX	
Malachi Singleton	3	QB	6'1"	235	SO	Kennesaw, GA	Appalachian State
Sterling Smith	3	DB	6'1"	198	JR	Indianapolis, IN	Ball State
Arhmad Branch	6	WR	6'0"	185	SO	Festus, MO	South Florida
Sanders Ellis	6	LB	6'2	240	SO	Nashville, TN	Bowling Green
Alex Sanford Jr.	10	LB	6'1"	232	JR	Oxford, MS	Pitt
Carson Dean	11	LB	6'4"	235	SO	Frisco, TX	Harding
Rico Walker	17	TE	6'3"	250	JR	Hickory, NC	California
Demeco Kennedy	18	DL	6'2"	305	SO	Lexington, KY	Louisville
Winston Berglund	20	LB	6'2"	230	SO	Carmel, IN	Withdrew/remained at Purdue
Jaron Thomas	20	RB	6'0"	210	FR	Elkhart, IN	Minnesota
Jaheim Merriweather	23	RB	6'2"	215	SO	Jackson, TN	Troy
Chalil Cummings	28	DB	5'11"	190	FR	Starke, FL	
D'mon Marable	32	DB	6'0"	207	SO	Knoxville, TN	Withdrew/remained at Purdue
Spencer Porath	35	K	5'11"	200	SO	Brownsburg, IN	Notre Dame
Joey Sumlin	37	LB	6'0"	225	SO	Tucson, AZ	Texas State
BJ Mayes	47	LB	6'0"	205	RS-SO	Aurora, IL	
John Randle Jr.	50	OL	6'4"	293	FR	Horn Lake, MS	Utah State
Marcus Moore Jr.	52	DL	6'1"	310	SO	Massillon, OH	Miami (OH)
Bradyn Joiner	55	OL	6'2"	310	SO	Anniston, AL	Florida State
Tyrell Green	56	OL	6'5"	360	SO	Toledo, OH	
Hank Purvis	58	OL	6'5"	360	SO	Wichita, KS	South Carolina
Justin Schmidt	59	LS	6'1"	233	FR	Pittsburgh, PA	Pitt
Jimmy Johnsen	63	OL	6'4"	320	FR	Crown Point, IN	
Jamarrion Harkless	97	DL	6'3"	345	SO	Lexington, KY	Kentucky

==== Coaching departures ====
Name	Previous position	New position
Michael Scherer	Defensive coordinator / Linebackers	UNLV – Linebackers
Vance Vice	Offensive line coach	None
Lamar Conard	Running backs coach	Ohio – Assistant head coach / Running backs coach

=== Acquisitions ===
==== Incoming transfers ====
Name	No.	Pos.	Height	Weight	Year	Hometown	Prev. school
Micah Banuelos	59	OL	6'2"	310	SO	Auburn, WA	USC
Keyshawn Burgos	11	DL	6'5"	260	SR	Chesterfield, VA	Virginia Tech
Mister Clark	6	DB	6'0"	185	SO	Opa Locka, FL	Florida International
Justin Denson Jr.	21	DB	6'2"	194	SO	Providence, RI	Michigan State
Dylan Drennan	42	P	6'2"	205	FR	Dallas, TX	Buffalo
Kylan Fox	16	TE	6'4"	229	SO	Valdosta, GA	UCF
Jerrick Gibson	4	RB	5'10"	206	SO	Gainesville, FL	Texas
Ta'Vari Hampton	10	DB	6'0"	185	SO	Sanford, FL	Northeastern Oklahoma A&M
Jojo Hayden	0	LB	6'2"	220	SO	East St. Louis, IL	Illinois
Jaylan Hornsby	0	WR	6'3"	215	FR	Winslow, NJ	Syracuse
Fame Ijeboi	2	RB	6'0"	210	FR	Folcroft, PA	Minnesota
Jeremy Lewis	33	DE	6'4"	255	JR	St. Louis, MO	Iowa Western
Rodney Lora	94	DT	6'3"	300	SO	North Arlington, NJ	UCF
Nuku Mafi	68	OL	6'4"	325	FR	Rose Park, UT	Oklahoma State
Jaden Mangham	2	S	6'2"	195	SR	Birmingham, MI	Michigan
Hudson Miller	25	LB	6'0"	235	JR	Indianapolis, IN	Toledo
Elo Modozie	18	EDGE	6'4"	248	JR	Saint Augustine, FL	Georgia
Tre Moore	47	EDGE	6'5"	210	SR	Chandler, AZ	San Diego
Curt Neal	92	DL	6'0"	300	JR	Cornelius, NC	Illinois
Dee Newsome	29	CB	6'3"	170	SO	Tuscumbia, AL	Samford
Bisi Owens	17	WR	6'4"	215	SR	Cooksville, MD	Pennsylvania
Makai Saina	73	OL	6'4"	310	FR	Arlington, TX	USC
Ricky Sampson	13	WR	6'4"	210	JR	Las Vegas, NV	Victor Valley
Don Saunders	7	CB	6'4"	195	JR	San Diego, CA	Utah
Jatavius Shivers	77	OT	6'6"	265	SO	Villa Rica, GA	South Carolina
Wisdom Simms	97	DL	6'4"	315	JR	Kannapolis, NC	North Carolina Central
John Slaughter	13	S	6'2"	200	SO	Clarksdale, MS	Colorado
Anthony Speca	16	LB	6'1"	227	FR	Bridgeville, PA	Penn State
Boaz Stanley	50	OL	6'3"	325	JR	Bogart, GA	South Carolina
Travis Terrell Jr.	20	RB	5'8"	170	SO	Atlanta, GA	Jackson State
Xavier Townsend	3	WR	5'11"	195	JR	Tampa, FL	Iowa State
Asaad Waseem	19	WR	5'11"	175	SO	Apopka, FL	Florida Atlantic

==== Recruiting class ====
College recruiting (2026)
Name	Hometown	School	Height	Weight	Commit date
Josiah Hope; DT	Radcliff, KY	North Hardin High School	6 ft 3 in (1.91 m)	295 lb (134 kg)	Dec 3, 2025
Josiah Hope; DT	Recruit ratings: 247Sports: On3: ESPN:				
Katrell Webb; DE	Suwanee, GA	Collins Hill High School	6 ft 2 in (1.88 m)	230 lb (100 kg)	Jul 12, 2025
Katrell Webb; DE	Recruit ratings: 247Sports: On3: ESPN:				
Jett Goldsberry; S	Lincoln City, IN	Heritage Hills High School	5 ft 11 in (1.80 m)	195 lb (88 kg)	Dec 3, 2025
Jett Goldsberry; S	Recruit ratings: 247Sports: On3: ESPN:				
Cooper McCutchan; TE	Cincinnati, OH	Moeller High School	6 ft 4 in (1.93 m)	225 lb (102 kg)	Nov 24, 2026
Cooper McCutchan; TE	Recruit ratings: 247Sports: On3: ESPN:				
Rico Schrieber; OT	Chicago, IL	Marist High School	6 ft 8 in (2.03 m)	340 lb (150 kg)	Feb 5, 2025
Rico Schrieber; OT	Recruit ratings: 247Sports: On3: ESPN:				
Corin Berry; QB	Covina, CA	Charter Oak High School	6 ft 2 in (1.88 m)	185 lb (84 kg)	Apr 8, 2025
Corin Berry; QB	Recruit ratings: 247Sports: On3: ESPN:				
Izaiah Wright; RB	Gibraltar, MI	O. A. Carlson High School	5 ft 11 in (1.80 m)	205 lb (93 kg)	Apr 8, 2025
Izaiah Wright; RB	Recruit ratings: 247Sports: On3: ESPN:				
Raderrion Daniels; CB	Lake Cormorant, MS	Lake Cormorant High School	6 ft 0 in (1.83 m)	175 lb (79 kg)	Jun 9, 2025
Raderrion Daniels; CB	Recruit ratings: 247Sports: On3: ESPN:				
Terrell Berryhill Jr. OT	East Saint Louis, IL	East St. Louis High School	6 ft 5 in (1.96 m)	260 lb (120 kg)	Jun 21, 2025
Terrell Berryhill Jr. OT	Recruit ratings: 247Sports: On3: ESPN:				
James Williams Jr. OG	Indianapolis, IN	Lawrence Central High School	6 ft 3 in (1.91 m)	270 lb (120 kg)	May 26, 2025
James Williams Jr. OG	Recruit ratings: 247Sports: On3: ESPN:				
Dana Greenhow; S	Tyrone, GA	Sandy Creek High School	5 ft 11 in (1.80 m)	170 lb (77 kg)	Jun 3, 2025
Dana Greenhow; S	Recruit ratings: 247Sports: On3: ESPN:				
Ar'Mari Towns; TE	Selma, AL	Southside High School	6 ft 5 in (1.96 m)	220 lb (100 kg)	Apr 24, 2025
Ar'Mari Towns; TE	Recruit ratings: 247Sports: On3: ESPN:				
Emoni Smith; S	Galloway, OH	Westland High School	6 ft 0 in (1.83 m)	170 lb (77 kg)	Jun 8, 2025
Emoni Smith; S	Recruit ratings: 247Sports: On3: ESPN:				
Aiden Solecki; DE	Downers Grove, IL	Downers Grove North High School	6 ft 3 in (1.91 m)	250 lb (110 kg)	Jun 22, 2025
Aiden Solecki; DE	Recruit ratings: 247Sports: On3: ESPN:				
Brock Brownfield; OT	New Palestine, IN	New Palestine High School	6 ft 3 in (1.91 m)	260 lb (120 kg)	Apr 15, 2025
Brock Brownfield; OT	Recruit ratings: 247Sports: On3: ESPN:				
Brandon Kinsey; WR	Miami, FL	Miami Central High School	5 ft 11 in (1.80 m)	175 lb (79 kg)	Jun 21, 2025
Brandon Kinsey; WR	Recruit ratings: 247Sports: On3: ESPN:				
Dax Noles; S	Norman, OK	Iowa Western Community College	5 ft 11 in (1.80 m)	195 lb (88 kg)	Nov 28, 2025
Dax Noles; S	Recruit ratings: 247Sports: On3: ESPN:				
Max Carmicle; DE	Country Club Hills, IL	Hillcrest High School	6 ft 6 in (1.98 m)	235 lb (107 kg)	Jun 12, 2025
Max Carmicle; DE	Recruit ratings: 247Sports: On3: ESPN:				
JoJo Johnson; WR	Richmond, VA	Benedictine College Prep	6 ft 3 in (1.91 m)	175 lb (79 kg)	Nov 30, 2025
JoJo Johnson; WR	Recruit ratings: 247Sports: On3: ESPN:				
Kobe Cherry; DT	Greenwood, IN	Center Grove High School	6 ft 5 in (1.96 m)	270 lb (120 kg)	Jun 23, 2025
Kobe Cherry; DT	Recruit ratings: 247Sports: On3: ESPN:				
Brayden Sweeney; LB	Grand Rapids, MI	Catholic Central High School	6 ft 2 in (1.88 m)	215 lb (98 kg)	Mar 29, 2025
Brayden Sweeney; LB	Recruit ratings: 247Sports: On3: ESPN:				
Jacobo Echeverria Lozano; K	Upper Saint Clair, PA	Upper Saint Clair High School	5 ft 11 in (1.80 m)	170 lb (77 kg)	Jan 22, 2026
Jacobo Echeverria Lozano; K	Recruit ratings: 247Sports: On3: ESPN:				
Overall recruit ranking: 247Sports: 60 On3: 50 ESPN: 55
Note: In many cases, Scout, Rivals, 247Sports, On3, and ESPN may conflict in their listings of height and weight.; In these cases, the average was taken. ESPN grades are on a 100-point scale.; Sources: "Purdue Boilermakers 2026 Player Commits". ESPN.; "2026 Team Ranking". Rivals.com.; "Purdue 2026 Football Commits". 247Sports.; "Purdue Boilermakers Football Commits". On3.

==== Coaches acquisitions ====
Name	Previous position	New position
Kevin Kane	Minnesota – Outside backers / nickels coach	Defensive coordinator / Linebackers
Zach Crabtree	Fresno State – Offensive line coach	Offensive line coach
Bilal Marshall	Purdue – Offensive analyst	Wide receivers coach

== Preseason ==
=== Spring game ===
The annual spring game took place at Ross-Ade Stadium on April 11, 2026.

== Schedule ==
Date	Time	Opponent	Site	TV	Result	Attendance
September 4	7:00 p.m.	Indiana State*	Ross–Ade Stadium; West Lafayette, IN	BTN	W 44–19	49,019
September 12	12:00 p.m.	Wake Forest*	Ross–Ade Stadium; West Lafayette, IN	FS1	L 36–38 ^{2OT}	50,363
September 19	11:00 p.m.	at UCLA	Rose Bowl; Pasadena, CA	BTN	L 38–52	30,916
September 26	2:00 p.m.	No. 3 Notre Dame*	Ross–Ade Stadium; West Lafayette, IN (rivalry)	NBCSN/Peacock	L 10–49	52,273
October 3	4:15 p.m.	at Illinois	Gies Memorial Stadium; Champaign, IL (rivalry)	BTN	W 24–17	60,670
October 10	8:00 p.m.	Minnesota	Ross–Ade Stadium; West Lafayette, IN	BTN	W 41–13	48,559
October 16	8:00 p.m.	Washington	Ross–Ade Stadium; West Lafayette, IN	FOX	L 26–38	50,941
October 31	4:15 p.m.	at Penn State	Beaver Stadium; University Park, PA	BTN	L 17–31	102,041
November 7	12:30 p.m.	Maryland^{†}	Ross–Ade Stadium; West Lafayette, IN	BTN	L 29–34	51,929
November 14	7:30 p.m.	at No. 15 Iowa	Kinnick Stadium; Iowa City, IA	NBC	L 7–28	69,250
November 21	12:00 p.m.	Wisconsin	Ross–Ade Stadium; West Lafayette, IN	NBC	L 10–42	45,426
November 28	7:00 p.m.	at Indiana	Memorial Stadium; Bloomington, IN (Old Oaken Bucket)	FS1		
*Non-conference game; ^{†}Homecoming; Rankings from AP Poll (and CFP Rankings, after November 4) - Released prior to game; All times are in Eastern time; Source:

== Game summaries ==
=== vs Indiana State (FCS) ===
Indiana State Sycamores (FCS) (0–1) at Purdue Boilermakers (0–0) – Game summary

Quarter	1	2	3	4	Total
Sycamores (FCS)	3	3	0	13	19
Boilermakers	10	6	21	7	44

at Ross–Ade Stadium • West Lafayette, Indiana

- Date: September 4
- Game time: 7:00 p.m. EDT
- Game weather: Sunny • Temperature: 93 °F (34 °C) (Note: Hottest night game played at Ross–Ade Stadium.) • Wind: SW at 8 miles per hour (13 km/h)
- Referee: David Siegle
- TV announcers (BTN): Chris Vosters (play-by-play), Ryan Kerrigan (analyst), and Kelsie Kasper (reporter)

Game information

First quarter

- PUR – Jacobo Echeverria Lozano 39-yard field goal, 11:06. Boilermakers 3–0. Drive: 8 plays, 57 yards, 3:49.
- INST – Sebastian Lopez 28-yard field goal, 7:08. Tied 3–3. Drive: 9 plays, 65 yards, 3:58.
- PUR – Chauncey Magwood 6-yard pass from Ryan Browne (Jacobo Echeverria Lozano kick), 0:04. Boilermakers 10–3. Drive: 12 plays, 75 yards, 7:04.

Second quarter

- PUR – Jacobo Echeverria Lozano 25-yard field goal, 9:16. Boilermakers 13–3. Drive: 11 plays, 73 yards, 4:47.
- INST – Sebastian Lopez 47-yard field goal, 5:09. Boilermakers 13–6. Drive: 8 plays, 46 yards, 4:07.
- PUR – Jacobo Echeverria Lozano 23-yard field goal, 0:00. Boilermakers 16–6. Drive: 11 plays, 65 yards, 1:49.

Third quarter

- PUR – Fame Ijeboi 1-yard run (Jacobo Echeverria Lozano kick), 10:50. Boilermakers 23–6. Drive: 5 plays, 62 yards, 2:35.
- PUR – Tra'Mar Harris 7-yard pass from Ryan Browne (Jacobo Echeverria Lozano kick), 8:28. Boilermakers 30–6. Drive: 3 plays, 48 yards, 1:34.
- PUR – Asaad Waseem 18-yard pass from Ryan Browne (Jacobo Echeverria Lozano kick), 0:21. Boilermakers 37–6. Drive: 5 plays, 80 yards, 2:56.

Fourth quarter

- INST – Jayden Reed 45-yard pass from Brady Allen (Sebastian Lopez kick failed), 12:44. Boilermakers 44–12. Drive: 4 plays, 75 yards, 2:04.
- INST – Max McCool 1-yard run (Sebastian Lopez kick), 4:05. Boilermakers 44–19. Drive: 4 plays, 52 yards, 2:03.

Statistics	INST	PUR
First downs	12	28
Plays–yards	46–284	74–523
Rushes–yards	24–66	40–177
Passing yards	218	346
Passing: comp–att–int	12–22–1	27–34–0
Turnovers	1	0
Time of possession	22:38	37:22

Team	Category	Player	Statistics
Indiana State	Passing	Brady Allen	3/5, 117 yards, TD, INT
Indiana State	Rushing	Elijah Owens	11 carries, 60 yards
Indiana State	Receiving	Jayden Reed	5 receptions, 73 yards, TD
Purdue	Passing	Ryan Browne	23/29, 317 yards, 3 TD
Purdue	Rushing	Fame Ijeboi	11 carries, 87 yards, TD
Purdue	Receiving	Asaad Waseem	6 receptions, 107 yards, TD

=== vs Wake Forest ===
Wake Forest Demon Deacons (1–0) at Purdue Boilermakers (1–0) – Game summary

Quarter	1	2	3	4	OT	2OT	Total
Demon Deacons	7	10	3	3	7	8	38
Boilermakers	7	3	3	10	7	6	36

at Ross–Ade Stadium • West Lafayette, Indiana

- Date: September 12
- Game time: 12:00 p.m. EDT
- Game weather: Cloudy • Temperature: 77 °F (25 °C) • Wind: W at 6 miles per hour (9.7 km/h)
- Game attendance: 50,363
- Referee: Chris Coyte
- TV announcers (FS1): Noah Reed (play-by-play) and Robert Smith (analyst)

Game information

First quarter

- PUR – Fame Ijeboi 14-yard run (Jacobo Echeverria Lozano kick), 10:43. Boilermakers 7–0. Drive: 8 plays, 75 yards, 4:17.
- WAKE – Ty Clark III 4-yard run (Connor Calvert kick), 4:58. Tied 7–7. Drive: 13 plays, 72 yards, 5:40.

Second quarter

- WAKE – Connor Calvert 39-yard field goal, 11:49. Demon Deacons 10–7. Drive: 10 plays, 58 yards, 4:26.
- WAKE – Gio Lopez 1-yard run (Connor Calvert kick), 3:55. Demon Deacons 17–7. Drive: 10 plays, 76 yards, 5:23.
- PUR – Jacobo Echeverria Lozano 22-yard field goal, 0:02. Demon Deacons 17–10. Drive: 15 plays, 71 yards, 3:53.

Third quarter

- WAKE – Connor Calvert 22-yard field goal, 9:31. Demon Deacons 20–10. Drive: 12 plays, 71 yards, 5:29.
- PUR – Jacobo Echeverria Lozano 30-yard field goal, 4:49. Demon Deacons 20–13. Drive: 10 plays, 63 yards, 4:42.

Fourth quarter

- WAKE – Connor Calvert 44-yard field goal, 9:13. Demon Deacons 23–13. Drive: 8 plays, 73 yards, 4:15.
- PUR – Fame Ijeboi 7-yard run (Jacobo Echeverria Lozano kick), 3:53. Demon Deacons 23–20. Drive: 10 plays, 75 yards, 5:20.
- PUR – Jacobo Echeverria Lozano 20-yard field goal, 0:03. Tied 23–23. Drive: 11 plays, 59 yards, 3:31.

First overtime

- WAKE – Bryce Kania 24-yard pass from Gio Lopez (Connor Calvert kick). Demon Deacons 30–23. Drive: 2 plays, 25 yards.
- PUR – De'Nylon Morrissette 9-yard pass from Ryan Browne (Jacobo Echeverria Lozano kick). Tied 30–30. Drive: 6 plays, 25 yards.

Second overtime

- PUR – Fame Ijeboi 3-yard run (two-point conversion failed). Boilermakers 36–30. Drive: 7 plays, 25 yards.
- WAKE – Gio Lopez 3-yard run (Gio Lopez run). Demon Deacons 38–36. Drive: 8 plays, 25 yards.

Statistics	WAKE	PUR
First downs	25	29
Plays–yards	68–411	82–455
Rushes–yards	41–186	40–126
Passing yards	225	329
Passing: comp–att–int	16–27–0	32–42–0
Turnovers	0	0
Time of possession	27:48	32:12

Team	Category	Player	Statistics
Wake Forest	Passing	Gio Lopez	16/27, 225 yards, TD
Wake Forest	Rushing	Gio Lopez	13 carries, 59 yards, 2 TD
Wake Forest	Receiving	Carlos Hernandez	6 receptions, 88 yards
Purdue	Passing	Ryan Browne	32/42, 329 yards, TD
Purdue	Rushing	Fame Ijeboi	27 carries, 114 yards, 3 TD
Purdue	Receiving	Chauncey Magwood	5 receptions, 77 yards

=== at UCLA ===
Purdue Boilermakers (1–1) at UCLA Bruins (2–0) – Game summary

Quarter	1	2	3	4	Total
Boilermakers	7	14	10	7	38
Bruins	21	3	14	14	52

at Rose Bowl • Pasadena, California

- Date: September 19
- Game time: 11:00 p.m. EDT
- Game weather: Sunny • Temperature: 72 °F (22 °C) • Wind: SW at 3 miles per hour (4.8 km/h)
- Game attendance: 30,916
- Referee: Jason Nickleby
- TV announcers (BTN): Jason Horowitz (play-by-play), Brock Vereen (analyst), and Kelsie Kasper (sideline)

Game information
First quarter
- UCLA – Semaj Morgan 20-yard pass from Nico Iamaleava (Mateen Bhaghani kick), 11:56. Bruins 7–0. Drive: 7 plays, 79 yards, 2:58.
- PUR – Xavier Townsend 75-yard pass from Ryan Browne (Jacobo Echeverria Lozano kick), 11:45. Tied 7–7. Drive: 1 plays, 75 yards, 0:11.
- UCLA – Semaj Morgan 27-yard pass from Nico Iamaleava (Mateen Bhaghani kick), 8:26. Bruins 14–7. Drive: 6 plays, 75 yards, 3:19.
- UCLA – Wayne Knight 6-yard run (Mateen Bhaghani kick), 4:34. Bruins 21–7. Drive: 7 plays, 44 yards, 3:22.

Second quarter

- PUR – Fame Ijeboi 2-yard run (Jacobo Echeverria Lozano kick), 13:45. Bruins 21–14. Drive: 13 plays, 75 yards, 5:49.
- PUR – Xavier Townsend 20-yard pass from Ryan Browne (Jacobo Echeverria Lozano kick), 2:12. Tied 21–21. Drive: 8 plays, 95 yards, 3:57.
- UCLA – Mateen Bhaghani 34-yard field goal, 0:04. Bruins 24–21. Drive: 13 plays, 76 yards, 2:01.

Third quarter

- PUR – George Burhenn 30-yard pass from Ryan Browne (Jacobo Echeverria Lozano kick), 13:01. Boilermakers 28–24. Drive: 5 plays, 75 yards, 1:59.
- UCLA – Anthony Woods 16-yard run (Mateen Bhaghani kick), 10:23. Bruins 31–28. Drive: 5 plays, 75 yards, 2:38.
- UCLA – Wayne Knight 7-yard run (Mateen Bhaghani kick), 8:58. Bruins 38–28. Drive: 3 plays, 27 yards, 1:18.
- PUR – Jacobo Echeverria Lozano 27-yard field goal, 4:29. Bruins 38–31. Drive: 10 plays, 65 yards, 4:29.

Fourth quarter

- UCLA – Jaivian Thomas 17-yard run (Mateen Bhaghani kick), 14:56. Bruins 45–31. Drive: 13 plays, 75 yards, 4:33.
- PUR – Fame Ijeboi 1-yard run (Jacobo Echeverria Lozano kick), 12:38. Bruins 45–38. Drive: 5 plays, 70 yards, 2:18.
- UCLA – Landon Ellis 6-yard pass from Nico Iamaleava (Mateen Bhaghani kick), 7:45. Bruins 52–38. Drive: 3 plays, 74 yards, 1:34.

Statistics	PUR	UCLA
First downs	23	35
Plays–yards	59–488	80–645
Rushes–yards	28–63	48–369
Passing yards	425	276
Passing: comp–att–int	20–31–1	19–32–0
Turnovers	3	0
Time of possession	23:50	36:10

Team	Category	Player	Statistics
Purdue	Passing	Ryan Browne	19/30, 378 yards, 3 TD, INT
Purdue	Rushing	Fame Ijeboi	17 carries, 47 yards, 2 TD
Purdue	Receiving	Xavier Townsend	6 receptions, 162 yards, 2 TD
UCLA	Passing	Nico Iamaleava	19/31, 276 yards, 3 TD
UCLA	Rushing	Wayne Knight	18 carries, 177 yards, 2 TD
UCLA	Receiving	Semaj Morgan	4 receptions, 72 yards, 2 TD

=== vs No. 3 Notre Dame (rivalry) ===
No. 3 Notre Dame Fighting Irish (3–0) at Purdue Boilermakers (1–2) – Game summary

Quarter	1	2	3	4	Total
No. 3 Fighting Irish	7	28	0	14	49
Boilermakers	0	0	3	7	10

at Ross–Ade Stadium • West Lafayette, Indiana

- Date: September 26
- Game time: 2:00 p.m. EDT
- Game weather: Sunny • Temperature: 71 °F (22 °C) • Wind: NE at 5 miles per hour (8.0 km/h)
- Game attendance: 52,273
- Referee: Mike Roche
- TV announcers (NBCSN/Peacock): Paul Burmeister (play-by-play), Yogi Roth (analyst), and Caroline Pineda (sideline)

Game information
First quarter
- ND – Micah Gilbert 27-yard pass from CJ Carr (Spencer Porath kick), 4:09. Fighting Irish 7–0. Drive: 4 plays, 53 yards, 1:37.

Second quarter

- ND – Aneyas Williams 22-yard run (Spencer Porath kick), 14:56. Fighting Irish 14–0. Drive: 4 plays, 86 yards, 1:22.
- ND – CJ Carr 1-yard run (Spencer Porath kick), 5:47. Fighting Irish 21–0. Drive: 13 plays, 85 yards, 5:59.
- ND – Drayk Bowen 15-yard fumble return (Spencer Porath kick), 4:15. Fighting Irish 28–0. Drive: 5 plays, 68 yards, 2:54.
- ND – Nolan James Jr. 3-yard pass from CJ Carr (Spencer Porath kick), 0:29. Fighting Irish 35–0. Drive: 6 plays, 49 yards, 1:19.

Third quarter

- PUR – Jacobo Echeverria Lozano 47-yard field goal, 4:10. Fighting Irish 35–3. Drive: 6 plays, 20 yards, 3:35.

Fourth quarter

- ND – Cooper Flanagan 2-yard pass from CJ Carr (Spencer Porath kick), 13:32. Fighting Irish 42–3. Drive: 10 plays, 73 yards, 5:34.
- ND – Matt Jeffery 4-yard pass from Noah Grubbs (Spencer Porath kick), 4:05. Fighting Irish 49–3. Drive: 7 plays, 87 yards, 3:33.
- PUR – Bisi Owens 14-yard pass from Evans Chuba (Jacobo Echeverria Lozano kick), 0:09. Fighting Irish 49–10. Drive: 10 plays, 75 yards, 3:59.

Statistics	ND	PUR
First downs	19	16
Plays–yards	58–444	68–218
Rushes–yards	32–177	31–40
Passing yards	267	178
Passing: comp–att–int	16–26–1	25–37–0
Turnovers	1	1
Time of possession	24:44	35:16

Team	Category	Player	Statistics
Notre Dame	Passing	CJ Carr	14/22, 237 yards, 3 TD, 1 INT
Notre Dame	Rushing	Aneyas Williams	14 carries, 80 yards, 1 TD
Notre Dame	Receiving	Micah Gilbert	2 receptions, 83 yards, 1 TD
Purdue	Passing	Ryan Browne	18/28, 111 yards
Purdue	Rushing	Fame Ijeboi	12 carries, 41 yards
Purdue	Receiving	Tra'Mar Harris	3 receptions, 36 yards

=== at Illinois (rivalry) ===
Purdue Boilermakers (1–3) at Illinois Fighting Illini (2–2) – Game summary

Quarter	1	2	3	4	Total
Boilermakers	3	10	3	8	24
Fighting Illini	0	7	0	10	17

at Gies Memorial Stadium • Champaign, Illinois

- Date: October 3
- Game time: 3:15 p.m. CDT
- Game weather: Sunny • Temperature: 66 °F (19 °C)
- Game attendance: 60,670
- Referee: Jeff Servinski
- TV announcers (BTN): Chris Vosters (play-by-play), Anthony Herron (analyst), and Dannie Rogers (sideline)

Game information
First quarter
- PUR – Jacobo Echeverria Lozano 30-yard field goal, 6:48. Boilermakers 3–0. Drive: 15 plays, 64 yards, 8:12.

Second quarter

- PUR – Jacobo Echeverria Lozano 34-yard field goal, 10:11. Boilermakers 6–0. Drive: 8 plays, 64 yards, 4:46.
- PUR – Tra'Mar Harris 21-yard pass from Ryan Browne (Jacobo Echeverria Lozano kick), 4:16. Boilermakers 13–0. Drive: 8 plays, 78 yards, 3:49.
- ILL – Collin Dixon 7-yard pass from Katin Houser (Ethan Moczulski kick), 0:21. Boilermakers 13–7. Drive: 11 plays, 75 yards, 3:55.

Third quarter

- PUR – Jacobo Echeverria Lozano 33-yard field goal, 6:05. Boilermakers 16–7. Drive: 13 plays, 74 yards, 6:07.

Fourth quarter

- ILL – Ethan Moczulski 54-yard field goal, 8:15. Boilermakers 16–10. Drive: 7 plays, 24 yards, 1:55.
- PUR – Antonio Harris 1-yard run (Ryan Browne run), 4:29. Boilermakers 24–10. Drive: 7 plays, 61 yards, 3:36.
- ILL – Ty Robinson 2-yard pass from Katin Houser (Ethan Moczulski kick), 1:26. Boilermakers 24–17. Drive: 6 plays, 66 yards, 1:35.

Statistics	PUR	ILL
First downs	19	26
Plays–yards	60–345	64–345
Rushes–yards	33–90	27–120
Passing yards	255	225
Passing: comp–att–int	18–27–0	21–37–1
Time of possession	31:33	28:27

Team	Category	Player	Statistics
Purdue	Passing	Ryan Browne	18/27, 255 yards, 1 TD
Purdue	Rushing	Fame Ijeboi	19 carries, 65 yards
Purdue	Receiving	Asaad Waseem	3 receptions, 98 yards
Illinois	Passing	Katin Houser	21/37, 225 yards, 2 TD, 1 INT
Illinois	Rushing	Aidan Laughery	12 carries, 49 yards
Illinois	Receiving	Collin Dixon	10 receptions, 116 yards, 1 TD

=== vs Minnesota ===
Minnesota Golden Gophers (4–1) at Purdue Boilermakers (2–3) – Game summary

Quarter	1	2	3	4	Total
Golden Gophers	0	3	10	0	13
Boilermakers	10	10	7	14	41

at Ross–Ade Stadium • West Lafayette, Indiana

- Date: October 10
- Game time: 8:00 p.m. EDT
- Game weather: Cloudy • Temperature: 67 °F (19 °C) • Wind: E at 6 miles per hour (9.7 km/h)
- Game attendance: 48,559
- Referee: Gregory Blum
- TV announcers (BTN): Wayne Randazzo (play-by-play), Rhett Lewis (analyst), and Caroline Hendershot (sideline)

Game information
First quarter
- PUR – Jacobo Echeverria Lozano 45-yard field goal, 12:53. Boilermakers 3–0. Drive: 6 plays, 41 yards, 2:00.
- PUR – George Burhenn 15-yard pass from Ryan Browne (Jacobo Echeverria Lozano kick), 2:26. Boilermakers 10–0. Drive: 14 plays, 98 yards, 7:55.

Second quarter

- MINN – Luke Drzewiecki 49-yard field goal, 10:48. Boilermakers 10–3. Drive: 7 plays, 29 yards, 2:42.
- PUR – Jacobo Echeverria Lozano 28-yard field goal, 7:38. Boilermakers 13–3. Drive: 9 plays, 65 yards, 3:10.
- PUR – Fame Ijeboi 3-yard run (Jacobo Echeverria Lozano kick), 1:55. Boilermakers 20–3. Drive: 7 plays, 92 yards, 4:09.

Third quarter

- PUR – Fame Ijeboi 1-yard run (Jacobo Echeverria Lozano kick), 9:33. Boilermakers 27–3. Drive: 7 plays, 69 yards, 3:11.
- MINN – Luke Drzewiecki 37-yard field goal, 4:45. Boilermakers 27–6. Drive: 12 plays, 57 yards, 4:48.
- MINN – Jalen Smith 42-yard pass from Drake Lindsey (Luke Drzewiecki kick), 3:11. Boilermakers 27–13. Drive: 3 plays, 5 yards, 0:22.

Fourth quarter

- PUR – Ryan Browne 12-yard run (Jacobo Echeverria Lozano kick), 13:17. Boilermakers 34–13. Drive: 9 plays, 75 yards, 4:54.
- PUR – Fame Ijeboi 1-yard run (Jacobo Echeverria Lozano kick), 7:35. Boilermakers 41–13. Drive: 4 plays, 10 yards, 2:24.

Statistics	MINN	PUR
First downs	10	27
Plays–yards	52–275	71–464
Rushes–yards	13–27	47–305
Passing yards	248	159
Passing: comp–att–int	22–39–1	14–24–0
Time of possession	22:53	37:08

Team	Category	Player	Statistics
Minnesota	Passing	Drake Lindsey	22/39, 248 yards, TD, INT
Minnesota	Rushing	Darius Taylor	7 carries, 15 yards
Minnesota	Receiving	Jalen Smith	3 receptions, 89 yards, TD
Purdue	Passing	Ryan Browne	14/24, 159 yards, TD
Purdue	Rushing	Fame Ijeboi	31 carries, 195 yards, 3 TD
Purdue	Receiving	De'Nylon Morrissette	2 receptions, 51 yards

=== vs Washington ===
Washington Huskies (3–3) at Purdue Boilermakers (3–3) – Game summary

Quarter	1	2	3	4	Total
Huskies	7	17	0	14	38
Boilermakers	3	14	3	6	26

at Ross–Ade Stadium • West Lafayette, Indiana

- Date: October 16
- Game time: 8:00 p.m. EDT
- Game weather: Cloudy • Temperature: 50 °F (10 °C) • Wind: N at 15 miles per hour (24 km/h)
- Game attendance: 50,941
- Referee: Bryan Banks
- TV announcers (FOX): Dan Hellie (play-by-play) and Robert Smith (analyst)

Game information
First quarter
- WASH – Decker DeGraaf 2-yard pass from Elijah Brown (Tyler Robles kick), 6:19. Huskies 7–0. Drive: 10 plays, 61 yards, 5:20.
- PUR – Jacobo Echeverria Lozano 24-yard field goal, 1:54. Huskies 7–3. Drive: 6 plays, 14 yards, 2:06.

Second quarter

- WASH – Tyler Robles 25-yard field goal, 12:40. Huskies 10–3. Drive: 8 plays, 68 yards, 4:14.
- PUR – Antonio Harris 1-yard run (Jacobo Echeverria Lozano kick), 8:28. Tied 10–10. Drive: 8 plays, 87 yards, 4:12.
- WASH – Brian Bonner Jr. 25-yard pass from Elijah Brown (Tyler Robles kick), 6:27. Huskies 17–10. Drive: 5 plays, 79 yards, 1:57.
- PUR – Fame Ijeboi 10-yard pass from Ryan Browne (Jacobo Echeverria Lozano kick), 2:35. Tied 17–17. Drive: 1 plays, 10 yards, 0:04.'
- WASH – Brian Bonner Jr. 1-yard run (Tyler Robles kick), 0:27. Huskies 24–17. Drive: 9 plays, 91 yards, 2:07.

Third quarter

- PUR – Jacobo Echeverria Lozano 48-yard field goal, 3:33. Huskies 24–20. Drive: 6 plays, 11 yards, 3:11.

Fourth quarter

- WASH – Dezmen Roebuck 4-yard pass from Elijah Brown (Tyler Robles kick), 14:12. Huskies 31–20. Drive: 9 plays, 75 yards, 4:21.
- PUR – Ryan Browne 8-yard run (Ryan Browne–George Burhenn pass failed), 11:18. Huskies 31–26. Drive: 7 plays, 75 yards, 2:54.
- WASH – Trey Cooley 53-yard run (Tyler Robles kick), 10:30. Huskies 38–26. Drive: 2 plays, 75 yards, 0:48.

Statistics	WASH	PUR
First downs	24	19
Plays–yards	61–488	68–371
Rushes–yards	34–186	27–98
Passing yards	302	273
Passing: comp–att–int	21–27–3	21–41–2
Time of possession	29:16	30:44

Team	Category	Player	Statistics
Washington	Passing	Elijah Brown	21/27, 302 yards, 3 TD, 3 INT
Washington	Rushing	Trey Cooley	8 carries, 113 yards, TD
Washington	Receiving	Chris Lawson	6 receptions, 103 yards
Purdue	Passing	Ryan Browne	21/41, 273 yards, TD, 2 INT
Purdue	Rushing	Antonio Harris	4 carries, 65 yards, TD
Purdue	Receiving	Asaad Waseem	9 receptions, 116 yards

=== at Penn State ===
Purdue Boilermakers (3–4) at Penn State Nittany Lions (3–4) – Game summary

Quarter	1	2	3	4	Total
Boilermakers	7	7	0	3	17
Nittany Lions	14	7	3	7	31

at Beaver Stadium • University Park, Pennsylvania

- Date: October 31
- Game time: 4:15 p.m. EDT
- Game weather: Sunny
- Game attendance: 102,041
- Referee: Chris Coyte
- TV announcers (BTN): Chris Vosters (play-by-play), Anthony Herron (analyst), and Dannie Rogers (analyst)
- Report: Official report

Game information
First quarter
- PSU – Andrew Rappleyea 4-yard pass from Rocco Becht (Ryan Barker kick), 5:13. Nittany Lions 7–0. Drive: 12 plays, 96 yards, 6:06.
- PUR – Xavier Townsend 33-yard pass from Ryan Browne (Jacobo Echeverria Lozano kick), 3:09. Tied 7–7. Drive: 4 plays, 75 yards, 2:04.
- PSU – Rocco Becht 6-yard run (Ryan Barker kick), 0:50. Nittany Lions 14–7. Drive: 4 plays, 75 yards, 2:19.

Second quarter

- PUR – Jalil Hall 31-yard blocked punt return (Jacobo Echeverria Lozano kick), 8:52. Tied 14–14.
- PSU – Carson Hansen 1-yard run (Ryan Barker kick), 1:48. Nittany Lions 21–14. Drive: 15 plays, 65 yards, 7:04.

Third quarter

- PSU – Ryan Barker 44-yard field goal, 2:11. Nittany Lions 24–14. Drive: 6 plays, 15 yards, 3:32.

Fourth quarter

- PSU – Cam Wallace 2-yard run (Ryan Barker kick), 9:23. Nittany Lions 31–14. Drive: 10 plays, 85 yards, 6:54.
- PUR – Jacobo Echeverria Lozano 49-yard field goal, 6:08. Nittany Lions 31–17. Drive: 9 plays, 44 yards, 3:15.

Statistics	PUR	PSU
First downs	9	22
Plays–yards	44–175	76–457
Rushes–yards	15–33	51–269
Passing yards	142	188
Passing: comp–att–int	10–29–2	17–25–0
Time of possession	16:33	43:27

Team	Category	Player	Statistics
Purdue	Passing	Ryan Browne	10/29, 142 yards, TD, 2 INT
Purdue	Rushing	Fame Ijeboi	11 carries, 20 yards
Purdue	Receiving	Assad Waseem	3 receptions, 64 yards
Penn State	Passing	Rocco Becht	16/24, 175 yards, TD
Penn State	Rushing	Cam Wallace	22 carries, 135 yards, TD
Penn State	Receiving	Benjamin Brahmer	4 receptions, 58 yards

=== vs Maryland ===
Maryland Terrapins (2–6) at Purdue Boilermakers (3–5) – Game summary

Quarter	1	2	3	4	Total
Terrapins	0	7	21	6	34
Boilermakers	3	9	7	10	29

at Ross–Ade Stadium • West Lafayette, Indiana

- Date: November 7
- Game time: 12:30 p.m. EDT
- Game weather: Sunny • Temperature: 50 °F (10 °C) • Wind: NW at 10 miles per hour (16 km/h)
- Game attendance: 51,929
- Referee: Jim Wharrie
- TV announcers (BTN): Cory Provus (play-by-play), Rhett Lewis (analyst), and Caroline Hendershot (sideline)

Game information
First quarter
- PUR – Jacobo Echeverria Lozano 47-yard field goal, 11:39. Boilermakers 3–0. Drive: 9 plays, 34 yards, 3:15.

Second quarter

- PUR – Jacobo Echeverria Lozano 26-yard field goal, 13:03. Boilermakers 6–0. Drive: 12 plays, 60 yards, 5:46.
- PUR – Jacobo Echeverria Lozano 24-yard field goal, 7:20. Boilermakers 9–0. Drive: 7 plays, 69 yards, 3:14.
- MD – Malik Washington 15-yard run (Sean O'Haire kick), 6:34. Boilermakers 9–7. Drive: 3 plays, 46 yards, 0:36.
- PUR – Jacobo Echeverria Lozano 36-yard field goal, 1:45. Boilermakers 12–7. Drive: 10 plays, 53 yards, 4:43.

Third quarter

- MD – Na'eem Abdul-Rahim Gladding 44-yard pass from Malik Washington (Sean O'Haire kick), 8:53. Terrapins 14–12. Drive: 9 plays, 75 yards, 6:07.
- MD – Malik Washington 1-yard run (Sean O'Haire kick), 6:03. Terrapins 21–12. Drive: 4 plays, 2 yards, 2:02.
- PUR – Xavier Townsend 30-yard run (Jacobo Echeverria Lozano kick), 2:54. Terrapins 21–19. Drive: 6 plays, 75 yards, 3:09.
- MD – DeJuan Williams 75-yard run (Sean O'Haire kick), 2:43. Terrapins 28–19. Drive: 1 play, 75 yards, 0:11.

Fourth quarter

- PUR – Jacobo Echeverria Lozano 22-yard field goal, 12:13. Terrapins 28–22. Drive: 11 plays, 69 yards, 5:24.
- MD – Chris Durr Jr. 87-yard pass from Malik Washington (Malik Washington pass failed), 9:13. Terrapins 34–22. Drive: 4 plays, 89 yards, 2:47.
- PUR – Fame Ijeboi 2-yard run (Jacobo Echeverria Lozano kick), 3:50. Terrapins 34–29. Drive: 13 plays, 75 yards, 5:23.

Statistics	MD	PUR
First downs	12	26
Plays–yards	45–390	80–425
Rushes–yards	27–137	42–129
Passing yards	253	296
Passing: comp–att–int	13–18–1	24–38–0
Time of possession	24:04	35:56

Team	Category	Player	Statistics
Maryland	Passing	Malik Washington	13/18, 253 yards, 2 TD, INT
Maryland	Rushing	DeJuan Williams	14 carries, 99 yards, TD
Maryland	Receiving	Chris Durr Jr.	4 receptions, 127 yards, TD
Purdue	Passing	Ryan Browne	24/38, 296 yards
Purdue	Rushing	Antonio Harris	5 carries, 51 yards
Purdue	Receiving	Tra'mar Harris	3 receptions, 76 yards

=== at No. 15 Iowa ===
Purdue Boilermakers (3–6) at No. 15 Iowa Hawkeyes (7–2) – Game summary

Quarter	1	2	3	4	Total
Boilermakers	0	7	0	0	7
No. 15 Hawkeyes	7	14	7	0	28

at Kinnick Stadium • Iowa City, Iowa

- Date: November 14
- Game time: 7:30 p.m.
- Game weather: Clear • Temperature: 38 °F (3 °C)
- Game attendance: 69,250
- Referee: Tim Odey
- TV announcers (NBC): Noah Eagle (play-by-play), Todd Blackledge (analyst), and Kathryn Tappen (sideline)
- Report: Official report

Game information
First quarter
- IOWA – Hank Brown 1-yard run (Caden Buhr kick), 3:19. Hawkeyes 7–0. Drive: 15 plays, 80 yards, 6:57.

Second quarter

- IOWA – Tony Diaz 14-yard run (Caden Buhr kick), 6:35. Hawkeyes 14–0. Drive: 8 plays, 66 yards, 4:20.
- PUR – George Burhenn 3-yard pass from Ryan Browne (Jacobo Echeverria Lozano kick), 1:49. Hawkeyes 14–7. Drive: 11 plays, 75 yards, 4:46.
- IOWA – Braeden Jackson 44-yard pass from Hank Brown (Caden Buhr kick), 0:05. Hawkeyes 21–7. Drive: 11 plays, 83 yards, 1:37.

Third quarter

- IOWA – Xavier Williams 48-yard run (Caden Buhr kick), 11:07. Hawkeyes 28–7. Drive: 7 plays, 75 yards, 3:53.

Fourth quarter

- No scoring plays.

Statistics	PUR	IOWA
First downs	16	27
Plays–yards	56–303	73–434
Rushes–yards	28–99	44–246
Passing yards	204	188
Passing: comp–att–int	17–28–1	20–29–0
Time of possession	24:46	35:14

Team	Category	Player	Statistics
Purdue	Passing	Ryan Browne	14/23, 158 yards, TD, INT
Purdue	Rushing	Fame Ijeboi	15 carries, 64 yards
Purdue	Receiving	Asaad Waseem	6 receptions, 93 yards
Iowa	Passing	Hank Brown	20/29, 188 yards, TD
Iowa	Rushing	L. J. Phillips	23 carries, 123 yards
Iowa	Receiving	Braeden Jackson	4 receptions, 61 yards, TD

=== vs Wisconsin ===
Wisconsin Badgers (6–4) at Purdue Boilermakers (3–7) – Game summary

Quarter	1	2	3	4	Total
Badgers	14	7	7	14	42
Boilermakers	0	10	0	0	10

at Ross–Ade Stadium • West Lafayette, Indiana

- Date: November 21
- Game time: 12 p.m. EST
- Game weather: Sunny • Temperature: 65 °F (18 °C) • Wind: S at 7 miles per hour (11 km/h)
- Game attendance: 45,426
- Referee: John Servinski
- TV announcers (NBC): Jason Benetti (play-by-play), Matt Cassel (analyst), and Ashley ShahAhmadi (sideline)
- Report: Official report

Game information
First quarter
- WIS – Eugene Hilton Jr. 24-yard run (Gavin Lahm kick), 8:01. Badgers 7–0. Drive: 14 plays, 75 yards, 6:59.
- WIS – Colton Joseph 32-yard run (Gavin Lahm kick), 2:57. Badgers 14–0. Drive: 8 plays, 68 yards, 4:15.

Second quarter

- PUR – Jacobo Echeverria Lozano 53-yard field goal, 14:55. Badgers 14–3. Drive: 8 plays, 40 yards, 3:02.
- WIS – Darrion Dupree 49-yard run (Gavin Lahm kick), 14:03. Badgers 21–3. Drive: 2 plays, 75 yards, 0:52.
- PUR – Fame Ijeboi 1-yard run (Jacobo Echeverria Lozano kick), 6:53. Badgers 21–10. Drive: 14 plays, 75 yards, 7:10.

Third quarter

- WIS – Darrion Dupree 1-yard run (Gavin Lahm kick), 5:35. Badgers 28–10. Drive: 12 plays, 74 yards, 7:10.

Fourth quarter

- WIS – Colton Joseph 13-yard pass from Eugene Hilton Jr. (Gavin Lahm kick), 10:59. Badgers 35–10. Drive: 11 plays, 85 yards, 6:27.
- WIS – Colton Joseph 66-yard run (Gavin Lahm kick), 6:07. Badgers 42–10. Drive: 1 play, 66 yards, 0:11.

Statistics	WIS	PUR
First downs	26	17
Plays–yards	70–508	56–199
Rushes–yards	51–381	22–66
Passing yards	127	133
Passing: comp–att–int	13–19–0	13–34–1
Time of possession	35:42	24:18

Team	Category	Player	Statistics
Wisconsin	Passing	Colton Joseph	12/18, 114 yards
Wisconsin	Rushing	Colton Joseph	16 carries, 187 yards, 2 TD
Wisconsin	Receiving	Jaylon Domingeaux	3 receptions, 39 yards
Purdue	Passing	Ryan Browne	13/32, 133 yards, INT
Purdue	Rushing	Fame Ijeboi	10 carries, 40 yards, TD
Purdue	Receiving	Cooper McCutchan	3 receptions, 36 yards

=== at Indiana ===
Purdue Boilermakers (3–8) at Indiana Hoosiers (9–2) – Game summary

Quarter	1	2	Total
Boilermakers			0
Hoosiers			0

at Memorial Stadium • Bloomington, Indiana

- Date: November 28
- Game time: 7 p.m. EST
- TV: FS1

Statistics	PUR	IU
First downs		
Plays–yards		
Rushes–yards		
Passing yards		
Passing: comp–att–int		
Time of possession		

Team	Category	Player	Statistics
Purdue	Passing		
Purdue	Rushing		
Purdue	Receiving		
Indiana	Passing		
Indiana	Rushing		
Indiana	Receiving		

== Personnel ==
=== Roster ===
2026 Purdue Boilermakers football team roster
Players
Coaches
Offense

Pos.	#	Name	Class
WR	0	Jaylan Hornsby	RSo
QB	1	Evans Chuba	RSo
RB	2	Fame Ijeboi	RSo
WR	3	Xavier Townsend	RSr
RB	4	Jerrick Gibson	So
WR	5	Chauncey Magwood	RSr
QB	7	Garyt Odom	Fr
TE	6	Ar'Mari Towns	Fr
WR	8	De'Nylon Morrissette	Sr
WR	9	Jalil Hall	Fr
WR	10	Jesse Watson	RSo
WR	11	Tra'Mar Harris	RSo
WR	12	Corey Smith	Jr
WR	13	Ricky Sampson	Jr
QB	14	Corin Berry	Fr
QB	15	Ryan Browne	RJr
TE	16	Kylan Fox	Jr
WR	17	Bisi Owens	RSr
QB	18	Bennett Meredith	RSr
WR	19	Asaad Waseem	RJr
RB	20	Travis Terrell Jr.	Jr
RB	22	Antonio Harris	Jr
RB	24	Izaiah Wright	Fr
RB	31	Carter Holsworth	RSo
WR	33	Quinn Rosenkranz	Fr
TE	41	Jon Grimmett	Fr
TE	43	Jackson Berryman	RSo
OL	50	Boaz Stanley	RSr
OL	51	Mason Vicari	Jr
OL	52	Rocco Daly	RSo
OL	54	Hayden Timosciek	RSr
OL	55	Marc Nave Jr.	RSo
OL	56	Marques Easley	RSo
OL	57	Tom Ewing	RJr
OL	58	James Wiliams Jr.	Fr
OL	59	Micah Banuelos	RJr
OL	65	Brock Brownfield	Fr
OL	68	Nuku Mafi	RSo
OL	70	Max Parrott	RSo
OL	71	Terrell Berryhill Jr.	Fr
OL	72	Juke McCoskey	Sr
OL	73	Makai Saina	RSo
OL	75	Rico Schrieber	Fr
OL	76	Ethan Trent	RJr
OL	77	Jatavius Shivers	RJr
OL	78	Sankeerth Veluri	Fr
OL	79	Joey Tanona	Sr
WR	80	Brandon Kinsey	Fr
TE	81	George Burhenn	RJr
WR	82	Roman Mercado	RFr
WR	83	Andrew Adkison	RJr
WR	84	Nolan Buckman	RJr
TE	85	Luke Puccinelli	RSo
TE	87	Cooper McCutchan	Fr
WR	88	Jojo Johnson	Fr
TE	89	Luke Klare	RSo
TE	94	Luke Shorter	Fr

Defense

Pos.	#	Name	Class
LB	0	Jojo Hayden	RJr
DB	1	Smiley Bradford	Jr
DB	2	Jaden Mangham	RSr
DB	3	Jett Goldsberry	Fr
DB	4	Hudauri Hines	Jr
LB	5	Charles Correa	Jr
DB	6	Mister Clark	RJr
DB	7	Don Sanders	RSr
DE	8	C. J. Madden	Sr
DL	9	T. J. Lindsey	RSo
DB	10	Ta'Vari Hampton	So
DE	11	Keyshawn Burgos	RSr
DB	12	Ryan Turner	RSr
DB	13	John Slaughter	Sr
DB	14	Emoni Smith	Fr
DB	15	Vi'Naz Cobb	So
LB	16	Anthony Speca	Jr
DB	17	Traveon Wright	RJr
DE	18	Elo Modozie	Sr
DE	19	Landon Brooks	Fr
LB	20	Winston Berglund	RJr
DB	21	Justin Denson Jr.	RSo
DB	22	Maxwell Barbee	Fr
DE	23	Trey Smith	RJr
DB	24	Raderrion Daniels	Fr
LB	25	Hudson Miller	RSr
DB	26	Dax Noles	RSo
LB	27	Owen Davis	RJr
DB	28	Dana Greenhow	Fr
DB	29	Dee Newsome	RJr
LB	30	Parker Meese	Fr
DE	31	Finn Goodman	Fr
DB	32	D'Mon Marable	Jr
DE	33	Jeremy Lewis	Jr
DB	35	D. J. Greene	Fr
DB	36	Kaleb Richmond	Jr
DB	38	Zyntreacs Otey	Fr
DB	39	Isaiah Needam	RSo
DL	40	Ian Jeffries	RJr
DE	41	Mason Alnutt	Fr
LB	42	Brayden Sweeney	Fr
DL	44	Kobe Cherry	Fr
DE	45	Katrell Webb	Fr
LB	47	Tre Moore	RSr
DB	48	Donivan Taylor	Fr
LB	51	Jaxon Ott	Fr
DE	58	Breeon Ishmail	Jr
DE	84	Maximilian Carmicle	Fr
DL	90	Elijah St. John	Sr
DL	91	Aiden Solecki	Fr
DL	92	Curt Neal	RSr
DL	93	Sam Goellner	RSo
DL	94	Rodney Lora	RJr
DL	96	Jordan Cree	Sr
DL	97	Wisdom Simms	Sr
DL	98	Drake Carlson	RJr
DL	99	Josiah Hope	Fr

Special teams

Pos.	#	Name	Class
K	26	Jack Weeter	Jr
P	42	Dylan Drennan	So
P	45	Seth Turner	RJr
LS	46	Luke Raab	RSo
K	92	Jacobo Echeverria Lozano	Fr
P	95	Sam Dubwig	RSo

Head coach

- Barry Odom

Coordinators/assistant coaches

- Cornell Ford – Assistant head coach/running backs
- Kevin Kane – Defensive coordinator / linebackers
- Josh Henson – Offensive coordinator / tight ends
- Darin Hinshaw – Quarterbacks
- Bilal Marshall – Wide receivers
- Charles Clark – Defensive backs
- Zach Crabtree – Offensive linemen
- Kelvin Green – Defensive linemen
- Jake Trump – Defensive ends
- James Shibest – Special teams coordinator
- Ronnell Perkins – Senior defensive analyst
- Neal Renna – Senior defensive analyst
- Dave Steckel – Senior defensive analyst
- Austin Appleby – Offensive analyst
- C.J. Cole – Offensive analyst
- Mitchell Dolinar – Defensive analyst
- Jack Lowary – Defensive analyst
- Nick Porreca – Senior special teams analyst
- Ty Rocconi – Defensive analyst
- Tre'vour Simms – Offensive analyst
- David Spurlock – Offensive analyst
- Kiero Small – Director, strength and conditioning
- Nate Rock – Associate director, strength and conditioning
- Myles Quimby – Associate director, strength and conditioning
- Greg Robinson – Associate director, strength and conditioning
- Cameron Colbert – Assistant director, strength and conditioning

Legend

- (C) Team captain
- (S) Suspended
- (I) Ineligible
- Injured
- Redshirt

Roster
Last update: 04/30/2026

== Statistics ==
=== Individual leaders ===
==== Offense ====
Passing statistics
#	NAME	POS	CMP	ATT	PCT	YDS	AVG/G	CMP%	TD	INT	LONG
	TOTALS										
	OPPONENTS										

Rushing statistics
#	NAME	POS	ATT	YDS	AVG	LNG	TD
	TOTALS						
	OPPONENTS						

Receiving statistics
#	NAME	POS	REC	YDS	AVG	LNG	TD
	TOTALS						
	OPPONENTS						

==== Defense ====
Defensive statistics
#	NAME	POS	SOLO	AST	CMB	TFL	SCK	INT	PD	FF	FR	TD
	TOTALS		0	0	0	0.0	0.0	0	0	0	0	0
	OPPONENTS		0	0	0	0.0	0.0	0	0	0	0	0

==== Special teams ====
Kicking statistics
#	NAME	POS	XPM	XPA	XP%	FGM	FGA	FG%	LNG
	OPPONENTS								

Punting statistics
#	NAME	POS	PUNTS	YDS	AVG	LNG	BLK	TB	I–20
	TOTALS								
	OPPONENTS								

Kick return statistics
#	NAME	POS	RET	YDS	AVG	LNG	TD
	TOTALS						
	OPPONENTS						

Punt return statistics
#	NAME	POS	RET	YDS	AVG	LNG	TD
	TOTALS						
	OPPONENTS						
