= Jim Browne (American football) =

American football player (born 1962)

No. 47
- Position: Running back

Personal information
- Born: March 16, 1962 (age 64); Pontiac, Michigan, U.S.
- Listed height: 6 ft 1 in (1.85 m)
- Listed weight: 215 lb (98 kg)

Career information
- High school: Brother Rice
- College: Boston College
- NFL draft: 1985: undrafted

Career history
- Detroit Lions (1985); Miami Dolphins (1987)*; Los Angeles Raiders (1987); Detroit Drive (1988)
- * Offseason or practice squad member only
- Stats at Pro Football Reference

James Christopher Browne (born March 16, 1962) is an American former professional football player who was a running back for the Los Angeles Raiders of the National Football League (NFL). He played college football for the Boston College Eagles. He was also a member of the Detroit Lions and Miami Dolphins and played for the Detroit Drive in the Arena Football League (AFL).

Browne's son Ryan Browne has been a quarterback for the North Carolina Tarheels as well as the Purdue Boilermakers.
