= Jerry Kaminski =

American football quarterback

No. 1 – North Dakota Fighting Hawks
- Position: Quarterback
- Class: Senior

Personal information
- Listed height: 6 ft 2 in (1.88 m)
- Listed weight: 213 lb (97 kg)

Career information
- High school: Sun Prairie East (Sun Prairie, Wisconsin)
- College: North Dakota (2023–present)
- Stats at ESPN

Jerry Kaminski is an American football quarterback for the North Dakota Fighting Hawks.

== Early life and high school ==
Kaminski grew up in Sun Prairie, Wisconsin and attended Sun Prairie East High School. As a senior, he passed for 2,785 yards and 40 touchdowns and was named the 2022 Wisconsin Offensive Player of the Year.

== College career ==
Kaminski did not play in any games during his freshman season with the North Dakota Fighting Hawks and redshirted. He played sparingly as a sophomore. Kaminski was named North Dakota's starting quarterback going into his junior season. In his first season as a starter, he passed for 2,570 yards and a school-record 26 touchdowns and also rushed for 607 yards and eight touchdowns. After the season, Kaminski was invited to be a counselor at the Manning Passing Academy and won the camp's skills competition.
