= Fame Ijeboi =

American football player

No. 2 – Purdue Boilermakers
- Position: Running back
- Class: Redshirt Sophomore

Personal information
- Listed height: 6 ft 0 in (1.83 m)
- Listed weight: 215 lb (98 kg)

Career information
- High school: William Penn Charter School (Philadelphia, Pennsylvania)
- College: Minnesota (2024–2025); Purdue (2026–present)
- Stats at ESPN

Ohifame Ijeboi (oh-EE-feh-MEH EE-jə-boy) is an American college football running back for the Purdue Boilermakers. He previously played for the Minnesota Golden Gophers.

== Early life ==
Ijeboi attended William Penn Charter School in Philadelphia, Pennsylvania. As a senior, he rushed for 968 yards on 147 carries with 10 touchdowns and also had 23 tackles, two sacks and an interception on defense. He committed to the University of Minnesota to play college football.

== College career ==
Ijeboi redshirted his first year at Minnesota in 2024 after playing in two games and rushing two times for 13 yards. In 2025, he played in 11 games and had 97 carries for 441 yards with two touchdowns and 12 receptions for 54 yards and a touchdown. After the season, Ijeboi entered the transfer portal and committed to the Purdue University. He earned the starting job in 2026 and in his first game had 11 carries for 87 yards and a touchdown.

=== Statistics ===
Year	Team	GP	Rushing				Receiving			
Year	Team	GP	Att	Yds	Avg	TD	Rec	Yds	Avg	TD
2024	Minnesota	2	2	13	6.5	0	0	0	0.0	0
2025	Minnesota	11	97	441	4.5	2	12	54	4.5	1
2026	Purdue	7	130	568	4.4	9	16	107	6.7	1
Career		20	229	1,022	4.5	11	38	161	5.8	2
