= Ryan Browne (American football) =

American football player (born 2003)

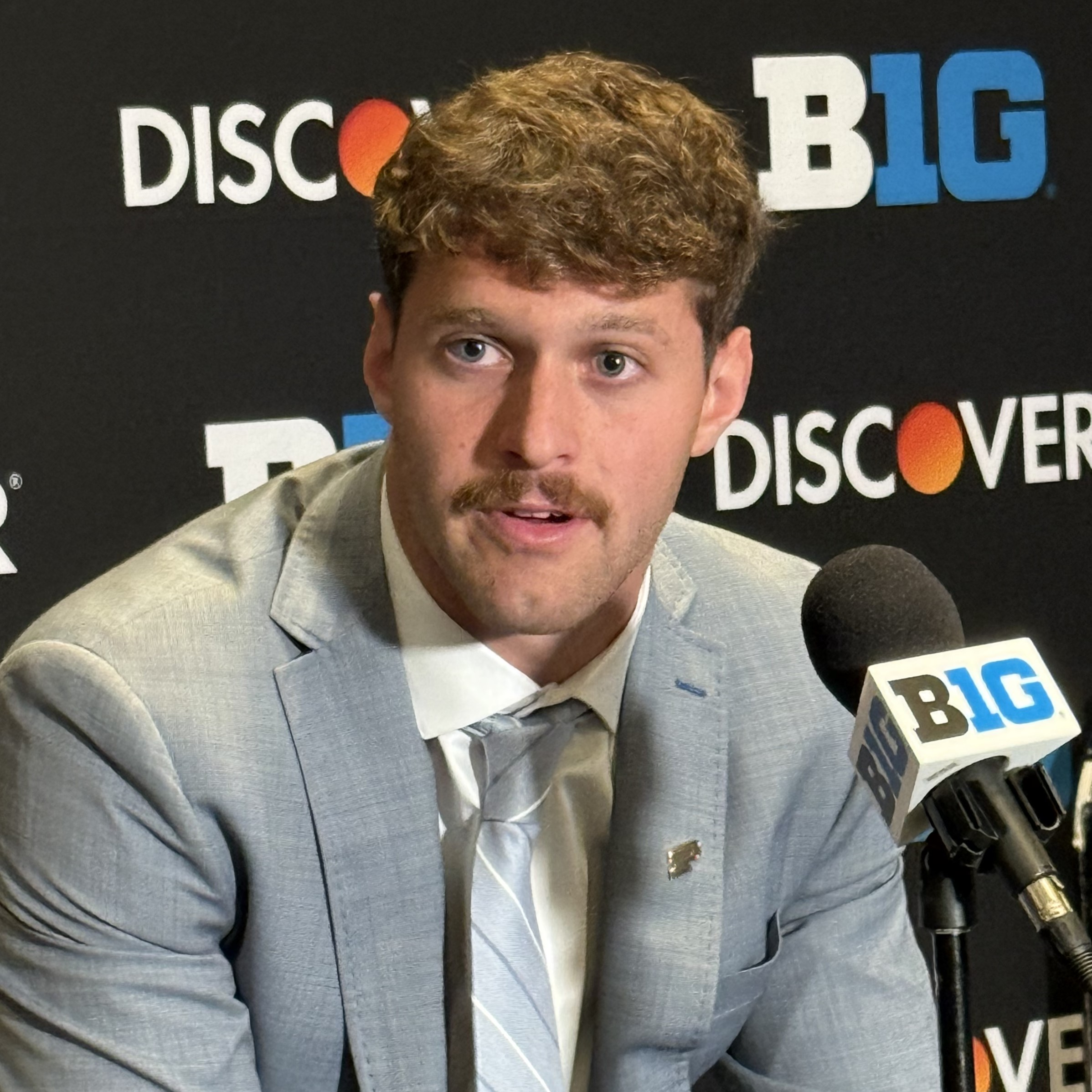
- Browne at 2026 Big Ten Media Day

No. 15 – Purdue Boilermakers
- Position: Quarterback
- Class: Redshirt Junior

Personal information
- Born: August 19, 2003 (age 23); Clarkston, Michigan, U.S.
- Listed height: 6 ft 4 in (1.93 m)
- Listed weight: 220 lb (100 kg)

Career information
- High school: Venice (Venice, Florida); Milford Academy (New Berlin, New York)
- College: Purdue (2023–present)
- Stats at ESPN

Ryan James Browne (born August 19, 2003) is an American college football quarterback for the Purdue Boilermakers.

== Early life ==
Browne was born in Clarkston, Michigan, on August 19, 2003, the son of Jim Browne and Denise Choukourian. Browne began his high school career at Brother Rice High School in Bloomfield Hills, Michigan, where he appeared in one varsity game as a sophomore.

In 2020, his junior season, Browne transferred to Riverview High School in Sarasota, Florida due to the COVID-19 pandemic canceling the high school football season in Michigan. Browne passed for 946 yards and eight touchdowns with just four interceptions; while also rushing for 148 yards and two touchdowns. He led Riverview High School to a third consecutive 8A Region 4 appearance, but lost to Osceola High School.

Browne transferred Venice High School in Venice, Florida. As a senior, he was named the 8A Player of the Year after passing for 2,636 yards and 31 touchdowns while adding 534 yards and eight touchdowns. He committed to Purdue University to play college football. He attended Milford Academy in New Berlin, New York for a year after graduating high school and threw for 2,931 yards and 29 touchdowns.

== College career ==
Browne scrambling during Purdue's game at UCLA in 2026

Browne began his true freshman season in 2023 as the third-string quarterback behind Hudson Card and Bennett Meredith. With Card sidelined by injury, Meredith was named the starter against Northwestern in Week 11, although head coach Ryan Walters said Browne would see significant playing time. Meredith started the game, but Browne received the majority of the snaps and made his collegiate debut, completing 12 of 16 passes for 104 yards with two interceptions and rushing 21 times for 85 yards in the 23–15 loss. He preserved his redshirt by appearing in only one game during the season.

Browne entered the 2024 season as Card's backup, ahead of Meredith and Marcos Davila. After appearing in two of Purdue's first five games, he made his first career start against No. 23 Illinois in Week 6 in place of the injured Card. Browne completed 18 of 26 passes for 297 yards and three touchdowns and rushed for 118 yards on 17 carries in a 50–49 overtime loss. He threw a 13-yard touchdown pass to Devin Mockobee with 46 seconds remaining to give Purdue a 43–40 lead, but Illinois tied the game with a field goal as time expired before winning in overtime. Browne was named the Shaun Alexander Player of the Week and became the second Purdue quarterback since 1970, after Brandon Kirsch, to record at least 250 passing yards and 100 rushing yards in a game. Walters named Browne the starter for the following week's game against No. 2 Oregon, where he completed nine of 19 passes for 93 yards with an interception and rushed for 48 yards in a 35–0 loss. Card returned the following week, and Browne subsequently saw relief action in four additional games. He finished the season having appeared in eight games with two starts, completing 43 of 76 passes for 532 yards, four touchdowns and two interceptions while rushing for 155 yards. Purdue finished the season 1–11, and Walters was fired following the season. Browne entered the transfer portal on December 3, 2024, and committed to North Carolina on December 19. He spent the spring semester under head coach Bill Belichick. On April 16, 2025, Browne re-entered the transfer portal after North Carolina pursued South Alabama quarterback Gio Lopez, who committed to the Tar Heels the following day. Browne committed to return to Purdue on April 18 and transferred back during the spring transfer window. Under new head coach Barry Odom, Browne competed for the starting quarterback position. Odom named him the starter in the final week of fall camp, and Browne was subsequently selected as a team captain.

Browne during Purdue's game against UCLA in 2026

Browne opened the 2025 season with his first career win, a 31–0 victory over Ball State, completing 18 of 26 passes for 311 yards and two touchdowns while adding a rushing touchdown. The following week, he completed 14 of 23 passes for 170 yards, two touchdowns and an interception and added 50 rushing yards in a 34–14 victory over Southern Illinois. Purdue subsequently lost 10 consecutive games and went winless in Big Ten play for the second consecutive season. Browne threw for more than 300 yards in three of the team's first five games, becoming one of four Purdue quarterbacks since 1995 to accomplish the feat in that span, joining Drew Brees, Kyle Orton and Curtis Painter. He started all 12 games, completing 199 of 338 passes for 2,153 yards, nine touchdowns and 10 interceptions while rushing for 206 yards and four touchdowns. He also caught a touchdown pass.

In 2026, Browne returned as the starting quarterback. He opened the season with a 44–19 victory over Indiana State, completing 23 of 29 passes for a career-high 317 yards and three touchdowns. The following week against Wake Forest, he established another career high with 329 passing yards, completing 32 of 42 passes with two touchdowns in a 38–36 double-overtime loss. Against UCLA in Week 3, Browne set another career high with 378 passing yards, completing 19 of 30 passes for three touchdowns and one interception in a 52–38 loss.

=== Statistics ===
Year	Team	Games			Passing								Rushing			
Year	Team	GP	GS	Record	Cmp	Att	Pct	Yds	Y/A	TD	Int	Rtg	Att	Yds	Avg	TD
2023	Purdue	1	0	—	12	16	75.0	104	6.5	0	2	104.6	21	85	4.0	0
2024	Purdue	8	2	0–2	43	76	56.6	532	7.0	4	2	127.5	50	155	3.1	0
2025	Purdue	12	12	2–10	199	338	58.9	2,153	6.4	9	10	115.3	66	206	3.0	4
2026	Purdue	7	7	3–4	145	221	65.6	1,822	8.2	10	3	147.1	40	68	1.7	2
Career		28	21	5–16	399	651	61.3	4,611	7.1	23	17	127.2	177	514	2.9	6

== Personal life ==
Browne is the son of former NFL fullback, Jim Browne.
