= 2026 Kentucky Wildcats football team =

American college football season

2026 Kentucky Wildcats football
- Conference: Southeastern Conference

Ranking
- Coaches: No. 25
- CFP: No. 16
- Record: 7–4 (5–4 SEC)
- Head coach: Will Stein (1st season)
- Offensive coordinator: Joe Sloan (1st season)
- Offensive scheme: Pro spread
- Defensive coordinator: Jay Bateman (1st season)
- Base defense: 4–2–5
- Home stadium: Kroger Field

2026 Southeastern Conference football standings
	Conf.			Overall
Team	W		L	W		L
No. 1 Georgia y	8	–	1	10	–	1
No. 5 Texas	6	–	2	9	–	2
No. 9 Tennessee	6	–	2	9	–	2
No. 3 Alabama	6	–	2	9	–	2
No. 22 Oklahoma	5	–	3	7	–	4
No. 24 Florida	5	–	4	7	–	4
No. 16 Kentucky	5	–	4	7	–	4
No. 25 Ole Miss	4	–	4	7	–	4
Auburn	4	–	4	7	–	4
Missouri	4	–	4	7	–	4
No. 21 South Carolina	4	–	5	6	–	5
LSU	3	–	5	6	–	5
Mississippi State	2	–	6	5	–	6
Arkansas	2	–	6	4	–	7
Texas A&M	1	–	7	4	–	7
Vanderbilt	1	–	7	4	–	7
Championship: Georgia vs TBD
^ – College Football Playoff participant; $ – Conference champion; y – Championship game participant; As of November 22, 2026; Rankings from CFP rankings

The 2026 Kentucky Wildcats football team represents the University of Kentucky in the Southeastern Conference (SEC) during the 2026 NCAA Division I FBS football season. The Wildcats are led by first-year head coach Will Stein. Kentucky plays home games at Kroger Field located in Lexington, Kentucky.

== Offseason ==
=== Staff changes ===
Following the conclusion of the 2025 season, head coach Mark Stoops was relieved of his duties after the Wildcats finished bowl-ineligible for the second consecutive year. Stoops concluded his tenure at Kentucky with an overall record of 82–80, leaving as the winningest head coach in the program's history.

On December 1, 2025, Kentucky athletics director Mitch Barnhart announced the hiring of Oregon offensive coordinator Will Stein as the program's next head coach.

Following the staff transition, defensive line coach Anwar Stewart was the sole assistant retained from the previous regime. Head coach Will Stein's new appointments included offensive coordinator Joe Sloan and defensive coordinator Jay Bateman. The reconstructed coaching staff was notably characterized by its youth, with a majority of the new personnel under the age of 40.

Positions key
Offense	Defense	Special teams
QB — Quarterback; RB — Running back; FB — Fullback; WR — Wide receiver; TE — Tight end; OL — Offensive lineman; T — Tackle; G — Guard; C — Center	DL — Defensive lineman; DT — Defensive tackle (Note: Includes nose tackle (NT)); DE — Defensive end; EDGE — Edge rusher; LB — Linebacker (Note: Includes middle linebacker (MLB/MIKE), weakside linebacker (WILL), strongside linebacker (SAM), off-ball linebacker, and outside linebacker (OLB)); DB — Defensive back; CB — Cornerback; S — Safety (Note: Includes free safety (FS) and strong safety (SS))	K — Kicker (Note: Also known as a placekicker (PK)); P — Punter; LS — Long snapper; RS — Return specialist (Note: Includes kickoff and punt returners)

=== NFL draft ===
On December 17, 2025, guard Jalen Farmer declared for the 2026 NFL draft as an underclassman with one year of eligibility remaining.

The Wildcats had four players selected in the Draft. Guard Jalen Farmer was the first Wildcat off the board, taken in the fourth round by the Indianapolis Colts. He was followed closely by senior center Jager Burton, who was selected 153rd overall by the Green Bay Packers. In the fifth round, the Detroit Lions traded up 13 spots to draft wide receiver Kendrick Law with the 168th overall pick. Running back Seth McGowan concluded the draft class for Kentucky, being reunited with teammate Jalen Farmer after being selected by the Indianapolis Colts in the seventh round.

Round	Pick	Player	Position	NFL team
4	113	Jalen Farmer	G	Indianapolis Colts
5	153	Jager Burton	C	Green Bay Packers
5	168	Kendrick Law	WR	Detroit Lions
7	237	Seth McGowan	RB	Indianapolis Colts

=== Departures ===
2026 Kentucky offseason departures
Name	Pos.	Height	Weight	Year	Hometown	Notes
Jager Burton	C	6'4"	315	Senior	Lexington, KY	Drafted: Round 5, Pick 153 (Green Bay Packers)
Jalen Farmer	G	6'5"	312	Senior	Covington, GA	Drafted: Round 4, Pick 113 (Indianapolis Colts)
Josh Kattus	TE	6'4"	261	Senior	Cincinnati, OH	Signed as undrafted free agent (NFL)
Aidan Laros	P	6'2"	220	Junior	Cape Town, South Africa	Signed as undrafted free agent (NFL)
Kendrick Law	WR	6'0"	201	Senior	Shreveport, LA	Drafted: Round 5, Pick 168 (Detroit Lions)
Ja'Mori Maclin	WR	5'11"	185	Graduate	Kirkwood, MO	Signed as undrafted free agent (NFL)
Seth McGowan	RB	6'0"	220	Senior	Mesquite, TX	Drafted: Round 7, Pick 237 (Indianapolis Colts)
Daveren Rayner	LB	6'2"	215	Graduate	Indianapolis, IN	Signed as undrafted free agent (NFL)

==== Incoming ====
Over the offseason, Kentucky added twenty-nine players from the transfer portal. According to 247Sports, Kentucky had the No. 9 ranked transfer class in the country, as of January 23, 2026.

Incoming transfers
Name	Pos.	Height/weight	Class	Hometown	Prev. school	Sources
Hasaan Sykes	CB	6'0", 185	Jr-Tr	Charlotte, NC	Western Carolina	
Mark Manfred III	CB	6'1", 166	Fr-Tr	St. Louis, MO	Missouri	
Ahmad Breaux	DL	6'3", 278	Jr-Tr	New Orleans, LA	LSU	
Dominic Wiseman	DL	6'2", 300	Sr-Tr	Mobile, AL	South Alabama	
Jamarrion Harkless	DL	6'3", 345	Jr-Tr	Indianapolis, IN	Purdue	
Antonio O'Berry	EDGE	6'6", 240	Gr-Tr	Charlotte, NC	Gardner-Webb	
Tyler Thomas	EDGE	6'5", 259			South Alabama	
Coleton Price	IOL	6'3", 318	Sr-Tr	Round Rock, TX	Baylor	
Max Anderson	IOL	6'5", 311	So-Tr	Nashville, TN	Tennessee	
Tegra Tshabola	IOL	6'6", 322	Sr-Tr	West Chester, OH	Ohio State	
Adam Zouagui	K	5'11", 188	Sr-Tr	Tampa, FL	South Florida	
Elijah Barnes	LB	6'1", 244		Dallas, TX	Texas	
Tavion Wallace	LB	6'1", 239	So-Tr	Little Rock, AR	Arkansas	
Lance Heard	OT	6'6", 330	Sr-Tr	Nashville, TN	Tennessee	
Mark Robinson	OT	6'5", 320	Jr-Tr	El Paso, TX	UTEP	
Olaus Alinen	OT	6'6", 322	So-Tr	Helsinki Finland	Alabama	
JacQai Long	QB	6'2", 205	So-Tr	Atlanta, GA	Marshall	
Kenny Minchey	QB	6'2", 208	Jr-Tr	Hendersonville, TN	Notre Dame	
CJ Baxter	RB	6'1", 227		Orlando, FL	Texas	
Jovantae Barnes	RB	6'0", 211	Sr-Tr	Las Vegas, NV	Oklahoma	
Aaron Gates	S	6'0", 198	Jr-Tr	Fort Lauderdale, FL	Florida	
Cyrus Reyes	S	6'1", 200	Jr-Tr	Miami, FL	Mississippi State	
Jesse Anderson	S	6'0", 185	Jr-Tr	Pittsburgh, PA	Pittsburgh	
Jordan Castell	S	6'2", 213	Sr-Tr	West Palm Beach, FL	Florida	
Brock Coffman	WR	6'0", 180	Fr-Tr	Lexington, KY	Louisville	
Ja'Kayden Ferguson	WR	6'2", 187		Houston, TX	Arkansas	
Nic Anderson	WR	6'4", 208	Sr-Tr		LSU	
Shane Carr	WR	6'2", 190	Sr-Tr		Southern Utah	
Xavier Daisy	WR	6'3", 210	Jr-Tr	Mobile, AL	UAB	

== Roster ==
2026 Kentucky Wildcats football team roster
Players
Coaches
Offense

Pos.	#	Name	Class
RB	0	Martels Carter Jr.	So
RB	1	CJ Baxter	Sr
RB	2	Jovantae Barnes	GS
QB	3	Kenny Minchey	Sr
WR	4	Nic Anderson	GS
WR	5	Ja'Kayden Ferguson	So
WR	6	Shane Carr	Sr
WR	7	DJ Miller	So
TE	8	Mikkel Skinner	So
QB	9	Matt Ponatoski	Fr
QB	10	Callum Wither	GS
TE	11	Lincoln Watkins	Fr
WR	12	Brock Coffman	So
WR	13	Denairius Gray	Fr
QB	14	Brennen Ward	So
QB	15	Carson Cruver	Sr
QB	16	JacQai Long	Jr
QB	17	William Drakeford Jr.	Fr
WR	18	Xavier Daisy	Jr
WR	19	Kenny Darby	Fr
RB	21	Tovani Mizell	Jr
RB	22	Delvecchio Alston II	Fr
RB	26	Jason Patterson	Jr
RB	28	Ahmir Smith	Jr
RB	29	Jordan Colbert	Jr
WR	33	Rico Crowder	Jr
RB	34	Isaiah Jackson	Fr
WR	37	Spencer Leadbetter	Sr
WR	39	Saxton Howard	So
TE	44	Justin Kattus	Jr
OL	52	Cameron Miller Jr.	Fr
OL	53	Lance Heard	Sr
OL	55	Aba Selm	Jr
OL	57	Jordan Knox	Sr
OL	60	Mason Howard	Fr
OL	61	Jason Ekperuoh	So
OL	62	Ben Myers	Fr
OL	64	Ryan Meeker	Fr
OL	66	Tino Merlo	Sr
OL	67	Mark Robinson	Jr
OL	68	Alexander DiMartino	So
OL	69	Hank Timon	Fr
OL	70	Rob Fogler	Sr
OL	71	Malachi Wood	Sr
OL	72	Coleton Price	GS
OL	73	Olaus Alinen	Sr
OL	74	Jermiel Atkins Jr.	So
OL	75	Hayes Johnson	Jr
OL	77	Tegra Tshabola	GS
OL	78	Cameron Jones	Sr
OL	79	Jay Clark	So
WR	80	Ashton Cozart	Sr
TE	81	Willie Rodriguez	Jr
TE	82	Nelson Tambling	Fr
WR	83	Prince Jean	Fr
WR	84	Davis McCray	Fr
TE	85	Elijah Brown	GS
TE	87	Henry Boyer	GS
OL	89	Max Anderson	Jr
WR	89	Cash Harney	Fr

Defense

Pos.	#	Name	Class
LB	0	Elijah "Bo" Barnes	So
DB	1	Andre Clarke Jr.	Fr
OLB	2	Sam Greene	Sr
DB	3	Aaron Gates	Sr
MLB	4	Antwan Smith	Jr
DB	5	Jordan Castell	Sr
DT	6	Ahmad Breaux	Jr
DL	7	Jamarrion Harkless	Sr
OLB	8	Lorenzo Cowan	Jr
LB	9	Alex Afari Jr.	GS
DB	10	Dyllon Williams	So
DB	11	Braxton Urquhart	Sr
DB	12	Hasaan Sykes	Jr
DB	13	Cyrus Reyes	Jr
DB	14	Ty Bryant	Sr
OLB	15	Cedric "CJ" Works	So
DB	16	Jesse Anderson III	Sr
MLB	17	Justyn Hartley	Fr
DB	18	Mark Manfred III	So
DB	19	Kevis Thomas	Sr
DB	20	Terhyon Nichols	Jr
DB	21	Nasir Addison	Sr
MLB	22	Grant Godfrey	Sr
DL	23	Brian Robinson	Jr
DB	24	Jaden Smith	So
MLB	25	Tavion Wallace	So
DB	26	Andrew Purcell	So
DB	27	Isaiah McMillian	Fr
DB	28	Demarcus Gardner	So
DB	30	Grant Grayton	So
MLB	31	Quintavion Norman	Jr
MLB	32	Devin Smith	Jr
S	33	Sam Brown III	Fr
DB	36	Andrew Weber	Jr
DB	38	Tyler Wright	Fr
OLB	53	Ben Reeves	Jr
DL	90	Mi'Quise Humphrey-Grace	GS
DL	91	Jaden Williams	GS
DE	92	Ben Duncum	Fr
DL	93	Kalen Edwards	So
DL	94	Tavion Gadson	Sr
DT	96	Dominic Wiseman	GS
DE	97	Tyler Thomas	Sr

Special teams

Pos.	#	Name	Class
K	35	Matthew Obermeier	Fr
LS	40	Cole Marszalek	Sr
LS	47	Spencer Radnoti	Jr
P	48	Thomas O'Hara	Sr
LS	59	Jack Wheeler	Fr
K	88	Adam Zouagui	Sr
K	91	Jacob Kauwe	Jr
P	93	Wilson Berry	GS

Head coach

- Will Stein

Coordinators/assistant coaches

- Pete Nochta – General Manager
- Alex Brown – Assistant General Manager
- Jay Bateman – Defensive Coordinator
- Joe Sloan – Offensive Coordinator
- Allen Brown – Cornerbacks
- Justin Burke – Tight Ends
- Josh Christian-Young – Safeties
- Cutter Leftwich – Offensive Line
- Joe Price III – Wide Receivers
- Kolby Smith – Running Backs
- Anwar Stewart – Defensive Line
- Tony Washington Jr. – Edges/Outside Linebackers Coach
- Andrew Coverdale – Passing Game Coordinator
- Nate Dodson – Quarterbacks Coach
- Parker Fleming – Special Teams Coordinator/Inside Wide Receivers Coach
- James Gibson – Stars Coach
- Ty Holder – Assistant Cornerbacks Coach
- Adam Kleffner – Offensive Line Analyst
- Trey Odom – Assistant Safeties Coach
- Jack Ray – Assistant Special Teams Coordinator
- Dillon Sanders – Inside Linebackers
- Tommy Shuler – Assistant Wide Receivers Coach
- Rob Snyder – Assistant Defensive Line
- Keith Towbridge – Assistant Running Backs Coach
- Dallas Warmack – Assistant Offensive Line Coach
- Eli Wicklund – Defensive Analyst
- Brandon Roberts – Director of Football Sports Performance
- Quinn Barham – Assistant Strength and Performance Coach
- Joe Miday – Assistant Strength and Performance Coach
- Shayon Guest – Assistant Strength and Performance Coach
- Joe Powell – Assistant Strength and Performance Coach
- Chris Morris – Director of Performance Science
- Leah Barnard – Assistant Director of Recruiting
- Tori Bonno – Performance Dietitian
- Evan Griskowitz – Director of Sports Medicine
- Devin Harris – Director of Football Performance Nutrition
- Tom Kalinowski – Equipment Manager
- Jocelyn Grimsley – On-Campus Recruiting Assistant
- Courtney Love – Director of Player Development
- Erynn Love – Director of Recruiting
- Jerret McElwain – Director of Player Personnel
- Mark Perry – Offensive Assistant/NFL Liaison/Director of High School Relations
- Josh Pruitt – Director of Operations
- Christian Fiero – Director of Coaching Video
- Allen (Tink) Belcher – Athletic Equipment Coordinator
- Brinkley Berch – Assistant Director of Operations
- Chatham Boyer – Academic Football Counselor
- Lauren Cooley – Athletic Training Fellow
- Misty Conrad – Student-Athlete Medical Billing Specialist
- Jacob Noger – Creative Coordinator
- Bailey Gallt – Assistant Creative Director
- Stephen Gillette – Assistant Director of Scouting & Analytics
- Amit Gohil – Director of Return to Play
- John (Hova) Herron – Acquisition Coordinator
- Carson Hickman – Senior Personnel/Recruiting Analyst
- Walt Hill – Coaching Video Assistant
- Justus LePrevost – Athletic Training Fellow
- Alex Logwood – Senior Athletic Trainer
- Heather McAtee – Assistant AD for Academics & Eligibility
- Julia Odell – Athletic Training Fellow
- Jon Ross – Academic Football Counselor
- Melissa Tomlinson – Executive Administrative Assistant
- Grace Tortorice – Sports Science Coordinator
- Brytun Walker – Assistant Athletic Trainer
- Yusuf Corker – Graduate Assistant/Defense
- Blake Micek – Graduate Assistant/Recruiting
- Paul Rodriguez – Graduate Assistant/Offensive Line
- Brandon Schnapp – Graduate Assistant / Offense
- Jervontius “Bunchy” Stallings – Graduate Assistant/Defense

Legend

- (C) Team captain
- (S) Suspended
- (I) Ineligible
- Injured
- Redshirt

Roster

== Schedule ==
Date	Time	Opponent	Rank	Site	TV	Result	Attendance
September 5	1:00 p.m.	No. 9 (FCS) Youngstown State*		Kroger Field; Lexington, KY	SECN+	W 45–13	60,166
September 12	3:30 p.m.	No. 12 Alabama		Kroger Field; Lexington, KY (SEC Nation)	ABC	L 17–45	61,820
September 19	3:30 p.m.	at No. 9 Texas A&M		Kyle Field; College Station, TX	ESPN	W 31–21	105,186
September 26	12:45 p.m.	South Alabama*		Kroger Field; Lexington, KY	SECN	W 45–21	61,127
October 3	4:15 p.m.	at South Carolina	No. 24	Williams–Brice Stadium; Columbia, SC	SECN	W 35–34 ^{OT}	77,808
October 10	7:00 p.m.	No. 10 LSU		Kroger Field; Lexington, KY	ESPN	W 35–34 ^{OT}	61,897
October 17	7:30 p.m.	at Oklahoma	No. 15	Gaylord Family Oklahoma Memorial Stadium; Norman, OK	SECN	W 21–13	83,218
October 24	7:30 p.m.	Vanderbilt	No. 12	Kroger Field; Lexington, KY (rivalry)	SECN	W 34–17	61,843
November 7	6:15 p.m.	at No. 13 Tennessee	No. 6	Neyland Stadium; Knoxville, TN (rivalry)	ESPN	L 6–34	101,915
November 14	6:15 p.m.	Florida	No. 11	Kroger Field; Lexington, KY (rivalry)	ESPN	L 14–21	61,866
November 21	7:30 p.m.	at Missouri	No. 16	Faurot Field; Columbia, MO	SECN	L 14–28	63,609
November 28	12:00 p.m.	Louisville*		Kroger Field; Lexington, KY (Governor's Cup)	ESPN2		
*Non-conference game; Rankings from AP Poll (and CFP Rankings, after November 3) – Released prior to game; All times are in Eastern time

== Rankings ==
Ranking movements Legend: ██ Increase in ranking ██ Decrease in ranking — = Not ranked RV = Received votes
	Week															
Poll	Pre	1	2	3	4	5	6	7	8	9	10	11	12	13	14	Final
AP	—	—	—	RV	24	RV	15	12	9	8	13	17	RV			
Coaches	—	—	—	RV	RV	25	17	12	8	7	13	18	25			
CFP	Not released									6	11	16				Not released

== Game summaries ==
=== vs No. 9 (FCS) Youngstown State ===
No. 9 (FCS) Youngstown State Penguins (1–0) at Kentucky Wildcats (0–0) – Game summary

Quarter	1	2	3	4	Total
No. 9 (FCS) Penguins	0	7	6	0	13
Wildcats	14	14	7	10	45

at Kroger Field, Lexington, KY

- Date: September 5
- Game time: 1:00 p.m. EDT
- Game weather: Sunny • Temperature: 87 °F (31 °C) • Wind: SE at 5 mph (8.0 km/h)
- Game attendance: 60,166
- Referee: Kyle Olson
- TV announcers (SECN+/ESPN+): Kevin Fitzgerald and Charlie Strong

Game information
First quarter
- (11:29) UK – CJ Baxter 15-yard run, Adam Zouagui kick (Drive: 7 plays, 75 yards, 3:31; Kentucky 7–0)
- (6:25) UK – CJ Baxter 5-yard run, Adam Zouagui kick (Drive: 7 plays, 60 yards, 3:35; Kentucky 14–0)

Second quarter

- (11:30) UK – Mikkel Skinner 10-yard pass from Kenny Minchey, Adam Zouagui kick (Drive: 7 plays, 59 yards, 4:02; Kentucky 21–0)
- (1:51) UK – Willie Rodriguez 2-yard pass from Kenny Minchey, Adam Zouagui kick (Drive: 5 plays, 28 yards, 2:10; Kentucky 28–0)
- (0:20) YSU – Lynn Wyche-El 6-yard pass from Beau Brungard, Andrew Lastovka kick (Drive: 12 plays, 75 yards, 1:31; Kentucky 28–7)

Third quarter

- (8:19) UK – Prince Jean 26-yard pass from Kenny Minchey, Adam Zouagui kick (Drive: 9 plays, 75 yards, 3:25; Kentucky 35–7)
- (3:41) YSU – Jaden Gilbert 9-yard run, Andrew Lastovka kick failed (Drive: 9 plays, 75 yards, 4:38; Kentucky 35–13)

Fourth quarter

- (12:48) UK – Kenny Darby 37-yard pass from Kenny Minchey, Adam Zouagui kick (Drive: 3 plays, 60 yards, 1:13; Kentucky 42–13)
- (5:29) UK – Adam Zouagui 28-yard field goal (Drive: 11 plays, 66 yards, 5:19; Kentucky 45–13)

Statistics	YSU	UK
First downs	20	24
Plays–yards	66–305	61–506
Rushes–yards	28–59	34–205
Passing yards	246	301
Passing: comp–att–int	24–38–0	18–27–0
Turnovers	1	0
Time of possession	30:08	29:52

Team	Category	Player	Statistics
Youngstown State	Passing	Beau Brungard	23/25, 243 yards, TD
Youngstown State	Rushing	Beau Brungard	12 carries, 29 yards
Youngstown State	Receiving	Lynn Wyche-El	7 receptions, 111 yards, TD
Kentucky	Passing	Kenny Minchey	18/27, 301 yards, 4 TD
Kentucky	Rushing	Jason Patterson	11 carries, 78 yards
Kentucky	Receiving	Kenny Darby	3 receptions, 74 yards, TD

=== vs No. 12 Alabama ===
No. 12 Alabama Crimson Tide (1–0) at Kentucky Wildcats (1–0) – Game summary

Quarter	1	2	3	4	Total
No. 12 Crimson Tide	7	6	18	14	45
Wildcats	7	10	0	0	17

at Kroger Field • Lexington, Kentucky

- Date: September 12
- Game time: 3:30 p.m. EDT
- Game weather: Cloudy • Temperature: 78 °F (26 °C) • Wind: S at 8 miles per hour (13 km/h)
- Game attendance: 61,820
- Referee: Ted Pitts
- TV announcers (ABC): Sean McDonough, Greg McElroy and Katie George

Game information

First quarter

- UK – Mi'Quise Humphrey-Grace 2-yard interception return (Adam Zouagui kick), 10:11. Wildcats 7–0.
- ALA – Luke Metz 34-yard interception return (Conor Talty kick), 6:35. Tied 7–7.

Second quarter

- UK – Henry Boyer 20-yard pass from Kenny Minchey (Adam Zouagui kick), 14:56. Wildcats 14–7. Drive: 13 plays, 83 yards, 6:33.
- ALA – Conor Talty 25-yard field goal, 9:27. Wildcats 14–10. Drive: 10 plays, 68 yards, 5:29.
- ALA – Conor Talty 41-yard field goal, 2:09. Wildcats 14–13. Drive: 8 plays, 44 yards, 4:13.
- UK – Adam Zouagui 39-yard field goal, 0:00. Wildcats 17–13. Drive: 9 plays, 33 yards, 0:55.

Third quarter

- ALA – Conor Talty 34-yard field goal, 7:10. Wildcats 17–16. Drive: 9 plays, 43 yards, 3:48.
- ALA – EJ Crowell 3-yard run (Conor Talty kick), 3:00. Crimson Tide 23–17. Drive: 5 plays, 21 yards, 2:42.
- ALA – Daniel Hill 3-yard run (Keelon Russell–Lotzeir Brooks pass), 0:24. Crimson Tide 31–17. Drive: 2 plays, 34 yards, 0:25.

Fourth quarter

- ALA – Rico Scott 5-yard pass from Keelon Russell (Conor Talty kick), 9:08. Crimson Tide 38–17. Drive: 9 plays, 74 yards, 5:03.
- ALA – Trae'shawn Brown 4-yard run (Conor Talty kick), 4:11. Crimson Tide 45–17. Drive: 5 plays, 43 yards, 2:54.

Statistics	ALA	UK
First downs	21	14
Plays–yards	63–343	64–209
Rushes–yards	40–155	32–63
Passing yards	188	146
Passing: comp–att–int	16–23–2	18–32–1
Turnovers	3	3
Time of possession	32:14	27:46

Team	Category	Player	Statistics
Alabama	Passing	Keelon Russell	16/23, 188 yards, TD, 2 INT
Alabama	Rushing	Daniel Hill	18 carries, 104 yards, TD
Alabama	Receiving	Lotzeir Brooks	5 receptions, 54 yards
Kentucky	Passing	Kenny Minchey	18/31, 146 yards, TD, INT
Kentucky	Rushing	Jason Patterson	11 carries, 53 yards
Kentucky	Receiving	Willie Rodriguez	8 receptions, 49 yards

=== at No. 9 Texas A&M ===
Kentucky Wildcats (1–1) at No. 9 Texas A&M Aggies (2–0) – Game summary

Quarter	1	2	3	4	Total
Wildcats	0	7	21	3	31
No. 9 Aggies	0	7	0	14	21

at Kyle Field • College Station, TX

- Date: September 19
- Game time: 3:30 p.m. EDT
- Game weather: Sunny • Temperature: 96 °F (36 °C) • Wind: N at 5 miles per hour (8.0 km/h)
- Game attendance: 105,186
- Referee: James Carter
- TV announcers (ESPN): Joe Tessitore, Jesse Palmer and Kris Budden

Game information

First quarter

- No scoring plays

Second quarter

- TA&M - Carsyn Baker 5-yard run (David Olano kick), 5:18. Aggies 7–0. Drive: 14 plays, 79 yards, 7:02.
- UK - Henry Boyer 3-yard pass from Kenny Minchey (Adam Zouagui kick), 1:59. Tied 7–7. Drive: 6 plays, 75 yards, 3:11.

Third quarter

- UK - Kenny Darby 42-yard pass from Kenny Minchey (Adam Zouagui kick), 11:07. 14–7 Kentucky. Drive: 7 plays, 75 yards, 3:53.
- UK - CJ Baxter 3-yard run (Adam Zouagui kick), 3:55. 21–7 Kentucky. Drive: 9 plays, 83 yards, 5:24.
- UK - CJ Baxter 2-yard run (Adam Zouagui kick), 0:16. 28–7 Kentucky. Drive: 4 plays, 33 yards, 2:01.

Fourth quarter

- TA&M - Marcel Reed 5-yard run (David Olano kick), 11:37. 28–14 Kentucky. Drive: 13 plays, 75 yards, 3:39.
- UK - Adam Zouagui 52-yard field goal, 8:22. 31–14 Kentucky. Drive: 6 plays, 41 yards, 3:15.
- TA&M - Micah Riley 5-yard pass from Marcel Reed (David Olano kick), 3:45. 31–21 Kentucky. Drive: 7 plays, 38 yards, 1:49.

Statistics	UK	TAMU
First downs	18	23
Plays–yards	54–408	84–423
Rushes–yards	36–255	35–187
Passing yards	252	236
Passing: comp–att–int	14–18–0	26–49–2
Turnovers	0	2
Time of possession	29:35	30:25

Team	Category	Player	Statistics
Kentucky	Passing	Kenny Minchey	14/18, 252 yards, 2 TD
Kentucky	Rushing	CJ Baxter	19 carries, 87 yards, 2 TD
Kentucky	Receiving	DJ Miller	5 receptions, 96 yards
Texas A&M	Passing	Marcel Reed	26/49, 236 yards, TD, INT
Texas A&M	Rushing	Marcel Reed	10 carries, 80 yards, TD
Texas A&M	Receiving	Mario Craver	11 receptions, 119 yards

=== vs South Alabama ===
South Alabama Jaguars (2–1) at Kentucky Wildcats (2–1) – Game summary

Quarter	1	2	3	4	Total
Jaguars	0	21	0	0	21
Wildcats	7	17	7	14	45

at Kroger Field • Lexington, Kentucky

- Date: September 26
- Game time: 12:45 p.m. EDT
- Game weather: Sunny • Temperature: 72 °F (22 °C) • Wind: NE at 8 miles per hour (13 km/h)
- Game attendance: 61,227
- Referee: Jeff Heaser
- TV announcers (SECN): Dave Neal, Cole Cubelic and Tori Petry

Game information

First quarter

- (0:37) UK – CJ Baxter 3-yard run, Adam Zouagui kick (Drive: 10 plays, 73 yards, 5:44; Kentucky 7–0)

Second quarter

- (14:17) USA – PJ Martin 7-yard run, Davis Little kick (Drive: 3 plays, 15 yards, 0:27; Tied 7–7)
- (10:14) USA – Anthony Eager 36-yard pass from Jared Hollins, Davis Little kick (Drive: 3 plays, 57 yards, 1:05; South Alabama 14–7)
- (4:57) UK – Jovantae Barnes 7-yard run, Adam Zouagui kick (Drive: 11 plays, 76 yards, 5:11; Tied 14–14)
- (1:22) USA – Jeremiah Jones-Thomas 19-yard pass from Jared Hollins, Davis Little kick (Drive: 9 plays, 75 yards, 3:35; South Alabama 21–14)
- (1:12) UK – Jason Patterson 75-yard run, Adam Zouagui kick (Drive: 1 play, 75 yards, 0:10; Tied 21–21)
- (0:16) UK – Adam Zouagui 34-yard field goal (Drive: 4 plays, 5 yards, 0:49; Kentucky 24–21)

Third quarter

- (13:13) UK – Jason Patterson 15-yard run, Adam Zouagui kick (Drive: 4 plays, 75 yards, 1:47; Kentucky 31–21)

Fourth quarter

- (12:55) UK – Jason Patterson 2-yard run, Adam Zouagui kick (Drive: 6 plays, 69 yards, 3:12; Kentucky 38–21)
- (10:45) UK – Shane Carr 15-yard pass from Kenny Minchey, Adam Zouagui kick (Drive: 3 plays, 33 yards, 1:09; Kentucky 45–21)

Statistics	USA	UK
First downs	19	26
Plays–yards	74–354	68–567
Rushes–yards	31–88	42–390
Passing yards	266	177
Passing: comp–att–int	23–43–2	19–26–0
Turnovers	2	2
Time of possession	28:19	31:41

Team	Category	Player	Statistics
South Alabama	Passing	Jared Hollins	23/43, 266 yards, 2 TD, 2 INT
South Alabama	Rushing	PJ Martin	9 carries, 48 yards, TD
South Alabama	Receiving	Jeremiah Jones-Thomas	6 receptions, 91 yards, TD
Kentucky	Passing	Kenny Minchey	19/25, 177 yards, TD
Kentucky	Rushing	CJ Baxter	16 carries, 149 yards, TD
Kentucky	Receiving	Kenny Darby	3 receptions, 43 yards

=== at South Carolina ===
No. 24 Kentucky Wildcats (3–1) at South Carolina Gamecocks (2–2) – Game summary

Quarter	1	2	3	4	OT	Total
No. 24 Wildcats	0	10	14	3	8	35
Gamecocks	14	6	0	7	7	34

at Williams–Brice Stadium • Columbia, South Carolina

- Date: October 3
- Game time: 4:15 p.m. EDT
- Game weather: Cloudy • Temperature: 79 °F (26 °C)
- Game attendance: 77,808
- Referee: David Smith
- TV announcers (SECN): Taylor Zarzour, Matt Stinchcomb, and Michella Chester

Game information

First quarter

- (11:00) SC - Matt Fuller 6-yard run (Malik Orsan kick) (Drive: 10 plays, 75 yards, 4:00)
- (2:09) SC - Jabree Coleman 4-yard run (Malik Orsan kick) (Drive: 5 plays, 66 yards, 1:59)

Second quarter

- (11:02) SC - Malik Orsan 29-yard field goal (Drive: 11 plays, 47 yards, 4:39)
- (2:47) UK - CJ Baxter 3-yard run (Adam Zouagui kick) (Drive: 5 plays, 33 yards, 2:17)
- (0:59) UK - Adam Zouagui 42-yard field goal (Drive: 7 plays, 50 yards, 1:19)
- (0:00) SC - Malik Orsan 48-yard field goal (Drive: 6 plays, 45 yards, 0:59)

Third quarter

- (11:59) UK - Kenny Darby 17-yard pass from Kenny Minchey (Adam Zouagui kick) (Drive: 7 plays, 75 yards, 2:59)
- (0:40) UK - Nic Anderson 32-yard pass from Kenny Minchey (Adam Zouagui kick) (Drive: 5 plays, 51 yards, 2:34)

Fourth quarter

- (13:14) SC - DJ Black 15-yard pass from LaNorris Sellers (Malik Orsan kick) (Drive: 5 plays, 75 yards, 2:26)
- (4:13) UK - Adam Zouagui 29-yard field goal (Drive: 10 plays, 66 yard, 5:23)

Overtime

- SC - Maurice Brown II 5-yard pass from LaNorris Sellers (Malik Orsan kick) (Drive: 6 plays, 25 yards)
- UK - Henry Boyer 6-yard pass from Kenny Minchey (Kenny Minchey pass to Willie Rodriguez for Two-Point Conversion) (Drive: 4 plays, 25 yards)

Statistics	UK	SC
First downs	25	21
Plays–yards	78–394	74–458
Rushes–yards	37–122	37–232
Passing yards	272	226
Passing: comp–att–int	28–41–0	20–37–0
Turnovers	0	2
Time of possession	33:29	26:31

Team	Category	Player	Statistics
Kentucky	Passing	Kenny Minchey	28/41, 272 yards, 3 TD
Kentucky	Rushing	CJ Baxter	13 carries, 48 yards, TD
Kentucky	Receiving	Kenny Darby	12 receptions, 96 yards, TD
South Carolina	Passing	LaNorris Sellers	20/36, 226 yards, 2 TD
South Carolina	Rushing	LaNorris Sellers	17 carries, 147 yards
South Carolina	Receiving	Mazeo Bennett Jr.	8 receptions, 92 yards

=== vs No. 10 LSU ===
No. 10 LSU Tigers (4–1) at Kentucky Wildcats (4–1) – Game summary

Quarter	1	2	3	4	OT	Total
No. 10 Tigers	10	7	3	7	7	34
Wildcats	7	14	0	6	8	35

at Kroger Field • Lexington, Kentucky

- Date: October 10
- Game time: 7:00 p.m. EDT
- Game weather: Cloudy
- Game attendance: 61,897
- TV announcers (ESPN): Wes Durham, Dusty Dvoracek, and Taylor McGregor

Game information

First quarter

- (8:45) - LSU - Scott Starzyk 24-yard field goal (Drive: 14 plays, 69 yards, 6:15); LSU 3-0
- (8:09) - UK - CJ Baxter 3-yard run (Adam Zouagui kick) (Drive: 2 plays, 80 yards, 0:30); Kentucky 7-3
- (1:39) - LSU - Zach Grace 22-yard pass from Sam Leavitt (Scott Starzyk kick) (Drive: 11 plays, 75 yards, 6:30); LSU 10-7

Second quarter

- (13:06) - UK - Brock Coffman 55-yard punt return (Adam Zouagui kick) (Drive: 3 plays, 2 yards, 0:57); Kentucky 14-10
- (6:11) - LSU - Jackson Harris 10-yard pass from Sam Leavitt (Scott Starzyk kick) (Drive: 14 plays, 65 yards, 6:54); LSU 17-14
- (0:03) - UK - Kenny Minchey 1-yard run (Adam Zouagui kick) (Drive: 15 plays, 75 yards, 6:11); Kentucky 21-17

Third quarter

- (2:13) - LSU - Scott Starzyk 24-yard field goal (Drive: 11 plays, 73 yards, 4:33); Kentucky 21-20

Fourth quarter

- (11:54) - UK - Adam Zouagui 28-yard field goal (Drive: 10 plays, 65 yards, 5:19); Kentucky 24-20
- (9:42) - LSU - Roman Mothershed 41-yard pass from Jackson Harris (Scott Starzyk kick) (Drive: 6 plays, 75 yards, 2:12); LSU 27-24
- (0:12) - UK - Adam Zouagui 33-yard field goal (Drive: 9 plays, 63 yards, 1:25); Tied 27-27

Overtime

- LSU - Sam Leavitt 15-yard run (Scott Starzyk kick) (Drive: 2 plays, 25 yards); LSU 34-27
- UK - CJ Baxter 1-yard run (Kenny Minchey Two-Point Conversion Run) (Drive: 5 plays, 25 yards); Kentucky 35-34

Statistics	LSU	UK
First downs	26	19
Plays–yards	71-410	68-401
Rushes–yards	36-94	32-155
Passing yards	316	246
Passing: comp–att–int	26-35-1	23-36-0
Turnovers	2	0
Time of possession	32:30	27:30

Team	Category	Player	Statistics
LSU	Passing	Sam Leavitt	25/34, 275 yards, 2 TD, 1 INT
LSU	Rushing	Dilin Jones	16 carries, 56 yards
LSU	Receiving	Dilin Jones	7 receptions, 84 yards
Kentucky	Passing	Kenny Minchey	23/36, 246 yards
Kentucky	Rushing	C.J. Baxter	19 carries, 123 yards, 2 TD
Kentucky	Receiving	Kenny Darby	4 receptions, 79 yards

Kentucky becomes the first team in FBS history to win consecutive overtime games by one point since overtime was introduced in 1996.

=== at Oklahoma ===
No. 15 Kentucky Wildcats (5–1) at Oklahoma Sooners (3–2) – Game summary

Quarter	1	2	3	4	Total
No. 15 Wildcats	7	0	0	14	21
Sooners	3	7	3	0	13

at Gaylord Family Oklahoma Memorial Stadium • Norman, Oklahoma

- Date: October 17
- Game time: 6:30 p.m. CT
- Game weather: Sunny • Temperature: 58 °F (14 °C) • Wind: N at 3 miles per hour (4.8 km/h)
- Game attendance: 83,218
- Referee: Jason Autrey
- TV announcers (SECN): Dave Neal, Cole Cubelic, and Tori Petry

Game information

First quarter

- (8:36) - UK - Willie Rodriguez 2-yard pass from Kenny Minchey (Adam Zouagui kick) (Drive: 13 plays, 67 yards, 6:20); Wildcats 7-0
- (1:33) - OU - Tate Sandell 44-yard field goal (Drive: 13 plays, 49 yards, 7:03); Wildcats 7-3

Second quarter

- (0:30) - OU - Rocky Beers 20-yard pass from John Mateer (Tate Sandell kick) (Drive: 12 plays, 90 yards, 3:54); Sooners 10-7

Third quarter

- (6:32) - OU - Tate Sandell 26-yard field goal (Drive: 10 plays, 66 yards, 4:25); Sooners 13-7

Fourth quarter

- (12:53) - UK - Willie Rodriguez 12-yard pass from Kenny Minchey (Adam Zouagui kick) (Drive: 8 plays, 44 yards, 2:42); Wildcats 14-13
- (1:17) - UK - Jordan Castell 41-yard interception return (Adam Zouagui kick) (Drive: 6 plays, 28 yards, 1:26); Wildcats 21-13

Statistics	UK	OU
First downs	14	19
Plays–yards	54-230	76-346
Rushes–yards	26-72	31-76
Passing yards	158	270
Passing: comp–att–int	21-28-0	24-41-4
Turnovers	0	4
Time of possession	28:36	31:24

Team	Category	Player	Statistics
Kentucky	Passing	Kenny Minchey	21/28, 158 yards, 2 TD
Kentucky	Rushing	Jason Patterson	12 carries, 38 yards
Kentucky	Receiving	Nic Anderson	5 receptions, 48 yards
Oklahoma	Passing	John Mateer	24/40, 270 yards, 1 TD, 3 INT
Oklahoma	Rushing	Lloyd Avant	8 carries, 31 yards
Oklahoma	Receiving	Isaiah Sategna III	8 receptions, 83 yards

=== vs Vanderbilt (rivalry) ===
Vanderbilt Commodores (3–4) at No. 12 Kentucky Wildcats (6–1) – Game summary

Quarter	1	2	3	4	Total
Commodores	3	7	7	0	17
No. 12 Wildcats	0	14	10	10	34

at Kroger Field • Lexington, Kentucky

- Date: October 24
- Game time: 7:30 p.m. EDT
- Game weather: Clear • Temperature: 64 °F (18 °C) • Wind: E at 5 miles per hour (8.0 km/h)
- Game attendance: 61,843
- Referee: Jeff Heaser
- TV announcers (SECN): Matt Schumacker, Aaron Murray, and Taylor Davis

Game information

First quarter

- (3:57) VAN - Brock Taylor 30-yard field goal (Drive: 4 plays, 8 yards, 2:12); Commodores 3-0

Second quarter

- (9:03) VAN - Jayvontay Conner 3-yard pass from Jared Curtis (Brock Taylor kick) (Drive: 16 plays, 95 yards, 8:55); Commodores 10-0
- (5:04) UK - DJ Miller 9-yard pass from Kenny Minchey (Adam Zouagui kick) (Drive: 7 plays, 75 yards, 3:59); Commodores 10-7
- (0:21) UK - Willie Rodriguez 1-yard run (Adam Zouagui kick) (Drive: 13 plays, 79 yards, 3:28); Wildcats 14-10

Third quarter

- (10:35) UK - Brennen Ward 10-yard run (Adam Zouagui kick) (Drive: 8 plays, 75 yards, 4:25); Wildcats 21-10
- (5:45) VAN - Ja'Cory Thomas 34-yard pass from Jared Curtis (Brock Taylor kick) (Drive: 9 plays, 75 yards, 4:50); Wildcats 21-17
- (1:24) UK - Adam Zouagui 47-yard field goal (Drive: 10 plays, 46 yards, 4:21); Wildcats 24-17

Fourth quarter

- (14:10) UK - Adam Zouagui 32-yard field goal (Drive: 4 plays, 4 yards, 1:04); Wildcats 27-17
- (5:11) UK - Kenny Minchey 1-yard run (Adam Zouagui kick) (Drive: 13 plays, 77 yards, 6:38); Wildcats 34-17

Statistics	VAN	UK
First downs	15	24
Plays–yards	53–262	65–376
Rushes–yards	17–15	39–173
Passing yards	247	203
Passing: comp–att–int	27–36–1	19–26–0
Turnovers	2	0
Time of possession	28:57	31:03

Team	Category	Player	Statistics
Vanderbilt	Passing	Jared Curtis	27/36, 247 yards, 2 TD, INT
Vanderbilt	Rushing	Jared Curtis	8 carries, 6 yards
Vanderbilt	Receiving	Junior Sherrill	8 receptions, 78 yards
Kentucky	Passing	Kenny Minchey	19/26, 203 yards, TD
Kentucky	Rushing	Jovantae Barnes	15 carries, 68 yards
Kentucky	Receiving	Kenny Darby	4 receptions, 71 yards

=== at No. 13 Tennessee (rivalry) ===
No. 6 Kentucky Wildcats (7–1) at No. 13 Tennessee Volunteers (6–2) – Game summary

Quarter	1	2	3	4	Total
No. 6 Wildcats	0	6	0	0	6
No. 13 Volunteers	7	3	3	21	34

at Neyland Stadium • Knoxville, Tennessee

- Date: November 7
- Game time: TBA
- TV announcers (ESPN): Tom Hart, Roddy Jones, and Quint Kessenich

Game information

First quarter
Second quarter
Third quarter
Fourth quarter

Statistics	UK	TENN
First downs		
Plays–yards		
Rushes–yards		
Passing yards		
Passing: comp–att–int		
Turnovers		
Time of possession		

Team	Category	Player	Statistics
Kentucky	Passing		
Kentucky	Rushing		
Kentucky	Receiving		
Tennessee	Passing		
Tennessee	Rushing		
Tennessee	Receiving		

=== vs Florida (rivalry) ===
Florida Gators (5–4) at No. 11 Kentucky Wildcats (7–2) – Game summary

Quarter	1	2	3	4	Total
Gators	0	2	11	8	21
No. 11 Wildcats	7	0	7	0	14

at Kroger Field • Lexington, Kentucky

- Date: November 14
- Game time: TBA
- TV announcers (ESPN): Joe Tessitore, Jesse Palmer, and Kris Budden

Game information

First quarter
Second quarter
Third quarter
Fourth quarter

Statistics	FLA	UK
First downs		
Plays–yards		
Rushes–yards		
Passing yards		
Passing: comp–att–int		
Turnovers		
Time of possession		

Team	Category	Player	Statistics
Florida	Passing		
Florida	Rushing		
Florida	Receiving		
Kentucky	Passing		
Kentucky	Rushing		
Kentucky	Receiving		

=== at Missouri ===
No. 16 Kentucky Wildcats (7–3) at Missouri Tigers (6–4) – Game summary

Quarter	1	2	3	4	Total
No. 16 Wildcats	0	0	0	0	0
Tigers	0	0	0	0	0

at Faurot Field • Columbia, Missouri

- Date: November 21
- Game time: TBA
- TV announcers (SECN): Matt Schumacker, Aaron Murray, and Taylor Davis

Game information

First quarter
Second quarter
Third quarter
Fourth quarter

Statistics	UK	MIZ
First downs		
Plays–yards		
Rushes–yards		
Passing yards		
Passing: comp–att–int		
Turnovers		
Time of possession		

Team	Category	Player	Statistics
Kentucky	Passing		
Kentucky	Rushing		
Kentucky	Receiving		
Missouri	Passing		
Missouri	Rushing		
Missouri	Receiving		

=== vs Louisville (Governor's Cup) ===
Louisville Cardinals (8–3) at Kentucky Wildcats (7–4) – Game summary

Quarter	1	2	3	4	Total
Cardinals	0	0	0	0	0
Wildcats	0	0	0	0	0

at Kroger Field • Lexington, Kentucky

- Date: November 28
- Game time: 12:00 p.m.
- TV announcers (TBA): TBA

Game information

First quarter
Second quarter
Third quarter
Fourth quarter

Statistics	LOU	UK
First downs		
Plays–yards		
Rushes–yards		
Passing yards		
Passing: comp–att–int		
Turnovers		
Time of possession		

Team	Category	Player	Statistics
Louisville	Passing		
Louisville	Rushing		
Louisville	Receiving		
Kentucky	Passing		
Kentucky	Rushing		
Kentucky	Receiving		
