= 2026 Youngstown State Penguins football team =

American college football season

2026 Youngstown State Penguins football

FCS Playoffs
- Conference: Missouri Valley Football Conference

Ranking
- STATS: No. 6
- FCS Coaches: No. 8
- Record: 8–3 (6–2 MVFC)
- Head coach: Doug Phillips (7th season)
- Offensive coordinator: Mike Yurcich (2nd season)
- Defensive coordinator: Ryan Riemedio (1st season)
- Home stadium: Stambaugh Stadium

2026 Missouri Valley Football Conference standings
	Conf.			Overall
Team	W		L	W		L
No. 3 South Dakota State $^	7	–	1	10	–	2
No. 6 Youngstown State ^	6	–	2	8	–	3
No. 7 South Dakota ^	6	–	2	9	–	3
No. 10 North Dakota ^	5	–	3	8	–	4
No. 11 Illinois State ^	4	–	4	8	–	4
Southern Illinois	3	–	5	5	–	7
Northern Iowa	3	–	5	4	–	7
Murray State	2	–	6	3	–	9
Indiana State	0	–	8	2	–	10
$ – Conference champion; ^ – FCS playoff participant; As of November 22, 2026; Rankings from STATS Poll

The 2026 Youngstown State Penguins football team represents Youngstown State University as a member of the Missouri Valley Football Conference (MVFC) during the 2026 NCAA Division I FCS football season. The Penguins are led by seventh-year head coach Doug Phillips, and play their home games at Stambaugh Stadium located in Youngstown, Ohio.

== Preseason ==
=== MVFC poll ===
The Missouri Valley Football Conference released its preseason poll on July 14, 2026, voted on by league athletic directors, coaches, and media members. The Penguins were predicted to finish third in the conference.

== Schedule ==
Date	Time	Opponent	Rank	Site	TV	Result	Attendance
August 27	6:00 p.m.	Mercyhurst*	No. 9	Stambaugh Stadium; Youngstown, OH	ESPN+	W 43–10	8,214
September 5	1:00 p.m.	at Kentucky*	No. 9	Kroger Field; Lexington, KY	SECN+/ESPN+	L 13–45	60,166
September 12	2:00 p.m.	Duquesne*	No. 10	Stambaugh Stadium; Youngstown, OH	ESPN+	W 70–13	10,824
September 19	7:00 p.m.	at No. 2 South Dakota State	No. 9	Dana J. Dykhouse Stadium; Brookings, SD	ESPN+	L 20–27	18,541
September 26	2:00 p.m.	No. 8 South Dakota	No. 11	Stambaugh Stadium; Youngstown, OH	ESPN+	W 47–28	8,849
October 3	5:00 p.m.	at No. 21 Southern Illinois	No. 8	Saluki Stadium; Carbondale, IL	ESPN+	W 28–16	6,180
October 10	2:00 p.m.	at Indiana State	No. 8	Memorial Stadium; Terre Haute, IN	ESPN+	W 57–24	4,428
October 17	6:00 p.m.	No. 19 Northern Iowa^{†}	No. 6	Stambaugh Stadium; Youngstown, OH	ESPN+	W 35–22	10,284
October 31	12:00 p.m.	No. 9 North Dakota	No. 4	Stambaugh Stadium; Youngstown, OH	ESPN+	W 31–28	9,415
November 7	2:00 p.m.	at Murray State	No. 4	Roy Stewart Stadium; Murray, KY	ESPN+	W 62–35	3,567
November 14	4:30 p.m.	No. 15 Illinois State	No. 3	Stambaugh Stadium; Youngstown, OH	ESPN+	L 33–34	7,886
*Non-conference game; ^{†}Homecoming; Rankings from STATS Poll released prior to the game; All times are in Eastern time

== Rankings ==
Ranking movements Legend: ██ Increase in ranking ██ Decrease in ranking ( ) = First-place votes
	Week														
Poll	Pre	1	2	3	4	5	6	7	8	9	10	11	12	13	Final
STATS	9	9	10	9	11	8	8	6	4 (1)	4 (2)	4 (3)	3 (2)	6		
Coaches	9	7	10	9	13	10	9	6	4	4	4	3	8		

== Game summaries ==
All times in Eastern time.

=== Mercyhurst ===
Mercyhurst Lakers (0–0) at No. 9 Youngstown State Penguins (0–0) – Game summary

Quarter	1	2	3	4	Total
Lakers	3	0	0	7	10
No. 9 Penguins	7	22	7	7	43

at Stambaugh Stadium, Youngstown, OH

- Date: August 27, 2026
- Game time: 6:00 p.m.
- Game weather: Cloudy • Temperature: 78 °F (26 °C) • Wind: NW at 8 miles per hour (13 km/h)
- Game attendance: 8,214
- Referee: John Shay
- TV announcers (ESPN+): Drae Smith and Kyle Sirl

Game information
First quarter
- (9:38) MERC – Rocco Marcantonio 24-yard field goal (Drive: 10 plays, 63 yards, 5:22; Mercyhurst 3–0)
- (3:59) YSU – Beau Brungard 5-yard run, Andrew Lastovka kick (Drive: 12 plays, 72 yards, 5:33; Youngstown State 7–3)

Second quarter

- (13:31) YSU – Lynn Wyche-El 11-yard pass from Beau Brungard, Beau Brungard pass to Max Welter for two-point conversion (Drive: 5 plays, 76 yards, 2:23; Youngstown State 15–3)
- (5:13) YSU – Jaden Gilbert 24-yard run, Andrew Lastovka kick (Drive: 10 plays, 82 yards, 6:06; Youngstown State 22–3)
- (0:23) YSU – Beau Brungard 9-yard run, Andrew Lastovka kick (Drive: 9 plays, 52 yards, 1:49; Youngstown State 29–3)

Third quarter

- (9:40) YSU – Bryan Hunt 27-yard pass from Beau Brungard, Andrew Lastovka kick (Drive: 10 plays, 77 yards, 5:13; Youngstown State 36–3)

Fourth quarter

- (9:52) YSU – Jaden Gilbert 8-yard pass from Beau Brungard, Andrew Lastovka kick (Drive: 7 plays, 82 yards, 3:43; Youngstown State 43–3)
- (1:50) MERC – Sha'lik Hampton 2-yard pass from Alex Gevaudan, Rocco Marcantonio kick (Drive: 5 plays, 53 yards, 1:54; Youngstown State 43–10)

Statistics	MERC	YSU
First downs	16	27
Plays–yards	51–241	66–484
Rushes–yards	20–29	36–252
Passing yards	212	232
Passing: comp–att–int	18–31–2	20–30–1
Turnovers	2	1
Time of possession	27:26	32:34

Team	Category	Player	Statistics
Mercyhurst	Passing	Alex Gevaudan	18/31, 212 yards, TD, 2 INT
Mercyhurst	Rushing	Jameir Gamble	9 carries, 36 yards
Mercyhurst	Receiving	Camden Lewis	3 receptions, 44 yards
Youngstown State	Passing	Beau Brungard	20/29, 232 yards, 3 TD, INT
Youngstown State	Rushing	Beau Brungard	21 carries, 119 yards, 2 TD
Youngstown State	Receiving	Antuan Gardner	2 receptions, 52 yards

=== at Kentucky (FBS) ===
No. 9 Youngstown State Penguins (1–0) at Kentucky Wildcats (FBS) (0–0) – Game summary

Quarter	1	2	3	4	Total
No. 9 Penguins	0	7	6	0	13
Wildcats (FBS)	14	14	7	10	45

at Kroger Field, Lexington, KY

- Date: September 5, 2026
- Game time: 1:00 p.m.
- Game weather: Sunny • Temperature: 87 °F (31 °C) • Wind: SE at 5 miles per hour (8.0 km/h)
- Game attendance: 60,166
- Referee: Kyle Olson
- TV announcers (SECN+/ESPN+): Kevin Fitzgerald and Charlie Strong

Game information
First quarter
- (11:29) UK – CJ Baxter 15-yard run, Adam Zouagui kick (Drive: 7 plays, 75 yards, 3:31; Kentucky 7–0)
- (6:25) UK – CJ Baxter 5-yard run, Adam Zouagui kick (Drive: 7 plays, 60 yards, 3:35; Kentucky 14–0)

Second quarter

- (11:30) UK – Mikkel Skinner 10-yard pass from Kenny Minchey, Adam Zouagui kick (Drive: 7 plays, 59 yards, 4:02; Kentucky 21–0)
- (1:51) UK – Willie Rodriguez 2-yard pass from Kenny Minchey, Adam Zouagui kick (Drive: 5 plays, 28 yards, 2:10; Kentucky 28–0)
- (0:20) YSU – Lynn Wyche-El 6-yard pass from Beau Brungard, Andrew Lastovka kick (Drive: 12 plays, 75 yards, 1:31; Kentucky 28–7)

Third quarter

- (8:19) UK – Prince Jean 26-yard pass from Kenny Minchey, Adam Zouagui kick (Drive: 9 plays, 75 yards, 3:25; Kentucky 35–7)
- (3:41) YSU – Jaden Gilbert 9-yard run, Andrew Lastovka kick failed (Drive: 9 plays, 75 yards, 4:38; Kentucky 35–13)

Fourth quarter

- (12:48) UK – Kenny Darby 37-yard pass from Kenny Minchey, Adam Zouagui kick (Drive: 3 plays, 60 yards, 1:13; Kentucky 42–13)
- (5:29) UK – Adam Zouagui 28-yard field goal (Drive: 11 plays, 66 yards, 5:19; Kentucky 45–13)

Statistics	YSU	UK
First downs	20	24
Plays–yards	66–305	61–506
Rushes–yards	28–59	34–205
Passing yards	246	301
Passing: comp–att–int	24–38–0	18–27–0
Turnovers	1	0
Time of possession	30:08	29:52

Team	Category	Player	Statistics
Youngstown State	Passing	Beau Brungard	23/25, 243 yards, TD
Youngstown State	Rushing	Beau Brungard	12 carries, 29 yards
Youngstown State	Receiving	Lynn Wyche-El	7 receptions, 111 yards, TD
Kentucky	Passing	Kenny Minchey	18/27, 301 yards, 4 TD
Kentucky	Rushing	Jason Patterson	11 carries, 78 yards
Kentucky	Receiving	Kenny Darby	3 receptions, 74 yards, TD

=== Duquesne ===
Duquesne Dukes (0–1) at No. 10 Youngstown State Penguins (1–1) – Game summary

Quarter	1	2	3	4	Total
Dukes	3	7	0	3	13
No. 10 Penguins	21	28	7	14	70

at Stambaugh Stadium, Youngstown, OH

- Date: September 12, 2026
- Game time: 2:00 p.m.
- Game weather: Rain • Temperature: 77 °F (25 °C)
- Game attendance: 10,824
- Referee: David Hergert
- TV announcers (ESPN+): Drae Smith (play-by-play) and Chris Sammarone (analyst)

Game information
First quarter
- (9:38) DUQ – Matt Clark 25-yard field goal (Drive: 11 plays, 68 yards, 5:22; Duquesne 3–0)
- (5:40) YSU – Jaden Gilbert 3 yard pass from Beau Brungard, Andrew Lastovka kick (Drive: 10 plays, 56 yards, 3:48; Youngstown State 7–3)
- (1:47) YSU – Beau Brungard 3-yard run, Andrew Lastovka kick (Drive: 4 plays, 23 yards, 2:00; Youngstown State 14–3)
- (0:00) YSU – Dorian Williams 6-yard pass from Beau Brungard, Andrew Lastovka kick (Drive: 1 play, 6 yards, 0:00; Youngstown State 21–3)

Second quarter

- (10:28) DUQ – Ryan Petras 22-yard pass from Carson Camp, Matt Clark kick (Drive: 8 plays, 75 yards, 4:32; Youngstown State 21–10)
- (9:36) YSU – Jeremiah Sanders 36-yard pass from Beau Brungard, Andrew Lastovka kick (Drive: 3 plays, 75 yards, 0:52; Youngstown State 28–10)
- (7:33) YSU – Lynn Wyche-El 9-yard pass from Beau Brungard, Andrew Lastovka kick (Drive: 3 plays, 55 yards, 1:05; Youngstown State 35–10)
- (3:14) YSU – Bryan Hunt 4-yard pass from Beau Brungard, Andrew Lastovka kick (Drive: 7 plays, 83 yards, 2:49; Youngstown State 42–10)
- (0:40) YSU – Lynn Wyche-El 23-yard pass from Beau Brungard, Andrew Lastovka kick (Drive: 6 plays, 74 yards, 1:09; Youngstown State 49–10)

Third quarter

- (7:43) YSU – Beau Brungard 1-yard run, Andrew Lastovka kick (Drive: 13 plays, 75 yards, 7:17; Youngstown State 56–10)

Fourth quarter

- (14:10) YSU – Max Welter 54-yard pass from Malachi Lewis, Andrew Lastovka kick (Drive: 4 plays, 74 yards, 0:53; Youngstown State 63–10)
- (11:09) DUQ – Matt Clark 49-yard field goal (Drive: 6 plays, 24 yards, 2:55; Youngstown State 63–13)
- (8:09) YSU – Malachi Lewis 15-yard run, Andrew Lastovka kick (Drive: 6 plays, 73 yards, 3:00; Youngstown State 70–13)

Statistics	DUQ	YSU
First downs	13	32
Plays–yards	58–244	70–603
Rushes–yards	33–155	38–196
Passing yards	89	407
Passing: comp–att–int	8–25–0	28–32–0
Turnovers	0	0
Time of possession	29:00	31:00

Team	Category	Player	Statistics
Duquesne	Passing	Carson Camp	5/19, 63 yards, TD
Duquesne	Rushing	Ness Davis	11 carries, 88 yards
Duquesne	Receiving	Ryan Petras	3 receptions, 52 yards, TD
Youngstown State	Passing	Beau Brungard	20/23, 290 yards, 6 TD
Youngstown State	Rushing	Beau Brungard	14 carries, 111 yards, 2 TD
Youngstown State	Receiving	Lynn Wyche-El	5 receptions, 77 yards, 2 TD

=== at No. 2 South Dakota State ===
No. 9 Youngstown State Penguins (2–1) at No. 2 South Dakota State Jackrabbits (2–1) – Game summary

Quarter	1	2	3	4	Total
No. 9 Penguins	0	10	7	3	20
No. 2 Jackrabbits	7	10	10	0	27

at Dana J. Dykhouse Stadium, Brookings, SD

- Date: September 19, 2026
- Game time: 7:00 p.m.
- Game weather: Cloudy • Temperature: 60 °F (16 °C) • Wind: NE at 8 miles per hour (13 km/h)
- Game attendance: 18,541
- Referee: Jason Perkins
- TV announcers (ESPN+): Tyler Merriam (play-by-play) and Kurtiss Riggs (analyst)

Game information
First quarter
- (8:50) SDST – Josiah Johnson 4-yard run, Tristan Alvano kick (Drive: 11 plays, 84 yards, 6:05; South Dakota State 7–0)

Second quarter

- (10:23) YSU – Andrew Lastovka 39-yard field goal (Drive: 12 plays, 59 yards, 5:44; South Dakota State 7–3)
- (3:35) YSU – Alex McDonald 11-yard pass from Beau Brungard, Andrew Lastovka kick (Drive: 9 plays, 94 yards, 4:36; Youngstown State 10–7)
- (0:53) SDST – Chase Mason 18-yard run, Tristan Alvano kick (Drive: 7 plays, 71 yards, 2:41; South Dakota State 14–10)
- (0:10) SDST – Tristan Alvano 27-yard field goal (Drive: 5 plays, 17 yards, 0:35; South Dakota State 17–10)

Third quarter

- (7:55) SDST – Josiah Johnson 16-yard run, Tristan Alvano kick (Drive: 8 plays, 80 yards, 4:14; South Dakota State 24–10)
- (0:00) SDST – Tristan Alvano 43-yard field goal (Drive: 10 plays, 50 yards, 4:32; South Dakota State 27–17)

Fourth quarter

- (1:56) Andrew Lastovka 34-yard field goal (Drive: 5 plays, 53 yards, 2:02; South Dakota State 27–20)

Statistics	YSU	SDST
First downs	20	26
Plays–yards	58–349	66–461
Rushes–yards	23–57	45–308
Passing yards	292	153
Passing: comp–att–int	27–35–1	12–21–0
Turnovers	1	1
Time of possession	28:38	31:22

Team	Category	Player	Statistics
Youngstown State	Passing	Beau Brungard	27/35, 292 yards, 2 TD, INT
Youngstown State	Rushing	Beau Brungard	13 carries, 32 yards
Youngstown State	Receiving	Lynn Wyche-El	7 receptions, 114 yards, TD
South Dakota State	Passing	Chase Mason	9/13, 137 yards
South Dakota State	Rushing	Josiah Johnson	30 carries, 238 yards, 2 TD
South Dakota State	Receiving	Lofton O'Groske	7 receptions, 94 yards

=== No. 8 South Dakota ===
No. 8 South Dakota Coyotes (3–1) at No. 11 Youngstown State Penguins (2–2) – Game summary

Quarter	1	2	3	4	Total
No. 8 Coyotes	7	7	7	7	28
No. 11 Penguins	7	16	3	21	47

at Stambaugh Stadium, Youngstown, OH

- Date: September 26, 2026
- Game time: 2:00 p.m.
- Game weather: Sunny • Temperature: 69 °F (21 °C) • Wind: N at 10 miles per hour (16 km/h)
- Game attendance: 8,849
- Referee: Gregory Gompf
- TV announcers (ESPN+): Drae Smith (play-by-play) and Chris Sammarone (analyst)

Game information
First quarter
- (12:08) YSU – Lynn Wyche-El 10-yard run, Andrew Lastovka kick (Drive: 7 plays, 75 yards, 2:52; Youngstown State 7–0)
- (7:20) SDAK – Jackson Proctor 7-yard run, Bohdie Ing kick (Drive: 9 plays, 64 yards, 4:43; Tied 7–7)

Second quarter

- (13:19) YSU – Beau Brungard 2-yard run, Andrew Lastovka kick (Drive: 9 plays, 52 yards, 3:34; Youngstown State 14–7)
- (7:43) YSU – Lynn Wyche-El 41-yard run, Andrew Lastovka kick failed (Drive: 7 plays, 85 yards, 3:38; Youngstown State 20–7)
- (2:17) SDAK – Tysen Boze 9-yard pass from Austyn Modrzewski, Bohdie Ing kick (Drive: 11 plays, 75 yards, 5:26; Youngstown State 20–14)
- (0:02) YSU – Andrew Lastovka 23-yard field goal (Drive: 11 plays, 72 yards, 2:11; Youngstown State 23–14)

Third quarter

- (8:43) SDAK – Jackson Proctor 22-yard run, Bohdie Ing kick (Drive: 10 plays, 71 yards, 6:13; Youngstown State 23–21)
- (2:04) YSU – Andrew Lastovka 21-yard field goal (Drive: 5 plays, 22 yards, 2:51; Youngstown State 26–21)

Fourth quarter

- (11:54) YSU – Alex McDonald 4-yard pass from Beau Brungard, Andrew Lastovka kick (Drive: 8 plays, 94 yards, 3:06; Youngstown State 33–21)
- (5:55) YSU – Beau Brungard 9-yard run, Andrew Lastovka kick (Drive: 6 plays, 41 yards, 3:10; Youngstown State 40–21)
- (4:06) YSU – Beau Brungard 7-yard run, Andrew Lastovka kick (Drive: 3 plays, 5 yards, 0:59; Youngstown State 47–21)
- (0:32) SDAK – Carson Fletcher 1-yard run, Bohdie Ing kick (Drive: 10 plays, 75 yards, 3:34; Youngstown State 47–28)

Statistics	SDAK	YSU
First downs	17	26
Plays–yards	60–332	65–502
Rushes–yards	185–38	343–48
Passing yards	147	159
Passing: comp–att–int	16–22–2	13–17–0
Turnovers	3	0
Time of possession	31:37	28:23

Team	Category	Player	Statistics
South Dakota	Passing	Austyn Modrzewski	16/22, 147 yards, TD, 2 INT
South Dakota	Rushing	Carson Fletcher	8 carries, 59 yards, TD
South Dakota	Receiving	Brayden White	5 receptions, 37 yards
Youngstown State	Passing	Beau Brungard	13/17, 159 yards, TD
Youngstown State	Rushing	Beau Brungard	28 carries, 170 yards, 3 TD
Youngstown State	Receiving	Jaden Gilbert	3 receptions, 41 yards

=== at No. 21 Southern Illinois ===
No. 8 Youngstown State Penguins (3–2) at No. 21 Southern Illinois Salukis (3–2) – Game summary

Quarter	1	2	3	4	Total
No. 8 Penguins	0	7	14	7	28
No. 21 Salukis	3	7	0	6	16

at Saluki Stadium, Carbondale, IL

- Date: October 3, 2026
- Game time: 5:00 p.m.
- Game weather: Sunny • Temperature: 75 °F (24 °C) • Wind: NE at 5 miles per hour (8.0 km/h)
- Game attendance: 6,180
- Referee: Carl Chapman
- TV announcers (ESPN+): Larry Larson (play-by-play) and Dominique Daffney (analyst)

Game information
First quarter
- (10:37) SIU – Seth Adams 44-yard field goal (Drive: 10 plays, 49 yards, 4:23; Southern Illinois 3–0)

Second quarter

- (11:27) YSU – Lynn Wyche-El 1-yard run, Andrew Lastovka kick (Drive: 9 plays, 84 yards, 4:00; Youngstown State 7–3)
- (7:57) SIU – DJ Williams 1-yard run, Weston Schofield kick (Drive: 8 plays, 75 yards, 3:30; Southern Illinois 10–7)

Third quarter

- (4:04) YSU – Beau Brungard 1-yard run, Andrew Lastovka kick (Drive: 11 plays, 61 yards, 6:06; Youngstown State 14–10)
- (2:42) YSU – Austin Bray 20-yard pass from Beau Brungard, Andrew Lastovka kick (Drive: 1 play, 20 yards, 0:09; Youngstown State 21–10)

Fourth quarter

- (3:37) YSU – Jaden Gilbert 8-yard run, Andrew Lastovka kick (Drive: 12 plays, 80 yards, 8:24; Youngstown State 28–10)
- (1:54) SIU – DJ Williams 14-yard run, DJ Williams conversion pass failed (Drive: 8 plays, 75 yards, 1:43; Youngstown State 28–16)

Statistics	YSU	SIU
First downs	23	24
Plays–yards	62–403	70–387
Rushes–yards	33–184	35–99
Passing yards	219	288
Passing: comp–att–int	20–29–2	19–35–1
Turnovers	2	2
Time of possession	30:26	29:34

Team	Category	Player	Statistics
Youngstown State	Passing	Beau Brungard	20/29, 219 yards, TD, 2 INT
Youngstown State	Rushing	Beau Brungard	16 carries, 69 yards, TD
Youngstown State	Receiving	Austin Bray	5 receptions, 78 yards, TD
Southern Illinois	Passing	DJ Williams	19/35, 288 yards, INT
Southern Illinois	Rushing	Chandler Chapman	11 carries, 49 yards
Southern Illinois	Receiving	Kyle Thomas	8 receptions, 155 yards

=== at Indiana State ===
No. 8 Youngstown State Penguins (4–2) at Indiana State Sycamores (2–4) – Game summary

Quarter	1	2	3	4	Total
No. 8 Penguins	10	7	7	0	24
Sycamores	15	21	14	7	57

at Memorial Stadium, Terre Haute, IN

- Date: October 10, 2026
- Game time: 2:00 p.m.
- Game weather: Sunny
- Game attendance: 4,428
- Referee: Grant Henderson
- TV announcers (ESPN+): Brian Jennings (play-by-play) and Austin Osborn (analyst)

Game information
First quarter
- (13:36) INST – Max McCool 1-yard run, Sebastian Lopez kick (Drive: 4 plays, 75 yards, 1:24; Indiana State 7–0)
- (9:36) YSU – Jaden Gilbert 14-yard run, Andrew Lastovka kick (Drive: 9 plays, 75 yards, 4:00; Tied 7–7)
- (6:43) YSU – Jaden Gilbert 65-yard run, Beau Brungard run for two-point conversion (Drive: 2 plays, 71 yards, 0:42; Youngstown State 15–7)
- (3:19) INST – Sebastian Lopez 47-yard field goal (Drive: 10 plays, 56 yards, 3:24; Youngstown State 15–10)

Second quarter

- (13:53) YSU – Beau Brungard 1-yard run, Andrew Lastovka kick (Drive: 9 plays, 75 yards, 4:26; Youngstown State 22–10)
- (12:36) INST – Torey French 25-yard pass from Brady Allen, Sebastian Lopez kick (Drive: 4 plays, 75 yards, 1:17; Youngstown State 22–17)
- (8:07) Jaden Gilbert 12-yard run, Andrew Lastovka kick (Drive: 10 plays, 75 yards, 4:29; Youngstown State 29–17)
- (3:14) YSU – Lynn Wyche-El 36-yard pass from Beau Brungard, Andrew Lastovka kick (Drive: 6 plays, 80 yards, 1:55; Youngstown State 36–17)

Third quarter

- (14:50) YSU – Bryan Hunt 75-yard pass from Beau Brungard, Andrew Lastovka kick (Drive: 1 play, 75 yards, 0:10; Youngstown State 43–17)
- (11:54) INST – Max McCool 37-yard run, Sebastian Lopez kick (Drive: 7 plays, 75 yards, 2:56; Youngstown State 43–24)
- (9:19) YSU – Jeremiah Sanders 16-yard pass from Beau Brungard, Andrew Lastovka kick (Drive: 6 plays, 64 yards, 2:35; Youngstown State 50–24)

Fourth quarter

- (12:07) YSU – Beau Brungard 1-yard run, Andrew Lastovka kick (Drive: 7 plays, 82 yards, 2:53; Youngstown State 57–24)

Statistics	YSU	INST
First downs	29	13
Plays–yards	75–696	57–328
Rushes–yards	39–279	28–29
Passing yards	417	299
Passing: comp–att–int	20–29–0	26–36–0
Turnovers	0	0
Time of possession	33:49	26:11

Team	Category	Player	Statistics
Youngstown State	Passing	Beau Brungard	25/34, 386 yards, 3 TD
Youngstown State	Rushing	Jaden Gilbert	15 carries, 163 yards, 3 TD
Youngstown State	Receiving	Lynn Wyche-El	10 receptions, 118 yards, TD
Indiana State	Passing	Brady Allen	20/28, 299 yards, TD
Indiana State	Rushing	Max McCool	11 carries, 38 yards, 2 TD
Indiana State	Receiving	Jayden Reed	7 receptions, 122 yards

=== No. 19 Northern Iowa ===
No. 19 Northern Iowa Panthers (3–2) at No. 6 Youngstown State Penguins (5–2) – Game summary

Quarter	1	2	3	4	Total
No. 19 Panthers	0	7	9	6	22
No. 6 Penguins	14	14	0	7	35

at Stambaugh Stadium, Youngstown, OH

- Date: October 17, 2026
- Game time: 6:00 p.m.
- Game weather: Sunny • Temperature: 49 °F (9 °C) • Wind: NW at 5 miles per hour (8.0 km/h)
- Game attendance: 10,284
- Referee: Gregory Gompf
- TV announcers (ESPN+): Drae Smith (play-by-play) and Chris Sammarone (analyst)

Game information
First quarter
- (14:48) YSU – Donald Barksdale 93-yard kickoff return, Andrew Lastovka kick (Youngstown State 7–0)
- (4:39) YSU – Antuan Gardner 2-yard run, Andrew Lastovka kick (Drive: 11 plays, 80 yards, 4:56; Youngstown State 14–0)

Second quarter

- (14:51) YSU – Lynn Wyche-El 42-yard pass from Beau Brungard, Andrew Lastovka kick (Drive: 7 plays, 80 yards, 2:54; Youngstown State 21–0)
- (7:24) YSU – Beau Brungard 1-yard run, Andrew Lastovka kick (Drive: 12 plays, 70 yards, 6:19; Youngstown State 21–0)
- (0:56) UNI – Kai Black 24-yard pass from Jaxon Dailey, Max Bartachek kick (Drive: 12 plays, 75 yards, 6:28; Youngstown State 28–7)

Third quarter

- (10:31) UNI – Brady McCullough 16-yard pass from Jaxon Dailey, Max Bartachek kick blocked (Drive: 9 plays, 75 yards, 4:29; Youngstown State 28–13)
- (5:30) UNI – Max Bartachek 45-yard field goal (Drive: 6 plays, 9 yards, 3:18; Youngstown State 28–16)

Fourth quarter

- (14:53) YSU – Bryan Hunt 16-yard pass from Beau Brungard, Andrew Lastovka kick (Drive: 11 plays, 58 yards, 5:37; Youngstown State 35–16)
- (3:59) UNI – Ayden Price 17-yard pass from Jaxon Dailey, Jaxon Dailey conversion pass failed (Drive: 15 plays, 87 yards, 3:51; Youngstown State 35–22)

Statistics	UNI	YSU
First downs	28	25
Plays–yards	72–371	64–420
Rushes–yards	23–53	37–180
Passing yards	318	240
Passing: comp–att–int	29–49–0	23–37–0
Turnovers	0	0
Time of possession	30:19	29:41

Team	Category	Player	Statistics
Northern Iowa	Passing	Jaxon Dailey	28/49, 318 yards, 3 TD
Northern Iowa	Rushing	Ben Gordon	4 carries, 45 yards
Northern Iowa	Receiving	Kai Black	3 receptions, 74 yards, TD
Youngstown State	Passing	Beau Brungard	23/37, 240 yards, 2 TD
Youngstown State	Rushing	Beau Brungard	17 carries, 80 yards, TD
Youngstown State	Receiving	Lynn Wyche-El	8 receptions, 106 yards, TD

=== No. 9 North Dakota ===
No. 9 North Dakota Fighting Hawks (6–3) at No. 4 Youngstown State Penguins (6–2) – Game summary

Quarter	1	2	3	4	Total
No. 9 Fighting Hawks	13	8	7	0	28
No. 4 Penguins	7	0	14	10	31

at Stambaugh Stadium, Youngstown, OH

- Date: October 31, 2026
- Game time: 12:00 p.m.
- Game weather: Sunny • Temperature: 53 °F (12 °C) • Wind: SE at 5 miles per hour (8.0 km/h)
- Game attendance: 9,415
- Referee: Grant Henderson
- TV announcers (ESPN+): Anthony Romo (play-by-play) and Braylon Heard (analyst)

Game information
First quarter
- (11:19) YSU – Lynn Wyche-El 49-yard pass from Beau Brungard, Andrew Lastovka kick (Drive: 8 plays, 84 yards, 3:34; Youngstown State 7–0)
- (7:53) UND – Haydn Stay 6-yard pass from Jerry Kaminski, Kenten Laughman kick blocked (Drive: 9 plays, 75 yards, 3:26; Youngstown State 7–6)
- (5:44) UND – Charles Langama 2-yard run, Kenten Laughman kick (Drive: 4 plays, 34 yards, 1:41; North Dakota 13–7)

Second quarter

- (7:03) UND – Jerry Kaminski 9-yard pass from Javance Tupou'ata-Johnson, Samuel Kline pass for two-point conversion (Drive: 19 plays, 91 yards, 8:55; North Dakota 21–7)

Third quarter

- (13:25) YSU – Jaden Gilbert 5-yard run, Andrew Lastovka kick (Drive: 2 plays, 7 yards, 0:38; North Dakota 21–14)
- (8:33) UND – Jerry Kaminski 11-yard run, Kenten Laughman kick (Drive: 9 plays, 75 yards, 4:52; North Dakota 28–14)
- (2:09) YSU – Lynn Wyche-El 15-yard pass from Beau Brungard, Andrew Lastovka kick (Drive: 10 plays, 58 yards, 3:36; North Dakota 28–21)

Fourth quarter

- (10:28) YSU – Andrew Lastovka 37-yard field goal (Drive: 9 plays, 70 yards, 3:21; North Dakota 28–24)
- (2:04) YSU – Lynn Wyche-El 20-yard pass from Beau Brungard, Andrew Lastovka kick (Drive: 12 plays, 86 yards, 6:09; Youngstown State 31–28)

Statistics	UND	YSU
First downs	23	21
Plays–yards	70–367	67–453
Rushes–yards	36–163	38–185
Passing yards	204	268
Passing: comp–att–int	19–34–2	19–29–0
Turnovers	2	1
Time of possession	30:24	29:36

Team	Category	Player	Statistics
North Dakota	Passing	Jerry Kaminski	18/33, 195 yards, TD, 2 INT
North Dakota	Rushing	Matt Lawson	17 carries, 99 yards
North Dakota	Receiving	Deng Deng	7 receptions, 84 yards
Youngstown State	Passing	Beau Brungard	19/29, 268 yards, TD
Youngstown State	Rushing	Jaden Gilbert	13 carries, 68 yards, TD
Youngstown State	Receiving	Lynn Wyche-El	6 receptions, 148 yards, 3 TD

=== at Murray State ===
No. 4 Youngstown State Penguins (7–2) at Murray State Racers (1–8) – Game summary

Quarter	1	2	3	4	Total
No. 4 Penguins	14	21	14	13	62
Racers	7	0	14	14	35

at Roy Stewart Stadium, Murray, KY

- Date: November 7, 2026
- Game time: 2:00 p.m.
- Game weather: Sunny • Temperature: 52 °F (11 °C) • Wind: S at 6 miles per hour (9.7 km/h)
- Game attendance: 3,567
- Referee: Jason Berg
- TV announcers (ESPN+): Casey Roehl (play-by-play) and Rob Cross (analyst)

Game information
First quarter
- (6:41) YSU – Max Welter 10-yard pass from Beau Brungard, Andrew Lastovka kick (Drive: 11 plays, 91 yards, 4:48; Youngstown State 7–0)
- (4:53) MUR – Trey Firestone 10-yard pass from Collin Shannon, Tyler Dorn kick (Drive: 4 plays, 83 yards, 1:43; Tied 7–7)
- (1:41) YSU – Antuan Gardner 9-yard run, Andrew Lastovka kick (Drive: 7 plays, 42 yards 3:12; Youngstown State 14–7)

Second quarter

- (10:34) YSU – Bryan Hunt 19-yard pass from Beau Brungard, Andrew Lastovka kick (Drive: 7 plays, 71 yards, 3:17; Youngstown State 21–7)
- (7:51) YSU – Fresh Walter 28-yard pass from Beau Brungard, Andrew Lastovka kick (Drive: 4 plays, 90 yards, 1:49; Youngstown State 28–7)
- (0:24) YSU – Lynn Wyche-El 28-yard pass from Beau Brungard, Andrew Lastovka kick (Drive: 5 plays, 68 yards, 1:09; Youngstown State 35–7)

Third quarter

- (10:36) YSU – Antuan Gardner 2-yard run, Andrew Lastovka kick (Drive: 8 plays, 75 yards, 4:24; Youngstown State 42–7)
- (6:18) MUR – Malachi Williams 15-yard pass from Collin Shannon, Tyler Dorn kick (Drive: 7 plays, 75 yards, 4:08; Youngstown State 42–14)
- (4:14) YSU – Jaden Gilbert 2-yard run, Andrew Lastovka kick (Drive: 5 plays, 44 yards, 2:03; Youngstown State 49–14)
- (0:54) MUR – Tyrell Campbell 5-yard run, Tyler Dorn kick (Drive: 6 plays, 75 yards, 3:14; Youngstown State 49–21)

Fourth quarter

- (11:43) YSU – Jaden Gilbert 1-yard run, Andrew Lastovka kick (Drive: 9 plays, 72 yards, 4:05; Youngstown State 56–21)
- (7:54) MUR – Cade Fields 32-yard run, Tyler Dorn kick (Drive: 7 plays, 75 yards, 3:49; Youngstown State 56–28)
- (2:36) YSU – Fresh Walters 7-yard pass from Malachi Lewis, Evan Anderson rush failed (Drive: 10 plays, 43 yards, 5:16; Youngstown State 62–28)
- (0:04) MUR – Dylan Embry 3-yard pass from Collin Shannon, Tyler Dorn kick (Drive: 14 plays, 75 yards, 2:32; Youngstown State 62–35)

Statistics	YSU	MUR
First downs	31	33
Plays–yards	67–589	75–536
Rushes–yards	29–154	36–185
Passing yards	435	351
Passing: comp–att–int	34–38–0	23–39–0
Turnovers	0	0
Time of possession	30:16	29:44

Team	Category	Player	Statistics
Youngstown State	Passing	Beau Brungard	31/34, 423 yards, 4 TD
Youngstown State	Rushing	Jaden Gilbert	7 carries, 42 yards, 2 TD
Youngstown State	Receiving	Lynn Wyche-El	10 receptions, 145 yards, TD
Murray State	Passing	Collin Shannon	23/39, 351 yards, 3 TD
Murray State	Rushing	Tyrell Campbell	19 carries, 142 yards, TD
Murray State	Receiving	Jaxon Potter	6 receptions, 115 yards

=== No. 15 Illinois State ===
No. 15 Illinois State Redbirds (7–3) at No. 3 Youngstown State Penguins (8–2) – Game summary

Quarter	1	2	3	4	Total
No. 15 Redbirds	0	14	0	20	34
No. 3 Penguins	7	3	14	9	33

at Stambaugh Stadium, Youngstown, OH

- Date: November 14, 2026
- Game time: 4:30 p.m.
- Game weather: Rain • Temperature: 40 °F (4 °C) • Wind: NW at 10 miles per hour (16 km/h)
- Game attendance: 7,886
- Referee: Jason Perkins
- TV announcers (ESPN+): Ben Wilson (play-by-play)

Game information
First quarter
- (6:28) YSU – Beau Brungard 3-yard run, Andrew Lastovka kick (Drive: 13 plays, 65 yards, 6:59; Youngstown State 7–0)

Second quarter

- (14:13) ILST – Victor Dawson 7-yard run, Michael Cosentino kick (Drive: 11 plays, 75 yards, 7:15; Tied 7–7)
- (3:08) ILST – Seth Glatz 20-yard run, Michael Cosentino kick (Drive: 9 plays, 74 yards, 4:40; Illinois State 14–7)
- (0:34) YSU – Andrew Lastovka 26-yard field goal (Drive: 9 plays, 43 yards, 2:35; Illinois State 14–10)

Third quarter

- (9:27) YSU – Beau Brungard 4-yard run, Andrew Lastovka kick (Drive: 12 plays, 65 yards, 5:33; Youngstown State 17–14)
- (2:18) YSU – Jaden Gilbert 7-yard run, Andrew Lastovka kick (Drive: 11 plays, 70 yards, 4:42; Youngstown State 24–14)

Fourth quarter

- (13:40) YSU – Andrew Lastovka 45-yard field goal (Drive: 6 plays, 11 yards, 2:32; Youngstown State 27–14)
- (11:31) ILST – Mar'Quan Gary 27-yard pass from Beckham Pellant, Michael Cosentino kick (Drive: 5 plays, 75 yards, 2:09; Youngstown State 27–21)
- (3:29) ILST – Seth Glatz 7-yard run, Michael Cosentino kick (Drive: 12 plays, 89 yards, 7:06; Illinois State 28–27)
- (2:13) YSU – Bryan Hunt 59-yard pass from Beau Brungard, Fresh Walters conversion pass failed (Drive: 3 plays, 75 yards, 1:16; Youngstown State 33–28)
- (0:09) ILST – Beckham Pellant 2-yard run, Beckham Pellant conversion pass failed (Drive: 12 plays, 73 yards, 1:57; Illinois State 34–33)

Statistics	ILST	YSU
First downs	25	20
Plays–yards	66–398	65–377
Rushes–yards	257	199
Passing yards	141	178
Passing: comp–att–int	17–26–0	15–27–1
Turnovers	1	1
Time of possession	31:25	28:35

Team	Category	Player	Statistics
Illinois State	Passing	Beckham Pellant	17/26, 141 yards, TD
Illinois State	Rushing	Seth Glatz	25 carries, 176 yards, 2 TD
Illinois State	Receiving	Dylan Lord	6 receptions, 45 yards
Youngstown State	Passing	Beau Brungard	15/27, 178 yards, TD, INT
Youngstown State	Rushing	Beau Brungard	16 carries, 88 yards, 2 TD
Youngstown State	Receiving	Bryan Hunt	1 reception, 59 yards, TD
