= Anthony Lanier =

American gridiron football player (born 1993)

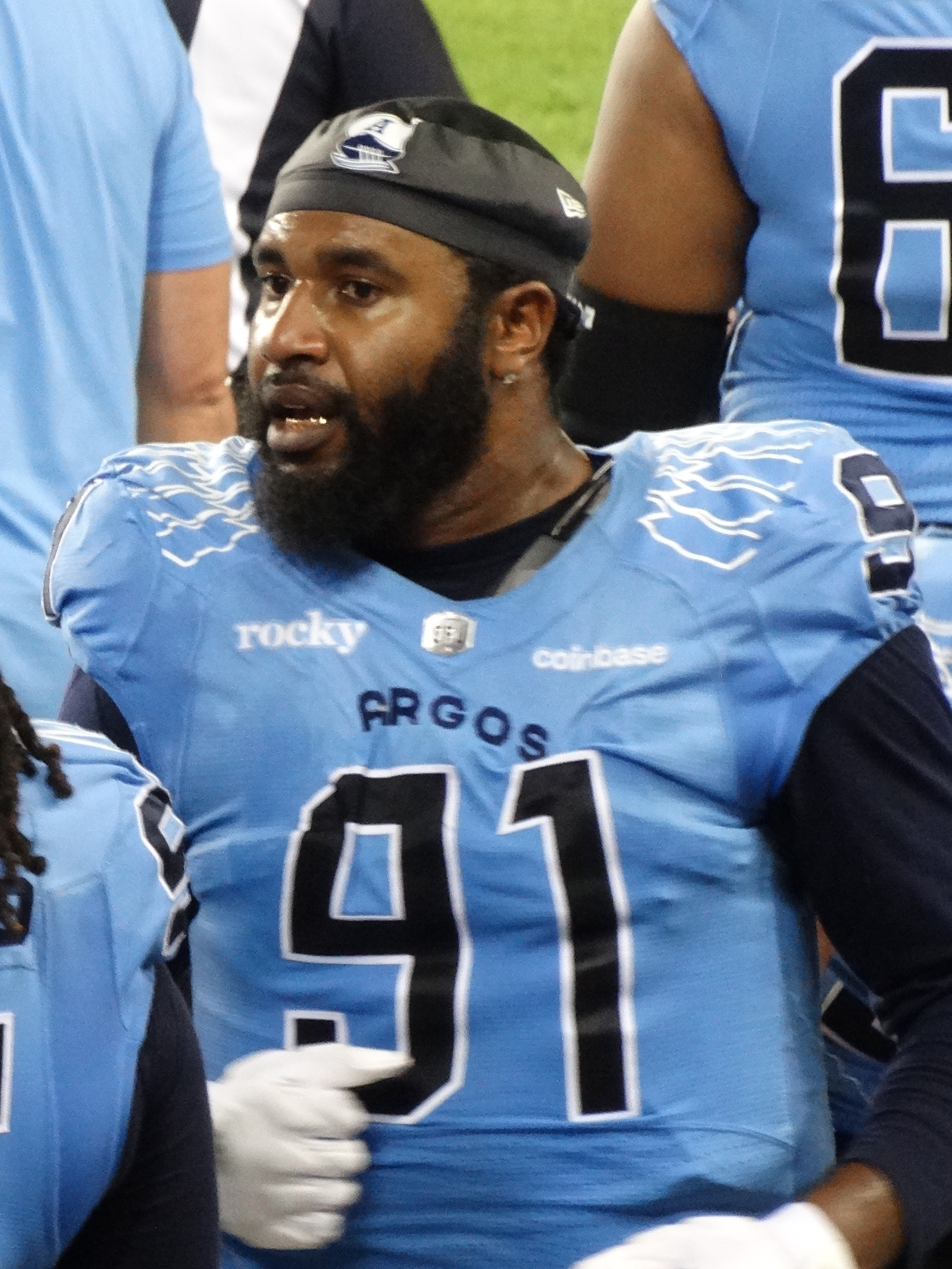
- Lanier with the Toronto Argonauts in 2025

Profile
- Position: Defensive end

Personal information
- Born: May 8, 1993 (age 33); Savannah, Georgia, U.S.
- Listed height: 6 ft 6 in (1.98 m)
- Listed weight: 285 lb (129 kg)

Career information
- High school: Herschel V. Jenkins
- College: Alabama A&M
- NFL draft: 2016: undrafted

Career history
- Washington Redskins (2016–2017); Los Angeles Chargers (2018–2019); Kansas City Chiefs (2020)*; New Orleans Saints (2020)*; Saskatchewan Roughriders (2021–2024); Toronto Argonauts (2025)
- * Offseason or practice squad member only

Career NFL statistics
- Total tackles: 14
- Sacks: 5
- Forced fumbles: 1
- Fumble recoveries: 2
- Stats at Pro Football Reference

Career CFL statistics as of 2025
- Games played: 59
- Tackles: 91
- Quarterback sacks: 19
- Interceptions: 0
- Forced fumbles: 3
- Stats at CFL.ca

Anthony Lanier II (born May 8, 1993) is an American professional football defensive end. He most recently played for the Toronto Argonauts of the Canadian Football League (CFL). He played college football at Alabama A&M and was signed by the Washington Redskins as an undrafted free agent in 2016.

== Professional career ==
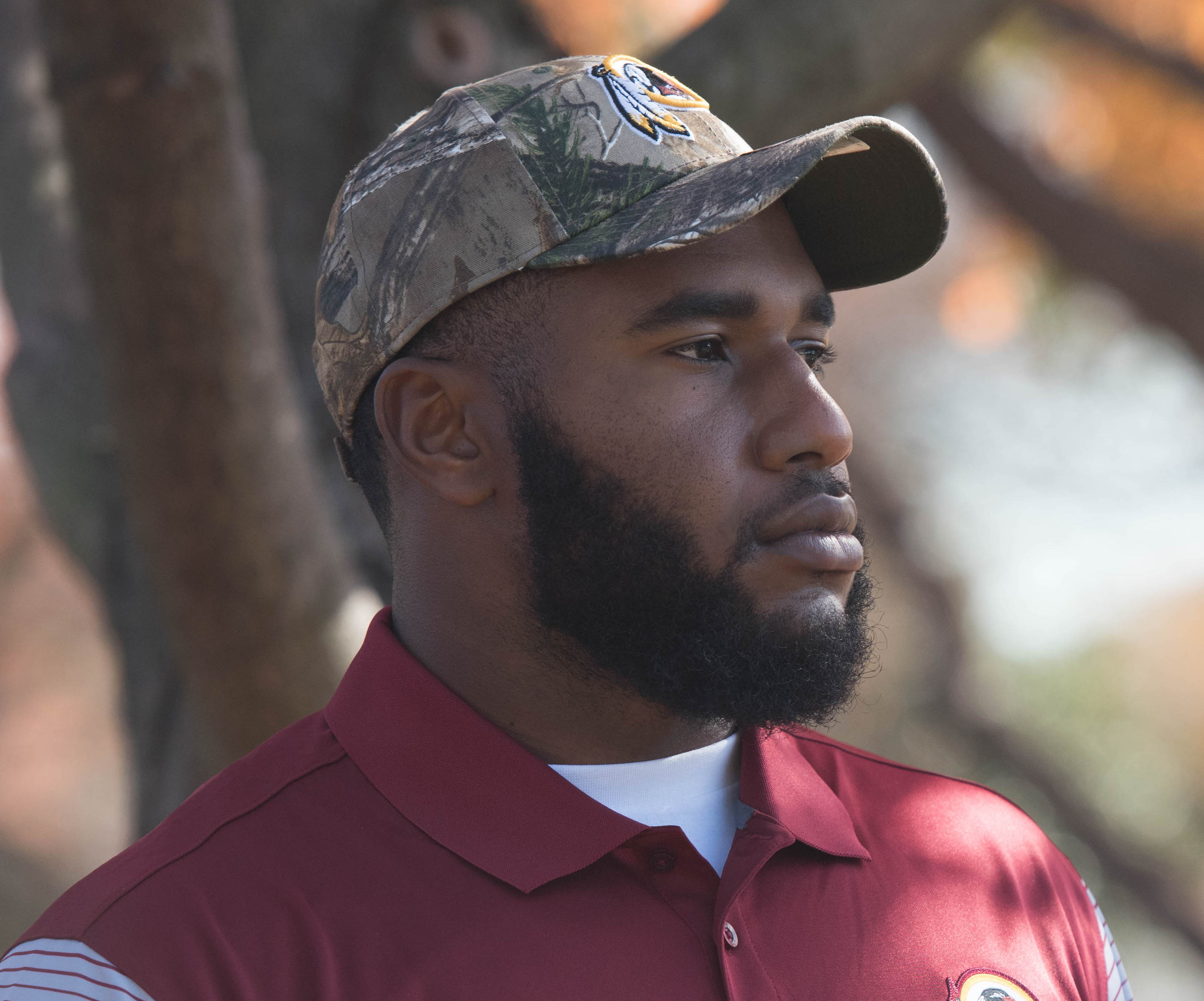
Lanier with the Washington Redskins in 2016

=== Washington Redskins ===
After going unselected in the 2016 NFL draft, Lanier signed with the Washington Redskins on May 6, 2016. Standing out in training camp and the preseason, the team announced he made the 53-man roster on September 3. In his NFL debut in Week 8, Lanier recovered a fumble forced by Chris Baker on Cincinnati Bengals quarterback Andy Dalton. He was placed on injured reserve on December 13.

Lanier was inactive for the first six games of 2017. In Week 11 against the New Orleans Saints, he recorded first career sack on Drew Brees. He would have a breakout performance in Week 15 against the Arizona Cardinals recording two sacks, three pass deflections, and a forced fumble. On September 3, 2018, the Redskins waived/injured Lanier. He went unclaimed in the waiver stage, and reverted to the team's injured reserve list before being waived with an injury settlement on September 8.

=== Los Angeles Chargers ===
On November 7, 2018, Lanier was signed to the Los Angeles Chargers' practice squad. He was promoted to the active roster on December 20.

On August 31, 2019, Lanier was waived by the Chargers; he was re-signed to the team's practice squad the next day. His practice squad contract with the team expired on January 6, 2020.

=== Kansas City Chiefs ===
On January 8, 2020, Lanier signed a reserve/future contract with the Kansas City Chiefs. He was waived by the Chiefs on April 28.

Lanier had a tryout with the Detroit Lions on August 19, 2020.

=== New Orleans Saints ===
Lanier was signed by the New Orleans Saints on August 29, 2020. He was placed on injured reserve on September 5, and waived with an injury settlement on September 11.

=== Saskatchewan Roughriders ===
Lanier signed with the Saskatchewan Roughriders of the CFL on March 2, 2021.

=== Toronto Argonauts ===
On February 12, 2025, it was announced that Lanier had signed a contract with the Toronto Argonauts. He spent one year with Toronto and became a free agent upon the expiry of his contract on February 10, 2026.
