= Will Stein =

American football player and coach (born 1989)

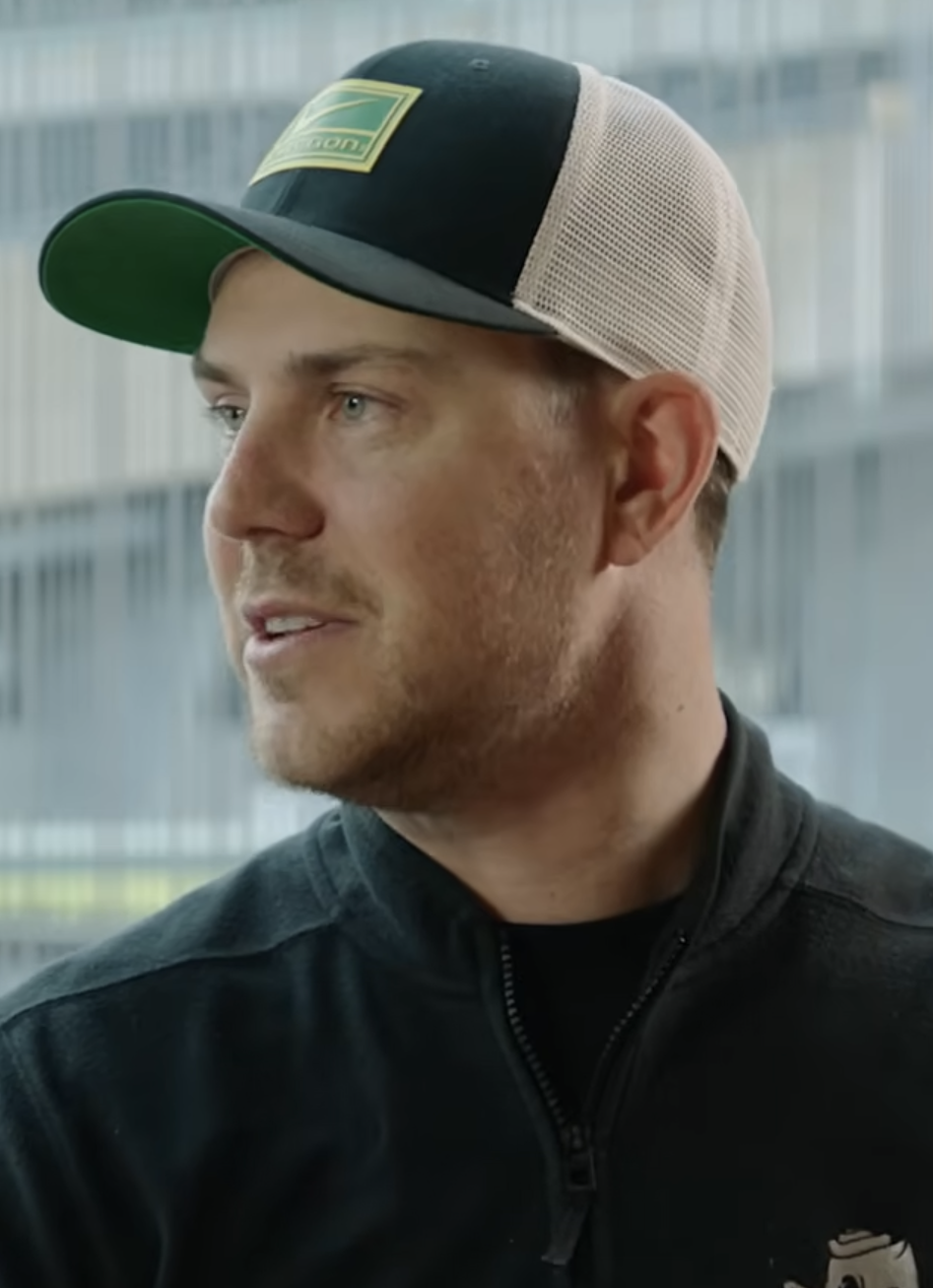
- Stein in 2025

Current position
- Title: Head coach
- Team: Kentucky
- Conference: SEC
- Record: 7–4

Biographical details
- Born: September 25, 1989 (age 37); Louisville, Kentucky, U.S.

Playing career
- 2008–2012: Louisville
- Position: Quarterback

Coaching career (HC unless noted)
- 2013: Louisville (GA)
- 2014: Louisville (QC)
- 2015–2017: Texas (QC)
- 2018–2019: Lake Travis HS (TX) (AHC/OC/QB)
- 2020–2021: UTSA (PGC/WR)
- 2022: UTSA (Co-OC/QB)
- 2023–2025: Oregon (OC/QB)
- 2026–present: Kentucky

Head coaching record
- Overall: 7–4

William Stein (born September 25, 1989) is an American college football coach and former player who is currently the head football coach at the University of Kentucky. Stein played college football for the Louisville Cardinals as a quarterback from 2008 to 2012. He has held various assistant coaching positions at the University of Louisville, University of Texas at Austin, Lake Travis High School, University of Texas at San Antonio (UTSA), and the University of Oregon.

== Playing career ==
Stein attended Louisville's Trinity High School where he set a single-season school record for touchdown passes and guided the Shamrocks to three state titles. After high school he walked-on at Louisville, where he played quarterback from 2008 to 2012.

=== Career statistics ===
Legend
**Bold**	Career high

Year	Team	Class	GP	Passing							Rushing			
Year	Team	Class	GP	Rating	Att	Comp	Pct	Yds	TD	Int	Att	Yds	Avg	TD
2008	Louisville	Freshman	(redshirt) Redshirted											
2009	Louisville	(redshirt) Freshman	4	101.0	78	43	55.1	450	0	**1**	**15**	-20	-1.3	0
2010	Louisville	(redshirt) Sophomore	3	131.1	14	9	**64.3**	72	1	0	2	**22**	**11.0**	0
2011	Louisville	(redshirt) Junior	6	**141.2**	**84**	**52**	61.9	**620**	**5**	**1**	24	6	0.3	0
2012	Louisville	(redshirt) Senior	**12**	91.2	34	20	58.8	131	0	0	12	8	0.7	0

== Coaching career ==
=== Louisville ===
After his playing career concluded, Stein stayed at Louisville as a graduate assistant and quality control coach from 2013 to 2014.

=== Texas ===
In 2015, Stein was named a quality control coach at Texas, joining his former college coach Charlie Strong and position coach Shawn Watson.

=== Lake Travis High School ===
Stein was the assistant head coach, offensive coordinator, and quarterbacks coach at Lake Travis High School in Texas from 2018 to 2019, where he coached Garrett Wilson.

=== UTSA ===
On December 20, 2019, Stein was named the passing game coordinator and wide receivers coach at UTSA. He was promoted to co-offensive coordinator and quarterbacks coach on January 8, 2022.

=== Oregon ===
On December 5, 2022, Stein was named the offensive coordinator and quarterbacks coach at the University of Oregon under head coach Dan Lanning.

Stein was allowed to coach Oregon's offense for the rest of the 2025 season as the Ducks made the College Football Playoff before beginning his tenure at the University of Kentucky.

=== Kentucky ===
On December 1, 2025, University of Kentucky (UK) athletic director Mitch Barnhart announced that Stein had been hired as Kentucky's head football coach.

== Coaching style ==
In a 2026 USA Today story, Blake Toppmeyer called Stein "an ace QB developer," with Stein telling him "We don’t just plug a person into the system and hope it works. We literally mold our system to the player that we have." As evidence, Toppmeyer noted that Stein's offensive emphasis changed from quarterback to quarterback. First, at UTSA, he added a large dose of quarterback draws and zone reads that meshed with Frank Harris' skill set. At Oregon, he first incorporated many empty-set formations (Note: Formations with no running backs.) that Bo Nix preferred to work out of. The next season, with Dillon Gabriel as the first-string QB, he incorporated many run-pass option plays and increased the offense's speed of play. Then, with Dante Moore, viewed by Toppmeyer as "a combination of Nix and Gabriel," he used elements of the systems he had used with those players. At UK, with Kenny Minchey, a Notre Dame transfer with strong improvisational abilities, Stein told Toppmeyer "We’re able to put more on him at the line of scrimmage to get us into the best plays possible."

== Head coaching record ==
Year	Team	Overall	Conference	Standing	Bowl/playoffs	Coaches^{#}	AP^{°}
**Kentucky Wildcats** (Southeastern Conference) (2026–present)
2026	Kentucky	7–4	5–4				
Kentucky:		7–4	5–4				
Total:		7–4					
^{#}Rankings from final Coaches Poll.; ^{°}Rankings from final AP Poll.
