= Pope Saint John Paul II Preparatory School =

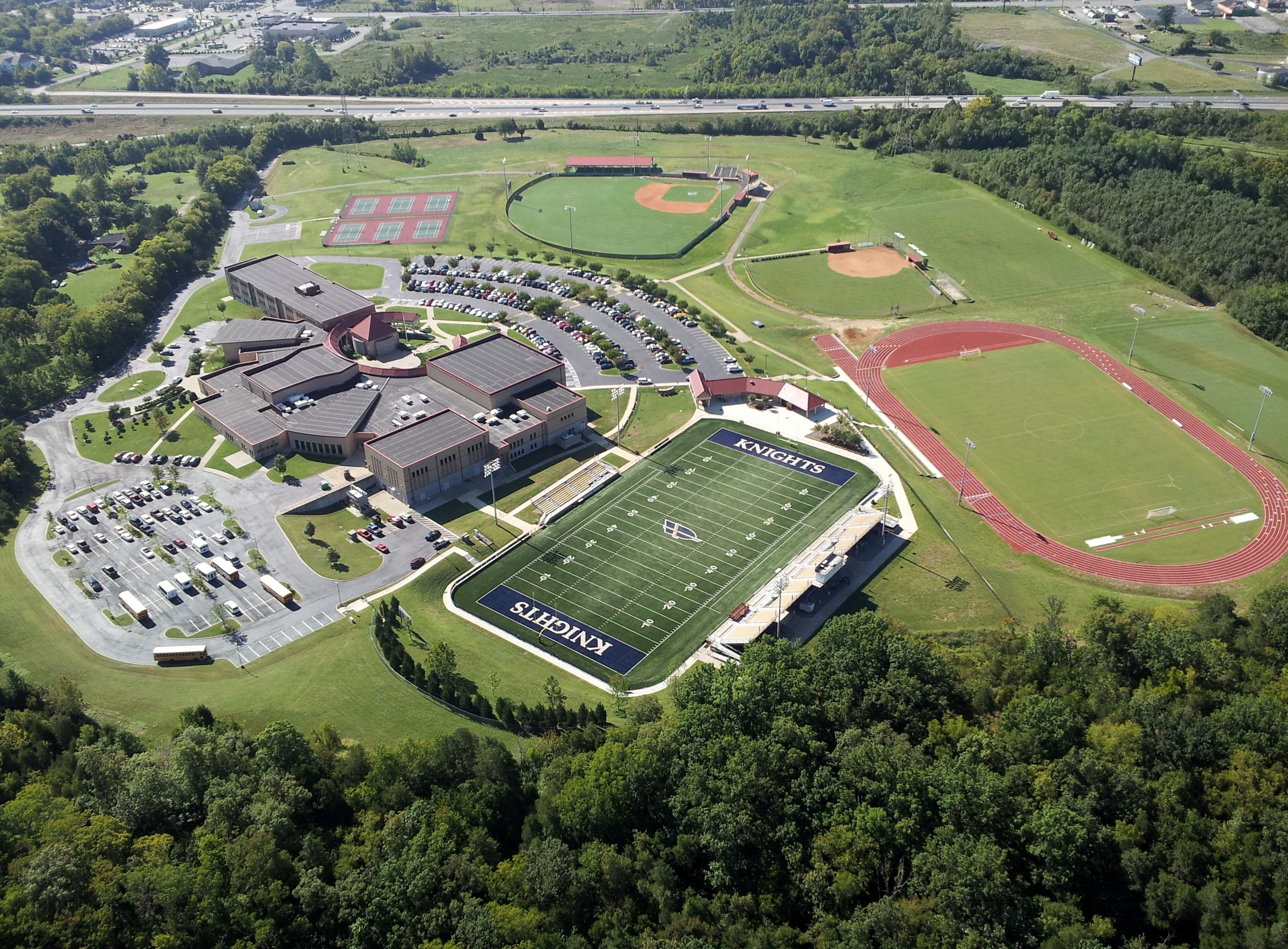
- The campus of Pope Saint John Paul II Preparatory School (2013)

Location
- 117 Caldwell Drive; Hendersonville, Tennessee 37075; United States; 36°18′57″N 86°40′12″W

Information
- Type: Private
- Motto: Faith Leads Us Beyond Ourselves
- Religious affiliation: Roman Catholic
- Established: 2002; 24 years ago
- Oversight: Roman Catholic Diocese of Nashville
- President: Erick Chittle
- Principal: Jennifer Dye
- Teaching staff: 88.1 (on an FTE basis)
- Grades: 6–12
- Enrollment: 753 (2021–2022)
- Student to teacher ratio: 8.5
- Colors: Navy and gold
- Nickname: Knights
- Accreditation: Southern Association of Colleges and Schools
- Yearbook: Excalibur
- Website: www.popeprep.org

Pope Saint John Paul II Preparatory School is a Catholic preparatory school in Hendersonville, Tennessee, United States. It is part of the Roman Catholic Diocese of Nashville.

== History ==
Pope Saint John Paul II Preparatory School opened in 2002 as Pope John Paul II High School. Hans Broekman was its first headmaster.

== Student life ==
As of the 2021–2022 school year, the school enrolls approximately 753 students. The student-to-teacher ratio is 8.5.

=== Football ===
The Pope Saint John Paul II Knights represent the school and are classified as Division II.

== Demographics ==
Student Demographic Profile
Race	Number enrolled, % (2019–2020)
White	461 (79.1%)
Asian or Asian/Pacific Islander	48 (8.2%)
Black or African American	46 (7.9%)
Hispanic/Latino	27 (4.6%)
American Indian or Alaska Native	1 (0.2%)

== In popular culture ==
- The football and prom scenes in Taylor Swift's music video for "You Belong With Me" were filmed at the school, which provided extras.

== Notable alumni ==
- Golden Tate (2007), former college football and baseball player for the Notre Dame Fighting Irish and former NFL Pro-Bowl wide receiver
- Josef Newgarden (2008), IndyCar Series driver
- Austin Swift (2010), actor and brother to Taylor Swift
- Jake Rucker (2018), baseball player in the Minnesota Twins organization
- Kenny Minchey (2023), college football quarterback for the Kentucky Wildcats and former college football quarterback for the Notre Dame Fighting Irish
- Katie Shea Collins (2024), soccer player for the South Carolina Gamecocks
