= Justin Burke =

American football coach

Current position
- Title: Tight ends coach
- Team: Kentucky
- Conference: SEC

Biographical details
- Born: November 12, 1987 (age 39); Lexington, Kentucky, U.S.

Playing career
- 2006–2007: NC State
- 2008–2010: Louisville
- Position: Quarterback

Coaching career (HC unless noted)
- 2011–2012: Louisville (GA)
- 2013: Louisville (OQC)
- 2014–2016: Texas (OQC)
- 2017–2019: South Florida (ST/TE)
- 2020–2021: UTSA (OA)
- 2022: UTSA (ST/TE)
- 2022: UTSA (co-OC/ST/TE) (bowl game)
- 2023: UTSA (OC/TE)
- 2024–2025: UTSA (OC/QB)
- 2026–present: Kentucky (TE)

Justin Burke (born November 12, 1987) is an American college football coach who serves as the tight ends coach for the University of Kentucky. He previously served as the offensive coordinator and quarterbacks coach at UTSA.

== Playing career ==
Burke grew up in Lexington, Kentucky and attended Lexington Catholic High School. He was named the Kentucky Gatorade Player of the Year as a senior after passing for 3,789 yards and 62 touchdowns against six interceptions. Burke was a highly rated recruit and committed to play college football at North Carolina State over offers from Tennessee, Kentucky, Louisville, Northwestern, Michigan State, Purdue, Ole Miss, Wake Forest, Rutgers, Western Michigan, and Toledo.

Burke began his college career at NC State and redshirted his true freshman season. He played in three games in garbage time situations the following year. Burke transferred to Louisville after his redshirt freshman season. He sat out the 2008 season due to NCAA transfer rules. Burke was named the Cardinals' starting quarterback entering the 2009 season. He ultimately shared quarterbacking duties with Adam Froman and future UTSA offensive coordinator Will Stein throughout the season and finished the year with 654 passing yards.

== Coaching career ==
Burke entered coaching as a recruiting intern at Alabama in 2011 until being hired as a graduate assistant at Louisville by his former head coach Charlie Strong later in the year. He became an offensive quality control assistant in 2013. Burke hired to the same position at Texas after Strong has hired as the Longhorns' head coach. He spent three seasons on the Longhorns' staff until Strong was fired in 2016.

Burke hired as the special teams coordinator and tight ends coach at South Florida in 2017, again following Strong. He was selected called plays for the Bulls in the 2018 Gasparilla Bowl following the departure of offensive coordinator Sterlin Gilbert.

Burke was hired as an offensive analyst at Texas-San Antonio (UTSA) in 2020. He was promoted to special teams coordinator and tight ends coach after two seasons. Burke was named co-offensive coordinator at the end of the 2022 after Will Stein was hired as the offensive coordinator at Oregon.

On January 9, 2026, Burke was officially announced as the new tight ends coach at the Kentucky under new head coach Will Stein.
