= Jenkins High School =

Public high school in Savannah, Georgia, United States

- Herschel Vespasian Jenkins High School

Location
- 1800 East Derenne Avenue; Savannah, Georgia 31406; United States; 32°01′21″N 81°04′58″W

Information
- Type: Public
- Opened: 1956 (70 years ago) (rebuilt 2021)
- School board: Savannah-Chatham County School Board
- School district: Savannah-Chatham County Public Schools
- CEEB code: 112682
- Principal: Heather Handy
- Teaching staff: 82.40 (FTE)
- Grades: 9-12
- Student to teacher ratio: 14.31
- Campus size: 1,179 (2023-2024)
- Colors: Crimson and silver
- Nickname: Warriors
- Accreditation: Southern Association of Colleges and Schools; Georgia Accrediting Commission
- Yearbook: The Sequoyah
- Website: jenkins.sccpss.com

Herschel Vespasian Jenkins High School, commonly known as Jenkins High School, is a public high school located in Savannah, Georgia, United States. A part of the Savannah-Chatham County Public Schools, it is accredited by the Southern Association of Colleges and Schools and the Georgia Accrediting Commission.

== Academics ==
Student enrollment is nearly 1,900 in grades 9-12, from the school's neighborhood attendance district, as well as from elsewhere in Chatham County through the Honors Academy for Academic Excellence.

Jenkins operates on a block schedule in which students take four courses over one semester, and four other courses over the next semester.

Senior students are eligible for the Joint Enrollment Program which partners with Armstrong Atlantic State University, Savannah Technical College, and Savannah State University. Joint Enrollment students take college core courses with free tuition. In addition, Jenkins offers AP courses, honors/advanced courses, and Project Lead the Way courses. PLTW was a program designed to instill technological learning into schools. The program was briefly interrupted during the 2006–07 school year, but was reinstated and continues to serve as the engineering-related school of the Savannah-Chatham County School System.

=== Honors Academy for Academic Excellence and Engineering Academy ===
The primary focus of this program is to provide higher-level courses to advanced students. Any student in Chatham County who meets program criteria is eligible to enroll at Jenkins.

== History ==
The school is named for the late, local philanthropist Herschel Vespasian Jenkins.

Jenkins was named a Blue Ribbon School in 1997 and a School of Excellence in 1998.

Beginning in the summer of 2019, the first of several phases to replace the school building in its entirety began. The new facility opened in August 2021. Hussey, Gay, Bell served as the design team for the project.

== Notable alumni ==
- Malik Benlevi, basketball player who plays professionally in New Zealand
- Tavion Gadson, college football defensive tackle for the Kentucky Wildcats
- Anthony Lanier, former NFL, current CFL defensive end
- Ben Patrick, former NFL tight end
- Ty Scott, NFL wide receiver for the Kansas City Chiefs
