= 2026 Southern Illinois Salukis football team =

American college football season

2026 Southern Illinois Salukis football
- Conference: Missouri Valley Football Conference
- Record: 5–7 (3–5 MVFC)
- Head coach: Nick Hill (11th season)
- Defensive coordinator: Lee Pronschinske (2nd season)
- Home stadium: Saluki Stadium

2026 Missouri Valley Football Conference standings
	Conf.			Overall
Team	W		L	W		L
No. 3 South Dakota State $^	7	–	1	10	–	2
No. 6 Youngstown State	6	–	2	8	–	3
No. 7 South Dakota	6	–	2	9	–	3
No. 10 North Dakota	5	–	3	8	–	4
No. 11 Illinois State	4	–	4	8	–	4
Southern Illinois	3	–	5	5	–	7
Northern Iowa	3	–	5	4	–	7
Murray State	2	–	6	3	–	9
Indiana State	0	–	8	2	–	10
$ – Conference champion; ^ – FCS playoff participant; As of November 22, 2026; Rankings from STATS Poll

The 2026 Southern Illinois Salukis football team represented Southern Illinois University Carbondale as a member of the Missouri Valley Football Conference (MVFC) during the 2026 NCAA Division I FCS football season. The Salukis were led by eleventh-year head coach Nick Hill, and played their home games at Saluki Stadium in Carbondale, Illinois.

== Preseason ==
=== MVFC poll ===
The Missouri Valley Football Conference released its preseason poll on July 14, 2026, voted on by league athletic directors, coaches, and media members. The Salukis were predicted to finish sixth in the conference.

== Schedule ==
Date	Time	Opponent	Rank	Site	TV	Result	Attendance
August 27	6:00 p.m.	at West Florida*	No. 16	Pen Air Field; Pensacola, FL	ESPN+	L 31–34	6,124
September 3	6:00 p.m.	at Samford*		Pete Hanna Stadium; Homewood, AL	ESPN+	W 22–18	6,713
September 12	6:00 p.m.	Southeast Missouri State*		Saluki Stadium; Carbondale, IL	ESPN+	W 34–20	12,310
September 19	1:00 p.m.	at Illinois*	No. 24	Gies Memorial Stadium; Champaign, IL	Peacock	L 10–48	60,670
September 26	6:00 p.m.	at Murray State	No. 24	Roy Stewart Stadium; Murray, KY	ESPN+	W 46–6	5,513
October 3	4:00 p.m.	No. 8 Youngstown State	No. 21	Saluki Stadium; Carbondale, IL	ESPN+	L 16–28	6,180
October 10	1:00 p.m.	at No. 10 South Dakota	No. 25	DakotaDome; Vermillion, SD	ESPN+	L 10–31	7,012
October 17	3:00 p.m.	No. 13 Illinois State^{†}		Saluki Stadium; Carbondale, IL	ESPNU	L 14–35	9,086
October 24	1:00 p.m.	No. 21 Northern Iowa		Saluki Stadium; Carbondale, IL	ESPN+	W 20–17	5,206
November 7	6:00 p.m.	at Indiana State		Memorial Stadium; Terre Haute, IN	ESPN+	W 37–20	3,247
November 14	1:00 p.m.	No. 4 South Dakota State		Saluki Stadium; Carbondale, IL	ESPN+	L 16–52	5,968
November 21	1:00 p.m.	at No. 10 North Dakota		Alerus Center; Grand Forks, ND	ESPN+	L 23–28	9,427
*Non-conference game; ^{†}Homecoming; Rankings from STATS Poll released prior to the game; All times are in Central time

== Rankings ==
Ranking movements Legend: ██ Increase in ranking ██ Decrease in ranking — = Not ranked RV = Received votes
	Week														
Poll	Pre	1	2	3	4	5	6	7	8	9	10	11	12	13	Final
STATS	16	RV	RV	24	24	21	25	RV	—	—	—	RV	—		
Coaches	16	25	RV	25	RV	25	RV	RV	—	RV	—	—	—		

== Game summaries ==
=== at West Florida ===
No. 16 Southern Illinois Salukis (0–0) at West Florida Argonauts (0–0) – Game summary

Quarter	1	2	3	4	Total
No. 16 Salukis	3	6	8	14	31
Argonauts	7	13	7	7	34

at Pen Air Field • Pensacola, Florida

- Date: August 27
- Game time: 6:00 p.m.
- Game weather: Sunny • Temperature: 86 °F (30 °C)
- Game attendance: 6,124
- Referee: Zach Erdmann
- TV announcers (ESPN+): Will Kennedy and Fred Robbins

Game information

First quarter

- SIU – Seth Adams 31-yard field goal, 5:30. Salukis 3–0. Drive: 10 plays, 60 yards, 5:02.
- UWF – Ty'ray Davis 45-yard run (Brogan Woeber kick), 1:13. Argonauts 7–3. Drive: 8 plays, 82 yards, 4:12.

Second quarter

- SIU – Seth Adams 50-yard field goal, 13:36. Argonauts 7–6. Drive: 9 plays, 45 yards, 2:31.
- UWF – Jakari Mozelle 19-yard pass from Ty'ray Davis (run failed), 9:48. Argonauts 13–6. Drive: 7 plays, 69 yards, 3:39.
- UWF – A'Khoury Lyde 44-yard interception return (Brogan Woeber kick), 4:40. Argonauts 20–6.
- SIU – Seth Adams 47-yard field goal, 0:08. Argonauts 20–9. Drive: 11 plays, 46 yards, 4:32.

Third quarter

- UWF – Markel Townsend 9-yard run (Brogan Woeber kick), 7:27. Argonauts 27–9. Drive: 8 plays, 77 yards, 4:43.
- SIU – Allen Middleton 18-yard pass from Jake Curry (Jake Curry–Lem Wash pass), 2:25. Argonauts 27–17. Drive: 7 plays, 61 yards, 3:09.

Fourth quarter

- SIU – Jake Curry 19-yard run (Seth Adams kick), 7:39. Argonauts 27–24. Drive: 8 plays, 63 yards, 4:25.
- UWF – Luc Carroll 22-yard pass from Ty'ray Davis (Brogan Woeber kick), 2:37. Argonauts 34–24. Drive: 6 plays, 43 yards, 3:45.
- SIU – Chandler Chapman 8-yard pass from Jake Curry (Seth Adams kick), 1:10. Argonauts 34–31. Drive: 9 plays, 73 yards, 1:21.

Statistics	SIU	UWF
First downs	22	16
Plays–yards	79–403	56–335
Rushes–yards	41–216	39–226
Passing yards	187	109
Passing: comp–att–int	17–38–3	7–17–0
Turnovers	4	3
Time of possession	32:37	27:23

Team	Category	Player	Statistics
Southern Illinois	Passing	Jake Curry	14/30, 168 yards, 2 TD, 3 INT
Southern Illinois	Rushing	Chandler Chapman	10 carries, 75 yards
Southern Illinois	Receiving	Allen Middleton	5 receptions, 60 yards, TD
West Florida	Passing	Ty'ray Davis	7/17, 109 yards, 2 TD
West Florida	Rushing	Ty'ray Davis	18 carries, 88 yards, TD
West Florida	Receiving	Jakari Mozelle	3 receptions, 40 yards, TD

=== at Samford ===
Southern Illinois Salukis (0–1) at Samford Bulldogs (0–1) – Game summary

Quarter	1	2	3	4	Total
Salukis	9	6	0	7	22
Bulldogs	0	7	8	3	18

at Pete Hanna Stadium • Homewood, Alabama

- Date: September 3
- Game time: 6:00 p.m.
- Game weather: Sunny • Temperature: 93 °F (34 °C)
- Game attendance: 6,713
- Referee: Bruce Austin
- TV: ESPN+

Game information

First quarter

- SIU – Karsen Konkel 2-yard pass from Jake Curry (Seth Adams kick), 10:47. Salukis 7–0. Drive: 8 plays, 75 yards, 4:13.
- SIU – Team safety, 7:48. Salukis 9–0.

Second quarter

- SAM – Cayden Aukerman 5-yard pass from Gabarri Johnson (Ty Ippolito kick), 8:13. Salukis 9–7. Drive: 8 plays, 71 yards, 4:02.
- SIU – Miles Marshall 7-yard pass from Jake Curry (pass failed), 0:34. Salukis 15–7. Drive: 9 plays, 46 yards, 3:30.

Third quarter

- SAM – Cayden Aukerman 5-yard pass from Gabarri Johnson (Gabarri Johnson–Cayden Aukerman pass), 2:18. Tied 15–15. Drive: 9 plays, 72 yards, 4:08.

Fourth quarter

- SIU – Lem Wash 3-yard run (Seth Adams kick), 10:50. Salukis 22–15. Drive: 4 plays, 23 yards, 2:13.
- SAM – Ty Ippolito 42-yard field goal, 6:42. Salukis 22–18. Drive: 12 plays, 50 yards, 4:08.

Statistics	SIU	SAM
First downs	18	15
Plays–yards	72–334	63–272
Rushes–yards	43–181	27–70
Passing yards	153	202
Passing: comp–att–int	13–29–0	21–36–1
Turnovers	0	1
Time of possession	32:34	27:26

Team	Category	Player	Statistics
Southern Illinois	Passing	Jake Curry	13/29, 153 yards, 2 TD
Southern Illinois	Rushing	Chandler Chapman	24 carries, 133 yards
Southern Illinois	Receiving	Markell Quick	3 receptions, 47 yards
Samford	Passing	Gabarri Johnson	20/35, 156 yards, 2 TD, INT
Samford	Rushing	Ken Cherry	7 carries, 44 yards
Samford	Receiving	Preston Bird	3 receptions, 63 yards

=== Southeast Missouri State ===
Southeast Missouri State Redhawks (1–1) at Southern Illinois Salukis (1–1) – Game summary

Quarter	1	2	3	4	Total
Redhawks	0	0	0	0	0
Salukis	0	0	0	0	0

at Saluki Stadium • Carbondale, Illinois

- Date: September 12
- Game time: 6:00 p.m.
- TV: ESPN+

Game information

First quarter
Second quarter
Third quarter
Fourth quarter

Statistics	SEMO	SIU
First downs		
Plays–yards		
Rushes–yards		
Passing yards		
Passing: comp–att–int		
Turnovers		
Time of possession		

Team	Category	Player	Statistics
Southeast Missouri State	Passing		
Southeast Missouri State	Rushing		
Southeast Missouri State	Receiving		
Southern Illinois	Passing		
Southern Illinois	Rushing		
Southern Illinois	Receiving		

=== at Illinois (FBS) ===
No. 24 Southern Illinois Salukis (2–1) at Illinois Fighting Illini (FBS) (1–1) – Game summary

Quarter	1	2	3	4	Total
No. 24 Salukis	7	3	0	0	10
Fighting Illini (FBS)	14	17	0	17	48

at Gies Memorial Stadium • Champaign, Illinois

- Date: September 19
- Game time: 1:00 p.m.
- Game weather: Cloudy • Temperature: 77 °F (25 °C) • Wind: SE at 3 miles per hour (4.8 km/h)
- Game attendance: 60,670
- Referee: Jason Gant
- TV announcers (Peacock): Paul Burmeister, Ian Book and Ashley ShahAhmadi

Game information

First quarter
Second quarter
Third quarter
Fourth quarter

Statistics	SIU	ILL
First downs	18	21
Plays–yards	69–257	57–503
Rushes–yards	27–29	28–198
Passing yards	228	305
Passing: comp–att–int	22–42–1	23–29–1
Turnovers	1	1
Time of possession	34:06	25:54

Team	Category	Player	Statistics
Southern Illinois	Passing	DJ Williams	20/38, 182 yards, TD, INT
Southern Illinois	Rushing	Jake Curry	4 carries, 22 yards
Southern Illinois	Receiving	Kyle Thomas	6 receptions, 77 yards
Illinois	Passing	Katin Houser	23/29, 305 yards, 2 TD, INT
Illinois	Rushing	Aidan Laughery	4 carries, 93 yards, TD
Illinois	Receiving	Collin Dixon	8 receptions, 131 yards, 2 TD

=== at Murray State ===
No. 24 Southern Illinois Salukis (2–2) at Murray State Racers (1–3) – Game summary

Quarter	1	2	3	4	Total
No. 24 Salukis	0	0	0	0	0
Racers	0	0	0	0	0

at Roy Stewart Stadium • Murray, Kentucky

- Date: September 26
- Game time: 6:00 p.m.
- TV: ESPN+

Game information

First quarter
Second quarter
Third quarter
Fourth quarter

Statistics	SIU	MUR
First downs		
Plays–yards		
Rushes–yards		
Passing yards		
Passing: comp–att–int		
Turnovers		
Time of possession		

Team	Category	Player	Statistics
Southern Illinois	Passing		
Southern Illinois	Rushing		
Southern Illinois	Receiving		
Murray State	Passing		
Murray State	Rushing		
Murray State	Receiving		

=== No. 8 Youngstown State ===
No. 8 Youngstown State Penguins (3–2) at No. 21 Southern Illinois Salukis (3–2) – Game summary

Quarter	1	2	3	4	Total
No. 8 Penguins	0	7	14	7	28
No. 21 Salukis	3	7	0	6	16

at Saluki Stadium • Carbondale, Illinois

- Date: October 3
- Game time: 4:00 p.m.
- Game weather: Sunny • Temperature: 75 °F (24 °C) • Wind: NE at 5 miles per hour (8.0 km/h)
- Game attendance: 6,180
- Referee: Carl Chapman
- TV announcers (ESPN+): Larry Larson (play-by-play) and Dominique Daffney (analyst)

Game information

First quarter

- (10:37) SIU – Seth Adams 44-yard field goal (Drive: 10 plays, 49 yards, 4:23; Southern Illinois 3–0)

Second quarter

- (11:27) YSU – Lynn Wyche-El 1-yard run, Andrew Lastovka kick (Drive: 9 plays, 84 yards, 4:00; Youngstown State 7–3)
- (7:57) SIU – DJ Williams 1-yard run, Weston Schofield kick (Drive: 8 plays, 75 yards, 3:30; Southern Illinois 10–7)

Third quarter

- (4:04) YSU – Beau Brungard 1-yard run, Andrew Lastovka kick (Drive: 11 plays, 61 yards, 6:06; Youngstown State 14–10)
- (2:42) YSU – Austin Bray 20-yard pass from Beau Brungard, Andrew Lastovka kick (Drive: 1 play, 20 yards, 0:09; Youngstown State 21–10)

Fourth quarter

- (3:37) YSU – Jaden Gilbert 8-yard run, Andrew Lastovka kick (Drive: 12 plays, 80 yards, 8:24; Youngstown State 28–10)
- (1:54) SIU – DJ Williams 14-yard run, DJ Williams conversion pass failed (Drive: 8 plays, 75 yards, 1:43; Youngstown State 28–16)

Statistics	YSU	SIU
First downs	23	24
Plays–yards	62–403	70–387
Rushes–yards	33–184	35–99
Passing yards	219	288
Passing: comp–att–int	20–29–2	19–35–1
Turnovers	2	2
Time of possession	30:26	29:34

Team	Category	Player	Statistics
Youngstown State	Passing	Beau Brungard	20/29, 219 yards, TD, 2 INT
Youngstown State	Rushing	Beau Brungard	16 carries, 69 yards, TD
Youngstown State	Receiving	Austin Bray	5 receptions, 78 yards, TD
Southern Illinois	Passing	DJ Williams	19/35, 288 yards, INT
Southern Illinois	Rushing	Chandler Chapman	11 carries, 49 yards
Southern Illinois	Receiving	Kyle Thomas	8 receptions, 155 yards

=== at No. 10 South Dakota ===
No. 25 Southern Illinois Salukis (3–3) at No. 10 South Dakota Coyotes (4–2) – Game summary

Quarter	1	2	3	4	Total
No. 25 Salukis	0	7	3	0	10
No. 10 Coyotes	7	7	3	14	31

at DakotaDome • Vermillion, South Dakota

- Date: October 10
- Game time: 1:00 p.m.
- Game weather: Indoors • Temperature: 70 °F (21 °C)
- Game attendance: 7,012
- Referee: Jason Perkins
- TV announcers (ESPN+): Jay Elsen (play-by-play) and Andre Fields (analyst)

Game information

First quarter

- (5:09) SDAK – Jackson Proctor 13-yard run, Ford Hamilton kick (Drive: 5 plays, 85 yards, 2:52; South Dakota 7–0)

Second quarter

- (8:36) SDAK – Tennel Bryant 56-yard pass from Austyn Modrzewski, Bohdie ing kick (Drive: 1 play, 56 yards, 0:09; South Dakota 14–0)
- (1:50) SIU – Kyle Thomas 7-yard pass from DJ Williams, Weston Schofield kick (Drive: 15 plays, 84 yards, 6:43; South Dakota 14–7)

Third quarter

- (8:36) SDAK – Bohdie Ing 31-yard field goal (Drive: 11 plays, 61 plays, 6:24; South Dakota 17–7)
- (3:36) SIU – Weston Schofield 26-yard field goal (Drive: 12 plays, 67 yards, 5:00; South Dakota 17–10)

Fourth quarter

- (14:09) SDAK – Tennel Bryant 44-yard run, Bohdie Ing kick (Drive: 7 plays, 75 yards, 4:27; South Dakota 24–10)
- (8:31) SDAK – Charles Pierre Jr. 12-yard run, Bohdie Ing kick (Drive: 6 plays, 58 yards, 2:52; South Dakota 31–10)

Statistics	SIU	SDAK
First downs	19	23
Plays–yards	65–277	55–486
Rushes–yards	36–98	34–218
Passing yards	179	268
Passing: comp–att–int	18–29–0	17–21–0
Turnovers	0	1
Time of possession	30:51	29:09

Team	Category	Player	Statistics
Southern Illinois	Passing	DJ Williams	18/29, 179 yards, TD
Southern Illinois	Rushing	Chandler Chapman	20 carries, 91 yards
Southern Illinois	Receiving	Allen Middleton	6 receptions, 64 yards
South Dakota	Passing	Austyn Modrzewski	16/20, 268 yards, TD
South Dakota	Rushing	Charles Pierre Jr.	15 carries, 138 yards, TD
South Dakota	Receiving	Brayden White	4 receptions, 84 yards

=== No. 13 Illinois State ===
No. 13 Illinois State Redbirds (4–2) at Southern Illinois Salukis (3–4) – Game summary

Quarter	1	2	3	4	Total
No. 13 Redbirds	0	0	0	0	0
Salukis	0	0	0	0	0

at Saluki Stadium • Carbondale, Illinois

- Date: October 17
- Game time: 3:00 p.m.
- TV: ESPNU

Game information

First quarter
Second quarter
Third quarter
Fourth quarter

Statistics	ILST	SIU
First downs		
Plays–yards		
Rushes–yards		
Passing yards		
Passing: comp–att–int		
Turnovers		
Time of possession		

Team	Category	Player	Statistics
Illinois State	Passing		
Illinois State	Rushing		
Illinois State	Receiving		
Southern Illinois	Passing		
Southern Illinois	Rushing		
Southern Illinois	Receiving		

=== No. 21 Northern Iowa ===
No. 21 Northern Iowa Panthers (3–3) at Southern Illinois Salukis (3–5) – Game summary

Quarter	1	2	3	4	Total
No. 21 Panthers	0	0	0	0	0
Salukis	0	0	0	0	0

at Saluki Stadium • Carbondale, Illinois

- Date: October 24
- Game time: 1:00 p.m.

Game information

First quarter
Second quarter
Third quarter
Fourth quarter

Statistics	UNI	SIU
First downs		
Plays–yards		
Rushes–yards		
Passing yards		
Passing: comp–att–int		
Turnovers		
Time of possession		

Team	Category	Player	Statistics
Northern Iowa	Passing		
Northern Iowa	Rushing		
Northern Iowa	Receiving		
Southern Illinois	Passing		
Southern Illinois	Rushing		
Southern Illinois	Receiving		

=== at Indiana State ===
Southern Illinois Salukis (4–5) at Indiana State Sycamores (2–7) – Game summary

Quarter	1	2	3	4	Total
Salukis	7	10	14	6	37
Sycamores	3	3	0	14	20

at Memorial Stadium • Terre Haute, Indiana

- Date: November 7
- Game time: 6:00 p.m.
- Game weather: Sunny
- Game attendance: 3,247
- Referee: John Shay
- TV announcers (ESPN+): Brian Jennings (play-by-play) and Austin Osborne (analyst)

Game information

First quarter

- INST – Sebastian Lopez 34-yard field goal, 10:43. Sycamores 3–0. Drive: 9 plays, 59 yards, 4:17.
- SIU – Kyle Thomas 57-yard pass from DJ Williams (Weston Schofield kick), 5:58. Salukis 7–3. Drive: 5 plays, 94 yards, 1:38.

Second quarter

- SIU – Seth Adams 50-yard field goal, 12:01. Salukis 10–3. Drive: 4 plays, 3 yards, 1:37.
- SIU – Kyle Thomas 18-yard pass from DJ Williams (Weston Schofield kick), 7:55. Salukis 17–3. Drive: 2 plays, 19 yards, 0:28.
- INST – Sebastian Lopez 41-yard field goal, 1:08. Salukis 17–6. Drive: 8 plays, 44 yards, 3:17.

Third quarter

- SIU – Markell Quick 25-yard pass from DJ Williams (Weston Schofield kick), 5:24. Salukis 24–6. Drive: 12 plays, 63 yards, 4:18.
- SIU – Kyle Thomas 7-yard pass from DJ Williams (Weston Schofield kick), 2:29. Salukis 31–6. Drive: 7 plays, 50 yards, 2:50.

Fourth quarter

- SIU – Weston Schofield 22-yard field goal, 13:33. Salukis 34–6. Drive: 9 plays, 44 yards, 3:51.
- INST – Zechariah Prince 99-yard run (Sebastian Lopez kick), 9:24. Salukis 34–13. Drive: 1 play, 99 yards, 0:15.
- INST – Torey French 29-yard pass from Brock Riddle (Sebastian Lopez kick), 5:15. Salukis 34–20. Drive: 4 plays, 73 yards, 1:56.
- SIU – Weston Schofield 23-yard field goal, 1:55. Salukis 37–20. Drive: 4 plays, 9 yards, 2:09.

Statistics	SIU	INST
First downs	18	10
Plays–yards	78–392	49–282
Rushes–yards	48–176	25–137
Passing yards	216	145
Passing: comp–att–int	17–30–0	16–24–2
Turnovers	0	3
Time of possession	36:00	24:00

Team	Category	Player	Statistics
Southern Illinois	Passing	DJ Williams	16/29, 211 yards, 4 TD
Southern Illinois	Rushing	Quade Chatmon	13 carries, 82 yards
Southern Illinois	Receiving	Kyle Thomas	7 receptions, 114 yards, 3 TD
Indiana State	Passing	Brock Riddle	3/4, 65 yards, TD
Indiana State	Rushing	Zechariah Prince	6 carries, 119 yards, TD
Indiana State	Receiving	Jayden Reed	4 receptions, 66 yards

=== No. 4 South Dakota State ===
No. 4 South Dakota State Jackrabbits (8–2) at Southern Illinois Salukis (5–5) – Game summary

Quarter	1	2	3	4	Total
No. 4 Jackrabbits	0	0	0	0	0
Salukis	0	0	0	0	0

at Saluki Stadium • Carbondale, Illinois

- Date: November 14
- Game time: 1:00 p.m.

Game information

First quarter
Second quarter
Third quarter
Fourth quarter

Statistics	SDST	SIU
First downs		
Plays–yards		
Rushes–yards		
Passing yards		
Passing: comp–att–int		
Turnovers		
Time of possession		

Team	Category	Player	Statistics
South Dakota State	Passing		
South Dakota State	Rushing		
South Dakota State	Receiving		
Southern Illinois	Passing		
Southern Illinois	Rushing		
Southern Illinois	Receiving		

=== at No. 10 North Dakota ===
Southern Illinois Salukis (5–6) at No. 10 North Dakota Fighting Hawks (7–4) – Game summary

Quarter	1	2	3	4	Total
Salukis	0	0	0	0	0
No. 10 Fighting Hawks	0	0	0	0	0

at Alerus Center • Grand Forks, North Dakota

- Date: November 21
- Game time: 1:00 p.m.

Game information

First quarter
Second quarter
Third quarter
Fourth quarter

Statistics	SIU	UND
First downs		
Plays–yards		
Rushes–yards		
Passing yards		
Passing: comp–att–int		
Turnovers		
Time of possession		

Team	Category	Player	Statistics
Southern Illinois	Passing		
Southern Illinois	Rushing		
Southern Illinois	Receiving		
North Dakota	Passing		
North Dakota	Rushing		
North Dakota	Receiving		
