= Tavion Gadson =

American football player

No. 94 – Kentucky Wildcats
- Position: Defensive tackle
- Class: Senior

Personal information
- Born: Savannah, Georgia, U.S.
- Listed height: 6 ft 5 in (1.96 m)
- Listed weight: 303 lb (137 kg)

Career information
- High school: Jenkins (Savannah, Georgia)
- College: Kentucky (2023–present)
- Stats at ESPN

Tavion Gadson is an American college football defensive tackle for the Kentucky Wildcats.

== Early life ==
Gadson was born in Savannah, Georgia. He attended Jenkins High School in Savannah where as a senior, he was the Region 1-5A Defensive Player of the Year after recording 40 tackles and five sacks. He originally committed to play college football at Florida State University before flipping his commitment to the University of Kentucky.

== College career ==
Gadson played in four games his first year at Kentucky in 2023 and redshirted. In 2024, he played in only one game after suffering a knee injury during the spring. In 2025, Gadson played in 11 games with one start and had 28 tackles and 2.5 sacks. He returned to Kentucky in 2026.
