= Kenny Darby =

American football player

No. 19 – Kentucky Wildcats
- Position: Wide receiver
- Class: Freshman

Personal information
- Born: Bossier City, Louisiana, U.S.
- Listed height: 6 ft 1 in (1.85 m)
- Listed weight: 180 lb (82 kg)

Career information
- High school: Airline (Bossier City, Louisiana)
- College: Kentucky (2026–present)
- Stats at ESPN

Kenny Ray Darby is an American college football wide receiver for the Kentucky Wildcats.

== Early life ==
Darby was born in Bossier City, Louisiana, and attended Airline High School. As a senior, he totaled 83 receptions for 1,124 yards and eight touchdowns while rushing for nine more touchdowns. After decommitting from LSU, Darby committed to the University of Kentucky to play college football.

== College career ==
Entering his freshman season, Darby was expected to play a significant role in the Wildcats' offense. In his collegiate debut against Youngstown State, he led the team in receiving with three receptions for 74 yards and a touchdown. Against South Carolina, in a 35-34 overtime victory, Darby caught a career-high 12 passes for 96 yards and a touchdown as the Wildcats rallied from a 17-0 deficit.

=== Statistics ===
Season	Team	GP	Receiving			
Season	Team	GP	Rec	Yds	Avg	TD
2026	Kentucky	7	34	436	12.8	3
Career		7	34	436	12.8	3
