= Grant Godfrey =

American football player

No. 22 – Kentucky Wildcats
- Position: Linebacker
- Class: Senior

Personal information
- Born: San Diego, California, U.S.
- Listed height: 6 ft 3 in (1.91 m)
- Listed weight: 240 lb (109 kg)

Career information
- High school: North Gwinnett (Suwanee, Georgia)
- College: Kentucky (2023–present)
- Stats at ESPN

Grant Godfrey is an American college football linebacker for the Kentucky Wildcats.

== Early life ==
Godfrey was born in San Diego, California. He attended North Gwinnett High School in Suwanee, Georgia, where as a junior, he had 68 tackles, six sacks, one interception and four fumble recoveries. As a four-star recruit by both 247Sports and ESPN, Godfrey committed to play college football at the University of Kentucky on August 1, 2022. In his senior season, he logged 69 tackles, including 11 for loss, seven sacks, one interception, one forced fumble and a blocked punt.

== College career ==
Godfrey redshirted his first season due to an injury. In 2024, he played in seven games, where he made nine tackles. The following season, Godfrey appeared in all 12 games, recording 34 tackles, including two for loss, and 0.5 sack. Prior to the start of the 2026 season, he was named a starter.

== Personal life ==
Godfrey's father, Randall Godfrey, played 11 years in the National Football League (NFL) at linebacker. His brother, RJ Godfrey, plays basketball for the Arizona Wildcats.
