= Kenny Minchey =

American football player (born 2005)

No. 3 – Kentucky Wildcats
- Position: Quarterback
- Class: Senior

Personal information
- Born: February 18, 2005 (age 21); Nashville, Tennessee, U.S.
- Listed height: 6 ft 2 in (1.88 m)
- Listed weight: 211 lb (96 kg)

Career information
- High school: Pope Saint John Paul II (Hendersonville, Tennessee)
- College: Notre Dame (2023–2025); Kentucky (2026–present)
- Stats at ESPN

Kennith Minchey Jr. (born February 18, 2005) is an American college football quarterback for the Kentucky Wildcats. He previously played for the Notre Dame Fighting Irish.

== Early life ==
Minchey was born on February 18, 2005 in Nashville, Tennessee. Minchey attended Pope Saint John Paul II Preparatory School in Hendersonville, Tennessee where as a junior, he threw for 3,280 yards and 32 touchdowns and was selected to participate in the 2022 Elite 11. Minchey originally verbally committed to play for the Pittsburgh Panthers, but he later decommitted. A four-star recruit, he committed to play college football at the University of Notre Dame.

== College career ==
Minchey played sparingly during his first two seasons at Notre Dame. Entering the 2025 season, he competed for the starting quarterback job with CJ Carr but ultimately lost. After spending the 2025 season as a backup, Minchey entered the transfer portal.

On January 4, 2026, Minchey announced his decision to transfer to the University of Nebraska–Lincoln, to play for the Nebraska Cornhuskers. However, the following day, he flipped his transfer commitment to the University of Kentucky to play for the Kentucky Wildcats. Prior to the start of the 2026 season, Minchey was named the Wildcats' starting quarterback. In his first career start against Youngstown State, he completed 18 passes for 301 yards and four touchdowns in a 45–13 victory.

=== Statistics ===
College statistics
Season	Team	Games			Passing								Rushing			
Season	Team	GP	GS	Record	Comp	Att	Pct	Yards	Avg	TD	Int	Rate	Att	Yards	Avg	TD
2023	Notre Dame	3	0	—	2	2	100.0	12	6.0	0	0	150.4	0	0	0.0	0
2024	Notre Dame	1	0	—	1	1	100.0	4	4.0	0	0	133.6	2	12	6.0	1
2025	Notre Dame	6	0	—	20	26	76.9	196	7.5	0	0	140.2	7	84	12.0	1
2026	Kentucky	8	8	7–1	160	232	69.0	1,755	7.6	14	2	152.0	44	38	0.9	2
Career		18	8	6–1	183	261	70.1	1,967	7.5	14	1	150.4	53	134	2.5	4
