= 2026 North Dakota Fighting Hawks football team =

American college football season

2026 North Dakota Fighting Hawks football
- Conference: Missouri Valley Football Conference

Ranking
- STATS: No. 10
- FCS Coaches: No. 11
- Record: 8–4 (5–3 MVFC)
- Head coach: Eric Schmidt (2nd season)
- Offensive coordinator: Danny Freund (6th season)
- Offensive scheme: Spread
- Base defense: 4–2–5
- Home stadium: Alerus Center

2026 Missouri Valley Football Conference standings
	Conf.			Overall
Team	W		L	W		L
No. 3 South Dakota State $^	7	–	1	10	–	2
No. 6 Youngstown State ^	6	–	2	8	–	3
No. 7 South Dakota ^	6	–	2	9	–	3
No. 10 North Dakota ^	5	–	3	8	–	4
No. 11 Illinois State ^	4	–	4	8	–	4
Southern Illinois	3	–	5	5	–	7
Northern Iowa	3	–	5	4	–	7
Murray State	2	–	6	3	–	9
Indiana State	0	–	8	2	–	10
$ – Conference champion; ^ – FCS playoff participant; As of November 22, 2026; Rankings from STATS Poll

The 2026 North Dakota Fighting Hawks football team represents the University of North Dakota as a member of the Missouri Valley Football Conference (MVFC) during the 2026 NCAA Division I FCS football season. The Fighting Hawks are led by second-year head coach Eric Schmidt, and play home games at Alerus Center in Grand Forks, North Dakota.

== Preseason ==
=== MVFC poll ===
The Missouri Valley Football Conference released its preseason poll on July 14, 2026, voted on by league athletic directors, coaches, and media members. The Fighting Hawks were predicted to finish fourth in the conference, but also received two first-place votes.

== Schedule ==
Date	Time	Opponent	Rank	Site	TV	Result	Attendance
August 27	7:00 p.m.	LIU*	No. 10	Alerus Center; Grand Forks, ND	Midco Sports/ESPN+	W 42–21	10,344
September 5	3:00 p.m.	St. Thomas*	No. 8	Alerus Center; Grand Forks, ND	Midco Sports/ESPN+	W 62–26	10,909
September 12	9:00 p.m.	at Portland State*	No. 6	Hillsboro Stadium; Hillsboro, OR	ESPN+	W 47–23	1,455
September 19	6:15 p.m.	at Nebraska*	No. 6	Memorial Stadium; Lincoln, NE	BTN	L 7–34	86,217
September 26	12:00 p.m.	at Indiana State	No. 7	Memorial Stadium; Terre Haute, IN	ESPN+	W 42–35	2,765
October 3	1:00 p.m.	Murray State^{†}	No. 5	Alerus Center; Grand Forks, ND	Midco Sports/ESPN+	W 55–28	10,985
October 10	4:00 p.m.	at Northern Iowa	No. 4	UNI-Dome; Cedar Falls, IA	ESPN+	L 17–24	11,487
October 17	1:00 p.m.	No. 1 South Dakota State	No. 11	Alerus Center; Grand Forks, ND	Midco Sports/ESPN+	W 21–10	12,922
October 24	1:00 p.m.	at No. 8 South Dakota	No. 6	DakotaDome; Vermillion, SD (Sitting Bull Trophy)	Midco Sports/ESPN+	L 23–26 ^{OT}	8,241
October 31	11:00 a.m.	at No. 4 Youngstown State	No. 9	Stambaugh Stadium; Youngstown, OH	ESPN+	L 28–31	9,415
November 7	1:00 p.m.	No. 10 Illinois State	No. 11	Alerus Center; Grand Forks, ND	Midco Sports/ESPN+	W 49–21	10,046
November 21	1:00 p.m.	Southern Illinois	No. 10	Alerus Center; Grand Forks, ND	Midco Sports/ESPN+	W 28–23	9,427
*Non-conference game; ^{†}Homecoming; Rankings from STATS Poll released prior to the game; All times are in Central time

== Game summaries ==
=== LIU ===
LIU Sharks (0–0) at No. 10 North Dakota Fighting Hawks (0–0) – Game summary

Quarter	1	2	3	4	Total
Sharks	0	0	14	7	21
No. 10 Fighting Hawks	22	20	0	0	42

at Alerus Center • Grand Forks, North Dakota

- Date: August 27
- Game time: 7:00 p.m. CDT
- Game weather: none (played indoors)
- Game attendance: 10,344
- Referee: David Hergert
- TV announcers (Midco Sports, ESPN+, Midco+): Alex Heinert and Ryan Kasowski

Game information

First quarter

- UND – Korey Tai 14-yard pass from Jerry Kaminski (Luke Silvernale kick), 10:34. Fighting Hawks 7–0. Drive: 11 plays, 75 yards, 4:19.
- UND – Matt Lawson 4-yard run (Hunter Kallstrom run), 7:57. Fighting Hawks 15–0. Drive: 4 plays, 26 yards, 1:22.
- UND – Nathan Hromadka 5-yard pass from Jerry Kaminski (Luke Silvernale kick), 4:40. Fighting Hawks 22–0. Drive: 7 plays, 74 yards, 2:54.

Second quarter

- UND – Caleb Goodloe 28-yard pass from Jerry Kaminski (Luke Silvernale kick), 10:44. Fighting Hawks 29–0. Drive: 4 plays, 39 yards, 1:37.
- UND – Charles Langama 13-yard run (Luke Silvernale kick), 8:55. Fighting Hawks 36–0. Drive: 4 plays, 36 yards, 0:54.
- UND – Matt Lawson 1-yard run (Luke Silvernale kick failed), 2:27. Fighting Hawks 42–0. Drive: 4 plays, 56 yards, 1:51.

Third quarter

- LIU – Tyselle Spencer 13-yard run (Will Johnson kick), 9:59. Fighting Hawks 42–7. Drive: 9 plays, 75 yards, 5:01.
- LIU – Boakai Veikei 65-yard pass from Luca Stanzani (Will Johnson kick), 0:13. Fighting Hawks 42–14. Drive: 2 plays, 80 yards, 0:38.

Fourth quarter

- LIU – Luca Stanzani 1-yard run (Will Johnson kick), 3:38. Fighting Hawks 42–21. Drive: 16 plays, 68 yards, 9:25.

Statistics	LIU	UND
First downs	13	25
Plays–yards	57–255	73–465
Rushes–yards	32–71	46–168
Passing yards	184	297
Passing: comp–att–int	15–25–1	20–27–1
Turnovers	2	1
Time of possession	28:13	31:47

Team	Category	Player	Statistics
LIU	Passing	Luca Stanzani	12/16, 173 yards, TD
LIU	Rushing	Nathan Gray	8 carries, 27 yards
LIU	Receiving	Boakai Veikei	1 reception, 65 yards, TD
North Dakota	Passing	Jerry Kaminski	17/21, 232 yards, 3 TD
North Dakota	Rushing	Charles Langama	12 carries, 51 yards, TD
North Dakota	Receiving	Caleb Goodloe	5 receptions, 118 yards, TD

=== St. Thomas (MN) ===
St. Thomas Tommies (1–0) at No. 8 North Dakota Fighting Hawks (1–0) – Game summary

Quarter	1	2	3	4	Total
Tommies	0	12	7	7	26
No. 8 Fighting Hawks	20	21	7	14	62

at Alerus Center • Grand Forks, North Dakota

- Date: September 5
- Game time: 3:00 p.m.
- Game weather: none (played indoors)
- Game attendance: 10,909
- Referee: Tyler Downs
- TV announcers (Midco/ESPN+): Alex Heinert (play-by-play) and Ryan Kasowski (analyst)

Game information

First quarter

- UND – Avery Dixon 34-yard interception return (Kenten Laughman kick), 14:10. Fighting Hawks 7–0.
- UND – Korey Tai 8-yard pass from Jerry Kaminski (Kenten Laughman kick), 6:13. Fighting Hawks 14–0. Drive: 10 plays, 95 yards, 4:25.
- UND – Deng Deng 6-yard pass from Jerry Kaminski (pass failed), 2:32. Fighting Hawks 20–0. Drive: 5 plays, 52 yards, 2:03.

Second quarter

- UND – Mason South 5-yard pass from Jerry Kaminski (Kenten Laughman kick), 12:47. Fighting Hawks 27–0. Drive: 5 plays, 69 yards, 2:03.
- STMN – Ben Hoiland 49-yard field goal, 8:57. Fighting Hawks 27–3. Drive: 4 plays, 2 yards, 0:52.
- UND – Korey Tai 11-yard pass from Jerry Kaminski (Kenten Laughman kick), 7:02. Fighting Hawks 34–3. Drive: 5 plays, 74 yards, 1:52.
- STMN – Malachi Boadi-Aboagye 74-yard interception return (Ben Hoiland kick failed), 4:41. Fighting Hawks 34–9.
- UND – Sam Strandell 6-yard pass from Jerry Kaminski (Kenten Laughman kick), 0:24. Fighting Hawks 41–9. Drive: 13 plays, 60 yards, 4:12.
- STMN – Ben Hoiland 40-yard field goal, 0:00. Fighting Hawks 41–12. Drive: 3 plays, 0 yards, 0:15.

Third quarter

- UND – Charles Langama 15-yard run (Kenten Laughman kick), 5:50. Fighting Hawks 48–12. Drive: 10 plays, 72 yards, 5:17.
- STMN – Patrick Wagner 27-yard pass from Nick Peipert (Ben Hoiland kick), 2:59. Fighting Hawks 48–19. Drive: 1 play, 27 yards, 0:06.

Fourth quarter

- UND – Griffin Broderick 1-yard run (Kenten Laughman kick), 13:10. Fighting Hawks 55–19. Drive: 10 plays, 47 yards, 4:42.
- STMN – Noah Long 1-yard run (Ben Hoiland kick), 11:21. Fighting Hawks 55–26. Drive: 4 plays, 75 yards, 1:49.
- UND – Javance Tupou'ata-Johnson 1-yard run (Kenten Laughman kick), 8:52. Fighting Hawks 62–26. Drive: 6 plays, 44 yards, 2:21.

Statistics	STMN	UND
First downs	14	27
Plays–yards	60–293	73–528
Rushes–yards	27–54	43–295
Passing yards	239	233
Passing: comp–att–int	17–33–1	23–30–2
Turnovers	1	3
Time of possession	29:10	30:50

Team	Category	Player	Statistics
St. Thomas (MN)	Passing	Anthony Policare	12/24, 128 yards, INT
St. Thomas (MN)	Rushing	Mordecai Ford	6 carries, 26 yards
St. Thomas (MN)	Receiving	Stefano Giovannelli	3 receptions, 75 yards
North Dakota	Passing	Jerry Kaminski	23/29, 233 yards, 5 TD, INT
North Dakota	Rushing	Charles Langama	11 carries, 120 yards, TD
North Dakota	Receiving	Deng Deng	4 receptions, 82 yards, TD

=== at Portland State ===
No. 6 North Dakota Fighting Hawks (2–0) at Portland State Vikings (0–2) – Game summary

Quarter	1	2	3	4	Total
No. 6 Fighting Hawks	14	12	0	21	47
Vikings	0	8	8	7	23

at Hillsboro Stadium • Hillsboro, Oregon

- Date: September 12
- Game time: 9:00 p.m.
- Game weather: Cloudy • Temperature: 59 °F (15 °C) • Wind: NE at 6 miles per hour (9.7 km/h)
- Game attendance: 1,455
- Referee: Robert Quello
- TV announcers (ESPN+): Matt Richert (play-by-play), Scott Hermo (analyst) and Grace Peterson (sideline)

Game information

First quarter

- (11:27) UND – Mason South 11-yard pass from Jerry Kaminski (Drive: 8 plays, 68 yards, 3:27; North Dakota 6–0)
- (4:01) UND – Tray Kuntz 1-yard pass from Jerry Kaminski, Deng Deng pass (Drive: 8 plays, 75 yards, 4:03; North Dakota 14–0)

Second quarter

- (9:35) UND – Kenton Laughman 38-yard field goal (Drive: 10 plays, 60 yards, 3:56; North Dakota 17–0)
- (4:14) PRST – Tanner Beaman 7-yard pass from Gabe Downing, Tanner Beaman pass (Drive: 4 plays, 54 yards, 2:03; North Dakota 17–8)
- (3:59) UND – Charles Langama 99-yard kickoff return, Kenten Laughman kick (North Dakota 24–8)
- (0:26) UND – 0-yard safety (North Dakota 26–8)

Third quarter

- (1:38) PRST – Cru Newman 2-yard pass from Gabe Downing, Tanner Beaman pass (Drive: 11 plays, 80 yards, 5:03; North Dakota 26–16)

Fourth quarter

- (14:20) UND – Matt Lawson 26-yard run, Kenten Laughman kick (Drive: 5 plays, 80 yards, 2:13; North Dakota 33–16)
- (12:04) UND – Korey Tai 74-yard pass from Jerry Kaminski, Kenten Laughman kick (Drive: 3 plays, 99 yards, 1:06; North Dakota 40–16)
- (10:01) UND – Javance Tupou'ata-Johnson 10-yard run, Kenten Laughman kick (Drive: 2 plays, 14 yards, 0:47; North Dakota 47–16)
- (6:29) PRST – Darius Bailey 39-yard pass from Gabe Downing, Joshua Hossmann Lees kick (Drive: 9 plays, 75 yards, 3:32; North Dakota 47–23)

Statistics	UND	PRST
First downs	28	20
Plays–yards	68–627	68–344
Rushes–yards	39–291	29–111
Passing yards	336	233
Passing: comp–att–int	21–29–1	23–39–0
Turnovers	1	1
Time of possession	29:47	30:13

Team	Category	Player	Statistics
North Dakota	Passing	Jerry Kaminski	21/29, 336 yards, 3 TD, INT
North Dakota	Rushing	Charles Langama	6 carries, 83 yards
North Dakota	Receiving	Korey Tai	4 receptions, 140 yards, TD
Portland State	Passing	Gabe Downing	23/39, 233 yards, 3 TD
Portland State	Rushing	Delon Thompson	14 carries, 58 yards
Portland State	Receiving	Terence Loville	3 receptions, 71 yards

=== at Nebraska (FBS) ===
No. 6 North Dakota Fighting Hawks (3–0) at Nebraska Cornhuskers (FBS) (2–0) – Game summary

Quarter	1	2	3	4	Total
No. 6 Fighting Hawks	0	0	7	0	7
Cornhuskers (FBS)	14	3	7	10	34

at Memorial Stadium • Lincoln, Nebraska

- Date: September 19
- Game time: 6:15 p.m.
- Game weather: Cloudy, 75 degrees, Wind North @ 8 mph
- Game attendance: 86,217
- Referee: Francisco Villar
- TV announcers (BTN): Jason Ross Jr., Anthony Herron and Bridget Howard

Game information

First quarter

- (10:31) NEB – Anthony Colandrea 10-yard rush (Kyle Cunanan kick) (Drive: 10 plays, 75 yards, 04:29, Nebraska 7–0)
- (0:54) NEB – Jamal Rule 3-yard rush (Kyle Cunanan kick) (Drive: 11 plays, 90 yards, 05:54, Nebraska 14–0)

Second quarter

- (0:36) NEB – Kyle Cunanan 32-yard field goal (Drive: 9 plays, 71 yards, 03:21, Nebraska 17–0)

Third quarter

- (13:57) NEB - Jamal Rule 55-yard rush (Kyle Cunanan kick) (Drive: 1 play, 55 yards, 00:11, Nebraska 24-0)
- (5:49) UND - Caleb Goodloe 7-yard pass from Jerry Kaminski (Kenten Laaughman kick) (Drive: 12 plays, 62 yards, 04:46, Nebraska 24-7)

Fourth quarter

- (14:55) NEB – Quinn Clark 5-yard pass from Anthony Colandrea (Kyle Cunanan kick) (Drive: 11 plays, 75 yards, 05:54, Nebraska 31-7)
- (1:51) NEB – Kyle Cunanan 40-yard field goal (Drive: 6 plays, 36 yards, 02:25, Nebraska 34-7)

Statistics	UND	NEB
First downs	10	22
Plays–yards	55–205	71–493
Rushes–yards	36–99	45–277
Passing yards	106	216
Passing: comp–att–int	9–19–0	18–26–0
Turnovers	0	0
Time of possession	24:15	35:45

Team	Category	Player	Statistics
North Dakota	Passing	Jerry Kaminski	9/18, 106 yards, TD
North Dakota	Rushing	Jerry Kaminski	14 carries, 48 yards
North Dakota	Receiving	Deng Deng	4 receptions, 59 yards
Nebraska	Passing	Anthony Colandrea	15/21, 195 yards, TD
Nebraska	Rushing	Jamal Rule	15 carries, 119 yards, 2 TD
Nebraska	Receiving	Kwazi Gilmer	3 receptions, 42 yards

=== at Indiana State ===
No. 7 North Dakota Fighting Hawks (3–1) at Indiana State Sycamores (2–2) – Game summary

Quarter	1	2	3	4	Total
No. 7 Fighting Hawks	7	21	0	14	42
Sycamores	7	7	7	14	35

at Memorial Stadium • Terre Haute, Indiana

- Date: September 26
- Game time: 1:00 p.m.
- Game weather: Sunny • Temperature: 73 °F (23 °C)
- Game attendance: 2,765
- Referee: Jason Perkins
- TV announcers (ESPN+): Brian Jennings (play-by-play) and Austin Osborn (analyst)

Game information

First quarter

- UND – Korey Tai 14-yard pass from Jerry Kaminski (Kenten Laughman kick), 8:50. Fighting Hawks 7–0. Drive: 14 plays, 80 yards, 5:54.
- INST – Jayden Reed 20-yard pass from Brady Allen (Sebastian Lopez kick), 5:41. Tied 7–7. Drive: 9 plays, 75 yards, 3:18.

Second quarter

- UND – Jerry Kaminski 9-yard run (Kenten Laughman kick), 14:14. Fighting Hawks 14–7. Drive: 7 plays, 62 yards, 2:42.
- UND – Mason South 6-yard pass from Jerry Kaminski (Kenten Laughman kick), 9:30. Fighting Hawks 21–7. Drive: 8 plays, 59 yards, 2:49.
- INST – Jaylan Johnson 17-yard pass from Brady Allen (Sebastian Lopez kick), 6:57. Fighting Hawks 21–14. Drive: 7 plays, 73 yards, 2:27.
- UND – Cameron Weir 13-yard pass from Jerry Kaminski (Kenten Laughman kick), 0:41. Fighting Hawks 28–14. Drive: 11 plays, 55 yards, 3:26.

Third quarter

- INST – Aaron Ball 10-yard run (Sebastian Lopez kick), 3:22. Fighting Hawks 28–21. Drive: 3 plays, 57 yards, 1:05.

Fourth quarter

- UND – Jerry Kaminski 1-yard run (Kenten Laughman kick), 13:02. Fighting Hawks 35–21. Drive: 11 plays, 81 yards, 4:00.
- UND – Cameron Weir 39-yard pass from Jerry Kaminski (Kenten Laughman kick), 9:37. Fighting Hawks 42–21. Drive: 6 plays, 82 yards, 2:02.
- INST – Jayden Reed 33-yard pass from Brady Allen (Sebastian Lopez kick), 8:01. Fighting Hawks 42–28. Drive: 4 plays, 55 yards, 1:36.
- INST – BJ Wuest 17-yard pass from Brady Allen (Sebastian Lopez kick), 6:36. Fighting Hawks 42–35. Drive: 5 plays, 47 yards, 1:24.

Statistics	UND	INST
First downs	29	19
Plays–yards	90–530	61–314
Rushes–yards	42–149	28–44
Passing yards	381	270
Passing: comp–att–int	33–48–0	18–33–0
Turnovers	1	1
Time of possession	36:52	23:08

Team	Category	Player	Statistics
North Dakota	Passing	Jerry Kaminski	33/48, 381 yards, 4 TD
North Dakota	Rushing	Jerry Kaminski	18 carries, 86 yards, 2 TD
North Dakota	Receiving	Deng Deng	6 receptions, 101 yards
Indiana State	Passing	Brady Allen	18/33, 270 yards, 4 TD
Indiana State	Rushing	Aaron Ball	16 carries, 50 yards, TD
Indiana State	Receiving	Jayden Reed	8 receptions, 129 yards, 2 TD

=== Murray State ===
Murray State Racers (1–4) at No. 5 North Dakota Fighting Hawks (4–1) – Game summary

Quarter	1	2	3	4	Total
Racers	0	0	0	0	0
No. 5 Fighting Hawks	0	0	0	0	0

at Alerus Center • Grand Forks, North Dakota

- Date: October 3
- Game time: 1:00 p.m.

Game information

First quarter
Second quarter
Third quarter
Fourth quarter

Statistics	MUR	UND
First downs		
Plays–yards		
Rushes–yards		
Passing yards		
Passing: comp–att–int		
Turnovers		
Time of possession		

Team	Category	Player	Statistics
Murray State	Passing		
Murray State	Rushing		
Murray State	Receiving		
North Dakota	Passing		
North Dakota	Rushing		
North Dakota	Receiving		

=== at Northern Iowa ===
No. 4 North Dakota Fighting Hawks (5–1) at Northern Iowa Panthers (2–2) – Game summary

Quarter	1	2	3	4	Total
No. 4 Fighting Hawks	0	0	0	0	0
Panthers	0	0	0	0	0

at UNI-Dome • Cedar Falls, Iowa

- Date: October 10
- Game time: 4:00 p.m.

Game information

First quarter
Second quarter
Third quarter
Fourth quarter

Statistics	UND	UNI
First downs		
Plays–yards		
Rushes–yards		
Passing yards		
Passing: comp–att–int		
Turnovers		
Time of possession		

Team	Category	Player	Statistics
North Dakota	Passing		
North Dakota	Rushing		
North Dakota	Receiving		
Northern Iowa	Passing		
Northern Iowa	Rushing		
Northern Iowa	Receiving		

=== No. 1 South Dakota State ===
No. 1 South Dakota State Jackrabbits (5–1) at No. 11 North Dakota Fighting Hawks (5–2) – Game summary

Quarter	1	2	3	4	Total
No. 1 Jackrabbits	0	0	0	0	0
No. 11 Fighting Hawks	0	0	0	0	0

at Alerus Center • Grand Forks, North Dakota

- Date: October 17
- Game time: 1:00 p.m.

Game information

First quarter
Second quarter
Third quarter
Fourth quarter

Statistics	SDST	UND
First downs		
Plays–yards		
Rushes–yards		
Passing yards		
Passing: comp–att–int		
Turnovers		
Time of possession		

Team	Category	Player	Statistics
South Dakota State	Passing		
South Dakota State	Rushing		
South Dakota State	Receiving		
North Dakota	Passing		
North Dakota	Rushing		
North Dakota	Receiving		

=== at No. 8 South Dakota (Sitting Bull Trophy) ===
No. 6 North Dakota Fighting Hawks (6–2) at No. 8 South Dakota Coyotes (6–2) – Game summary

Quarter	1	2	3	4	OT	Total
No. 6 Fighting Hawks	0	3	7	10	3	23
No. 8 Coyotes	17	3	0	0	6	26

at DakotaDome • Vermillion, South Dakota

- Date: October 24
- Game time: 1:00 p.m.
- Game weather: Indoors; 71 °F (22 °C)
- Game attendance: 8,241
- Referee: John Shay
- TV announcers (ESPN+): Jay Elsen (play-by-play) and Andre Fields (analyst)

Game information

First quarter

- (10:48) SDAK – Bohdie Ing 47-yard field goal (Drive: 9 plays, 46 yards, 4:12; South Dakota 3–0)
- (4:34) SDAK – Jackson Proctor 4-yard run, Bohdie Ing kick (Drive: 8 plays, 87 yards, 4:24; South Dakota 10–0)
- (1:32) SDAK – Tysen Boze 4-yard pass from Austyn Modrzewski, Bohdie Ing kick (Drive: 4 plays, 20 yards, 1:37; South Dakota 17–0)

Second quarter

- (12:26) UND – Kenten Laughman 46-yard field goal (Drive: 9 plays, 46 yards, 4:06; South Dakota 17–3)
- (1:44) SDAK – Bohdie Ing 46-yard field goal (Drive: 10 plays, 62 yards, 5:40; South Dakota 20–3)

Third quarter

- (7:32) UND – Javance Tupou'ata-Johnson 1-yard run, Kenten Laughman kick (Drive: 15 plays, 78 yards, 7:24; South Dakota 20–10)

Fourth quarter

- (3:57) UND – Matt Lawson 1-yard run, Kenten Laughman kick (Drive: 10 plays, 87 yards, 3:45; South Dakota 20–17)
- (0:45) UND – Kenten Laughman 45-yard field goal (Drive: 9 plays, 57 yards, 0:57; Tied 20–20)

Overtime

- UND – Kenten Laughman 38-yard field goal (Drive: 5 plays, 4 yards; North Dakota 23–20)
- SDAK – Brayden White 14-yard pass from Austyn Modrzewski (Drive: 2 plays, 25 yards; South Dakota 26–23)

Statistics	UND	SDAK
First downs	20	18
Plays–yards	74–363	67–324
Rushes–yards	28–112	44–164
Passing yards	251	160
Passing: comp–att–int	25–46–0	16–23–0
Turnovers	2	0
Time of possession	27:21	32:39

Team	Category	Player	Statistics
North Dakota	Passing	Jerry Kaminski	25/46, 251 yards
North Dakota	Rushing	Matt Lawson	10 carries, 46 yards, TD
North Dakota	Receiving	Deng Deng	8 receptions, 88 yards
South Dakota	Passing	Austyn Modrzewski	15/22, 159 yards, 2 TD
South Dakota	Rushing	Charles Pierre Jr.	21 carries, 128 yards
South Dakota	Receiving	Brayden White	6 receptions, 101 yards, TD

=== at No. 4 Youngstown State ===
No. 9 North Dakota Fighting Hawks (6–3) at No. 4 Youngstown State Penguins (6–2) – Game summary

Quarter	1	2	3	4	Total
No. 9 Fighting Hawks	13	8	7	0	28
No. 4 Penguins	7	0	14	10	31

at Stambaugh Stadium • Youngstown, Ohio

- Date: October 31
- Game time: 11:00 a.m.
- Game weather: Sunny • Temperature: 53 °F (12 °C) • Wind: SE at 5 miles per hour (8.0 km/h)
- Game attendance: 9,415
- Referee: Grant Henderson
- TV announcers (ESPN+): Anthony Romo (play-by-play) and Braylon Heard (analyst)

Game information

First quarter

- (11:19) YSU – Lynn Wyche-El 49-yard pass from Beau Brungard, Andrew Lastovka kick (Drive: 8 plays, 84 yards, 3:34; Youngstown State 7–0)
- (7:53) UND – Haydn Stay 6-yard pass from Jerry Kaminski, Kenten Laughman kick blocked (Drive: 9 plays, 75 yards, 3:26; Youngstown State 7–6)
- (5:44) UND – Charles Langama 2-yard run, Kenten Laughman kick (Drive: 4 plays, 34 yards, 1:41; North Dakota 13–7)

Second quarter

- (7:03) UND – Jerry Kaminski 9-yard pass from Javance Tupou'ata-Johnson, Samuel Kline pass for two-point conversion (Drive: 19 plays, 91 yards, 8:55; North Dakota 21–7)

Third quarter

- (13:25) YSU – Jaden Gilbert 5-yard run, Andrew Lastovka kick (Drive: 2 plays, 7 yards, 0:38; North Dakota 21–14)
- (8:33) UND – Jerry Kaminski 11-yard run, Kenten Laughman kick (Drive: 9 plays, 75 yards, 4:52; North Dakota 28–14)
- (2:09) YSU – Lynn Wyche-El 15-yard pass from Beau Brungard, Andrew Lastovka kick (Drive: 10 plays, 58 yards, 3:36; North Dakota 28–21)

Fourth quarter

- (10:28) YSU – Andrew Lastovka 37-yard field goal (Drive: 9 plays, 70 yards, 3:21; North Dakota 28–24)
- (2:04) YSU – Lynn Wyche-El 20-yard pass from Beau Brungard, Andrew Lastovka kick (Drive: 12 plays, 86 yards, 6:09; Youngstown State 31–28)

Statistics	UND	YSU
First downs	23	21
Plays–yards	70–367	67–453
Rushes–yards	36–163	38–185
Passing yards	204	268
Passing: comp–att–int	19–34–2	19–29–0
Turnovers	2	1
Time of possession	30:24	29:36

Team	Category	Player	Statistics
North Dakota	Passing	Jerry Kaminski	18/33, 195 yards, TD, 2 INT
North Dakota	Rushing	Matt Lawson	17 carries, 99 yards
North Dakota	Receiving	Deng Deng	7 receptions, 84 yards
Youngstown State	Passing	Beau Brungard	19/29, 268 yards, TD
Youngstown State	Rushing	Jaden Gilbert	13 carries, 68 yards, TD
Youngstown State	Receiving	Lynn Wyche-El	6 receptions, 148 yards, 3 TD

=== No. 10 Illinois State ===
No. 10 Illinois State Redbirds (7–2) at No. 11 North Dakota Fighting Hawks (6–4) – Game summary

Quarter	1	2	3	4	Total
No. 10 Redbirds	0	0	0	0	0
No. 11 Fighting Hawks	0	0	0	0	0

at Alerus Center • Grand Forks, North Dakota

- Date: November 7
- Game time: 1:00 p.m.
- TV: ESPN+

Game information

First quarter
Second quarter
Third quarter
Fourth quarter

Statistics	ILST	UND
First downs		
Plays–yards		
Rushes–yards		
Passing yards		
Passing: comp–att–int		
Turnovers		
Time of possession		

Team	Category	Player	Statistics
Illinois State	Passing		
Illinois State	Rushing		
Illinois State	Receiving		
North Dakota	Passing		
North Dakota	Rushing		
North Dakota	Receiving		

=== Southern Illinois ===
Southern Illinois Salukis (5–6) at No. 10 North Dakota Fighting Hawks (7–4) – Game summary

Quarter	1	2	3	4	Total
Salukis	0	0	0	0	0
No. 10 Fighting Hawks	0	0	0	0	0

at Alerus Center • Grand Forks, North Dakota

- Date: November 21
- Game time: 1:00 p.m.

Game information

First quarter
Second quarter
Third quarter
Fourth quarter

Statistics	SIU	UND
First downs		
Plays–yards		
Rushes–yards		
Passing yards		
Passing: comp–att–int		
Turnovers		
Time of possession		

Team	Category	Player	Statistics
Southern Illinois	Passing		
Southern Illinois	Rushing		
Southern Illinois	Receiving		
North Dakota	Passing		
North Dakota	Rushing		
North Dakota	Receiving		

== Rankings ==
Ranking movements Legend: ██ Increase in ranking ██ Decrease in ranking т = Tied with team above or below
	Week														
Poll	Pre	1	2	3	4	5	6	7	8	9	10	11	12	13	Final
STATS	10	8	6	6	7	5	4	11	6	9	11	11	10		
Coaches	10	9	7	6	8	7	7	15	8	11	15	12т	11		
