= 2026 Murray State Racers football team =

American college football season

2026 Murray State Racers football
- Conference: Missouri Valley Football Conference
- Record: 3–9 (2–6 MVFC)
- Head coach: Jody Wright (3rd season)
- Co-offensive coordinators: Jimmy Ogle (3rd season); Jack Walker (1st season)
- Defensive coordinator: Kirk Botkin (2nd season)
- Home stadium: Roy Stewart Stadium

2026 Missouri Valley Football Conference standings
	Conf.			Overall
Team	W		L	W		L
No. 3 South Dakota State $^	7	–	1	10	–	2
No. 6 Youngstown State	6	–	2	8	–	3
No. 7 South Dakota	6	–	2	9	–	3
No. 10 North Dakota	5	–	3	8	–	4
No. 11 Illinois State	4	–	4	8	–	4
Southern Illinois	3	–	5	5	–	7
Northern Iowa	3	–	5	4	–	7
Murray State	2	–	6	3	–	9
Indiana State	0	–	8	2	–	10
$ – Conference champion; ^ – FCS playoff participant; As of November 22, 2026; Rankings from STATS Poll

The 2026 Murray State Racers football team represented Murray State University as a member of the Missouri Valley Football Conference (MVFC) during the 2026 NCAA Division I FCS football season. The Racers were led by third-year head coach Jody Wright and played their home games at Roy Stewart Stadium in Murray, Kentucky.

== Preseason ==
=== MVFC poll ===
The Missouri Valley Football Conference released its preseason poll on July 14, 2026, voted on by league athletic directors, coaches, and media members. The Racers were predicted to finish last in the conference.

== Schedule ==
Date	Time	Opponent	Site	TV	Result	Attendance
August 27	6:00 p.m.	Eastern Illinois*	Roy Stewart Stadium; Murray, KY	ESPN+	L 14–28	5,671
September 5	6:00 p.m.	at Middle Tennessee*	Johnny "Red" Floyd Stadium; Murfreesboro, TN	ESPN+	L 14–38	16,227
September 12	6:00 p.m.	Valparaiso*	Roy Stewart Stadium; Murray, KY	ESPN+	W 27–18	11,122
September 19	6:00 p.m.	at Oklahoma State*	Boone Pickens Stadium; Stillwater, OK	ESPN+	L 0–59	52,168
September 26	6:00 p.m.	No. 24 Southern Illinois	Roy Stewart Stadium; Murray, KY	ESPN+	L 6–46	5,513
October 3	1:00 p.m.	at No. 5 North Dakota	Alerus Center; Grand Forks, ND	ESPN+	L 28–55	10,985
October 17	4:00 p.m.	No. 9 South Dakota^{†}	Roy Stewart Stadium; Murray, KY	ESPN+	L 20–48	14,100
October 24	2:00 p.m.	at No. 5 South Dakota State	Dana J. Dykhouse Stadium; Brookings, SD	ESPN+	L 9–42	19,302
October 31	1:00 p.m.	at No. 10 Illinois State	Hancock Stadium; Normal, IL	ESPN+	L 14–35	6,083
November 7	1:00 p.m.	No. 4 Youngstown State	Roy Stewart Stadium; Murray, KY	ESPN+	L 35–62	3,567
November 14	12:00 p.m.	at Indiana State	Memorial Stadium; Terre Haute, IN	ESPN+	W 44–14	2,666
November 21	1:00 p.m.	Northern Iowa	Roy Stewart Stadium; Murray, KY	ESPN+	W 51–14	4,213
*Non-conference game; ^{†}Homecoming; Rankings from STATS Poll released prior to the game; All times are in Central time; Source:

== Game summaries ==
=== Eastern Illinois ===
Eastern Illinois Panthers (0–0) at Murray State Racers (0–0) – Game summary

Quarter	1	2	3	4	Total
Panthers	0	14	7	7	28
Racers	0	14	0	0	14

at Roy Stewart Stadium • Murray, Kentucky

- Date: August 27
- Game time: 6:00 p.m.
- Game weather: Sunny • Temperature: 85 °F (29 °C) • Wind: SE at 5 miles per hour (8.0 km/h)
- Game attendance: 5,671
- Referee: Gregory Gompf
- TV announcers (ESPN+): Rob Cross and Drayton Charlton-Perrin

Game information
First quarter
- No scoring plays.

Second quarter

- MUR – Jaxon Potter 13-yard pass from Collin Shannon (Tyler Dorn kick failed), 14:29. Racers 6–0. Drive: 2 plays, 40 yards, 0:23.
- EIU – Charles Kellom 10-yard run (Drew Schiller kick), 9:36. Panthers 7–6. Drive: 4 plays, 33 yards, 1:59.
- EIU – Charles Kellom 88-yard run (Drew Schiller kick), 0:58. Panthers 14–6. Drive: 1 play, 88 yards, 0:14.
- MUR – Trey Firestone 7-yard pass from Collin Shannon (Trey Firestone–Brooks Kleinpeter pass), 0:00. Tied 14–14. Drive: 9 plays, 73 yards, 0:53.

Third quarter

- EIU – Charles Kellom 2-yard run (Drew Schiller kick), 9:05. Panthers 21–14. Drive: 8 plays, 63 yards, 4:28.

Fourth quarter

- EIU – Landers Green 20-yard pass from Cole LaCrue (Drew Schiller kick), 8:25. Panthers 28–14. Drive: 8 plays, 76 yards, 4:38.

Statistics	EIU	MUR
First downs	20	18
Plays–yards	65–368	66–320
Rushes–yards	47–267	26–63
Passing yards	101	257
Passing: comp–att–int	11–18–0	26–40–2
Turnovers	0	2
Time of possession	33:11	26:49

Team	Category	Player	Statistics
Eastern Illinois	Passing	Cole LaCrue	11/18, 101 yards, TD
Eastern Illinois	Rushing	Charles Kellom	19 carries, 171 yards, 3 TD
Eastern Illinois	Receiving	Samuel Gonzalez	3 receptions, 50 yards
Murray State	Passing	Collin Shannon	26/40, 257 yards, 2 TD, 2 INT
Murray State	Rushing	Mykel Allen	10 carries, 54 yards
Murray State	Receiving	Tyrell Campbell	5 receptions, 66 yards

=== at Middle Tennessee (FBS) ===
Murray State Racers (0–1) at Middle Tennessee Blue Raiders (FBS) (0–0) – Game summary

Quarter	1	2	3	4	Total
Racers	0	7	7	0	14
Blue Raiders (FBS)	14	7	3	14	38

at Johnny "Red" Floyd Stadium • Murfreesboro, Tennessee

- Date: September 5
- Game time: 6:00 p.m.
- Game weather: Cloudy • Temperature: 96 °F (36 °C) • Wind: NW at 5 miles per hour (8.0 km/h)
- Game attendance: 16,227
- Referee: Douglas Mercer
- TV announcers (ESPN+): Jake Rose, Jeremy Kellem and Jill Jelnick

Game information
First quarter
- MTSU – Neo Clifton 10-yard pass from Roman Gagliano (Dominic Bourgeois kick), 5:46. Blue Raiders 7–0. Drive: 6 plays, 56 yards, 3:50.
- MTSU – Cam'ron Lacy 22-yard pass from Roman Gagliano (Dominic Bourgeois kick), 0:22. Blue Raiders 14–0. Drive: 6 plays, 53 yards, 3:03.

Second quarter

- MUR – Tyrell Campbell 46-yard run (Rocco Devita kick), 7:18. Blue Raiders 14–7. Drive: 9 plays, 84 yards, 3:41.
- MTSU – Roman Gagliano 22-yard run (Dominic Bourgeois kick), 3:34. Blue Raiders 21–7. Drive: 7 plays, 75 yards, 3:44.

Third quarter

- MTSU – Dominic Bourgeois 45-yard field goal, 11:17. Blue Raiders 24–7. Drive: 6 plays, 32 yards, 2:45.
- MUR – Jawaun Northington 1-yard run (Rocco Devita kick), 4:47. Blue Raiders 24–14. Drive: 11 plays, 79 yards, 6:27.

Fourth quarter

- MTSU – Terrence Brown 15-yard run (Dominic Bourgeois kick), 14:53. Blue Raiders 31–14. Drive: 9 plays, 71 yards, 4:43.
- MTSU – Kalen Woods 39-yard fumble return (Dominic Bourgeois kick), 13:45. Blue Raiders 38–14.

Statistics	MUR	MTSU
First downs	16	21
Plays–yards	49–290	48–396
Rushes–yards	27–145	22–196
Passing yards	145	200
Passing: comp–att–int	13–22–0	20–26–0
Turnovers	1	0
Time of possession	34:18	25:42

Team	Category	Player	Statistics
Murray State	Passing	Jim Ogle	11/16, 118 yards
Murray State	Rushing	Tyrell Campbell	8 carries, 75 yards, TD
Murray State	Receiving	Dimitri Howard	3 receptions, 49 yards
Middle Tennessee	Passing	Roman Gagliano	20/26, 200 yards, 2 TD
Middle Tennessee	Rushing	Antonio Martin	15 carries, 103 yards
Middle Tennessee	Receiving	Cam'ron Lacy	8 receptions, 118 yards, TD

=== Valparaiso ===
Valparaiso Beacons (1–0) at Murray State Racers (0–2) – Game summary

Quarter	1	2	3	4	Total
Beacons	0	7	3	8	18
Racers	7	7	0	13	27

at Roy Stewart Stadium • Murray, Kentucky

- Date: September 12
- Game time: 6:00 p.m.
- Game weather: Sunny • Temperature: 85 °F (29 °C)
- Game attendance: 11,122
- Referee: Grant Henderson
- TV announcers (ESPN+): Casey Roehl (play-by-play) and Drayton Charlton-Perrin (analyst)

Game information
First quarter
- (3:51) MURR – Jawaun Northington 2-yard run, Rocco Devita kick (Drive: 13 plays, 59 yards, 5:55; Murray State 7–0)

Second quarter

- (11:41) VAL – Rowan Keefe 4-yard run, Luke Scoma kick (Drive: 8 plays, 72 yards, 4:22; Tied 7–7)
- (9:23) MURR – Mykel Allen 12-yard run, Rocco Devita kick (Drive: 4 plays, 62 yards, 2:11; Murray State 14–7)

Third quarter

- (2:27) VAL – Luke Scoma 37-yard field goal (Drive: 7 plays, 53 yards, 2:45; Murray State 14–10)

Fourth quarter

- (8:06) MURR – Baxter Wright 1-yard run, Rocco Devita kick (Drive: 9 plays, 56 yards, 3:49; Murray State 21–10)
- (4:57) VAL – Isaac Tran 23-yard pass from Rowan Keefe, Colin Hayes pass (Drive: 7 plays, 75 yards, 3:04; Murray State 21–18)
- (0:19) MURR – Mykel Allen 5-yard pass from Jim Ogle (Drive: 8 plays, 75 yards, 4:38; Murray State 27–18)

Statistics	VAL	MUR
First downs	14	19
Plays–yards	58–327	70–388
Rushes–yards	23–78	40–194
Passing yards	249	194
Passing: comp–att–int	20–35–1	18–30–1
Turnovers	1	1
Time of possession	27:35	32:25

Team	Category	Player	Statistics
Valparaiso	Passing	Rowan Keefe	20/35, 249 yards, TD, INT
Valparaiso	Rushing	Rowan Keefe	6 carries, 29 yards, TD
Valparaiso	Receiving	Chris Gundy	5 receptions, 107 yards
Murray State	Passing	Collin Shannon	11/17, 121 yards
Murray State	Rushing	Tyrell Campbell	14 carries, 117 yards
Murray State	Receiving	Trey Firestone	3 receptions, 62 yards

=== at Oklahoma State (FBS) ===
Murray State Racers (1–2) at Oklahoma State Cowboys (FBS) (1–1) – Game summary

Quarter	1	2	3	4	Total
Racers	0	0	0	0	0
Cowboys (FBS)	14	17	21	7	59

at Boone Pickens Stadium • Stillwater, Oklahoma

- Date: September 19
- Game time: 6:00 p.m.
- Game weather: Sunny • Temperature: 99 °F (37 °C) • Wind: SE at 11 miles per hour (18 km/h)
- Game attendance: 52,168
- Referee: Tutashinda Salaam
- TV announcers (ESPN+): James Westling (play-by-play) and Jeff Woody (analyst)

Game information
First quarter
- (9:15) OKST − Miles Coleman 2 yard pass from Drew Mestemaker, Sam Keltner kick (Drive: 8 plays, 72 yards, 2:58; OKST 7−0)
- (2:35) OKST − Wyatt Young 13 yard pass from Drew Mestemaker, Sam Keltner kick (Drive: 8 plays, 80 yards, 3:10; OKST 14−0)

Second quarter

- (13:05) OKST − Justin Bowick 24 yard pass from Drew Mestemaker, Sam Keltner kick (Drive: 7 plays, 86 yards, 2:59; OKST 21−0)
- (7:47) OKST − Sam Keltner 23 yard field goal (Drive: 6 plays, 67 yards, 3:26; OKST 24−0)
- (3:41) OKST − Justin Bowick 36 yard pass from Drew Mestemaker, Sam Keltner kick (Drive: 5 plays, 73 yards, 2:07; OKST 31−0)

Third quarter

- (13:35) OKST − Terrence Lewis 31 yard pass from Drew Mestemaker, Sam Keltner kick (Drive: 4 plays, 62 yards, 1:20; OKST 38−0)
- (8:22) OKST − Carson Kolb 10 yard pass from Broderick Vehrs, Sam Keltner kick (Drive: 7 plays, 73 yards, 3:28; OKST 45−0)
- (2:17) OKST − Tre Page III 6 yard rush, Sam Keltner kick (Drive: 9 plays, 57 yards, 4:41; OKST 52−0)

Fourth quarter

- (12:47) OKST − KD Jones 6 yard rush, Sam Keltner kick (Drive: 5 plays, 40 yards, 2:46; OKST 59−0)

Statistics	MUR	OKST
First downs	5	33
Plays–yards	46–160	73–662
Rushes–yards	23–76	45–301
Passing yards	84	361
Passing: comp–att–int	14–23–1	26–28–0
Turnovers	1	1
Time of possession	24:52	35:08

Team	Category	Player	Statistics
Murray State	Passing	Jim Ogle	13/21, 79 yards
Murray State	Rushing	Dylan Embry	2 carries, 26 yards
Murray State	Receiving	Dimitri Howard	1 receptions, 38 yards
Oklahoma State	Passing	Drew Mestemaker	20/22, 324 yards, 5 TD
Oklahoma State	Rushing	Caleb Hawkins	11 carries, 72 yards
Oklahoma State	Receiving	Justin Bowick	9 receptions, 178 yards, 2 TD

=== No. 24 Southern Illinois ===
No. 24 Southern Illinois Salukis (2–2) at Murray State Racers (1–3) – Game summary

Quarter	1	2	3	4	Total
No. 24 Salukis	0	0	0	0	0
Racers	0	0	0	0	0

at Roy Stewart Stadium • Murray, Kentucky

- Date: September 26
- Game time: 6:00 p.m.
- TV: ESPN+

Game information
First quarter

Second quarter Third quarter Fourth quarter

Statistics	SIU	MUR
First downs		
Plays–yards		
Rushes–yards		
Passing yards		
Passing: comp–att–int		
Turnovers		
Time of possession		

Team	Category	Player	Statistics
Southern Illinois	Passing		
Southern Illinois	Rushing		
Southern Illinois	Receiving		
Murray State	Passing		
Murray State	Rushing		
Murray State	Receiving		

=== at No. 5 North Dakota ===
Murray State Racers (1–4) at No. 5 North Dakota Fighting Hawks (4–1) – Game summary

Quarter	1	2	3	4	Total
Racers	0	0	0	0	0
No. 5 Fighting Hawks	0	0	0	0	0

at Alerus Center • Grand Forks, North Dakota

- Date: October 3
- Game time: 1:00 p.m.

Game information
First quarter

Second quarter Third quarter Fourth quarter

Statistics	MUR	UND
First downs		
Plays–yards		
Rushes–yards		
Passing yards		
Passing: comp–att–int		
Turnovers		
Time of possession		

Team	Category	Player	Statistics
Murray State	Passing		
Murray State	Rushing		
Murray State	Receiving		
North Dakota	Passing		
North Dakota	Rushing		
North Dakota	Receiving		

=== No. 9 South Dakota ===
No. 9 South Dakota Coyotes (5–2) at Murray State Racers (1–5) – Game summary

Quarter	1	2	3	4	Total
No. 9 Coyotes	0	14	13	21	48
Racers	7	7	0	6	20

at Roy Stewart Stadium • Murray, Kentucky

- Date: October 17
- Game time: 4:00 p.m.
- Game weather: Sunny • Temperature: 59 °F (15 °C)
- Game attendance: 14,100
- Referee: Dave Hergert
- TV announcers (ESPN+): Rob Cross (play-by-play) and Bryan Cross (analyst)

Game information
First quarter
- (7:36) MUR – Dimitri Howard 11-yard pass from Baxter Wright, Tyler Dorn kick (Drive: 8 plays, 80 plays, 3:56; Murray State 7–0)

Second quarter

- (12:48) SDAK – Brayden White 4-yard pass from Austyn Modrzewski, Bohdie Ing kick (Drive: 17 plays, 79 yards, 9:40; Tied 7–7)
- (2:14) SDAK – Chris Herrin 5-yard pass from Austyn Modrzewski, Bohdie Ing kick (Drive: 11 plays, 58 yards, 5:10; South Dakota 14–7)
- (0:36) MUR – Malachi Williams 4-yard pass from Baxter Wright, Tyler Dorn kick (Drive: 8 plays, 75 yards, 1:38; Tied 14–14)

Third quarter

- (13:04) SDAK – Tennel Bryant 5-yard run, Bohdie Ing kick (Drive: 2 plays, 4 yards, 0:25; South Dakota 21–14)
- (0:59) SDAK – Austyn Modrzewski 1-yard run, Bohdie Ing kick blocked (Drive: 7 plays, 19 yards, 2:32; South Dakota 27–14)

Fourth quarter

- (10:15) SDAK – Brayden White 9-yard pass from Austyn Modrzewski, Bohdie Ing kick (Drive: 6 plays, 78 yards, 3:10; South Dakota 34–14)
- (9:12) SDAK – Reid Watkins 2-yard run, Bohdie Ing kick (Drive: 2 plays, 16 yards, 0:49; South Dakota 41–14)
- (5:33) MUR – Trey Firestone 20-yard pass from Collin Shannon, Baxter Wright pass failed (Drive: 10 plays, 71 yards, 3:39; South Dakota 41–20)
- (1:12) SDAK – Courtney Rivers 6-yard run, Bohdie Ing kick (Drive: 7 plays, 15 yards, 4:17; South Dakota 48–20)

Statistics	SDAK	MUR
First downs	25	18
Plays–yards	72–327	63–351
Rushes–yards	45–174	28–145
Passing yards	153	206
Passing: comp–att–int	17–27–1	20–35–0
Turnovers	1	2
Time of possession	37:45	22:15

Team	Category	Player	Statistics
South Dakota	Passing	Austyn Modrzewski	17/27, 153 yards, 3 TD, INT
South Dakota	Rushing	Carson Fletcher	12 carries, 56 yards
South Dakota	Receiving	Brayden White	7 receptions, 78 yards, 2 TD
Murray State	Passing	Collin Shannon	10/17, 150 yards, TD
Murray State	Rushing	Baxter Wright	8 carries, 59 yards
Murray State	Receiving	Jaxon Potter	6 receptions, 69 yards

=== at No. 5 South Dakota State ===
Murray State Racers (1–6) at No. 5 South Dakota State Jackrabbits (5–2) – Game summary

Quarter	1	2	3	4	Total
Racers	0	0	0	0	0
No. 5 Jackrabbits	0	0	0	0	0

at Dana J. Dykhouse Stadium • Brookings, South Dakota

- Date: October 24
- Game time: 2:00 p.m.

Game information
First quarter

Second quarter Third quarter Fourth quarter

Statistics	MUR	SDST
First downs		
Plays–yards		
Rushes–yards		
Passing yards		
Passing: comp–att–int		
Turnovers		
Time of possession		

Team	Category	Player	Statistics
Murray State	Passing		
Murray State	Rushing		
Murray State	Receiving		
South Dakota State	Passing		
South Dakota State	Rushing		
South Dakota State	Receiving		

=== at No. 10 Illinois State ===
Murray State Racers (1–7) at No. 10 Illinois State Redbirds (6–2) – Game summary

Quarter	1	2	3	4	Total
Racers	0	0	0	0	0
No. 10 Redbirds	0	0	0	0	0

at Hancock Stadium • Normal, Illinois

- Date: October 31
- Game time: 1:00 p.m.

Game information
First quarter

Second quarter Third quarter Fourth quarter

Statistics	MUR	ILST
First downs		
Plays–yards		
Rushes–yards		
Passing yards		
Passing: comp–att–int		
Turnovers		
Time of possession		

Team	Category	Player	Statistics
Murray State	Passing		
Murray State	Rushing		
Murray State	Receiving		
Illinois State	Passing		
Illinois State	Rushing		
Illinois State	Receiving		

=== No. 4 Youngstown State ===
No. 4 Youngstown State Penguins (7–2) at Murray State Racers (1–8) – Game summary

Quarter	1	2	3	4	Total
No. 4 Penguins	14	21	14	13	62
Racers	7	0	14	14	35

at Roy Stewart Stadium • Murray, Kentucky

- Date: November 7
- Game time: 1:00 p.m.
- Game weather: Sunny • Temperature: 52 °F (11 °C) • Wind: S at 6 miles per hour (9.7 km/h)
- Game attendance: 3,567
- Referee: Jason Berg
- TV announcers (ESPN+): Casey Roehl (play-by-play) and Rob Cross (analyst)

Game information
First quarter
- (6:41) YSU – Max Welter 10-yard pass from Beau Brungard, Andrew Lastovka kick (Drive: 11 plays, 91 yards, 4:48; Youngstown State 7–0)
- (4:53) MUR – Trey Firestone 10-yard pass from Collin Shannon, Tyler Dorn kick (Drive: 4 plays, 83 yards, 1:43; Tied 7–7)
- (1:41) YSU – Antuan Gardner 9-yard run, Andrew Lastovka kick (Drive: 7 plays, 42 yards 3:12; Youngstown State 14–7)

Second quarter

- (10:34) YSU – Bryan Hunt 19-yard pass from Beau Brungard, Andrew Lastovka kick (Drive: 7 plays, 71 yards, 3:17; Youngstown State 21–7)
- (7:51) YSU – Fresh Walter 28-yard pass from Beau Brungard, Andrew Lastovka kick (Drive: 4 plays, 90 yards, 1:49; Youngstown State 28–7)
- (0:24) YSU – Lynn Wyche-El 28-yard pass from Beau Brungard, Andrew Lastovka kick (Drive: 5 plays, 68 yards, 1:09; Youngstown State 35–7)

Third quarter

- (10:36) YSU – Antuan Gardner 2-yard run, Andrew Lastovka kick (Drive: 8 plays, 75 yards, 4:24; Youngstown State 42–7)
- (6:18) MUR – Malachi Williams 15-yard pass from Collin Shannon, Tyler Dorn kick (Drive: 7 plays, 75 yards, 4:08; Youngstown State 42–14)
- (4:14) YSU – Jaden Gilbert 2-yard run, Andrew Lastovka kick (Drive: 5 plays, 44 yards, 2:03; Youngstown State 49–14)
- (0:54) MUR – Tyrell Campbell 5-yard run, Tyler Dorn kick (Drive: 6 plays, 75 yards, 3:14; Youngstown State 49–21)

Fourth quarter

- (11:43) YSU – Jaden Gilbert 1-yard run, Andrew Lastovka kick (Drive: 9 plays, 72 yards, 4:05; Youngstown State 56–21)
- (7:54) MUR – Cade Fields 32-yard run, Tyler Dorn kick (Drive: 7 plays, 75 yards, 3:49; Youngstown State 56–28)
- (2:36) YSU – Fresh Walters 7-yard pass from Malachi Lewis, Evan Anderson rush failed (Drive: 10 plays, 43 yards, 5:16; Youngstown State 62–28)
- (0:04) MUR – Dylan Embry 3-yard pass from Collin Shannon, Tyler Dorn kick (Drive: 14 plays, 75 yards, 2:32; Youngstown State 62–35)

Statistics	YSU	MUR
First downs	31	33
Plays–yards	67–589	75–536
Rushes–yards	29–154	36–185
Passing yards	435	351
Passing: comp–att–int	34–38–0	23–39–0
Turnovers	0	0
Time of possession	30:16	29:44

Team	Category	Player	Statistics
Youngstown State	Passing	Beau Brungard	31/34, 423 yards, 4 TD
Youngstown State	Rushing	Jaden Gilbert	7 carries, 42 yards, 2 TD
Youngstown State	Receiving	Lynn Wyche-El	10 receptions, 145 yards, TD
Murray State	Passing	Collin Shannon	23/39, 351 yards, 3 TD
Murray State	Rushing	Tyrell Campbell	19 carries, 142 yards, TD
Murray State	Receiving	Jaxon Potter	6 receptions, 115 yards

=== at Indiana State ===
Murray State Racers (1–9) at Indiana State Sycamores (2–8) – Game summary

Quarter	1	2	3	4	Total
Racers	7	14	13	10	44
Sycamores	7	7	0	0	14

at Memorial Stadium • Terre Haute, Indiana

- Date: November 14
- Game time: 12:00 p.m.
- Game weather: Sunny
- Game attendance: 2,666
- Referee: Tyler Downs
- TV announcers (ESPN+): Brian Jennings (play-by-play) and Austin Osborne (analyst)

Game information
First quarter
- MUR – Jaxon Potter 96-yard pass from Collin Shannon (Tyler Dorn kick), 7:31. Racers 7–0. Drive: 1 play, 96 yards, 0:14.
- INST – Zechariah Prince 73-yard run (Sebastian Lopez kick), 1:20. Tied 7–7. Drive: 1 play, 73 yards, 0:11.

Second quarter

- MUR – Jaxon Potter 15-yard pass from Collin Shannon (Tyler Dorn kick), 10:45. Racers 14–7. Drive: 11 plays, 75 yards, 5:35.
- MUR – Dimitri Howard 10-yard run (Tyler Dorn kick), 1:08. Racers 21–7. Drive: 6 plays, 47 yards, 2:31.
- INST – BJ Wuest 100-yard blocked field goal return (Sebastian Lopez kick), 0:00. Racers 21–14.

Third quarter

- MUR – Jawaun Northington 2-yard run (Tyler Dorn kick), 6:50. Racers 28–14. Drive: 1 play, 2 yards, 0:04.
- MUR – Trey Firestone 5-yard pass from Collin Shannon, 3:24. Racers 34–14. Drive: 6 plays, 39 yards, 2:19.

Fourth quarter

- MUR – Rocco Devita 25-yard field goal, 14:27. Racers 37–14. Drive: 8 plays, 33 yards, 2:44.
- MUR – Baxter Wright 21-yard run (Rocco Devita kick), 3:39. Racers 44–14. Drive: 14 plays, 99 yards, 6:48.

Statistics	MUR	INST
First downs	31	7
Plays–yards	78–577	48–140
Rushes–yards	41–215	30–68
Passing yards	362	72
Passing: comp–att–int	27–37–0	9–18–1
Turnovers	0	1
Time of possession	37:34	22:26

Team	Category	Player	Statistics
Murray State	Passing	Collin Shannon	25/33, 355 yards, 3 TD
Murray State	Rushing	Jawaun Northington	20 carries, 103 yards, TD
Murray State	Receiving	Jaxon Potter	11 receptions, 228 yards, 2 TD
Indiana State	Passing	Brock Riddle	5/10, 38 yards, INT
Indiana State	Rushing	Zechariah Prince	17 carries, 109 yards, TD
Indiana State	Receiving	Tyler Stewart	2 receptions, 31 yards

=== Northern Iowa ===
Northern Iowa Panthers (4–6) at Murray State Racers (2–9) – Game summary

Quarter	1	2	3	4	Total
Panthers	0	0	0	0	0
Racers	0	0	0	0	0

at Roy Stewart Stadium • Murray, Kentucky

- Date: November 21
- Game time: 1:00 p.m.

Game information
First quarter

Second quarter Third quarter Fourth quarter

Statistics	UNI	MUR
First downs		
Plays–yards		
Rushes–yards		
Passing yards		
Passing: comp–att–int		
Turnovers		
Time of possession		

Team	Category	Player	Statistics
Northern Iowa	Passing		
Northern Iowa	Rushing		
Northern Iowa	Receiving		
Murray State	Passing		
Murray State	Rushing		
Murray State	Receiving		
