= 2026 Missouri Valley Football Conference season =

American college football conference season

- League: NCAA Division I Football Championship Subdivision
- Sport: Football
- Duration: August 27, 2026 through January 4, 2027
- Teams: 9
- TV partner(s): ESPN College Football, ESPN+, Local TV partners

2027 NFL draft

Regular season
- Regular season champion: South Dakota State

Football seasons
- 2025 2027

2026 Missouri Valley Football Conference standings
	Conf.			Overall
Team	W		L	W		L
No. 3 South Dakota State $^	7	–	1	10	–	2
No. 6 Youngstown State	6	–	2	8	–	3
No. 7 South Dakota	6	–	2	9	–	3
No. 10 North Dakota	5	–	3	8	–	4
No. 11 Illinois State	4	–	4	8	–	4
Southern Illinois	3	–	5	5	–	7
Northern Iowa	3	–	5	4	–	7
Murray State	2	–	6	3	–	9
Indiana State	0	–	8	2	–	10
$ – Conference champion; ^ – FCS playoff participant; As of November 22, 2026; Rankings from STATS Poll

The 2026 Missouri Valley Football Conference season is the 41st season of college football play for the Missouri Valley Football Conference and part of the 2026 NCAA Division I FCS football season. This is the conference's first season at 9 teams since the 2011 season.

== Conference changes ==
On February 9, 2026, North Dakota State accepted an invitation to join the Mountain West Conference and reclassify to the Football Bowl Subdivision effective July 1, 2026.

== Coaching changes ==
=== South Dakota ===
On February 6, 2026, Travis Johansen announced he would be leaving the Coyotes for the defensive coordinator job at Rutgers. Later that same day, South Dakota named Matt Vitzthum the 32nd head coach of the program.

== Preseason ==
=== League poll ===
The annual preseason poll; voted on by conference coaches, athletic directors, and media members.

Predicted finish	Team	Points (First place votes)
1	South Dakota State	312 (28)
2	Illinois State	256 (3)
3	Youngstown State	235
4	North Dakota	211 (2)
5	South Dakota	196 (2)
6	Southern Illinois	186 (1)
7	Northern Iowa	99
8	Indiana State	80
9	Murray State	45

=== Individual awards ===
The MVFC preseason watch list; which is a list voted on by the league's coaches, athletic directors, and media members.

Category	Player	School	Position
Offense	Beau Brungard	Youngstown State	QB
Offense	Jaxon Dailey	Northern Iowa	QB
Offense	Jerry Kaminski	North Dakota	QB
Offense	Chase Mason	South Dakota State	QB
Offense	Elijah Owens	Indiana State	QB
Offense	DJ Williams	Southern Illinois	QB
Offense	Chandler Chapman	Southern Illinois	RB
Offense	Victor Dawson	Illinois State	RB
Offense	Jaden Gilbert	Youngstown State	RB
Offense	Keyondray Jones-Logan	South Dakota	RB
Offense	Ramon McKinney Jr.	South Dakota State	RB
Offense	Charles Pierre Jr.	South Dakota	RB
Offense	Edward Robinson	Southern Illinois	RB
Offense	Mason South	North Dakota	FB
Offense	Tysen Boze	South Dakota	WR
Offense	Tennel Bryant	South Dakota	WR
Offense	Deng Deng	North Dakota	WR
Offense	Grahm Goering	South Dakota State	WR
Offense	Dylan Lord	Illinois State	WR
Offense	Luke Mailander	Illinois State	WR
Offense	Allen Middleton	Southern Illinois	WR
Offense	Lofton O'Groske	South Dakota State	WR
Offense	KeShon Singleton	Indiana State	WR
Offense	Fresh Walters	Youngstown State	WR
Offense	Dorian Williams	Youngstown State	WR
Offense	Austin Bray	Youngstown State	TE
Offense	Greyton Gannon	South Dakota State	TE
Offense	Coleman Kuntz	South Dakota State	TE
Offense	Jesse Miller	South Dakota	TE
Offense	Liam Becher	North Dakota	OL
Offense	Ben Buxa	North Dakota	OL
Offense	Trace Thaden	North Dakota	OL
Offense	Logan Brasfield	Illinois State	OL
Offense	Landon Woodard	Illinois State	OL
Offense	Quinten Christensen	South Dakota State	OL
Offense	Shane Willenbring	South Dakota State	OL
Offense	Jake Darby	Murray State	OL
Offense	AJ Shadid	Murray State	OL
Offense	Blaine Halley	Southern Illinois	OL
Offense	Derek Harden	Southern Illinois	OL
Offense	Desmeal Leigh	Youngstown State	OL
Offense	Shane Keenan	Youngstown State	OL
Offense	Nick Nielsen	Youngstown State	OL
Offense	Drew Page	Indiana State	OL
Offense	Zach Simpson	Indiana State	OL
Offense	Kyle Kelly	Northern Iowa	OL
Offense	Brock Woolf	South Dakota	OL
Special Teams	Andrew Lastovka	Youngstown State	PK
Special Teams	Hayden Futch	Illinois State	P
Special Teams	Logan Gregory	Northern Iowa	P
Special Teams	Max Pelham	South Dakota State	P
Special Teams	Luke Silvernale	North Dakota	P
Special Teams	Ryan Algrim	Southern Illinois	LS
Special Teams	Mar'Quan Gary	Illinois State	RS/APB
Special Teams	Jack Smith	South Dakota State	RS/APB

Category	Player	School	Position
Defense	Jayden Childers	Indiana State	DL
Defense	Kolten Gajewski	Indiana State	DL
Defense	Mason Knipp	Indiana State	DL
Defense	Chris Dixon	South Dakota	DL
Defense	Nathan Laperi	South Dakota	DL
Defense	Amir Dwight	Southern Illinois	DL
Defense	Jake Parrella	Southern Illinois	DL
Defense	Logan Green	South Dakota State	DL
Defense	Reis Kirschenman	South Dakota State	DL
Defense	Dawson Ripperda	South Dakota State	DL
Defense	Jace Sifore	South Dakota State	DL
Defense	Carter Sitzman	South Dakota State	DL
Defense	Ben Harman	Illinois State	DL
Defense	Thomas Jolly	Youngstown State	DL
Defense	Mike Wells	Youngstown State	DL
Defense	Jaylen Pettus	Northern Iowa	DL
Defense	Lance Rucker	North Dakota	DL
Defense	Kaden Vig	North Dakota	DL
Defense	Jayden Walker	Murray State	DL
Defense	Andrew Behm	Southern Illinois	LB
Defense	Chris Presto	Southern Illinois	LB
Defense	Conlee Crossno	Murray State	LB
Defense	Klayton Ingram	Murray State	LB
Defense	Micheal Devereaux	North Dakota	LB
Defense	Gabe Hardman	South Dakota	LB
Defense	Mason Kaplan	Illinois State	LB
Defense	Dexter Niekamp	Illinois State	LB
Defense	Tye Niekamp	Illinois State	LB
Defense	Carston Marshall	Youngstown State	LB
Defense	Cullen McShane	South Dakota State	LB
Defense	Chase Van Tol	South Dakota State	LB
Defense	Kolben Miller	Northern Iowa	LB
Defense	Braxton Sampson	Indiana State	LB
Defense	Xavian Andrews	Indiana State	DB
Defense	Jorge Valdes	Indiana State	DB
Defense	Nic Yatsko	Indiana State	DB
Defense	La'Shavion Brown	Illinois State	DB
Defense	Raleigh Collins	Youngstown State	DB
Defense	Dev Holman	Youngstown State	DB
Defense	Cam Smith	Youngstown State	DB
Defense	Ife Current	South Dakota State	DB
Defense	Noah St. Juste	South Dakota State	DB
Defense	Jordan McClom	Northern Iowa	DB
Defense	Grant Noland	North Dakota	DB
Defense	Vinny Pierre	Southern Illinois	DB
Defense	Gavin Shephard	Southern Illinois	DB
Defense	RJ Stewart	South Dakota	DB

== Rankings ==
		Pre	Wk 1	Wk 2	Wk 3	Wk 4	Wk 5	Wk 6	Wk 7	Wk 8	Wk 9	Wk 10	Wk 11	Wk 12	Wk 13	Final
Illinois State	STATS	4	4	5	5	3	10	12	13	10	10	10	15	11		
Illinois State	Coaches	4	4	4	4	4т	11	13	13	10	9	8	17	13		
Indiana State	STATS															
Indiana State	Coaches															
Murray State	STATS															
Murray State	Coaches															
North Dakota	STATS	10	8	6	6	7	5	4	11	6	9	11	11	10		
North Dakota	Coaches	10	9	7	6	8	7	7	15	8	11	15	12т	11		
Northern Iowa	STATS						RV	RV	19	21	RV	RV				
Northern Iowa	Coaches						RV		25	RV		RV				
South Dakota	STATS	12	11	11	10	8	13	10	9	8	6	8	10	7		
South Dakota	Coaches	12	12	12	12	12	16	12	9	6	6	10	10	6		
South Dakota State	STATS	3	2	2	2	2	2	1	1	5	5	5	4	3		
South Dakota State	Coaches	3	2	3	3	2	2	1	1	5	5	5	4	3		
Southern Illinois	STATS	16	RV	RV	24	24	21	25	RV				RV			
Southern Illinois	Coaches	16	25	RV	25	RV	25	RV	RV		RV					
Youngstown State	STATS	9	9	10	9	11	8	8	6	4	4	4	3	6		
Youngstown State	Coaches	9	7	10	9	13	10	9	6	4	4	4	3	8		

== Schedule ==
Index to colors and formatting
MVFC member won
MVFC member lost
MVFC teams in **bold**

All times Central time.

† denotes Homecoming game
^ denotes AP Poll ranking for FBS teams

=== Regular season schedule ===
==== Week 1 ====
Date	Time	Visiting team	Home team	Site	TV	Result	Attendance	Ref.
August 27	5:00 PM	Mercyhurst	No. 9 **Youngstown State**	Stambaugh Stadium • Youngstown, OH	ESPN+	**W** 43–10	8,214	
August 27	5:00 PM	No. 16 **Southern Illinois**	West Florida	Pen Air Field • Pensacola, FL	ESPN+	**L** 31–34	6,124	
August 27	6:00 PM	Eastern Illinois	**Murray State**	Roy Stewart Stadium • Murray, KY	ESPN+	**L** 14–28	5,671	
August 27	7:00 PM	LIU	No. 10 **North Dakota**	Alerus Center • Grand Forks, ND	ESPN+	**W** 42–21	10,344	
August 29	1:00 PM	Central Connecticut	No. 12 **South Dakota**	DakotaDome • Vermillion, SD	ESPN+	**W** 59–20	7,168	
August 29	6:00 PM	No. RV Southeast Missouri State	**Indiana State**	Memorial Stadium • Terre Haute, IN	ESPN+	**L** 21–23	5,521	
August 29	6:00 PM	Stetson	No. 3 **South Dakota State**	Dana J. Dykhouse Stadium • Brookings, SD	ESPN+	**W** 70–7	19,192	
August 29	6:00 PM	St. Francis (IL)	No. 4 **Illinois State**	Hancock Stadium • Normal, IL	ESPN+	**W** 76–0	9,072	
^{#}Rankings from Stats Perform. All times are in Central Time.

==== Week 2 ====
Date	Time	Visiting team	Home team	Site	TV	Result	Attendance	Ref.
September 3	6:00 PM	No. RV **Southern Illinois**	Samford	Pete Hanna Stadium • Homewood, AL	ESPN+	**W** 22–18	6,713	
September 4	7:00 PM	**Indiana State**	Purdue	Ross-Ade Stadium • West Lafayette, IN	BTN	**L** 19–44	49,019	
September 5	12:00 PM	No. 9 **Youngstown State**	Kentucky	Kroger Field • Lexington, KY	SECN+/ESPN+	**L** 13–45	60,166	
September 5	3:00 PM	St. Thomas	No. 8 **North Dakota**	Alerus Center • Grand Forks, ND	ESPN+	**W** 62–26	10,909	
September 5	6:00 PM	**Murray State**	Middle Tennessee	Johnny "Red" Floyd Stadium • Murfreesboro, TN	ESPN+	**L** 14–38	16,227	
September 5	6:00 PM	No. 4 **Illinois State**	Western Illinois	Hanson Field • Macomb, IL	ESPN+	**W** 41–10	2,716	
September 5	6:00 PM	**Northern Iowa**	Eastern Washington	Roos Field • Cheney, WA	ESPN+	**L** 24–34	4,389	
September 5	7:00 PM	No. 2 **South Dakota State**	Northwestern	Martin Stadium • Chicago, IL	BTN	**L** 18–34	9,574	
September 5	7:00 PM	No. 11 **South Dakota**	Northern Colorado	Nottingham Field • Greeley, CO	ESPN+	**W** 38–23	4,259	
^{#}Rankings from Stats Perform. All times are in Central Time.

==== Week 3 ====
Date	Time	Visiting team	Home team	Site	TV	Result	Attendance	Ref.
September 12	1:00 PM	Duquesne	No. 10 **Youngstown State**	Stambaugh Stadium • Youngstown, OH	ESPN+	**W** 70–13	10,824	
September 12	1:00 PM	Drake	**Northern Iowa**	UNI-Dome • Cedar Falls, IA	ESPN+	**W** 56–14	9,170	
September 12	1:00 PM	Eastern Washington	No. 11 **South Dakota**	DakotaDome • Vermillion, SD	ESPN+	**W** 41–23	7,535	
September 12	6:00 PM	New Haven	No. 2 **South Dakota State**	Dana J. Dykhouse Stadium • Brookings, SD	ESPN+	**W** 57–14	19,013	
September 12	6:00 PM	No. 5 **Illinois State**	Northern Illinois	Huskie Stadium • DeKalb, IL	MW+	**W** 28–24	17,582	
September 12	6:00 PM	No. RV Southeast Missouri State	No. RV **Southern Illinois**	Saluki Stadium • Carbondale, IL	ESPN+	**W** 34–20	12,310	
September 12	6:00 PM	Valparaiso	**Murray State**	Roy Stewart Stadium • Murray, KY	ESPN+	**W** 27–18	11,122	
September 12	7:00 PM	**Indiana State**	Eastern Illinois	O'Brien Field • Charleston, IL	ESPN+	**W** 42–35	6,971	
September 12	9:00 PM	No. 6 **North Dakota**	Portland State	Hillsboro Stadium • Portland, OR	ESPN+	**W** 47–23	1,455	
^{#}Rankings from Stats Perform. All times are in Central Time.

==== Week 4 ====
Date	Time	Visiting team	Home team	Site	TV	Result	Attendance	Ref.
September 19	1:00 PM	No. 24 **Southern Illinois**	Illinois	Gies Memorial Stadium • Champaign, IL	Peacock	**L** 10–48	60,670	
September 19	1:00 PM	Valparaiso	**Indiana State**	Memorial Stadium • Terre Haute, IN	ESPN+	**W** 39–16	3,497	
September 19	2:00 PM	Eastern Illinois	No. 5 **Illinois State**	Hancock Stadium • Normal, IL	ESPN+	**W** 49–13	11,589	
September 19	3:00 PM	**Northern Iowa**	No. 18^ Iowa	Kinnick Stadium • Iowa City, IA	FS1	**L** 0–55	69,250	
September 19	6:00 PM	No. 9 **Youngstown State**	No. 2 **South Dakota State**	Dana J. Dykhouse Stadium • Brookings, SD	ESPN+	**SDSU** 27–20	18,541	
September 19	6:00 PM	**Murray State**	Oklahoma State	Boone Pickens Stadium • Stillwater, OK	ESPN+	**L** 0–59	52,168	
September 19	6:15 PM	No. 6 **North Dakota**	Nebraska	Memorial Stadium • Lincoln, NE	BTN	**L** 7–34	86,217	
September 19	9:00 PM	No. 10 **South Dakota**	Boise State	Albertsons Stadium • Boise, ID	CBSSN	**L** 24–38	34,428	
^{#}Rankings from Stats Perform. All times are in Central Time.

==== Week 5 ====
Date	Time	Visiting team	Home team	Site	TV	Result	Attendance	Ref.
September 26	1:00 PM	No. 8 **South Dakota**	No. 11 **Youngstown State**	Stambaugh Stadium • Youngstown, OH	ESPN+	**YSU** 47–28	8,849	
September 26	1:00 PM	No. 7 **North Dakota**	**Indiana State**	Memorial Stadium • Terre Haute, IN	ESPN+	**UND** 42–35	2,765	
September 26	4:00 PM	No. 3 **Illinois State**	**Northern Iowa**	UNI-Dome • Cedar Falls, IA	ESPN+	**UNI** 28–21	9,016	
September 26	6:00 PM	Eastern Illinois	No. 2 **South Dakota State**	Dana J. Dykhouse Stadium • Brookings, SD	ESPN+	**W** 42–7	18,264	
September 26	6:00 PM	No. 24 **Southern Illinois**	**Murray State**	Roy Stewart Stadium • Murray, KY	ESPN+	**SIU** 46–6	5,513	
^{#}Rankings from Stats Perform. All times are in Central Time.

==== Week 6 ====
Date	Time	Visiting team	Home team	Site	TV	Result	Attendance	Ref.
October 3	1:00 PM	**Murray State**	No. 5 **North Dakota**	Alerus Center • Grand Forks, ND	ESPN+	**UND** 55–28	10,985	
October 3	2:00 PM	**Indiana State**	No. 13 **South Dakota**	DakotaDome • Vermillion, SD	ESPN+	**USD** 44–14	9,002	
October 3	4:00 PM	No. 8 **Youngstown State**	No. 21 **Southern Illinois**	Saluki Stadium • Carbondale, IL	ESPN+	**YSU** 28–16	6,180	
October 3	6:00 PM	No. 2 **South Dakota State**	No. 10 **Illinois State**	Hancock Stadium • Normal, IL	ESPN+	**SDSU** 31–14	10,171	
^{#}Rankings from Stats Perform. All times are in Central Time.

Date	Bye Week
October 3	No. RV Northern Iowa

==== Week 7 ====
Date	Time	Visiting team	Home team	Site	TV	Result	Attendance	Ref.
October 10	1:00 PM	No. 8 **Youngstown State**	**Indiana State**	Memorial Stadium • Terre Haute, IN	ESPN+	**YSU** 57–24	4,428	
October 10	1:00 PM	No. 25 **Southern Illinois**	No. 10 **South Dakota**	DakotaDome • Vermillion, SD	ESPN+	**USD** 31–10	7,012	
October 10	4:00 PM	No. 4 **North Dakota**	No. RV **Northern Iowa**	UNI-Dome • Cedar Falls, IA	ESPN+	**UNI** 24–17	11,487	
^{#}Rankings from Stats Perform. All times are in Central Time.

Date	Bye Week		
October 10	No. 1 South Dakota State	Murray State	No. 12 Illinois State

==== Week 8 ====
Date	Time	Visiting team	Home team	Site	TV	Result	Attendance	Ref.
October 17	1:00 PM	No. 1 **South Dakota State**	No. 11 **North Dakota**	Alerus Center • Grand Forks, ND	ESPN+	**UND** 21–10	12,922	
October 17	3:00 PM	No. 13 **Illinois State**	No. RV **Southern Illinois**	Saluki Stadium • Carbondale, IL	ESPNU	**ILST** 35–14	9,086	
October 17	4:00 PM	No. 9 **South Dakota**	**Murray State**	Roy Stewart Stadium • Murray, KY	ESPN+	**USD** 48–20	14,100	
October 17	5:00 PM	No. 19 **Northern Iowa**	No. 6 **Youngstown State**	Stambaugh Stadium • Youngstown, OH	ESPN+	**YSU** 35–22	10,284	
^{#}Rankings from Stats Perform. All times are in Central Time.

Date	Bye Week
October 17	Indiana State

==== Week 9 ====
Date	Time	Visiting team	Home team	Site	TV	Result	Attendance	Ref.
October 24	1:00 PM	No. 21 **Northern Iowa**	**Southern Illinois**	Saluki Stadium • Carbondale, IL	ESPN+	**SIU** 20–17	5,206	
October 24	1:00 PM	No. 6 **North Dakota**	No. 8 **South Dakota**	DakotaDome • Vermillion, SD	ESPN+	**USD** 26–23 ^{OT}	8,241	
October 24	2:00 PM	**Murray State**	No. 5 **South Dakota State**	Dana J. Dykhouse Stadium • Brookings, SD	ESPN+	**SDSU** 42–9	19,302	
October 24	2:00 PM	**Indiana State**	No. 10 **Illinois State**	Hancock Stadium • Normal, IL	ESPN+	**ILST** 17–10	11,280	
^{#}Rankings from Stats Perform. All times are in Central Time.

Date	Bye Week
October 24	No. 4 Youngstown State

==== Week 10 ====
Date	Time	Visiting team	Home team	Site	TV	Result	Attendance	Ref.
October 31	11:00 AM	No. 9 **North Dakota**	No. 4 **Youngstown State**	Stambaugh Stadium • Youngstown, OH	ESPN+	**YSU** 31–28	9,415	
October 31	1:00 PM	**Murray State**	No. 10 **Illinois State**	Hancock Stadium • Normal, IL	ESPN+	**ILST** 35–14	6,083	
October 31	1:00 PM	**Indiana State**	No. RV **Northern Iowa**	UNI-Dome • Cedar Falls, IA	ESPN+	**UNI** 45–23	7,320	
October 31	3:00 PM	No. 6 **South Dakota**	No. 5 **South Dakota State**	Dana J. Dykhouse Stadium • Brookings, SD	ESPNU	**SDSU** 31–21	18,902	
^{#}Rankings from Stats Perform. All times are in Central Time.

Date	Bye Week
October 31	Southern Illinois

==== Week 11 ====
Date	Time	Visiting team	Home team	Site	TV	Result	Attendance	Ref.
November 7	1:00 PM	No. 10 **Illinois State**	No. 11 **North Dakota**	Alerus Center • Grand Forks, ND	ESPN+	**UND** 49–21	10,046	
November 7	1:00 PM	No. 5 **South Dakota State**	No. RV **Northern Iowa**	UNI-Dome • Cedar Falls, IA	ESPN+	**SDSU** 41–15	10,037	
November 7	1:00 PM	No. 4 **Youngstown State**	**Murray State**	Roy Stewart Stadium • Murray, KY	ESPN+	**YSU** 62–35	3,567	
November 7	6:00 PM	**Southern Illinois**	**Indiana State**	Memorial Stadium • Terre Haute, IN	ESPN+	**SIU** 37–20	3,247	
^{#}Rankings from Stats Perform. All times are in Central Time.

Date	Bye Week
November 7	No. 8 South Dakota

==== Week 12 ====
Date	Time	Visiting team	Home team	Site	TV	Result	Attendance	Ref.
November 14	1:00 PM	**Murray State**	**Indiana State**	Memorial Stadium • Terre Haute, IN	ESPN+	**MSU** 44–14	2,666	
November 14	1:00 PM	**Northern Iowa**	No. 10 **South Dakota**	DakotaDome • Vermillion, SD	ESPN+	**USD** 41–30	7,956	
November 14	1:00 PM	No. 4 **South Dakota State**	**Southern Illinois**	Saluki Stadium • Carbondale, IL	ESPN+	**SDSU** 52–16	5,968	
November 14	3:30 PM	No. 15 **Illinois State**	No. 3 **Youngstown State**	Stambaugh Stadium • Youngstown, OH	ESPN+	**ILST** 34–33	7,886	
^{#}Rankings from Stats Perform. All times are in Central Time.

Date	Bye Week
November 14	No. 11 North Dakota

==== Week 13 ====
Date	Time	Visiting team	Home team	Site	TV	Result	Attendance	Ref.
November 21	12:00 PM	No. 7 **South Dakota**	No. 11 **Illinois State**	Hancock Stadium • Normal, IL	ESPN+	**USD** 10–3	7,019	
November 21	1:00 PM	**Southern Illinois**	No. 10 **North Dakota**	Alerus Center • Grand Forks, ND	ESPN+	**UND** 28–23	9,427	
November 21	1:00 PM	**Northern Iowa**	**Murray State**	Roy Stewart Stadium • Murray, KY	ESPN+	**MSU** 51–14	4,213	
November 21	2:00 PM	**Indiana State**	No. 3 **South Dakota State**	Dana J. Dykhouse Stadium • Brookings, SD	ESPN+	**SDSU** 52–13	12,148	
^{#}Rankings from Stats Perform. All times are in Central Time.

Date	Bye Week
November 21	No. 6 Youngstown State

Conference schedule source:

== MVFC records vs other conferences ==
2026–27 records against non-conference foes:

FCS power conferences	Record
Big Sky	3–1
CAA	None
FCS power total	3–1
Other FCS conferences	Record
Ivy League	None
MEAC	None
Northeast	5–0
Ohio Valley	5–2
Patriot	None
PFL	5–0
SoCon	1–0
Southland	None
SWAC	None
UAC	0–1
Other FCS total	16–3
Other Division I opponents	Record
Football Bowl Subdivision	1–9
Total Division I	20–13
Other NCAA opponents	Record
Division II	0–0
Other opponents	Record
NAIA	1–0
Total non-conference record	21–13

Postseason

FCS power conferences	Record
Big Sky	None
CAA	None
FCS power total	0–0
Other FCS conferences	Record
Ivy League	None
MEAC	None
Northeast	None
Ohio Valley	None
Patriot	None
PFL	None
SoCon	None
Southland	None
SWAC	None
UAC	None
Other FCS total	0–0
Total postseason record	0–0

== Awards and honors ==
=== Players of the week honors ===
Week	Offensive			Defensive			Special teams			Newcomer			Offensive line		
Week	Player	Position	Team	Player	Position	Team	Player	Position	Team	Player	Position	Team	Player	Position	Team
Week 1 (Aug. 31)	Austyn Modrzewski	QB	USD	Chase Van Tol	LB	SDSU	Hayden Futch	P	ILST	Austyn Modrzewski	QB	USD	Quinten Christensen	LT	SDSU
Week 2 (Sept. 7)	Jerry Kaminski	QB	UND	Ben Fiegel	LB	SIU	Charles Langama	RB	UND	Ibrahim Sanogo	DE	SIU	Lance Thaden	LT	UND
Week 3 (Sept. 14)	Beau Brungard	QB	YSU	Tye Niekamp	LB	ILST	Gage Roy	RB	ILST	Charles Langama	RB/RS	UND	Griffin Hile	LT	INST
Week 4 (Sept. 21)	Josiah Johnson	RB	SDSU	Alex Rose	LB	INST	Aaron Ball	RB	INST	Dylan Lord	WR/PR	ILST	Andy Hertlein	RG	INST
Week 5 (Sept. 28)	Jerry Kaminski	QB	UND	Graydon Rollins	LB	YSU	Jayden Reed	WR	INST	Weston Schofield	K	SIU	Kellen Francis	OG	SIU
Week 6 (Oct. 5)	Jerry Kaminski	QB	UND	Myles Green	CB	SDSU	Brook Honore Jr.	P	USD	Cameron Weir	WR	UND	Caleb Olson	RG	UND
Week 7 (Oct. 12)	Beau Brungard	QB	YSU	Braden McShane	LB	UNI	Lynn Wyche-El	WR	YSU	Spencer Conrad	P	INST	Lucas Feldkamp	C	USD
Week 7 (Oct. 12)	Beau Brungard	QB	YSU	Braden McShane	LB	UNI	Lynn Wyche-El	WR	YSU	Andrew Price	LB	UNI	Lucas Feldkamp	C	USD
Week 8 (Oct. 19)	Beau Brungard	QB	YSU	Grant Noland	DB	UND	Donald Barksdale	RB/RS	YSU	Lynn Wyche-El	WR	YSU	Trace Thaden	LT	UND
Week 9 (Oct. 26)	Brayden White	WR	USD	Ibrahim Sanogo	DE	SIU	Jayden Reed	WR	INST	Weston Schofield	K	SIU	Derek Harden Jr.	G	SIU
Week 10 (Nov. 2)	Beau Brungard	QB	YSU	Braden McShane	LB	UNI	Mike Wells	LB	YSU	Lynn Wyche-El	WR	YSU	Kyle Kelly	OL	UNI
Week 11 (Nov. 9)	Beau Brungard	QB	YSU	Mike Devereaux	LB	UND	Lynn Wyche-El	WR	YSU	Tae Marrero Jr	RS/WR	SIU	Quinten Christensen	LT	SDSU
Week 11 (Nov. 9)	Jerry Kaminski	QB	UND	Mike Devereaux	LB	UND	Lynn Wyche-El	WR	YSU	Tae Marrero Jr	RS/WR	SIU	Quinten Christensen	LT	SDSU

== Home attendance ==
Team	Stadium	Capacity	Game 1	Game 2	Game 3	Game 4	Game 5	Game 6	Game 7	Game 8	Total	Average	% of capacity
Illinois State	Hancock Stadium	13,391	9,072	11,589†	10,171	11,280	6,083	7,019			55,214	9,202	68.7%
Indiana State	Memorial Stadium	12,764	5,521†	3,497	2,765	4,428	3,247	2,666			22,124	3,687	28.9%
Murray State	Roy Stewart Stadium	16,800	5,671	11,122	5,513	14,100†	3,567	4,213			44,186	7,364	43.8%
North Dakota	Alerus Center	12,283	10,344	10,909	10,985	**12,922**†	10,046	9,427			64,633	10,772	87.7%
Northern Iowa	UNI-Dome	16,324	9,170	9,016	11,487†	7,320	10,037				44,330	8,866	54.3%
South Dakota	DakotaDome	9,100	7,168	7,535	9,002†	7,012	8,241	7,956			46,914	7,819	85.9%
South Dakota State	Dana J. Dykhouse Stadium	19,340	19,192	19,013	18,541	18,264	19,302†	18,902	12,148		125,362	17,908	92.6%
Southern Illinois	Saluki Stadium	15,000	12,310†	6,180	9,086	5,206	5,968				38,750	7,750	51.7%
Youngstown State	Stambaugh Stadium	20,630	8,214	10,824†	8,849	10,284	9,415	7,886			55,472	9,245	44.8%

Bold - Exceed or met capacity
†Season High
‡FCS Playoff Game

== 2027 NFL Draft ==
The following list includes all MVFC players who were drafted in the 2027 NFL draft.

Player	Position	School	Draft round	Round pick	Overall pick	Team

== Head coaches ==
Through November 21, 2026
All stats include 2026 season

Team	Head coach	Years at school	Overall record	Record at school	MVFC record	MVFC titles	FCS playoff appearances	FCS playoff record	National titles
Illinois State	Brock Spack	18	131–83 (.612)	131–83 (.612)	80–61 (.567)	2	7	12–7 (.632)	0
Indiana State	Curt Mallory	9 (Note: Indiana State did not play football in the 2020–21 academic year)	29–74 (.282)	29–74 (.282)	17–55 (.236)	0	0	0–0 (–)	0
Murray State	Jody Wright	3	5–31 (.139)	5–31 (.139)	3–21 (.125)	0	0	0–0 (–)	0
North Dakota	Eric Schmidt	2	16–10 (.615)	16–10 (.615)	10–6 (.625)	0	1	1–1 (.500)	0
Northern Iowa	Todd Stepsis	2	7–16 (.304)	7–16 (.304)	4–12 (.250)	0	0	0–0 (–)	0
South Dakota	Matt Vitzthum	1	9–3 (.750)	9–3 (.750)	6–2 (.750)	0	0	0–0 (–)	0
South Dakota State	Dan Jackson	2	19–7 (.731)	19–7 (.731)	12–5 (.706)	1	2	1–1 (.500)	0
Southern Illinois	Nick Hill	11	60–68 (.469)	60–68 (.469)	35–51 (.407)	0	3	3–3 (.500)	0
Youngstown State	Doug Phillips	7	37–39 (.487)	37–39 (.487)	26–28 (.481)	0	2	1–2 (.333)	0
