= 2026 Northern Iowa Panthers football team =

American college football season

2026 Northern Iowa Panthers football
- Conference: Missouri Valley Football Conference
- Record: 4–7 (3–5 MVFC)
- Head coach: Todd Stepsis (2nd season)
- Defensive coordinator: Al Smith (2nd season)
- Home stadium: UNI-Dome

2026 Missouri Valley Football Conference standings
	Conf.			Overall
Team	W		L	W		L
No. 3 South Dakota State $^	6	–	1	10	–	2
No. 6 Youngstown State	6	–	2	8	–	3
No. 7 South Dakota	6	–	2	9	–	3
No. 10 North Dakota	5	–	3	8	–	4
No. 11 Illinois State	4	–	4	8	–	4
Southern Illinois	3	–	5	5	–	7
Northern Iowa	3	–	5	4	–	7
Murray State	2	–	6	3	–	9
Indiana State	0	–	8	2	–	10
$ – Conference champion; ^ – FCS playoff participant; As of November 22, 2026; Rankings from STATS Poll

The 2026 Northern Iowa Panthers football team is an American college football team that represents the University of Northern Iowa as a member of the Missouri Valley Football Conference (MVFC) during the 2026 NCAA Division I FCS football season. In its second year under head coach Todd Stepsis, the team has compiled a 4–6 record (3–4 in conference games) and has been outscored by a total of 301 to 264.

The team's statistical leaders include quarterback Jaxon Dailey (2,145 passing yards), running back Xavier Terrell (406 rushing yards), and wide receiver Brady McCullough (435 receiving yards, 36 points scored).

The team plays its home games at the UNI-Dome in Cedar Falls, Iowa.

== Preseason ==
=== MVFC poll ===
The Missouri Valley Football Conference released its preseason poll on July 14, 2026, voted on by league athletic directors, coaches, and media members. The Panthers were predicted to finish seventh in the conference.

== Schedule ==
Date	Time	Opponent	Rank	Site	TV	Result	Attendance
September 5	6:00 p.m.	at Eastern Washington*		Roos Field; Cheney, WA	ESPN+	L 24–34	4,389
September 12	1:00 p.m.	Drake*		UNI-Dome; Cedar Falls, IA (rivalry)	ESPN+	W 56–14	9,170
September 19	3:00 p.m.	at No. 18 (FBS) Iowa*		Kinnick Stadium; Iowa City, IA	FS1	L 0–55	69,250
September 26	4:00 p.m.	No. 3 Illinois State		UNI-Dome; Cedar Falls, IA	ESPN+	W 28–21	9,016
October 10	4:00 p.m.	No. 4 North Dakota^{†}		UNI-Dome; Cedar Falls, IA	ESPN+	W 24–17	11,487
October 17	5:00 p.m.	at No. 6 Youngstown State	No. 19	Stambaugh Stadium; Youngstown, OH	ESPN+	L 22–35	10,284
October 24	1:00 p.m.	at Southern Illinois	No. 21	Saluki Stadium; Carbondale, IL	ESPN+	L 17–20	5,206
October 31	1:00 p.m.	Indiana State		UNI-Dome; Cedar Falls, IA	ESPN+	W 45–23	7,320
November 7	1:00 p.m.	No. 5 South Dakota State		UNI-Dome; Cedar Falls, IA	ESPN+	L 15–41	10,037
November 14	1:00 p.m.	at No. 10 South Dakota		DakotaDome; Vermillion, SD	ESPN+	L 30–41	7,956
November 21	1:00 p.m.	at Murray State		Roy Stewart Stadium; Murray, KY	ESPN+	L 14–51	4,213
*Non-conference game; ^{†}Homecoming; Rankings from STATS Poll released prior to the game; All times are in Central time

== Game summaries ==
=== at Eastern Washington ===
Northern Iowa Panthers (0–0) at Eastern Washington Eagles (0–1) – Game summary

Quarter	1	2	3	4	Total
Panthers	10	14	0	0	24
Eagles	13	7	7	7	34

at Roos Field • Cheney, Washington

- Date: September 5
- Game time: 4:00 p.m.
- Game weather: Cloudy • Temperature: 69 °F (21 °C)
- Game attendance: 4,389
- Referee: Robert Quello
- TV announcers (ESPN+): Austin Getz and Bill Ames

Game information

First quarter

- EWU – Nate Bell 34-yard run (Soren McKee PAT blocked), 11:50. Eagles 7–0. Drive: 9 plays, 79 yards, 3:07.
- UNI – Jaxon Dailey 4-yard run (Max Bartachek kick), 10:07. Panthers 7–6. Drive: 4 plays, 72 yards, 1:38.
- EWU – Jaxon Branch 16-yard pass from Nate Bell (Soren McKee kick), 7:50. Eagles 13–7. Drive: 3 plays, 6 yards, 1:31.
- UNI – Max Bartachek 25-yard field goal, 3:00. Eagles 13–10. Drive: 11 plays, 67 yards, 4:50.

Second quarter

- UNI – Jaxon Dailey 1-yard run (Max Bartachek kick), 10:45. Panthers 17–13. Drive: 11 plays, 59 yards, 6:22.
- EWU – Nate Bell 2-yard run (Soren McKee kick), 4:26. Eagles 20–17. Drive: 15 plays, 75 yards, 6:19.
- UNI – Jaxon Dailey 9-yard run (Max Bartachek kick), 0:27. Panthers 24–20. Drive: 8 plays, 75 yards, 3:59.

Third quarter

- EWU – Nate Bell 2-yard run (Soren McKee kick), 1:32. Eagles 27–24. Drive: 16 plays, 84 yards, 6:36.

Fourth quarter

- EWU – Jamai East 15-yard pass from Nate Bell (Soren McKee kick), 3:16. Eagles 34–24. Drive: 12 plays, 80 yards, 5:37.

Statistics	UNI	EWU
First downs	23	27
Plays–yards	63–350	73–395
Rushes–yards	35–63	40–138
Passing yards	287	257
Passing: comp–att–int	20–28–1	24–33–0
Turnovers	1	0
Time of possession	30:41	29:19

Team	Category	Player	Statistics
Northern Iowa	Passing	Jaxon Dailey	20/28, 287 yards, INT
Northern Iowa	Rushing	Taj Hughes	3 carries, 23 yards
Northern Iowa	Receiving	Tay Norman	4 receptions, 61 yards
Eastern Washington	Passing	Nate Bell	24/33, 257 yards, 2 TD
Eastern Washington	Rushing	Nate Bell	18 carries, 94 yards, 3 TD
Eastern Washington	Receiving	Wesley Garrett	4 receptions, 70 yards

=== Drake (rivalry) ===
Drake Bulldogs (0–2) at Northern Iowa Panthers (0–1) – Game summary

Quarter	1	2	3	4	Total
Bulldogs	7	7	0	0	14
Panthers	21	7	21	7	56

at UNI-Dome • Cedar Falls, Iowa

- Date: September 12
- Game time: 1:00 p.m.
- Game weather: Indoors
- Game attendance: 9,170
- Referee: Tyler Downs
- TV announcers (ESPN+): Brad Wells (play-by-play) and Justin Surrency (analyst)

Game information

First quarter

- (12:15) UNI – Ben Gordon 12-yard run, Max Bartachek kick (Drive: 5 plays, 47 yards, 2:22; Northern Iowa 7–0)
- (7:56) UNI – Brady McCullough 14-yard pass from Jaxon Dailey, Max Bartachek kick (Drive: 6 plays, 79 yards, 2:49; Northern Iowa 14–0)
- (3:55) DRKE – Mitchell January 43-yard pass from Riley Warzynski, Griffin Kollhoff kick (Drive: 7 plays, 80 yards, 1:52; Northern Iowa 14–7)
- (0:28) UNI – Brady McCullough 17-yard pass from Jaxon Dailey, Max Bartachek kick (Drive: 8 plays, 70 yards, 3:22; Northern Iowa 21–7)

Second quarter

- (11:04) DRKE – Lincoln DeLaere 6-yard pass from Riley Warzynski, Griffin Kollhoff kick (Drive: 14 plays, 71 yards, 4:18; Northern Iowa 21–14)
- (0:41) UNI – Brady McCullough 13-yard pass from Jaxon Dailey, Max Bartachek kick (Drive: 5 plays, 27 yards, 1:59; Northern Iowa 28–14)

Third quarter

- (11:41) UNI – Christian Collins 7-yard run, Max Bartachek kick (Drive: 6 plays, 69 yards, 3:12; Northern Iowa 35–14)
- (8:50) UNI – Calvin Jaworski 80-yard interception, Max Bartachek kick (Northern Iowa 42–14)
- (2:48) UNI – Michael Bormann 2-yard run, Max Bartachek kick (Drive: 9 plays, 62 yards, 4:32; Northern Iowa 49–14)

Fourth quarter

- (6:42) UNI – Caleb Kamara 28-yard run, Rico Alvarenga-Servellon kick (Drive: 2 plays, 31 yards, 0:48; Northern Iowa 56–14)

Statistics	DRKE	UNI
First downs	21	25
Plays–yards	79–325	66–443
Rushes–yards	27–29	43–201
Passing yards	296	242
Passing: comp–att–int	31–52–3	16–23–0
Turnovers	5	0
Time of possession	25:24	34:36

Team	Category	Player	Statistics
Drake	Passing	Riley Warzynski	27/47, 241 yards, 2 TD, 3 INT
Drake	Rushing	Braylon Wilson	6 carries, 19 yards
Drake	Receiving	Mitchell January	5 receptions, 75 yards, TD
Northern Iowa	Passing	Jaxon Dailey	16/23, 242 yards, 3 TD
Northern Iowa	Rushing	Caleb Kamara	4 carries, 49 yards, TD
Northern Iowa	Receiving	Brady McCullough	4 receptions, 69 yards, 3 TD

=== at No. 18 (FBS) Iowa ===
Northern Iowa Panthers (1–1) at No. 18 (FBS) Iowa Hawkeyes (2–0) – Game summary

Quarter	1	2	3	4	Total
Panthers	0	0	0	0	0
No. 18 (FBS) Hawkeyes	21	21	7	6	55

at Kinnick Stadium • Iowa City, Iowa

- Date: September 19
- Game time: 3:00 p.m.
- Game weather: 76 °F (24 °C), Cloudy, Wind S 8 mph (13 km/h)
- Game attendance: 69,250
- Referee: Tim O'Dey
- TV announcers (FS1): Jack Kizer and Mark Helfrich

Game information

First quarter

- 11:11 IOWA – Nathan McNeil 2-yard run (Caden Buhr kick) (Drive: 8 plays, 75 yards, 3:49; Iowa 7–0)
- 5:48 IOWA – Braeden Jackson 24-yard pass from Hank Brown (Caden Buhr kick) (Drive: 6 plays, 78 yards, 3:04; Iowa 14–0)
- 0:24 IOWA – Xavier Williams 48-yard run (Caden Buhr kick) (Drive: 4 plays, 90 yards, 2:01; Iowa 21–0)

Second quarter

- 12:59 IOWA – Addison Ostrenga 14-yard pass from Hank Brown (Caden Buhr kick) (Drive: 2 plays, 37 yards, 0:57; Iowa 28–0)
- 10:06 IOWA – Xavier Williams 16-yard run (Caden Buhr kick) (Drive: 3 plays, 58 yards, 1:05; Iowa 35–0)
- 0:46 IOWA – Nathan McNeil 12-yard run (Caden Buhr kick) (Drive: 8 plays, 90 yards, 1:34; Iowa 42–0)

Third quarter

- 7:03 IOWA – Xavier Williams 37-yard run (Caden Buhr kick) (Drive: 5 plays, 66 yards, 2:41; Iowa 49–0)

Fourth quarter

- 12:37 IOWA – Braeden Jackson 62-yard run (Caden Buhr PAT blocked) (Drive: 2 plays, 65 yards, 0:58; Iowa 55–0)

Statistics	UNI	IOWA
First downs	9	32
Plays–yards	58–155	64–640
Rushes–yards	25–53	41–422
Passing yards	102	218
Passing: comp–att–int	14–33–2	18–23–0
Turnovers	2	0
Time of possession	27:45	32:15

Team	Category	Player	Statistics
Northern Iowa	Passing	Jaxon Dailey	11/27, 91 yards, 2 INT
Northern Iowa	Rushing	Caleb Kamara	7 carries, 21 yards
Northern Iowa	Receiving	Ayden Price	2 receptions, 32 yards
Iowa	Passing	Hank Brown	12/12, 153 yards, 2 TD
Iowa	Rushing	Xavier Williams	6 carries, 151 yards, 3 TD
Iowa	Receiving	Nathan McNeil	3 receptions, 37 yards

=== No. 3 Illinois State ===
No. 3 Illinois State Redbirds (4–0) at Northern Iowa Panthers (1–2) – Game summary

Quarter	1	2	3	4	Total
No. 3 Redbirds	7	0	7	7	21
Panthers	7	14	7	0	28

at UNI-Dome • Cedar Falls, Iowa

- Date: September 26
- Game time: 4:00 p.m.
- Game weather: Indoors
- Game attendance: 9,016
- TV: ESPN+

Game information

First quarter
Second quarter
Third quarter
Fourth quarter

Statistics	ILST	UNI
First downs	26	18
Plays–yards		
Rushes–yards	31-119	34-199
Passing yards	228	217
Passing: comp–att–int	30-47-0	13-17-0
Turnovers	1	0
Time of possession	30:57	29:03

Team	Category	Player	Statistics
Illinois State	Passing	Gage Roy	24/39, 193 yards, 2 TD
Illinois State	Rushing	Tyler Lofton	14 carries, 72 yards
Illinois State	Receiving	Dylan Lord	12 receptions, 88 yards, 1 TD
Northern Iowa	Passing	Jaxon Dailey	13/17, 217 yards, 2 TD
Northern Iowa	Rushing	Xavier Terrell	8 carries, 80 yards, 1 TD
Northern Iowa	Receiving	Taj Hughes	3 receptions, 80 yards

=== No. 4 North Dakota ===
No. 4 North Dakota Fighting Hawks (5–1) at Northern Iowa Panthers (2–2) – Game summary

Quarter	1	2	3	4	Total
No. 4 Fighting Hawks	0	0	0	0	0
Panthers	0	0	0	0	0

at UNI-Dome • Cedar Falls, Iowa

- Date: October 10
- Game time: 4:00 p.m.
- TV: ESPN+

Game information

First quarter
Second quarter
Third quarter
Fourth quarter

Statistics	UND	UNI
First downs		
Plays–yards		
Rushes–yards		
Passing yards		
Passing: comp–att–int		
Turnovers		
Time of possession		

Team	Category	Player	Statistics
North Dakota	Passing		
North Dakota	Rushing		
North Dakota	Receiving		
Northern Iowa	Passing		
Northern Iowa	Rushing		
Northern Iowa	Receiving		

=== at No. 6 Youngstown State ===
No. 19 Northern Iowa Panthers (3–2) at No. 6 Youngstown State Penguins (5–2) – Game summary

Quarter	1	2	3	4	Total
No. 19 Panthers	0	7	9	6	22
No. 6 Penguins	14	14	0	7	35

at Stambaugh Stadium • Youngstown, Ohio

- Date: October 17
- Game time: 5:00 p.m.
- Game weather: Sunny • Temperature: 49 °F (9 °C) • Wind: NW at 5 miles per hour (8.0 km/h)
- Game attendance: 10,284
- Referee: Gregory Gompf
- TV announcers (ESPN+): Drae Smith (play-by-play) and Chris Sammarone (analyst)

Game information

First quarter

- (14:48) YSU – Donald Barksdale 93-yard kickoff return, Andrew Lastovka kick (Youngstown State 7–0)
- (4:39) YSU – Antuan Gardner 2-yard run, Andrew Lastovka kick (Drive: 11 plays, 80 yards, 4:56; Youngstown State 14–0)

Second quarter

- (14:51) YSU – Lynn Wyche-El 42-yard pass from Beau Brungard, Andrew Lastovka kick (Drive: 7 plays, 80 yards, 2:54; Youngstown State 21–0)
- (7:24) YSU – Beau Brungard 1-yard run, Andrew Lastovka kick (Drive: 12 plays, 70 yards, 6:19; Youngstown State 21–0)
- (0:56) UNI – Kai Black 24-yard pass from Jaxon Dailey, Max Bartachek kick (Drive: 12 plays, 75 yards, 6:28; Youngstown State 28–7)

Third quarter

- (10:31) UNI – Brady McCullough 16-yard pass from Jaxon Dailey, Max Bartachek kick blocked (Drive: 9 plays, 75 yards, 4:29; Youngstown State 28–13)
- (5:30) UNI – Max Bartachek 45-yard field goal (Drive: 6 plays, 9 yards, 3:18; Youngstown State 28–16)

Fourth quarter

- (14:53) YSU – Bryan Hunt 16-yard pass from Beau Brungard, Andrew Lastovka kick (Drive: 11 plays, 58 yards, 5:37; Youngstown State 35–16)
- (3:59) UNI – Ayden Price 17-yard pass from Jaxon Dailey, Jaxon Dailey conversion pass failed (Drive: 15 plays, 87 yards, 3:51; Youngstown State 35–22)

Statistics	UNI	YSU
First downs	28	25
Plays–yards	72–371	64–420
Rushes–yards	23–53	37–180
Passing yards	318	240
Passing: comp–att–int	29–49–0	23–37–0
Turnovers	0	0
Time of possession	30:19	29:41

Team	Category	Player	Statistics
Northern Iowa	Passing	Jaxon Dailey	28/49, 318 yards, 3 TD
Northern Iowa	Rushing	Ben Gordon	4 carries, 45 yards
Northern Iowa	Receiving	Kai Black	3 receptions, 74 yards, TD
Youngstown State	Passing	Beau Brungard	23/37, 240 yards, 2 TD
Youngstown State	Rushing	Beau Brungard	17 carries, 80 yards, TD
Youngstown State	Receiving	Lynn Wyche-El	8 receptions, 106 yards, TD

=== at Southern Illinois ===
No. 21 Northern Iowa Panthers (3–3) at Southern Illinois Salukis (3–5) – Game summary

Quarter	1	2	3	4	Total
No. 21 Panthers	0	0	0	0	0
Salukis	0	0	0	0	0

at Saluki Stadium • Carbondale, Illinois

- Date: October 24
- Game time: 1:00 p.m.
- TV: ESPN+

Game information

First quarter
Second quarter
Third quarter
Fourth quarter

Statistics	UNI	SIU
First downs		
Plays–yards		
Rushes–yards		
Passing yards		
Passing: comp–att–int		
Turnovers		
Time of possession		

Team	Category	Player	Statistics
Northern Iowa	Passing		
Northern Iowa	Rushing		
Northern Iowa	Receiving		
Southern Illinois	Passing		
Southern Illinois	Rushing		
Southern Illinois	Receiving		

=== Indiana State ===
Indiana State Sycamores (2–6) at Northern Iowa Panthers (3–4) – Game summary

Quarter	1	2	3	4	Total
Sycamores	3	6	7	7	23
Panthers	3	14	7	21	45

at UNI-Dome • Cedar Falls, Iowa

- Date: October 31
- Game time: 1:00 p.m.
- Game weather: Indoor
- Game attendance: 7,320
- Referee: Jason Perkins
- TV announcers (ESPN+): Brad Wells (play-by-play) and Justin Surrency (analyst)

Game information

First quarter

- INST – Sebastian Lopez 22-yard field goal, 5:12. Sycamores 3–0. Drive: 14 plays, 76 yards, 5:56.
- UNI – Blake Pankratz 24-yard field goal, 0:23. Tied 3–3. Drive: 11 plays, 68 yards, 4:49.

Second quarter

- UNI – Christian Collins 15-yard run (Blake Pankratz kick), 8:43. Panthers 10–3. Drive: 2 plays, 40 yards, 0:29.
- INST – Keshon Singleton 18-yard pass from Elijah Owens, 4:45. Panthers 10–9. Drive: 9 plays, 50 yards, 3:58.
- UNI – Taj Hughes 12-yard pass from Jaxon Dailey (Blake Pankratz kick), 1:09. Panthers 17–9. Drive: 8 plays, 75 yards, 3:36.

Third quarter

- UNI – Xavier Terrell 9-yard run (Blake Pankratz kick), 3:47. Panthers 24–9. Drive: 5 plays, 77 yards, 2:24.
- INST – Max McCool 14-yard pass from Elijah Owens (Sebastian Lopez kick), 1:34. Panthers 24–16. Drive: 8 plays, 84 yards, 2:06.

Fourth quarter

- UNI – Christian Collins 30-yard run (Blake Pankratz kick), 13:13. Panthers 31–16. Drive: 8 plays, 75 yards, 3:21.
- INST – Elijah Owens 2-yard run (Sebastian Lopez kick), 8:49. Panthers 31–23. Drive: 13 plays, 75 yards, 4:24.
- UNI – Xavier Terrell 38-yard run (Blake Pankratz kick), 4:06. Panthers 38–23. Drive: 7 plays, 75 yards, 4:43.
- UNI – Calvin Jaworski 60-yard interception (Blake Pankratz kick), 2:34. Panthers 45–23.

Statistics	INST	UNI
First downs	31	24
Plays–yards	82–473	61–438
Rushes–yards	35–160	39–240
Passing yards	313	198
Passing: comp–att–int	27–47–1	12–22–1
Turnovers	3	1
Time of possession	29:54	30:06

Team	Category	Player	Statistics
Indiana State	Passing	Elijah Owens	27/47, 313 yards, 2 TD, INT
Indiana State	Rushing	Elijah Owens	24 carries, 122 yards, TD
Indiana State	Receiving	Jayden Reed	10 receptions, 137 yards
Northern Iowa	Passing	Jaxon Dailey	12/22, 198 yards, TD, INT
Northern Iowa	Rushing	Christian Collins	11 carries, 107 yards, 2 TD
Northern Iowa	Receiving	Brady McCullough	2 receptions, 83 yards

=== No. 5 South Dakota State ===
No. 5 South Dakota State Jackrabbits (7–2) at Northern Iowa Panthers (4–4) – Game summary

Quarter	1	2	3	4	Total
No. 5 Jackrabbits	0	0	0	0	0
Panthers	0	0	0	0	0

at UNI-Dome • Cedar Falls, Iowa

- Date: November 7
- Game time: 1:00 p.m.
- TV: ESPN+

Game information

First quarter
Second quarter
Third quarter
Fourth quarter

Statistics	SDST	UNI
First downs		
Plays–yards		
Rushes–yards		
Passing yards		
Passing: comp–att–int		
Turnovers		
Time of possession		

Team	Category	Player	Statistics
South Dakota State	Passing		
South Dakota State	Rushing		
South Dakota State	Receiving		
Northern Iowa	Passing		
Northern Iowa	Rushing		
Northern Iowa	Receiving		

=== at No. 10 South Dakota ===
Northern Iowa Panthers (4–5) at No. 10 South Dakota Coyotes (7–3) – Game summary

Quarter	1	2	3	4	Total
Panthers	0	0	0	0	0
No. 10 Coyotes	0	0	0	0	0

at DakotaDome • Vermillion, South Dakota

- Date: November 14
- Game time: 1:00 p.m.
- TV: ESPN+

Game information

First quarter
Second quarter
Third quarter
Fourth quarter

Statistics	UNI	SDAK
First downs		
Plays–yards		
Rushes–yards		
Passing yards		
Passing: comp–att–int		
Turnovers		
Time of possession		

Team	Category	Player	Statistics
Northern Iowa	Passing		
Northern Iowa	Rushing		
Northern Iowa	Receiving		
South Dakota	Passing		
South Dakota	Rushing		
South Dakota	Receiving		

=== at Murray State ===
Northern Iowa Panthers (4–6) at Murray State Racers (2–9) – Game summary

Quarter	1	2	3	4	Total
Panthers	0	0	0	0	0
Racers	0	0	0	0	0

at Roy Stewart Stadium • Murray, Kentucky

- Date: November 21
- Game time: 1:00 p.m.
- TV: ESPN+

Game information

First quarter
Second quarter
Third quarter
Fourth quarter

Statistics	UNI	MUR
First downs		
Plays–yards		
Rushes–yards		
Passing yards		
Passing: comp–att–int		
Turnovers		
Time of possession		

Team	Category	Player	Statistics
Northern Iowa	Passing		
Northern Iowa	Rushing		
Northern Iowa	Receiving		
Murray State	Passing		
Murray State	Rushing		
Murray State	Receiving		

== Rankings ==
Ranking movements Legend: ██ Increase in ranking ██ Decrease in ranking — = Not ranked RV = Received votes
	Week														
Poll	Pre	1	2	3	4	5	6	7	8	9	10	11	12	13	Final
STATS	—	—	—	—	—	RV	RV	19	21	RV	RV				
Coaches	—	—	—	—	—	RV	—	25	RV	—	RV				
