= 2026 Illinois State Redbirds football team =

American college football season

2026 Illinois State Redbirds football
- Conference: Missouri Valley Football Conference

Ranking
- STATS: No. 11
- FCS Coaches: No. 13
- Record: 8–4 (4–4 MVFC)
- Head coach: Brock Spack (18th season)
- Offensive coordinator: Mickey Turner (1st season)
- Defensive coordinator: Travis Niekamp (9th season)
- Home stadium: Hancock Stadium

2026 Missouri Valley Football Conference standings
	Conf.			Overall
Team	W		L	W		L
No. 3 South Dakota State $^	7	–	1	10	–	2
No. 6 Youngstown State ^	6	–	2	8	–	3
No. 7 South Dakota ^	6	–	2	9	–	3
No. 10 North Dakota ^	5	–	3	8	–	4
No. 11 Illinois State ^	4	–	4	8	–	4
Southern Illinois	3	–	5	5	–	7
Northern Iowa	3	–	5	4	–	7
Murray State	2	–	6	3	–	9
Indiana State	0	–	8	2	–	10
$ – Conference champion; ^ – FCS playoff participant; As of November 22, 2026; Rankings from STATS Poll

The 2026 Illinois State Redbirds football team represents Illinois State University as a member of the Missouri Valley Football Conference (MVFC) during the 2026 NCAA Division I FCS football season. The Redbirds are led by 18th-year head coach Brock Spack and play home games at Hancock Stadium in Normal, Illinois.

== Preseason ==
=== MVFC poll ===
The Missouri Valley Football Conference released its preseason poll on July 14, 2026, voted on by league athletic directors, coaches, and media members. The Redbirds were predicted to finish second in the conference.

== Schedule ==
Date	Time	Opponent	Rank	Site	TV	Result	Attendance
August 29	6:00 p.m.	St. Francis (IL)*	No. 4	Hancock Stadium; Normal, IL	ESPN+	W 76–0	9,072
September 5	6:00 p.m.	at Western Illinois*	No. 4	Hanson Field; Macomb, IL	ESPN+	W 41–10	2,716
September 12	6:00 p.m.	at Northern Illinois*	No. 5	Huskie Stadium; DeKalb, IL	MW+	W 28–24	17,582
September 19	2:00 p.m.	Eastern Illinois*	No. 5	Hancock Stadium; Normal, IL (Mid-America Classic)	ESPN+	W 49–13	11,589
September 26	4:00 p.m.	at Northern Iowa	No. 3	UNI-Dome; Cedar Falls, IA	ESPN+	L 21–28	9,016
October 3	6:00 p.m.	No. 2 South Dakota State	No. 10	Hancock Stadium; Normal, IL	ESPN+	L 14–31	10,171
October 17	3:00 p.m.	at Southern Illinois	No. 13	Saluki Stadium; Carbondale, IL	ESPNU	W 35–14	9,086
October 24	2:00 p.m.	Indiana State^{†}	No. 10	Hancock Stadium; Normal, IL	ESPN+	W 17–10	11,280
October 31	1:00 p.m.	Murray State	No. 10	Hancock Stadium; Normal, IL	ESPN+	W 35–14	6,083
November 7	1:00 p.m.	at No. 11 North Dakota	No. 10	Alerus Center; Grand Forks, ND	ESPN+	L 21–49	10,046
November 14	3:30 p.m.	at No. 3 Youngstown State	No. 15	Stambaugh Stadium; Youngstown, OH	ESPN+	W 34–33	7,886
November 21	12:00 p.m.	No. 7 South Dakota	No. 11	Hancock Stadium; Normal, IL	ESPN+	L 3–10	7,019
*Non-conference game; ^{†}Homecoming; Rankings from STATS Poll released prior to the game; All times are in Central time

== Game summaries ==
All times in Central time

=== St. Francis (IL) (NAIA) ===
St. Francis (IL) Fighting Saints (NAIA) (0–0) at No. 4 Illinois State Redbirds (0–0) – Game summary

Quarter	1	2	3	4	Total
Fighting Saints (NAIA)	0	0	0	0	0
No. 4 Redbirds	20	28	21	7	76

at Hancock Stadium, Normal, IL

- Date: August 29, 2026
- Game time: 6:00 p.m.
- Game weather: Cloudy • Temperature: 79 °F (26 °C) • Wind: S at 9 miles per hour (14 km/h)
- Game attendance: 9,072
- Referee: Jason Berg
- TV announcers (ESPN+): Kurt Pegler and Clay Harbor

Game information

First quarter

- ILST – Victor Dawson 1-yard run (Michael Cosentino kick failed), 11:04. Redbirds 6–0. Drive: 6 plays, 50 yards, 2:08.
- ILST – Seth Glatz 53-yard run (Michael Cosentino kick), 6:54. Redbirds 13–0. Drive: 4 plays, 62 yards, 1:22.
- ILST – Dylan Lord 1-yard pass from Gage Roy (Michael Cosentino kick), 3:10. Redbirds 20–0. Drive: 4 plays, 38 yards, 1:23.

Second quarter

- ILST – Max Ziebarth 6-yard pass from Gage Roy (Michael Cosentino kick), 14:27. Redbirds 27–0. Drive: 7 plays, 56 yards, 2:45.
- ILST – Stevan Gavric 4-yard pass from Beckham Pellant (Michael Cosentino kick), 12:05. Redbirds 34–0. Drive: 2 plays, 19 yards, 0:37.
- ILST – Tyler Lofton 85-yard run (Michael Cosentino kick), 5:47. Redbirds 41–0. Drive: 1 play, 85 yards, 0:13.
- ILST – Dylan Lord 48-yard pass from Beckham Pellant (Michael Cosentino kick), 1:51. Redbirds 48–0. Drive: 4 plays, 90 yards, 1:34.

Third quarter

- ILST – Tyler Lofton 9-yard pass from Gage Roy (Drew Drzonek kick), 11:44. Redbirds 55–0. Drive: 6 plays, 45 yards, 3:08.
- ILST – Tyler Lofton 9-yard run (Drew Drzonek kick), 10:15. Redbirds 62–0. Drive: 1 play, 9 yards, 0:06.
- ILST – Travis Stamm 3-yard pass from Chase Kwiatkowski (Casey Roney kick), 5:37. Redbirds 69–0. Drive: 4 plays, 42 yards, 1:58.

Fourth quarter

- ILST – Albert Gooden III 7-yard run (Casey Roney kick), 3:36. Redbirds 76–0. Drive: 4 plays, 41 yards, 1:21.

Statistics	SFIL	ILST
First downs	9	20
Plays–yards	57–120	55–589
Rushes–yards	37–14	31–353
Passing yards	106	236
Passing: comp–att–int	9–20–1	21–24–0
Turnovers	3	0
Time of possession	33:57	26:03

Team	Category	Player	Statistics
St. Francis (IL)	Passing	Jonny Sorensen	8/18, 103 yards, INT
St. Francis (IL)	Rushing	Jonny Sorensen	16 carries, 22 yards
St. Francis (IL)	Receiving	Mason Hackman	4 receptions, 83 yards
Illinois State	Passing	Beckham Pellant	6/6, 114 yards, 2 TD
Illinois State	Rushing	Tyler Lofton	5 carries, 119 yards, 2 TD
Illinois State	Receiving	Dylan Lord	3 receptions, 69 yards, 2 TD

=== at Western Illinois ===
No. 4 Illinois State Redbirds (1–0) at Western Illinois Leathernecks (1–0) – Game summary

Quarter	1	2	3	4	Total
No. 4 Redbirds	17	10	7	7	41
Leathernecks	0	3	0	7	10

at Hanson Field, Macomb, IL

- Date: September 5, 2026
- Game time: 6:00 p.m.
- Game weather: Sunny
- Game attendance: 2,716
- Referee: Drew Myers
- TV: ESPN+

Game information

First quarter

- ILST – Michael Cosentino 30-yard field goal, 10:29. Redbirds 3–0. Drive: 13 plays, 62 yards, 4:26.
- ILST – Alex Herrera 23-yard pass from Beckham Pellant (Michael Cosentino kick), 4:41. Redbirds 10–0. Drive: 13 plays, 85 yards, 4:55.
- ILST – Seth Glatz 2-yard run (Michael Cosentino kick), 0:13. Redbirds 17–0. Drive: 6 plays, 46 yards, 2:42.

Second quarter

- WIU – Ronan Culkin 22-yard field goal, 9:42. Redbirds 17–3. Drive: 14 plays, 80 yards, 5:26.
- ILST – Stevan Gavric 36-yard pass from Gage Roy (Michael Cosentino kick), 5:24. Redbirds 24–3. Drive: 10 plays, 75 yards, 4:18.
- ILST – Michael Cosentino 29-yard field goal, 0:26. Redbirds 27–3. Drive: 4 plays, -1 yard, 1:13.

Third quarter

- ILST – Victor Dawson 1-yard run (Michael Cosentino kick), 10:23. Redbirds 34–3. Drive: 7 plays, 61 yards, 2:51.

Fourth quarter

- ILST – Victor Dawson 6-yard run (Michael Cosentino kick), 13:38. Redbirds 41–3. Drive: 5 plays, 65 yards, 2:07.
- WIU – Cason Carswell 3-yard run (Ronan Culkin kick), 7:06. Redbirds 41–10. Drive: 8 plays, 73 yards, 3:43.

Statistics	ILST	WIU
First downs	29	15
Plays–yards	82–496	63–315
Rushes–yards	47–239	23–52
Passing yards	257	263
Passing: comp–att–int	16–35–1	23–40–1
Turnovers	1	1
Time of possession	34:11	25:49

Team	Category	Player	Statistics
Illinois State	Passing	Beckham Pellant	8/22, 132 yards, TD, INT
Illinois State	Rushing	Chase Kwiatkowski	4 carries, 76 yards
Illinois State	Receiving	Dylan Lord	5 receptions, 72 yards
Western Illinois	Passing	Cason Carswell	9/18, 140 yards
Western Illinois	Rushing	Josh Robinson	5 carries, 22 yards
Western Illinois	Receiving	Christian Anaya	4 receptions, 78 yards

=== at Northern Illinois (FBS) ===
No. 5 Illinois State Redbirds (2–0) at Northern Illinois Huskies (FBS) (0–1) – Game summary

Quarter	1	2	3	4	Total
No. 5 Redbirds	14	7	0	7	28
Huskies (FBS)	0	17	0	7	24

at Huskie Stadium, DeKalb, IL

- Date: September 12, 2026
- Game time: 6:00 p.m.
- Game weather: Sunny • Temperature: 78 °F (26 °C) • Wind: NE at 11 miles per hour (18 km/h)
- Game attendance: 17,582
- Referee: Marcus Thornton
- TV: MW+

Game information

First quarter

- ILST – Jack Oliver 39-yard interception return (Michael Cosentino kick), 12:41. Redbirds 7–0.
- ILST – Chase Kwiatkowski 14-yard run (Michael Cosentino kick), 6:27. Redbirds 14–0. Drive: 9 plays, 57 yards, 4:56.

Second quarter

- ILST – Dylan Lord 6-yard pass from Gage Roy (Michael Cosentino kick), 14:52. Redbirds 21–0. Drive: 10 plays, 60 yards, 4:10.
- NIU – Andruw Ellis 30-yard interception return (JJ Schlenhardt kick), 12:39. Redbirds 21–7.
- NIU – JJ Schlenhardt 40-yard field goal, 6:32. Redbirds 21–10. Drive: 9 plays, 38 yards, 4:40.
- NIU – DeAree Rogers 2-yard pass from Taron Dickens (JJ Schlenhardt kick), 0:00. Redbirds 21–17. Drive: 13 plays, 65 yards, 3:03.

Third quarter

- No scoring plays.

Fourth quarter

- NIU – Telly Johnson Jr. 1-yard run (JJ Schlenhardt kick), 7:24. Huskies 24–21. Drive: 8 plays, 78 yards, 4:13.
- ILST – Alex Herrera 16-yard pass from Gage Roy (Michael Cosentino kick), 1:53. Redbirds 28–24. Drive: 11 plays, 75 yards, 5:31.

Statistics	ILST	NIU
First downs	19	20
Plays–yards	63–254	66–308
Rushes–yards	36–101	36–112
Passing yards	153	196
Passing: comp–att–int	21–27–2	23–30–2
Turnovers	2	2
Time of possession	31:16	28:44

Team	Category	Player	Statistics
Illinois State	Passing	Gage Roy	20/23, 146 yards, 2 TD
Illinois State	Rushing	Victor Dawson	12 carries, 46 yards
Illinois State	Receiving	Dylan Lord	8 receptions, 62 yards, TD
Northern Illinois	Passing	Taron Dickens	22/27, 193 yards, TD, INT
Northern Illinois	Rushing	Telly Johnson Jr.	22 carries, 83 yards, TD
Northern Illinois	Receiving	DeAree Rogers	11 receptions, 74 yards, TD

=== Eastern Illinois (Mid-America Classic) ===
Eastern Illinois Panthers (1–2) at No. 5 Illinois State Redbirds (3–0) – Game summary

Quarter	1	2	Total
Panthers			0
No. 5 Redbirds			0

at Hancock Stadium, Normal, IL

- Date: September 19, 2026
- Game time: 2:00 p.m.
- Game weather: TBD
- TV: ESPN+

Game information

First quarter
Second quarter
Third quarter
Fourth quarter

Statistics	EIU	ILST
First downs		
Plays–yards		
Rushes–yards		
Passing yards		
Passing: comp–att–int		
Turnovers		
Time of possession		

Team	Category	Player	Statistics
Eastern Illinois	Passing		
Eastern Illinois	Rushing		
Eastern Illinois	Receiving		
Illinois State	Passing		
Illinois State	Rushing		
Illinois State	Receiving		

=== at Northern Iowa ===
No. 3 Illinois State Redbirds (4–0) at Northern Iowa Panthers (1–2) – Game summary

Quarter	1	2	Total
No. 3 Redbirds			0
Panthers			0

at UNI-Dome, Cedar Falls, IA

- Date: September 26, 2026
- Game time: 4:00 p.m.
- Game weather: Indoors; 70 °F (21 °C)
- TV: ESPN+

Game information

First quarter
Second quarter
Third quarter
Fourth quarter

Statistics	ILST	UNI
First downs		
Plays–yards		
Rushes–yards		
Passing yards		
Passing: comp–att–int		
Turnovers		
Time of possession		

Team	Category	Player	Statistics
Illinois State	Passing		
Illinois State	Rushing		
Illinois State	Receiving		
Northern Iowa	Passing		
Northern Iowa	Rushing		
Northern Iowa	Receiving		

=== No. 2 South Dakota State ===
No. 2 South Dakota State Jackrabbits (4–1) at No. 10 Illinois State Redbirds (4–1) – Game summary

Quarter	1	2	Total
No. 2 Jackrabbits			0
No. 10 Redbirds			0

at Hancock Stadium, Normal, IL

- Date: October 3, 2026
- Game time: 6:00 p.m.
- Game weather: TBD
- TV: ESPN+

Game information

First quarter
Second quarter
Third quarter
Fourth quarter

Statistics	SDST	ILST
First downs		
Plays–yards		
Rushes–yards		
Passing yards		
Passing: comp–att–int		
Turnovers		
Time of possession		

Team	Category	Player	Statistics
South Dakota State	Passing		
South Dakota State	Rushing		
South Dakota State	Receiving		
Illinois State	Passing		
Illinois State	Rushing		
Illinois State	Receiving		

=== at Southern Illinois ===
No. 13 Illinois State Redbirds (4–2) at Southern Illinois Salukis (3–3) – Game summary

Quarter	1	2	Total
No. 13 Redbirds			0
Salukis			0

at Saluki Stadium, Carbondale, IL

- Date: October 17, 2026
- Game time: 3:00 p.m.
- Game weather: TBD
- TV: ESPNU

Game information

First quarter
Second quarter
Third quarter
Fourth quarter

Statistics	ILST	SIU
First downs		
Plays–yards		
Rushes–yards		
Passing yards		
Passing: comp–att–int		
Turnovers		
Time of possession		

Team	Category	Player	Statistics
Illinois State	Passing		
Illinois State	Rushing		
Illinois State	Receiving		
Southern Illinois	Passing		
Southern Illinois	Rushing		
Southern Illinois	Receiving		

=== Indiana State ===
Indiana State Sycamores (2–5) at No. 10 Illinois State Redbirds (5–2) – Game summary

Quarter	1	2	3	4	Total
Sycamores	7	0	0	3	10
No. 10 Redbirds	3	14	0	0	17

at Hancock Stadium, Normal, IL

- Date: October 24, 2026
- Game time: 2:00 p.m.
- Game weather: Sunny • Temperature: 73 °F (23 °C) • Wind: SE at 7 miles per hour (11 km/h)
- Game attendance: 11,280
- Referee: Jason Berg
- TV: ESPN+

Game information

First quarter

- INST – Jayden Reed 8-yard pass from Brady Allen (Sebastian Lopez kick), 9:11. Sycamores 7–0. Drive: 10 plays, 77 yards, 3:34.
- ILST – Michael Cosentino 22-yard field goal, 3:30. Sycamores 7–3. Drive: 13 plays, 70 yards, 5:41.

Second quarter

- ILST – Victor Dawson 3-yard run (Michael Cosentino kick), 10:04. Redbirds 10–7. Drive: 15 plays, 83 yards, 6:48.
- ILST – Key Crowell 48-yard interception (Michael Cosentino kick), 8:13. Redbirds 17–7.

Third quarter

No scoring plays

Fourth quarter

- INST – Sebastian Lopez 23-yard field goal, 7:47. Redbirds 17–10. Drive: 12 plays, 55 yards, 4:57.

Statistics	INST	ILST
First downs	21	20
Plays–yards	73–359	73–285
Rushes–yards	28–80	41–111
Passing yards	279	174
Passing: comp–att–int	25–45–1	16–32–2
Turnovers	3	3
Time of possession	27:15	32:45

Team	Category	Player	Statistics
Indiana State	Passing	Brady Allen	25/45, 279 yards, TD, INT
Indiana State	Rushing	Max McCool	19 carries, 84 yards
Indiana State	Receiving	Jayden Reed	9 receptions, 98 yards, TD
Illinois State	Passing	Beckham Pellant	16/32, 174 yards, 2 INT
Illinois State	Rushing	Victor Dawson	21 carries, 57 yards, TD
Illinois State	Receiving	Ethan Loss	5 receptions, 58 yards

=== Murray State ===
Murray State Racers (1–7) at No. 10 Illinois State Redbirds (6–2) – Game summary

Quarter	1	2	Total
Racers			0
No. 10 Redbirds			0

at Hancock Stadium, Normal, IL

- Date: October 31, 2026
- Game time: 1:00 p.m.
- Game weather: TBD
- TV: ESPN+

Game information

First quarter
Second quarter
Third quarter
Fourth quarter

Statistics	MUR	ILST
First downs		
Plays–yards		
Rushes–yards		
Passing yards		
Passing: comp–att–int		
Turnovers		
Time of possession		

Team	Category	Player	Statistics
Murray State	Passing		
Murray State	Rushing		
Murray State	Receiving		
Illinois State	Passing		
Illinois State	Rushing		
Illinois State	Receiving		

=== at No. 11 North Dakota ===
No. 10 Illinois State Redbirds (7–2) at No. 11 North Dakota Fighting Hawks (6–4) – Game summary

Quarter	1	2	Total
No. 10 Redbirds			0
No. 11 Fighting Hawks			0

at Alerus Center, Grand Forks, ND

- Date: November 7, 2026
- Game time: 1:00 p.m.
- Game weather: Indoors; 70 °F (21 °C)
- TV: ESPN+

Statistics	ILST	UND
First downs		
Plays–yards		
Rushes–yards		
Passing yards		
Passing: comp–att–int		
Turnovers		
Time of possession		

Team	Category	Player	Statistics
Illinois State	Passing		
Illinois State	Rushing		
Illinois State	Receiving		
North Dakota	Passing		
North Dakota	Rushing		
North Dakota	Receiving		

=== at No. 3 Youngstown State ===
No. 15 Illinois State Redbirds (7–3) at No. 3 Youngstown State Penguins (8–2) – Game summary

Quarter	1	2	3	4	Total
No. 15 Redbirds	0	14	0	20	34
No. 3 Penguins	7	3	14	9	33

at Stambaugh Stadium, Youngstown, OH

- Date: November 14, 2026
- Game time: 3:30 p.m.
- Game weather: Rain • Temperature: 40 °F (4 °C) • Wind: NW at 10 miles per hour (16 km/h)
- Game attendance: 7,886
- Referee: Jason Perkins
- TV announcers (ESPN+): Ben Wilson (play-by-play)

Game information

First quarter

- (6:28) YSU – Beau Brungard 3-yard run, Andrew Lastovka kick (Drive: 13 plays, 65 yards, 6:59; Youngstown State 7–0)

Second quarter

- (14:13) ILST – Victor Dawson 7-yard run, Michael Cosentino kick (Drive: 11 plays, 75 yards, 7:15; Tied 7–7)
- (3:08) ILST – Seth Glatz 20-yard run, Michael Cosentino kick (Drive: 9 plays, 74 yards, 4:40; Illinois State 14–7)
- (0:34) YSU – Andrew Lastovka 26-yard field goal (Drive: 9 plays, 43 yards, 2:35; Illinois State 14–10)

Third quarter

- (9:27) YSU – Beau Brungard 4-yard run, Andrew Lastovka kick (Drive: 12 plays, 65 yards, 5:33; Youngstown State 17–14)
- (2:18) YSU – Jaden Gilbert 7-yard run, Andrew Lastovka kick (Drive: 11 plays, 70 yards, 4:42; Youngstown State 24–14)

Fourth quarter

- (13:40) YSU – Andrew Lastovka 45-yard field goal (Drive: 6 plays, 11 yards, 2:32; Youngstown State 27–14)
- (11:31) ILST – Mar'Quan Gary 27-yard pass from Beckham Pellant, Michael Cosentino kick (Drive: 5 plays, 75 yards, 2:09; Youngstown State 27–21)
- (3:29) ILST – Seth Glatz 7-yard run, Michael Cosentino kick (Drive: 12 plays, 89 yards, 7:06; Illinois State 28–27)
- (2:13) YSU – Bryan Hunt 59-yard pass from Beau Brungard, Fresh Walters conversion pass failed (Drive: 3 plays, 75 yards, 1:16; Youngstown State 33–28)
- (0:09) ILST – Beckham Pellant 2-yard run, Beckham Pellant conversion pass failed (Drive: 12 plays, 73 yards, 1:57; Illinois State 34–33)

Statistics	ILST	YSU
First downs	25	20
Plays–yards	66–398	65–377
Rushes–yards	257	199
Passing yards	141	178
Passing: comp–att–int	17–26–0	15–27–1
Turnovers	1	1
Time of possession	31:25	28:35

Team	Category	Player	Statistics
Illinois State	Passing	Beckham Pellant	17/26, 141 yards, TD
Illinois State	Rushing	Seth Glatz	25 carries, 176 yards, 2 TD
Illinois State	Receiving	Dylan Lord	6 receptions, 45 yards
Youngstown State	Passing	Beau Brungard	15/27, 178 yards, TD, INT
Youngstown State	Rushing	Beau Brungard	16 carries, 88 yards, 2 TD
Youngstown State	Receiving	Bryan Hunt	1 reception, 59 yards, TD

=== No. 7 South Dakota ===
No. 7 South Dakota Coyotes (8–3) at No. 11 Illinois State Redbirds (8–3) – Game summary

Quarter	1	2	Total
No. 7 Coyotes			0
No. 11 Redbirds			0

at Hancock Stadium, Normal, IL

- Date: November 21, 2026
- Game time: 12:00 p.m.
- Game weather: TBD
- TV: ESPN+

Game information

First quarter
Second quarter
Third quarter
Fourth quarter

Statistics	SDAK	ILST
First downs		
Plays–yards		
Rushes–yards		
Passing yards		
Passing: comp–att–int		
Turnovers		
Time of possession		

Team	Category	Player	Statistics
South Dakota	Passing		
South Dakota	Rushing		
South Dakota	Receiving		
Illinois State	Passing		
Illinois State	Rushing		
Illinois State	Receiving		

== Ranking movements ==
Ranking movements Legend: ██ Increase in ranking ██ Decrease in ranking т = Tied with team above or below ( ) = First-place votes
	Week														
Poll	Pre	1	2	3	4	5	6	7	8	9	10	11	12	13	Final
STATS	4	4	5	5	3 (1)	10	12	13	10	10	10	15	11		
Coaches	4	4	4	4	4т (1)	11	13	13	10	9	8	17	13		
