= Mountain Vista High School =

Public high school in Colorado, US

Location
- 10585 Mountain Vista Ridge; Highlands Ranch, Colorado 80126; United States; 39°31′21″N 104°57′57″W

Information
- Established: 2001 (25 years ago)
- School district: Douglas County RE-1
- CEEB code: 060747
- NCES School ID: 080345001748
- Principal: Robert Ceglie
- Teaching staff: 107.79 (on an FTE basis)
- Grades: 9–12
- Enrollment: 2,217 (2023–2024)
- Student to teacher ratio: 20.57
- Colors: Forest green, gold, white
- Athletics conference: CHSAA
- Mascot: Golden eagle
- Website: mvhs.dcsdk12.org

Mountain Vista High School is a public high school located in Highlands Ranch, Colorado. It is part of the Douglas County School District.

== History ==
Initially designated "High School No. 6" in the school district's long-range plans, Mountain Vista High School was named such in 2000. The original mascot for the school was set to be the "Sun Devils" with the colors of red and yellow. However, due to widespread protest by local Christian activists, the mascot was shortly changed to the "Golden Eagle" with the colors of green and gold. The school opened in August 2001 with 350 students and saw its first graduating class in 2005.

== Extracurricular activities ==
=== Athletics ===
Mountain Vista competes in 5A athletics.

The Mountain Vista Boys' Lacrosse team is a top contender in Colorado winning the state championship in 2021 and 2023.

In 2005, Mountain Vista girls' soccer team defeated Arapahoe High School for the 5A state title. They took state again in 2011.

In 2010, the field hockey team won the 5A state championship, beating Kent Denver 1-0.

The men's cross country team won the Colorado 5A State Cross Country Championships 4 consecutive years, from 2012 to 2015.

The men's swim and dive team, combined with Thunder Ridge, Rock Canyon, and Highlands Ranch High Schools, won the state championship in 2010.

The men's baseball team won the 5A state championship in 2021.

The women's flag football team would win CHSAA's inaugural championship for the sport in 2024, beating Arvada West High School.

=== Theatre ===
The America High School Theatre Festival has honored Stage Flight Theatre, and the production of Rosencrantz and Guildenstern Are Dead was selected by Colorado Thespians as the Main Stage performance at the 2007 Colorado Thespian Conference. Stage Flight Theatre also hosted and produced the first ever All-State Colorado Theatre production, The 25th Annual Putnam County Spelling Bee, in 2010.

== Notable alumni ==
- Austyn Modrzewski (Class of 2025) college football quarterback for the South Dakota Coyotes
- Jake Pemberton (Class of 2014), American-Israeli basketball player in the Israeli National League
- A. J. Schugel, MLB pitcher (Free Agent)
- Mallory Swanson, women's soccer player and US Olympian (2016 Olympic Games)
