= Austyn Modrzewski =

American football player

No. 1 – South Dakota Coyotes
- Position: Quarterback
- Class: Redshirt Freshman

Personal information
- Listed height: 6 ft 5 in (1.96 m)
- Listed weight: 215 lb (98 kg)

Career information
- High school: Mountain Vista (Highlands Ranch, Colorado)
- College: South Dakota (2025–present)
- Stats at ESPN

Austyn Modrzewski is an American college football quarterback for the South Dakota Coyotes.

== Early life ==
Modrzewski attended Mountain Vista High School in Highlands Ranch, Colorado. As a junior he passed for 3,675 yards with 41 touchdowns and was named the Colorado Gatorade Football Player of the Year. He was again named the Colorado Gatorade Football Player of the Year his senior year after passing 3,407 yards and 57 touchdowns. His 11,911 passing yards and 147 touchdowns were a Colorado state record.

== College career ==
After redshirting his first year at South Dakota in 2025, Modrzewski was named the starter for the 2026 season. In the first game of the season, he completed 16 of 20 passes for 304 yards and school-record tying six touchdown passes. He also rushed for 81 yards, including a 68-yard touchdown.
