= Beau Brungard =

American football player (born 2003)

No. 12 – Youngstown State Penguins
- Position: Quarterback
- Class: Redshirt Senior

Personal information
- Born: October 27, 2003 (age 23)
- Listed height: 6 ft 0 in (1.83 m)
- Listed weight: 215 lb (98 kg)

Career information
- High school: Springfield Local (New Middletown, Ohio)
- College: Youngstown State (2022–present)

Awards and highlights
- Walter Payton Award (2025); MVFC Offensive Player of the Year (2025); 2× First-team All-MVFC (2024, 2025)
- Stats at ESPN

Beau Brungard is an American college football quarterback for the Youngstown State Penguins. Brungard won the 2025 Walter Payton Award.

== Early life ==
Brungard grew up in New Middletown, Ohio and attended Springfield Local High School. He was twice named the Ohio Division VI Offensive Player of the Year. Beau finished his senior season passing for 1,779 yards with 22 touchdown passes and rushing for 1,754 yards and 32 touchdowns. Brungard committed to play college football at Youngstown State.

== College career ==
Brungard redshirted his true freshman season with the Youngstown State Penguins. He played in 13 games, all coming off the bench, as a redshirt freshman and completed 14 of 20 pass attempts for 108 yards and an interception and also rushed for 129 yards and three touchdowns on 28 carries. Brungard was named the Penguins' starting quarterback going into his redshirt sophomore season. He was named first-team All-Missouri Valley Football Conference (MVFC) as an all-purpose player at the end of the season after completing 209 of 314 pass attempts for 2,141 yards and 12 touchdowns with 11 interceptions and rushing for 998 yards and 16 touchdowns.

During his redshirt junior season (2025), Brungard set a program record for yards of offense in a game with 528 after passing for 328 yards and two touchdowns and rushing for 200 yards and three touchdowns in a 40–35 win over Illinois State. He was named the MVFC Offensive Player of the Year after passing for 3,230 yards and 26 touchdowns and rushing for an additional 1,486 yards with 27 touchdowns. Following the season, Brungard received multiple national honors. He was named a unanimous FCS All-American and won the Walter Payton Award, given annually to the most outstanding offensive player in the Football Championship Subdivision.

=== Statistics ===
College statistics
Season	Team	Games			Passing								Rushing			
Season	Team	GP	GS	Record	Cmp	Att	Pct	Yds	Avg	TD	Int	Rtg	Att	Yds	Avg	TD
2022	YSU	0	0	—	Redshirt (redshirt)											
2023	YSU	13	0	0–0	14	20	70.0	108	7.7	0	1	105.4	28	129	4.6	3
2024	YSU	12	12	4–8	209	314	66.6	2,141	10.2	12	11	129.4	159	998	6.3	16
2025	YSU	13	13	8–5	277	403	68.7	3,230	8.0	26	3	155.9	242	1,468	6.1	27
Career		38	25	12–13	500	737	67.8	5,479	7.4	38	15	143.2	429	2,595	6.0	46

== Personal life ==
Brungard's father, Mark, also played quarterback at Youngstown State and was the starting quarterback for the Penguins' 1993 and 1994 national championship teams.
