= List of South Dakota State Jackrabbits football seasons =

The following is a list of seasons completed by the South Dakota State Jackrabbits football team. The Jackrabbits compete in the Missouri Valley Football Conference at the NCAA Division I FCS level. Representing South Dakota State University in Brookings, South Dakota, SDSU has played their home games at the 19,300-seat Dana J. Dykhouse Stadium since 2016.

South Dakota State began playing football in 1889, competing as an independent. They joined the now-defunct North Central Intercollegiate Athletic Conference in 1922, competing as a member for 82 years at the NCAA Division II (formerly College Division) level. The Jackrabbits moved up to the FCS ranks in 2004, joining the Great West Conference, before finding their current home in the MVFC in 2008.

South Dakota State has claimed 18 conference titles in their history, including three in the Missouri Valley. The Jackrabbits won their first National Championship in 2022, defeating rival North Dakota State. After the season, longtime head coach John Stiegelmeier announced his retirement after 36 years coaching at the university. He was replaced by head coach Jimmy Rogers. who led the Jackrabbits to their second consecutive National Championship in 2023, defeating Montana. The current head coach, beginning with the 2025 season, is Dan Jackson.

== Seasons ==
Legend

† National champions
^{†} Conference champions
^ Bowl game berth / playoff result

List of South Dakota State Jackrabbits football seasons
| Season | Team | Head coach | Conference | Regular season results | | | | | | | Postseason results | Final ranking | |
| Season | Team | Head coach | Conference | Overall | | | Conference | | | | Bowl game/Playoff result | STATS/NCAA Poll (Note: Since Division I was split into subdivisions, the NCAA poll was the major poll used at the I-AA (FCS) level until 1992, when it was replaced by The Sports Network poll. Beginning in 2015, the FCS now uses the STATS poll.) | Coaches' Poll |
| Season | Team | Head coach | Conference | Win | Loss | Tie | Win | Loss | Tie | Finish | Bowl game/Playoff result | STATS/NCAA Poll | Coaches' Poll |
|---|---|---|---|---|---|---|---|---|---|---|---|---|---|
South Dakota State Jackrabbits
| 1889 | 1889 | No coach | Independent | 0 | 0 | 1 | | | | — | — | — | — |
| 1897 | 1897 | No coach | Independent | 0 | 1 | 0 | | | | — | — | — | — |
| 1898 | 1898 | No coach | Independent | 1 | 1 | 1 | | | | — | — | — | — |
| 1899 | 1899 | No coach | Independent | 3 | 1 | 0 | | | | — | — | — | — |
| 1900 | 1900 | Morrison | Independent | 4 | 1 | 0 | | | | — | — | — | — |
| 1901 | 1901 | Leon L. Gilkey | Independent | 3 | 2 | 0 | | | | — | — | — | — |
| 1902 | 1902 | No coach | Independent | 3 | 2 | 0 | | | | — | — | — | — |
| 1903 | 1903 | J. Harrison Werner | Independent | 1 | 2 | 0 | | | | — | — | — | — |
| 1904 | 1904 | William Blaine | Independent | 4 | 2 | 1 | | | | — | — | — | — |
| 1905 | 1905 | William Juneau | Independent | 2 | 3 | 0 | | | | — | — | — | — |
| 1906 | 1906 | William Juneau | Independent | 3 | 1 | 0 | | | | — | — | — | — |
| 1907 | 1907 | William Juneau | Independent | 5 | 2 | 0 | | | | — | — | — | — |
| 1908 | 1908 | William Juneau | Independent | 3 | 3 | 1 | | | | — | — | — | — |
| 1909 | 1909 | Jason M. Saunderson | Independent | 1 | 3 | 0 | | | | — | — | — | — |
| 1910 | 1910 | Jason M. Saunderson | Independent | 4 | 2 | 2 | | | | — | — | — | — |
| 1911 | 1911 | Fred Johnson | Independent | 4 | 4 | 0 | | | | — | — | — | — |
| 1912 | 1912 | Harry W. Ewing | Independent | 2 | 3 | 1 | | | | — | — | — | — |
| 1913 | 1913 | Harry W. Ewing | Independent | 5 | 3 | 0 | | | | — | — | — | — |
| 1914 | 1914 | Harry W. Ewing | Independent | 5 | 2 | 0 | | | | — | — | — | — |
| 1915 | 1915 | Harry W. Ewing | Independent | 5 | 1 | 1 | | | | — | — | — | — |
| 1916 | 1916 | Harry W. Ewing | Independent | 4 | 2 | 0 | | | | — | — | — | — |
| 1917 | 1917 | Harry W. Ewing | Independent | 5 | 1 | 0 | | | | — | — | — | — |
| 1918 | | Harry W. Ewing | Independent | | | No Games — World War I | | | | | | | |
| 1919 | 1919 | Charles A. West | | 4 | 1 | 1 | | | | — | — | — | — |
| 1920 | 1920 | Charles A. West | | 4 | 2 | 1 | | | | — | — | — | — |
| 1921 | 1921 | Charles A. West | | 7 | 1 | 0 | | | | — | — | — | — |
| 1922 | 1922^{†} | Charles A. West | North Central | 5 | 2 | 1 | 4 | 1 | 1 | 1st^{†} | — | — | — |
| 1923 | 1923 | Charles A. West | North Central | 3 | 4 | 0 | 2 | 3 | 0 | 4th | — | — | — |
| 1924 | 1924^{†} | Charles A. West | North Central | 6 | 1 | 0 | 5 | 0 | 0 | 1st^{†} | — | — | — |
| 1925 | 1925 | Charles A. West | North Central | 2 | 3 | 2 | 1 | 1 | 2 | 5th | — | — | — |
| 1926 | 1926^{†} | Charles A. West | North Central | 8 | 0 | 3 | 3 | 0 | 2 | 1st^{†} | — | — | — |
| 1927 | 1927 | Charles A. West | North Central | 5 | 3 | 1 | 2 | 2 | 0 | 3rd | — | — | — |
| 1928 | 1928 | Cy Kasper | North Central | 9 | 1 | 0 | 3 | 1 | 0 | 2nd | — | — | — |
| 1929 | 1929 | Cy Kasper | North Central | 5 | 4 | 1 | 2 | 1 | 1 | 2nd | — | — | — |
| 1930 | 1930 | Cy Kasper | North Central | 2 | 6 | 1 | 1 | 3 | 0 | 4th | — | — | — |
| 1931 | 1931 | Cy Kasper | North Central | 6 | 3 | 0 | 2 | 2 | 0 | 2nd | — | — | — |
| 1932 | 1932 | Cy Kasper | North Central | 2 | 5 | 1 | | 2 | 1 | 5th | — | — | — |
| 1933 | 1933^{†} | Cy Kasper | North Central | 6 | 3 | 0 | 4 | 0 | 0 | 1st^{†} | — | — | — |
| 1934 | 1934 | Red Threlfall | North Central | 6 | 4 | 0 | 2 | 2 | 0 | 4th | — | — | — |
| 1935 | 1935 | Red Threlfall | North Central | 4 | 4 | 1 | 1 | 3 | 1 | 3rd | — | — | — |
| 1936 | 1936 | Red Threlfall | North Central | 3 | 6 | 1 | 1 | 4 | 1 | 7th | — | — | — |
| 1937 | 1937 | Red Threlfall | North Central | 4 | 5 | 0 | 2 | 3 | 0 | 6th | — | — | — |
| 1938 | 1938 | Jack V. Barnes | North Central | 3 | 5 | 0 | 2 | 3 | 0 | 4th | — | — | — |
| 1939 | 1939^{†} | Jack V. Barnes | North Central | 7 | 2 | 0 | 4 | 1 | 0 | 1st^{†} | — | — | — |
| 1940 | 1940 | Jack V. Barnes | North Central | 4 | 3 | 1 | 2 | 3 | 1 | 5th | — | — | — |
| 1941 | 1941 | Thurlo McCrady | North Central | 2 | 5 | 0 | 1 | 5 | 0 | 7th | — | — | — |
| 1942 | 1942 | Thurlo McCrady | North Central | 4 | 4 | 0 | 3 | 3 | 0 | 4th | — | — | — |
| 1943 | | Thurlo McCrady | North Central | No Games — World War II | | | | | | | | | |
| 1944 | 1944 | Thurlo McCrady | North Central | 1 | 1 | 0 | | | | — | — | — | — |
| 1945 | 1945 | Thurlo McCrady | North Central | 1 | 4 | 1 | | | | — | — | — | — |
| 1946 | 1946 | Thurlo McCrady | North Central | 3 | 3 | 2 | 2 | 1 | 2 | 3rd | — | — | — |
| 1947 | 1947 | Ralph Ginn | North Central | 4 | 5 | 0 | 3 | 1 | 0 | 3rd | — | — | — |
| 1948 | 1948 | Ralph Ginn | North Central | 4 | 6 | 0 | 2 | 4 | 0 | 4th | — | — | — |
| 1949 | 1949^{†} | Ralph Ginn | North Central | 7 | 3 | 0 | 5 | 1 | 0 | 1st^{†} | — | — | — |
| 1950 | 1950^{†} | Ralph Ginn | North Central | 9 | 0 | 1 | 5 | 0 | 1 | 1st^{†} | — | — | — |
| 1951 | 1951 | Ralph Ginn | North Central | 8 | 1 | 1 | 4 | 1 | 1 | 2nd | — | — | — |
| 1952 | 1952 | Ralph Ginn | North Central | 4 | 4 | 1 | 3 | 2 | 1 | 3rd | — | — | — |
| 1953 | 1953^{†} | Ralph Ginn | North Central | 5 | 3 | 1 | 5 | 0 | 1 | 1st^{†} | — | — | — |
| 1954 | 1954^{†} | Ralph Ginn | North Central | 7 | 2 | 0 | 5 | 1 | 0 | 1st^{†} | — | — | — |
| 1955 | 1955^{†} | Ralph Ginn | North Central | 6 | 2 | 1 | 5 | 0 | 1 | 1st^{†} | — | — | — |
| 1956 | 1956 | Ralph Ginn | North Central | 4 | 5 | 0 | 3 | 3 | 0 | 4th | — | — | — |
| 1957 | 1957^{†} | Ralph Ginn | North Central | 6 | 2 | 1 | 5 | 0 | 1 | 1st^{†} | — | — | — |
| 1958 | 1958 | Ralph Ginn | North Central | 4 | 5 | 0 | 3 | 3 | 0 | 3rd | — | — | — |
| 1959 | 1959 | Ralph Ginn | North Central | 2 | 7 | 0 | 2 | 4 | 0 | 6th | — | — | — |
| 1960 | 1960 | Ralph Ginn | North Central | 5 | 4 | 1 | 2 | 3 | 1 | 4th | — | — | — |
| 1961 | 1961^{†} | Ralph Ginn | North Central | 8 | 2 | 0 | 5 | 1 | 0 | 1st^{†} | — | — | — |
| 1962 | 1962^{†} | Ralph Ginn | North Central | 7 | 2 | 1 | 5 | 0 | 1 | 1st^{†} | — | — | — |
| 1963 | 1963^{†} | Ralph Ginn | North Central | 9 | 1 | 0 | 6 | 0 | 0 | 1st^{†} | — | — | — |
| 1964 | 1964 | Ralph Ginn | North Central | 2 | 8 | 0 | 2 | 4 | 0 | 4th | — | — | — |
| 1965 | 1965 | Ralph Ginn | North Central | 1 | 8 | 1 | 1 | 4 | 1 | 5th | — | — | — |
| 1966 | 1966 | Ralph Ginn | North Central | 3 | 7 | 0 | 2 | 4 | 0 | 4th | — | — | — |
| 1967 | 1967 | Ralph Ginn | North Central | 4 | 6 | 0 | 2 | 4 | 0 | 4th | — | — | — |
| 1968 | 1968 | Ralph Ginn | North Central | 4 | 6 | 0 | 2 | 4 | 0 | 4th | — | — | — |
| 1969 | 1969 | Dave Kragthorpe | North Central | 3 | 7 | 0 | 3 | 3 | 0 | 3rd | — | — | — |
| 1970 | 1970 | Dean Pryor | North Central | 2 | 8 | 0 | 1 | 5 | 0 | 6th | — | — | — |
| 1971 | 1971 | Dean Pryor | North Central | 3 | 7 | 0 | 2 | 4 | 0 | 6th | — | — | — |
| 1972 | 1972 | John Gregory | North Central | 6 | 5 | 0 | 2 | 5 | 0 | 6th | — | — | — |
| 1973 (Note: The NCAA switched to its current divisional system in 1973. South Dakota State was classified as a Division II program (formerly College Division).) | 1973 | John Gregory | North Central | 5 | 5 | 1 | 2 | 4 | 1 | 4th | — | — | — |
| 1974 | 1974 | John Gregory | North Central | 6 | 5 | 0 | 4 | 3 | 0 | 3rd | — | — | — |
| 1975 | 1975 | John Gregory | North Central | 7 | 4 | 0 | 4 | 3 | 0 | 4th | — | — | — |
| 1976 | 1976 | John Gregory | North Central | 5 | 4 | 1 | 4 | 1 | 1 | 2nd | — | — | — |
| 1977 | 1977 | John Gregory | North Central | 5 | 4 | 1 | 3 | 3 | 1 | 4th | — | — | — |
| 1978 | 1978 | John Gregory | North Central | 5 | 6 | 0 | 3 | 3 | 0 | 3rd | — | — | — |
| 1979 | 1979 | John Gregory | North Central | 9 | 3 | 0 | 4 | 2 | 0 | 2nd | NCAA Division II Playoffs — First Round ^ | — | — |
| 1980 | 1980 | John Gregory | North Central | 3 | 8 | 0 | 1 | 5 | 0 | 7th | — | — | — |
| 1981 | 1981 | John Gregory | North Central | 4 | 6 | 0 | 2 | 5 | 0 | 6th | — | — | — |
| 1982 | 1982 | Wayne Haensel | North Central | 4 | 6 | 0 | 2 | 5 | 0 | 5th | — | — | — |
| 1983 | 1983 | Wayne Haensel | North Central | 5 | 6 | 0 | 3 | 6 | 0 | 8th | — | — | — |
| 1984 | 1984 | Wayne Haensel | North Central | 3 | 8 | 0 | 2 | 7 | 0 | 8th | — | — | — |
| 1985 | 1985 | Wayne Haensel | North Central | 7 | 4 | 0 | 7 | 2 | 0 | 2nd | — | — | — |
| 1986 | 1986 | Wayne Haensel | North Central | 6 | 5 | 0 | 5 | 4 | 0 | 4th | — | — | — |
| 1987 | 1987 | Wayne Haensel | North Central | 5 | 5 | 0 | 4 | 5 | 0 | 7th | — | — | — |
| 1988 | 1988 | Wayne Haensel | North Central | 7 | 4 | 0 | 6 | 3 | 0 | 2nd | — | — | — |
| 1989 | 1989 | Wayne Haensel | North Central | 5 | 6 | 0 | 3 | 6 | 0 | 8th | — | — | — |
| 1990 | 1990 | Wayne Haensel | North Central | 3 | 8 | 0 | 2 | 7 | 0 | 9th | — | — | — |
| 1991 | 1991 | Mike Daly | North Central | 7 | 3 | 0 | 5 | 3 | 0 | 4th | — | — | — |
| 1992 | 1992 | Mike Daly | North Central | 7 | 3 | 0 | 5 | 4 | 0 | 5th | — | — | — |
| 1993 | 1993 | Mike Daly | North Central | 7 | 4 | 0 | 6 | 3 | 0 | 3rd | — | — | — |
| 1994 | 1994 | Mike Daly | North Central | 7 | 4 | 0 | 5 | 4 | 0 | 5th | — | — | — |
| 1995 | 1995 | Mike Daly | North Central | 6 | 5 | 0 | 4 | 5 | 0 | 6th | — | — | — |
| 1996 (Note: Overtime rules were added for NCAA football in 1996, thereby eliminating ties.) | 1996 | Mike Daly | North Central | 7 | 4 | | 6 | 3 | | 2nd | — | — | — |
| 1997 | 1997 | John Stiegelmeier | North Central | 4 | 6 | | 3 | 6 | | 6th | — | — | — |
| 1998 | 1998 | John Stiegelmeier | North Central | 6 | 5 | | 5 | 4 | | 5th | — | — | — |
| 1999 | 1999 | John Stiegelmeier | North Central | 8 | 3 | | 6 | 3 | | 4th | — | — | — |
| 2000 | 2000 | John Stiegelmeier | North Central | 6 | 5 | | 4 | 5 | | 6th | — | — | — |
| 2001 | 2001 | John Stiegelmeier | North Central | 5 | 6 | | 4 | 4 | | 4th | — | — | — |
| 2002 | 2002 | John Stiegelmeier | North Central | 6 | 4 | | 4 | 4 | | 4th | — | — | — |
| 2003 | 2003 | John Stiegelmeier | North Central | 7 | 4 | | 4 | 3 | | 4th | — | — | — |
| 2004 (Note: South Dakota State moved up to the NCAA Division I FCS level in 2004.) | 2004 | John Stiegelmeier | Great West | 6 | 5 | | 2 | 3 | | 3rd | — | — | — |
| 2005 | 2005 | John Stiegelmeier | Great West | 6 | 5 | | 3 | 2 | | 3rd | — | — | — |
| 2006 | 2006 | John Stiegelmeier | Great West | 7 | 4 | | 3 | 1 | | 2nd | — | 22 | — |
| 2007 | 2007^{†} | John Stiegelmeier | Great West | 7 | 4 | | 4 | 0 | | 1st^{†} | — | 19 | 22 |
| 2008 | 2008 | John Stiegelmeier | Missouri Valley | 7 | 5 | | 6 | 2 | | 3rd | — | — | — |
| 2009 | 2009 | John Stiegelmeier | Missouri Valley | 8 | 4 | | 7 | 1 | | 2nd | NCAA Division I FCS Playoffs — First Round ^ | 11 | 11 |
| 2010 | 2010 | John Stiegelmeier | Missouri Valley | 5 | 6 | | 4 | 4 | | 3rd | — | — | — |
| 2011 | 2011 | John Stiegelmeier | Missouri Valley | 5 | 6 | | 4 | 4 | | 4th | — | — | — |
| 2012 | 2012 | John Stiegelmeier | Missouri Valley | 9 | 4 | | 6 | 2 | | 2nd | NCAA Division I FCS Playoffs — Second Round ^ | 14 | 17 |
| 2013 | 2013 | John Stiegelmeier | Missouri Valley | 9 | 5 | | 5 | 3 | | 2nd | NCAA Division I FCS Playoffs — Second Round ^ | 13 | 14 |
| 2014 | 2014 | John Stiegelmeier | Missouri Valley | 9 | 5 | | 5 | 3 | | 4th | NCAA Division I FCS Playoffs — Second Round ^ | 12 | 13 |
| 2015 | 2015 | John Stiegelmeier | Missouri Valley | 8 | 4 | | 5 | 3 | | 3rd | NCAA Division I FCS Playoffs — First Round ^ | 15 | 16 |
| 2016 | 2016^{†} | John Stiegelmeier | Missouri Valley | 9 | 4 | | 7 | 1 | | 1st^{†} | NCAA Division I FCS Playoffs — Quarterfinals ^ | 6 | 7 |
| 2017 | 2017 | John Stiegelmeier | Missouri Valley | 11 | 3 | | 6 | 2 | | 2nd | NCAA Division I FCS Playoffs — Semifinals ^ | 3 | 4 |
| 2018 | 2018 | John Stiegelmeier | Missouri Valley | 10 | 3 | | 6 | 2 | | 2nd | NCAA Division I FCS Playoffs — Semifinals ^ | 3 | 3 |
| 2019 | 2019 | John Stiegelmeier | Missouri Valley | 8 | 5 | | 5 | 3 | | 3rd | NCAA Division I FCS Playoffs — Second Round ^ | 10 | 12 |
| 2020 (Note: The Fall 2020 MVFC football season was delayed due to the COVID-19 pandemic, with league play resuming in a shortened Spring 2021 season.) | 2020^{†} | John Stiegelmeier | Missouri Valley | 8 | 2 | | 5 | 1 | | 1st^{†} | NCAA Division I FCS Playoffs — National Championship Game ^ | 2 | 2 |
| 2021 | 2021 | John Stiegelmeier | Missouri Valley | 11 | 4 | | 5 | 3 | | 3rd | NCAA Division I FCS Playoffs — Semifinals ^ | 4 | 5 |
| 2022 | 2022† | John Stiegelmeier | Missouri Valley | 14 | 1 | | 8 | 0 | | 1st^{†} | NCAA Division I FCS Playoffs — National Champions ^ | 1 | 1 |
| 2023 | 2023† | Jimmy Rogers | Missouri Valley | 15 | 0 | | 8 | 0 | | 1st^{†} | NCAA Division I FCS Playoffs — National Champions ^ | 1 | 1 |
| 2024 | 2024† | Jimmy Rogers | Missouri Valley | 12 | 3 | | 7 | 1 | | T–1st^{†} | NCAA Division I FCS Playoffs — Semifinals ^ | 3 | 3 |
| 2025 | 2025 | Dan Jackson | Missouri Valley | 9 | 5 | | 4 | 4 | | T–6th | NCAA Division I FCS Playoffs — Second Round ^ | 13 | 14 |
| Totals | | | | All-time: 665–483–38 (.577) | | | Conference: 367–273–24 (.571) | | | | Postseason: 19–13 (.594) | | |
