= 2026 South Dakota Coyotes football team =

American college football season

2026 South Dakota Coyotes football
- Conference: Missouri Valley Football Conference

Ranking
- STATS: No. 7
- FCS Coaches: No. 6
- Record: 9–3 (6–2 MVFC)
- Head coach: Matt Vitzthum (1st season)
- Offensive coordinator: Tim Morrison (2nd season)
- Offensive scheme: Pistol
- Defensive coordinator: Billy Kirch (2nd season)
- Base defense: Multiple
- Home stadium: DakotaDome

2026 Missouri Valley Football Conference standings
	Conf.			Overall
Team	W		L	W		L
No. 3 South Dakota State $^	7	–	1	10	–	2
No. 6 Youngstown State ^	6	–	2	8	–	3
No. 7 South Dakota ^	6	–	2	9	–	3
No. 10 North Dakota ^	5	–	3	8	–	4
No. 11 Illinois State ^	4	–	4	8	–	4
Southern Illinois	3	–	5	5	–	7
Northern Iowa	3	–	5	4	–	7
Murray State	2	–	6	3	–	9
Indiana State	0	–	8	2	–	10
$ – Conference champion; ^ – FCS playoff participant; As of November 22, 2026; Rankings from STATS Poll

The 2026 South Dakota Coyotes football team represents the University of South Dakota as a member of the Missouri Valley Football Conference (MVFC) during the 2026 NCAA Division I FCS football season. The Coyotes are led by first-year head coach Matt Vitzthum, who takes over for former coach Travis Johansen who left the program to become the defensive coordinator at Rutgers. Vitzthum was promoted from being the co-offensive coordinator last season, and will be assisted by second year offensive coordinator Tim Morrison and second year defensive coordinator Billy Kirch. The Coyotes play home games at the DakotaDome in Vermillion, South Dakota.

== Preseason ==
=== MVFC poll ===
The Missouri Valley Football Conference released its preseason poll on July 14, 2026, voted on by league athletic directors, coaches, and media members. The Coyotes were predicted to finish fifth in the conference.

== Schedule ==
Date	Time	Opponent	Rank	Site	TV	Result	Attendance
August 29	1:00 p.m.	Central Connecticut*	No. 12	DakotaDome; Vermillion, SD	Midco Sports/ESPN+	W 59–20	7,168
September 5	7:00 p.m.	at Northern Colorado*	No. 11	Nottingham Field; Greeley, CO	ESPN+	W 38–23	4,259
September 12	1:00 p.m.	Eastern Washington*	No. 11	DakotaDome; Vermillion, SD	ESPN+	W 41–23	7,535
September 19	9:00 p.m.	at Boise State*	No. 10	Albertsons Stadium; Boise, ID	CBSSN	L 24–38	34,428
September 26	1:00 p.m.	at No. 11 Youngstown State	No. 8	Stambaugh Stadium; Youngstown, OH	ESPN+	L 28–47	8,849
October 3	2:00 p.m.	Indiana State	No. 13	DakotaDome; Vermillion, SD	Midco Sports/ESPN+	W 44–14	9,002
October 10	1:00 p.m.	No. 25 Southern Illinois	No. 10	DakotaDome; Vermillion, SD	Midco Sports/ESPN+	W 31–10	7,012
October 17	4:00 p.m.	at Murray State	No. 9	Roy Stewart Stadium; Murray, KY	ESPN+	W 48–20	14,100
October 24	1:00 p.m.	No. 6 North Dakota	No. 8	DakotaDome; Vermillion, SD (Sitting Bull Trophy)	Midco Sports/ESPN+	W 26–23 ^{OT}	8,241
October 31	3:00 p.m.	at No. 5 South Dakota State	No. 6	Dana J. Dykhouse Stadium; Brookings, SD (rivalry)	ESPNU	L 21–31	18,902
November 14	1:00 p.m.	Northern Iowa	No. 10	DakotaDome; Vermillion, SD	Midco Sports/ESPN+	W 41–30	7,956
November 21	12:00 p.m.	at No. 11 Illinois State	No. 7	Hancock Stadium; Normal, IL	ESPN+	W 10–3	7,019
*Non-conference game; Rankings from STATS Poll released prior to the game; All times are in Central time

== Rankings ==
Ranking movements Legend: ██ Increase in ranking ██ Decrease in ranking
	Week														
Poll	Pre	1	2	3	4	5	6	7	8	9	10	11	12	13	Final
STATS	12	11	11	10	8	13	10	9	8	6	8	10	7		
Coaches	12	12	12	12	12	16	12	9	6	6	10	10	6		

== Game summaries ==
=== Central Connecticut ===
Central Connecticut Blue Devils (0–0) at No. 12 South Dakota Coyotes (0–0) – Game summary

Quarter	1	2	3	4	Total
Blue Devils	7	3	7	3	20
No. 12 Coyotes	14	28	14	3	59

at DakotaDome, Vermillion, SD

- Date: August 29, 2026
- Game time: 1:00 p.m.
- Game weather: Indoors • Temperature: 71 °F (22 °C)
- Game attendance: 7,168
- Referee: Grant Henderson
- TV announcers (Midco Sports, ESPN+, Midco+): David Brown and Andre Fields

Game information
First quarter
- CCSU – Isaac Stopke 3-yard run (Jack Hennessey kick), 7:40. Blue Devils 7–0. Drive: 10 plays, 63 yards, 5:48.
- SDAK – Brayden White 7-yard pass from Austyn Modrzewski (Bohdie Ing kick), 2:27. Tied 7–7. Drive: 8 plays, 69 yards, 5:07.
- SDAK – Austyn Modrzewksi 68-yard run (Bohdie Ing kick), 0:50. Coyotes 14–7. Drive: 1 play, 68 yards, 0:11.

Second quarter

- SDAK – Keyondray Jones-Logan 61-yard pass from Austyn Modrzewski (Bohdie Ing kick), 13:09. Coyotes 21–7. Drive: 2 plays, 64 yards, 0:55.
- CCSU – Jack Hennessey 37-yard field goal, 9:37. Coyotes 21–10. Drive: 6 plays, 14 yards, 2:55.
- SDAK – Carson Fletcher 24-yard run (Bohdie Ing kick), 7:23. Coyotes 28–10. Drive: 4 plays, 48 yards, 2:10.
- SDAK – Chris Herrin 23-yard pass from Austyn Modrzewski (Bohdie Ing kick), 3:27. Coyotes 35–10. Drive: 5 plays, 61 yards, 2:30.
- SDAK – Jesse Miller 2-yard pass from Austyn Modrzewski (Bohdie Ing kick), 0:07. Coyotes 42–10. Drive: 12 plays, 65 yards, 1:47.

Third quarter

- SDAK – Brayden White 38-yard pass from Austyn Modrzewski (Bohdie Ing kick), 11:52. Coyotes 49–10. Drive: 3 plays, 57 yards, 1:35.
- SDAK – Tennel Bryant 49-yard pass from Austyn Modrzewski (Bohdie Ing kick), 7:04. Coyotes 56–10. Drive: 5 plays, 80 yards, 2:45.
- CCSU – Michael Trovarelli 13-yard pass from Conner Kenyon (Jack Hennessey kick), 1:28. Coyotes 56–17. Drive: 12 plays, 74 yards, 5:30.

Fourth quarter

- SDAK – Bohdie Ing 30-yard field goal, 11:12. Coyotes 59–17. Drive: 11 plays, 63 yards, 5:16.
- CCSU – Jack Hennessey 36-yard field goal, 6:11. Coyotes 59–20. Drive: 10 plays, 46 yards, 4:58.

Statistics	CCSU	SDAK
First downs	15	25
Plays–yards	64–250	57–594
Rushes–yards	33–135	33–267
Passing yards	115	327
Passing: comp–att–int	16–31–0	18–24–0
Turnovers	0	1
Time of possession	32:36	27:24

Team	Category	Player	Statistics
Central Connecticut	Passing	Conner Kenyon	9/18, 81 yards, TD
Central Connecticut	Rushing	Brett Griffis	8 carries, 43 yards
Central Connecticut	Receiving	Michael Trovarelli	5 receptions, 45 yards, TD
South Dakota	Passing	Austyn Modrzewski	16/20, 304 yards, 6 TD
South Dakota	Rushing	Austyn Modrzewski	2 carries, 81 yards, TD
South Dakota	Receiving	Keyondray Jones-Logan	2 receptions, 103 yards, TD

=== at Northern Colorado ===
No. 11 South Dakota Coyotes (1–0) at Northern Colorado Bears (0–1) – Game summary

Quarter	1	2	3	4	Total
No. 11 Coyotes	7	14	7	10	38
Bears	7	3	7	6	23

at Nottingham Field, Greeley, CO

- Date: September 5, 2026
- Game time: 7:00 p.m.
- Game weather: Sunny
- Game attendance: 4,259
- Referee: Gregg Wilson
- TV announcers (ESPN+): Christian Saex and Matthew Gaitor

Game information
First quarter
- UNCO – Trey Olsen 54-yard pass from Kenny Lueth (Landon Richardson kick), 3:46. Bears 7–0. Drive: 8 plays, 85 yards, 4:59.
- SDAK – Tennel Bryant 46-yard run (Bohdie Ing kick), 2:42. Tied 7–7. Drive: 3 plays, 75 yards, 1:04.

Second quarter

- SDAK – Charles Pierce Jr. 11-yard run (Bohdie Ing kick), 14:01. Coyotes 14–7. Drive: 6 plays, 80 yards, 2:31.
- SDAK – Brayden White 10-yard pass from Austyn Modrzewski (Bohdie Ing kick), 0:40. Coyotes 21–7. Drive: 11 plays, 90 yards, 2:11.
- UNCO – Landon Richardson 39-yard field goal, 0:00. Coyotes 21–10. Drive: 7 plays, 54 yards, 0:40.

Third quarter

- UNCO – Justin Guin 7-yard run (Landon Richardson kick), 7:54. Coyotes 21–17. Drive: 12 plays, 75 yards, 7:06.
- SDAK – Charles Pierce Jr. 11-yard run (Bohdie Ing kick), 2:13. Coyotes 28–17. Drive: 10 plays, 73 yards, 5:34.

Fourth quarter

- SDAK – Bryce Cohoon 22-yard pass from Austyn Modrzewski (Bohdie Ing kick), 14:14. Coyotes 35–17. Drive: 3 plays, 33 yards, 1:21.
- SDAK – Bohdie Ing 25-yard field goal, 4:19. Coyotes 38–17. Drive: 7 plays, 31 yards, 2:56.
- UNCO – Jordan Herron 22-yard pass from Brayten Silbor (pass failed), 2:01. Coyotes 38–23. Drive: 10 plays, 75 yards, 2:18.

Statistics	SDAK	UNCO
First downs	22	22
Plays–yards	56–392	72–377
Rushes–yards	34–214	34–111
Passing yards	392	377
Passing: comp–att–int	14–22–0	24–38–0
Turnovers	0	0
Time of possession	24:16	35:44

Team	Category	Player	Statistics
South Dakota	Passing	Austyn Modrzewski	14/22, 178 yards, 2 TD
South Dakota	Rushing	Keyondray Jones-Logan	10 carries, 55 yards
South Dakota	Receiving	Brayden White	4 receptions, 48 yards, TD
Northern Colorado	Passing	Kenny Leuth	19/29, 201 yards, TD
Northern Colorado	Rushing	Mathias Price	10 carries, 34 yards
Northern Colorado	Receiving	Trey Olsen	3 receptions, 61 yards, TD

=== Eastern Washington ===
Eastern Washington Eagles (1–1) at No. 11 South Dakota Coyotes (2–0) – Game summary

Quarter	1	2	3	4	Total
Eagles	0	3	7	13	23
No. 11 Coyotes	7	10	14	10	41

at DakotaDome, Vermillion, SD

- Date: September 12, 2026
- Game time: 1:00 p.m.
- Game weather: Indoors • Temperature: 70 °F (21 °C)
- Game attendance: 7,535
- Referee: Carl Chapman
- TV announcers (ESPN+): Jay Elsen and Andre Fields

Game information
First quarter
- SDAK – Brayden White 8-yard pass from Austyn Modrzewski (Bohdie Ing kick), 6:11. Coyotes 7–0. Drive: 11 plays, 83 yards, 5:31.

Second quarter

- SDAK – Bohdie Ing 31-yard field goal, 11:24. Coyotes 10–0. Drive: 13 plays, 69 yards, 7:44.
- EWU – Soren McKee 40-yard field goal, 0:45. Coyotes 10–3. Drive: 7 plays, 32 yards, 0:51.
- SDAK – Tennel Bryant 66-yard pass from Austyn Modrzewski (Bohdie Ing kick), 0:26. Coyotes 17–3. Drive: 3 plays, 66 yards, 0:15.

Third quarter

- SDAK – Charles Pierre Jr. 72-yard run (Bohdie Ing kick), 13:15. Coyotes 24–3. Drive: 5 plays, 85 yards, 1:39.
- SDAK – Tennel Bryant 48-yard pass from Austyn Modrzewski (Bohdie Ing kick), 10:32. Coyotes 31–3. Drive: 2 plays, 60 yards, 0:50.
- EWU – Kayden Stuit 11-yard pass from Nate Bell (Soren McKee kick), 1:16. Coyotes 31–10. Drive: 9 plays, 91 yards, 3:13.

Fourth quarter

- SDAK – Charles Pierre Jr. 1-yard run (Bohdie Ing kick), 13:24. Coyotes 38–10. Drive: 5 plays, 4 yards, 2:38.
- EWU – Wesley Garrett 11-yard pass from Nate Bell (Soren McKee kick), 10:27. Coyotes 38–17. Drive: 10 plays, 63 yards, 2:50.
- SDAK – Bohdie Ing 36-yard field goal, 5:11. Coyotes 41–17. Drive: 9 plays, 57 yards, 9:16.
- EWU – Malik Dotson 2-yard run (pass failed), 1:55. Coyotes 41–23. Drive: 10 plays, 68 yards, 3:09.

Statistics	EWU	SDAK
First downs	19	23
Plays–yards	69–342	67–517
Rushes–yards	33–125	42–272
Passing yards	217	245
Passing: comp–att–int	20–36–1	16–25–1
Turnovers	2	1
Time of possession	24:05	35:55

Team	Category	Player	Statistics
Eastern Washington	Passing	Nate Bell	20/36, 217 yards, 2 TD, INT
Eastern Washington	Rushing	Malik Dotson	12 carries, 52 yards, TD
Eastern Washington	Receiving	Wesley Garrett	7 receptions, 109 yards, TD
South Dakota	Passing	Austyn Modrzewski	16/24, 245 yards, 3 TD, INT
South Dakota	Rushing	Charles Pierre Jr.	15 carries, 138 yards, 2 TD
South Dakota	Receiving	Tennel Bryant	3 receptions, 120 yards, 2 TD

=== at Boise State (FBS) ===
No. 10 South Dakota Coyotes (3–0) at Boise State Broncos (FBS) (1–1) – Game summary

Quarter	1	2	3	4	Total
No. 10 Coyotes	7	7	7	3	24
Broncos (FBS)	7	14	3	14	38

at Albertsons Stadium, Boise, ID

- Date: September 19, 2026
- Game time: 9:00 p.m.
- Game weather: Clear • Temperature: 73 °F (23 °C) • Wind: W at 5 miles per hour (8.0 km/h)
- Game attendance: 34,428
- Referee: Preston Clipper
- TV announcers (CBSSN): Chris Lewis, Randy Cross and Brandon Baylor

Game information
First quarter
- SDAK - Bryce Cohoon 16-yard pass from Austyn Modrzewski (Bohdie Ing kick), 8:29. Coyotes 7-0. Drive: 1 play, 16 yards, 0:07.
- BOIS - Rasean Jones 9-yard pass from Maddux Madsen (Canaan Moore kick), 0:04. Tied 7-7. Drive: 9 plays, 65 yards, 3:52.

Second quarter

- SDAK - Tysen Boze 5-yard pass from Austyn Modrzewski (Bohdie Ing kick), 13:39. Coyotes 14-7. Drive: 3 plays, 75 yards, 1:25.
- BOIS - Sire Gaines 3-yard run (Canaan Moore kick), 7:41. Tied 14-14. Drive: 12 plays, 70 yards, 5:49.
- BOIS - Cam Bates 4-yard pass from Maddux Madsen (Canaan Moore kick), 2:04. Broncos 21-14. Drive: 9 plays, 70 yards, 4:53.

Third quarter

- BOIS - Canaan Moore 38-yard field goal, 8:33. Broncos 24-14. Drive: 11 plays, 54 yards, 6:27.
- SDAK - Tysen Boze 59-yard pass from Austyn Modrzewski (Bohdie Ing kick), 2:49. Broncos 24-21. Drive: 3 plays, 55 yards, 1:17.

Fourth quarter

- SDAK - Bohdie Ing 43-yaard field goal, 10:33. Tied 24-24. Drive: 5 plays, 51 yards, 2:17.
- BOIS - Dylan Riley 2-yard run (Canaan Moore kick), 6:25. Broncos 31-24. Drive: 9 plays, 75 yards, 4:08.
- BOIS - Dylan Riley 83-yard run (Canaan Moore kick), 1:33. Broncos 38-24. Drive: 1 play, 83 yards, 0:11.

Statistics	SDAK	BOIS
First downs	11	29
Plays–yards	50–279	79–533
Rushes–yards	22–36	48–325
Passing yards	243	208
Passing: comp–att–int	12–28–2	22–31–0
Turnovers	2	2
Time of possession	20:34	39:26

Team	Category	Player	Statistics
South Dakota	Passing	Austyn Modrzeski	12/27, 243 yards, 3 TD, 2 INT
South Dakota	Rushing	Charles Pierre Jr.	14 carries, 47 yards
South Dakota	Receiving	Tennel Bryant	3 receptions, 104 yards
Boise State	Passing	Maddux Madsen	22/31, 208 yards, 2 TD
Boise State	Rushing	Dylan Riley	26 carries, 198 yards, 2 TD
Boise State	Receiving	Rasean Jones	8 receptions, 95 yards, TD

=== at No. 11 Youngstown State ===
No. 8 South Dakota Coyotes (3–1) at No. 11 Youngstown State Penguins (2–2) – Game summary

Quarter	1	2	3	4	Total
No. 8 Coyotes	7	7	7	7	28
No. 11 Penguins	7	16	3	21	47

at Stambaugh Stadium, Youngstown, OH

- Date: September 26, 2026
- Game time: 1:00 p.m.
- Game weather: Sunny • Temperature: 69 °F (21 °C) • Wind: N at 10 miles per hour (16 km/h)
- Game attendance: 8,849
- Referee: Gregory Gompf
- TV announcers (ESPN+): Drae Smith (play-by-play) and Chris Sammarone (analyst)

Game information
First quarter
- (12:08) YSU – Lynn Wyche-El 10-yard run, Andrew Lastovka kick (Drive: 7 plays, 75 yards, 2:52; Youngstown State 7–0)
- (7:20) SDAK – Jackson Proctor 7-yard run, Bohdie Ing kick (Drive: 9 plays, 64 yards, 4:43; Tied 7–7)

Second quarter

- (13:19) YSU – Beau Brungard 2-yard run, Andrew Lastovka kick (Drive: 9 plays, 52 yards, 3:34; Youngstown State 14–7)
- (7:43) YSU – Lynn Wyche-El 41-yard run, Andrew Lastovka kick failed (Drive: 7 plays, 85 yards, 3:38; Youngstown State 20–7)
- (2:17) SDAK – Tysen Boze 9-yard pass from Austyn Modrzewski, Bohdie Ing kick (Drive: 11 plays, 75 yards, 5:26; Youngstown State 20–14)
- (0:02) YSU – Andrew Lastovka 23-yard field goal (Drive: 11 plays, 72 yards, 2:11; Youngstown State 23–14)

Third quarter

- (8:43) SDAK – Jackson Proctor 22-yard run, Bohdie Ing kick (Drive: 10 plays, 71 yards, 6:13; Youngstown State 23–21)
- (2:04) YSU – Andrew Lastovka 21-yard field goal (Drive: 5 plays, 22 yards, 2:51; Youngstown State 26–21)

Fourth quarter

- (11:54) YSU – Alex McDonald 4-yard pass from Beau Brungard, Andrew Lastovka kick (Drive: 8 plays, 94 yards, 3:06; Youngstown State 33–21)
- (5:55) YSU – Beau Brungard 9-yard run, Andrew Lastovka kick (Drive: 6 plays, 41 yards, 3:10; Youngstown State 40–21)
- (4:06) YSU – Beau Brungard 7-yard run, Andrew Lastovka kick (Drive: 3 plays, 5 yards, 0:59; Youngstown State 47–21)
- (0:32) SDAK – Carson Fletcher 1-yard run, Bohdie Ing kick (Drive: 10 plays, 75 yards, 3:34; Youngstown State 47–28)

Statistics	SDAK	YSU
First downs	17	26
Plays–yards	60–332	65–502
Rushes–yards	185–38	343–48
Passing yards	147	159
Passing: comp–att–int	16–22–2	13–17–0
Turnovers	3	0
Time of possession	31:37	28:23

Team	Category	Player	Statistics
South Dakota	Passing	Austyn Modrzewski	16/22, 147 yards, TD, 2 INT
South Dakota	Rushing	Carson Fletcher	8 carries, 59 yards, TD
South Dakota	Receiving	Brayden White	5 receptions, 37 yards
Youngstown State	Passing	Beau Brungard	13/17, 159 yards, TD
Youngstown State	Rushing	Beau Brungard	28 carries, 170 yards, 3 TD
Youngstown State	Receiving	Jaden Gilbert	3 receptions, 41 yards

=== Indiana State ===
Indiana State Sycamores (2–3) at No. 13 South Dakota Coyotes (3–2) – Game summary

Quarter	1	2	3	4	Total
Sycamores	0	0	7	7	14
No. 13 Coyotes	14	16	7	7	44

at DakotaDome, Vermillion, SD

- Date: October 3, 2026
- Game time: 2:00 p.m.
- Game weather: Indoors; 70 °F (21 °C)
- Game attendance: 9,002
- Referee: Jason Berg
- TV announcers (ESPN+): Jay Elsen (play-by-play) and Andre Fields (analyst)

Game information
First quarter
- (9:38) SDAK – Jesse Miller 4-yard pass from Austyn Modrzewski, Bohdie Ing kick (Drive: 9 plays, 68 yards, 3:51; South Dakota 7–0)
- (1:01) SDAK – Charles Pierre Jr. 10-yard run, Bohdie Ing kick (Drive: 3 plays, 30 yards, 1:31; South Dakota 14–0)

Second quarter

- (12:41) SDAK – Brayden White 37-yard pass from Austyn Modrzewski, Bohdie Ing kick blocked (Drive: 3 plays, 49 yards, 1:26; South Dakota 20–0)
- (4:21) SDAK – Charles Pierre Jr. 17-yard pass from Austyn Madrzewski, Bohdie Ing kick (Drive: 4 plays, 34 yards, 2:12; South Dakota 27–0)
- (0:00) SDAK – Ford Hamilton 49-yard field goal (Drive: 13 plays, 60 yards, 1:44; South Dakota 30–0)

Third quarter

- (7:41) INST – Torey French 63-yard pass from Brady Allen, Sebastian Lopez kick (Drive: 2 plays, 64 yards, 0:41; South Dakota 30–7)
- (2:42) SDAK – Charles Pierre Jr. 24-yard run, Bohdie Ing kick (Drive: 4 plays, 35 yards, 2:29; South Dakota 37–7)

Fourth quarter

- (10:07) SDAK – Tysen Boze 25-yard pass from Jackson Proctor, Bohdie Ing kick (Drive: 9 plays, 80 yards, 5:28; South Dakota 44–7)
- (7:00) INST – Max McCool 1-yard run, Sebastian Lopez kick (Drive: 8 plays, 75 yards, 3:07; South Dakota 44–14)

Statistics	INST	SDAK
First downs	13	23
Plays–yards	58–346	70–437
Rushes–yards	30–113	44–204
Passing yards	233	233
Passing: comp–att–int	15–28–3	18–26–0
Turnovers	5	0
Time of possession	25:13	34:47

Team	Category	Player	Statistics
Indiana State	Passing	Brady Allen	233 yards, TD, 3 INT
Indiana State	Rushing	Max McCool	10 carries, 41 yards, TD
Indiana State	Receiving	Torey French	1 reception, 63 yards, TD
South Dakota	Passing	Austyn Modrzewski	16/23, 196 yards, 3 TD
South Dakota	Rushing	Charles Pierre Jr.	15 carries, 109 yards, 2 TD
South Dakota	Receiving	Brayden White	5 receptions, 90 yards, TD

=== No. 25 Southern Illinois ===
No. 25 Southern Illinois Salukis (3–3) at No. 10 South Dakota Coyotes (4–2) – Game summary

Quarter	1	2	3	4	Total
No. 25 Salukis	0	7	3	0	10
No. 10 Coyotes	7	7	3	14	31

at DakotaDome, Vermillion, SD

- Date: October 10, 2026
- Game time: 1:00 p.m.
- Game weather: Indoors • Temperature: 70 °F (21 °C)
- Game attendance: 7,012
- Referee: Jason Perkins
- TV announcers (ESPN+): Jay Elsen (play-by-play) and Andre Fields (analyst)

Game information
First quarter
- (5:09) SDAK – Jackson Proctor 13-yard run, Ford Hamilton kick (Drive: 5 plays, 85 yards, 2:52; South Dakota 7–0)

Second quarter

- (8:36) SDAK – Tennel Bryant 56-yard pass from Austyn Modrzewski, Bohdie ing kick (Drive: 1 play, 56 yards, 0:09; South Dakota 14–0)
- (1:50) SIU – Kyle Thomas 7-yard pass from DJ Williams, Weston Schofield kick (Drive: 15 plays, 84 yards, 6:43; South Dakota 14–7)

Third quarter

- (8:36) SDAK – Bohdie Ing 31-yard field goal (Drive: 11 plays, 61 plays, 6:24; South Dakota 17–7)
- (3:36) SIU – Weston Schofield 26-yard field goal (Drive: 12 plays, 67 yards, 5:00; South Dakota 17–10)

Fourth quarter

- (14:09) SDAK – Tennel Bryant 44-yard run, Bohdie Ing kick (Drive: 7 plays, 75 yards, 4:27; South Dakota 24–10)
- (8:31) SDAK – Charles Pierre Jr. 12-yard run, Bohdie Ing kick (Drive: 6 plays, 58 yards, 2:52; South Dakota 31–10)

Statistics	SIU	SDAK
First downs	19	23
Plays–yards	65–277	55–486
Rushes–yards	36–98	34–218
Passing yards	179	268
Passing: comp–att–int	18–29–0	17–21–0
Turnovers	0	1
Time of possession	30:51	29:09

Team	Category	Player	Statistics
Southern Illinois	Passing	DJ Williams	18/29, 179 yards, TD
Southern Illinois	Rushing	Chandler Chapman	20 carries, 91 yards
Southern Illinois	Receiving	Allen Middleton	6 receptions, 64 yards
South Dakota	Passing	Austyn Modrzewski	16/20, 268 yards, TD
South Dakota	Rushing	Charles Pierre Jr.	15 carries, 138 yards, TD
South Dakota	Receiving	Brayden White	4 receptions, 84 yards

=== at Murray State ===
No. 9 South Dakota Coyotes (5–2) at Murray State Racers (1–5) – Game summary

Quarter	1	2	3	4	Total
No. 9 Coyotes	0	14	13	21	48
Racers	7	7	0	6	20

at Roy Stewart Stadium, Murray, KY

- Date: October 17, 2026
- Game time: 4:00 p.m.
- Game weather: Sunny • Temperature: 59 °F (15 °C)
- Game attendance: 14,100
- Referee: Dave Hergert
- TV announcers (ESPN+): Rob Cross (play-by-play) and Bryan Cross (analyst)

Game information
First quarter
- (7:36) MUR – Dimitri Howard 11-yard pass from Baxter Wright, Tyler Dorn kick (Drive: 8 plays, 80 plays, 3:56; Murray State 7–0)

Second quarter

- (12:48) SDAK – Brayden White 4-yard pass from Austyn Modrzewski, Bohdie Ing kick (Drive: 17 plays, 79 yards, 9:40; Tied 7–7)
- (2:14) SDAK – Chris Herrin 5-yard pass from Austyn Modrzewski, Bohdie Ing kick (Drive: 11 plays, 58 yards, 5:10; South Dakota 14–7)
- (0:36) MUR – Malachi Williams 4-yard pass from Baxter Wright, Tyler Dorn kick (Drive: 8 plays, 75 yards, 1:38; Tied 14–14)

Third quarter

- (13:04) SDAK – Tennel Bryant 5-yard run, Bohdie Ing kick (Drive: 2 plays, 4 yards, 0:25; South Dakota 21–14)
- (0:59) SDAK – Austyn Modrzewski 1-yard run, Bohdie Ing kick blocked (Drive: 7 plays, 19 yards, 2:32; South Dakota 27–14)

Fourth quarter

- (10:15) SDAK – Brayden White 9-yard pass from Austyn Modrzewski, Bohdie Ing kick (Drive: 6 plays, 78 yards, 3:10; South Dakota 34–14)
- (9:12) SDAK – Reid Watkins 2-yard run, Bohdie Ing kick (Drive: 2 plays, 16 yards, 0:49; South Dakota 41–14)
- (5:33) MUR – Trey Firestone 20-yard pass from Collin Shannon, Baxter Wright pass failed (Drive: 10 plays, 71 yards, 3:39; South Dakota 41–20)
- (1:12) SDAK – Courtney Rivers 6-yard run, Bohdie Ing kick (Drive: 7 plays, 15 yards, 4:17; South Dakota 48–20)

Statistics	SDAK	MUR
First downs	25	18
Plays–yards	72–327	63–351
Rushes–yards	45–174	28–145
Passing yards	153	206
Passing: comp–att–int	17–27–1	20–35–0
Turnovers	1	2
Time of possession	37:45	22:15

Team	Category	Player	Statistics
South Dakota	Passing	Austyn Modrzewski	17/27, 153 yards, 3 TD, INT
South Dakota	Rushing	Carson Fletcher	12 carries, 56 yards
South Dakota	Receiving	Brayden White	7 receptions, 78 yards, 2 TD
Murray State	Passing	Collin Shannon	10/17, 150 yards, TD
Murray State	Rushing	Baxter Wright	8 carries, 59 yards
Murray State	Receiving	Jaxon Potter	6 receptions, 69 yards

=== No. 6 North Dakota (Sitting Bull Trophy) ===
No. 6 North Dakota Fighting Hawks (6–2) at No. 8 South Dakota Coyotes (6–2) – Game summary

Quarter	1	2	3	4	OT	Total
No. 6 Fighting Hawks	0	3	7	10	3	23
No. 8 Coyotes	17	3	0	0	6	26

at DakotaDome, Vermillion, SD

- Date: October 24, 2026
- Game time: 1:00 p.m.
- Game weather: Indoors; 71 °F (22 °C)
- Game attendance: 8,241
- Referee: John Shay
- TV announcers (ESPN+): Jay Elsen (play-by-play) and Andre Fields (analyst)

Game information
First quarter
- (10:48) SDAK – Bohdie Ing 47-yard field goal (Drive: 9 plays, 46 yards, 4:12; South Dakota 3–0)
- (4:34) SDAK – Jackson Proctor 4-yard run, Bohdie Ing kick (Drive: 8 plays, 87 yards, 4:24; South Dakota 10–0)
- (1:32) SDAK – Tysen Boze 4-yard pass from Austyn Modrzewski, Bohdie Ing kick (Drive: 4 plays, 20 yards, 1:37; South Dakota 17–0)

Second quarter

- (12:26) UND – Kenten Laughman 46-yard field goal (Drive: 9 plays, 46 yards, 4:06; South Dakota 17–3)
- (1:44) SDAK – Bohdie Ing 46-yard field goal (Drive: 10 plays, 62 yards, 5:40; South Dakota 20–3)

Third quarter

- (7:32) UND – Javance Tupou'ata-Johnson 1-yard run, Kenten Laughman kick (Drive: 15 plays, 78 yards, 7:24; South Dakota 20–10)

Fourth quarter

- (3:57) UND – Matt Lawson 1-yard run, Kenten Laughman kick (Drive: 10 plays, 87 yards, 3:45; South Dakota 20–17)
- (0:45) UND – Kenten Laughman 45-yard field goal (Drive: 9 plays, 57 yards, 0:57; Tied 20–20)

Overtime

- UND – Kenten Laughman 38-yard field goal (Drive: 5 plays, 4 yards; North Dakota 23–20)
- SDAK – Brayden White 14-yard pass from Austyn Modrzewski (Drive: 2 plays, 25 yards; South Dakota 26–23)

Statistics	UND	SDAK
First downs	20	18
Plays–yards	74–363	67–324
Rushes–yards	28–112	44–164
Passing yards	251	160
Passing: comp–att–int	25–46–0	16–23–0
Turnovers	2	0
Time of possession	27:21	32:39

Team	Category	Player	Statistics
North Dakota	Passing	Jerry Kaminski	25/46, 251 yards
North Dakota	Rushing	Matt Lawson	10 carries, 46 yards, TD
North Dakota	Receiving	Deng Deng	8 receptions, 88 yards
South Dakota	Passing	Austyn Modrzewski	15/22, 159 yards, 2 TD
South Dakota	Rushing	Charles Pierre Jr.	21 carries, 128 yards
South Dakota	Receiving	Brayden White	6 receptions, 101 yards, TD

=== at No. 5 South Dakota State (rivalry) ===
No. 6 South Dakota Coyotes (7–2) at No. 5 South Dakota State Jackrabbits (6–2) – Game summary

Quarter	1	2	Total
No. 6 Coyotes			0
No. 5 Jackrabbits			0

at Dana J. Dykhouse Stadium, Brookings, SD

- Date: October 31, 2026
- Game time: 3:00 p.m.
- Game weather: TBD
- TV: ESPNU

Game information
First quarter

Second quarter Third quarter Fourth quarter

Statistics	SDAK	SDST
First downs		
Plays–yards		
Rushes–yards		
Passing yards		
Passing: comp–att–int		
Turnovers		
Time of possession		

Team	Category	Player	Statistics
South Dakota	Passing		
South Dakota	Rushing		
South Dakota	Receiving		
South Dakota State	Passing		
South Dakota State	Rushing		
South Dakota State	Receiving		

=== Northern Iowa ===
Northern Iowa Panthers (4–5) at No. 10 South Dakota Coyotes (7–3) – Game summary

Quarter	1	2	Total
Panthers			0
No. 10 Coyotes			0

at DakotaDome, Vermillion, SD

- Date: November 14, 2026
- Game time: 1:00 p.m.
- Game weather: Indoors; 70 °F (21 °C)
- TV: ESPN+

Game information
First quarter

Second quarter Third quarter Fourth quarter

Statistics	UNI	SDAK
First downs		
Plays–yards		
Rushes–yards		
Passing yards		
Passing: comp–att–int		
Turnovers		
Time of possession		

Team	Category	Player	Statistics
Northern Iowa	Passing		
Northern Iowa	Rushing		
Northern Iowa	Receiving		
South Dakota	Passing		
South Dakota	Rushing		
South Dakota	Receiving		

=== at No. 11 Illinois State ===
No. 7 South Dakota Coyotes (8–3) at No. 6 Illinois State Redbirds (8–3) – Game summary

Quarter	1	2	Total
No. 7 Coyotes			0
No. 11 Redbirds			0

at Hancock Stadium, Normal, IL

- Date: November 21, 2026
- Game time: 12:00 p.m.
- Game weather: TBD
- TV: ESPN+

Game information
First quarter

Second quarter Third quarter Fourth quarter

Statistics	SDAK	ILST
First downs		
Plays–yards		
Rushes–yards		
Passing yards		
Passing: comp–att–int		
Turnovers		
Time of possession		

Team	Category	Player	Statistics
South Dakota	Passing		
South Dakota	Rushing		
South Dakota	Receiving		
Illinois State	Passing		
Illinois State	Rushing		
Illinois State	Receiving		
