= 2025 South Dakota Coyotes football team =

American college football season

2025 South Dakota Coyotes football

NCAA Division I Quarterfinal, L 22–52 at Montana
- Conference: Missouri Valley Football Conference

Ranking
- STATS: No. 9
- FCS Coaches: No. 11
- Record: 10–5 (6–2 MVFC)
- Head coach: Travis Johansen (1st season)
- Offensive coordinator: Tim Morrison (1st season)
- Co-offensive coordinator: Matt Vitzthum (1st season)
- Offensive scheme: Pistol
- Defensive coordinator: Billy Kirch (1st season)
- Base defense: Multiple
- Home stadium: DakotaDome

2025 Missouri Valley Football Conference standings
	Conf.			Overall
Team	W		L	W		L
No. 4т North Dakota State $^	8	–	0	12	–	1
No. 9 South Dakota ^	6	–	2	10	–	5
No. 2 Illinois State ^	5	–	3	12	–	5
No. 14 North Dakota ^	5	–	3	8	–	6
No. 18 Youngstown State ^	5	–	3	8	–	5
No. 13 South Dakota State ^	4	–	4	9	–	5
No. 25 Southern Illinois	4	–	4	7	–	5
Northern Iowa	1	–	7	3	–	9
Murray State	1	–	7	1	–	11
Indiana State	1	–	7	3	–	9
$ – Conference champion; ^ – FCS playoff participant; Rankings from STATS Poll

The 2025 South Dakota Coyotes football team represented the University of South Dakota as a member of the Missouri Valley Football Conference (MVFC) during the 2025 NCAA Division I FCS football season. The Coyotes were led by first-year head coach Travis Johansen, who replaces former coach Bob Nielson who retired after the 2024 season. Johansen was promoted from being the Coyotes defensive coordinator last season, and was assisted by first year offensive coordinator Tim Morrison, first year co-offensive coordinator Matt Vitzthum, and first year defensive coordinator Billy Kirch. Morrison was also promoted within the program, as he was the Coyotes tight ends coach in 2024. Kirch joined the program after coaching at NAIA Northwestern University in Iowa for ten seasons.

== Preseason ==
=== MVFC poll ===
The Missouri Valley Football Conference released its preseason poll on July 21, 2025, voted on by league athletic directors, coaches, and media members. The Coyotes were predicted to finish third in the conference.

== Schedule ==
Date	Time	Opponent	Rank	Site	TV	Result	Attendance
August 30	2:30 p.m.	at No. 22 (FBS) Iowa State*	No. 4	Jack Trice Stadium; Ames, IA	FOX	L 7–55	61,500
September 6	6:00 p.m.	at Lamar*	No. 4	Provost Umphrey Stadium; Beaumont, TX	ESPN+	L 13–20	6,043
September 13	1:00 p.m.	Northern Colorado*	No. 12	DakotaDome; Vermillion, SD	Midco Sports/ESPN+	W 24–17 ^{OT}	6,445
September 20	1:00 p.m.	Drake*	No. 15	DakotaDome; Vermillion, SD	Midco Sports/ESPN+	W 42–21	7,441
September 27	1:00 p.m.	at No. 1 North Dakota State	No. 17	Fargodome; Fargo, ND	Midco Sports/ESPN+	L 13–51	18,498
October 4	2:00 p.m.	Murray State^{†}	No. 21	DakotaDome; Vermillion, SD	Midco Sports/ESPN+	W 49–24	7,953
October 11	12:00 p.m.	at Indiana State	No. 23	Memorial Stadium; Terre Haute, IN	ESPN+	W 19–14	5,373
October 18	1:00 p.m.	at Northern Iowa	No. 22	UNI-Dome; Cedar Falls, IA	ESPN+	W 17–14	8,434
October 25	1:00 p.m.	No. 18 Illinois State	No. 21	DakotaDome; Vermillion, SD	Midco Sports/ESPN+	L 13–21	6,333
November 1	1:00 p.m.	No. 8 North Dakota		DakotaDome; Vermillion, SD (Sitting Bull Trophy)	Midco Sports/ESPN+	W 26–21	6,809
November 8	3:00 p.m.	No. 8 South Dakota State	No. 22	DakotaDome; Vermillion, SD (rivalry)	ESPNU	W 24–17	9,159
November 15	12:00 p.m.	at No. 21 Southern Illinois	No. 17	Saluki Stadium; Carbondale, IL	ESPN+	W 53–51 ^{5OT}	5,622
November 29	12:00 p.m.	Drake*	No. 12	DakotaDome; Vermillion, SD (NCAA Division I First Round)	ESPN+	W 38–17	3,964
December 6	11:00 p.m.	at No. 7 Mercer*	No. 12	Five Star Stadium; Macon, GA (NCAA Division I Second Round)	ESPN+	W 47–0	3,042
December 13	2:30 p.m.	at No. 3 Montana*	No. 12	Washington–Grizzly Stadium; Missoula, MT (NCAA Division I Quarterfinals)	ABC	L 22–52	22,725
*Non-conference game; ^{†}Homecoming; Rankings from STATS Poll released prior to the game; All times are in Central time

== Game summaries ==
All times are Central Time.

=== Regular season ===
==== at No. 22 (FBS) Iowa State ====
No. 4 South Dakota Coyotes (0–0) at No. 22 (FBS) Iowa State Cyclones (1–0) – Game summary

Quarter	1	2	3	4	Total
No. 4 Coyotes	7	0	0	0	7
No. 22 (FBS) Cyclones	14	13	14	14	55

at Jack Trice Stadium, Ames, Iowa

- Date: August 30
- Game time: 2:30 p.m.
- Game weather: Sunny • Temperature: 78 °F (26 °C) • Wind: E at 8 miles per hour (13 km/h)
- Game attendance: 61,500
- Referee: Henry Johns
- TV announcers (FOX): Tim Brando (play-by-play), Devin Gardner (analyst), and Josh Sims (sideline)
- Box score, Recap

Game information
First quarter
- (13:10) ISU – Benjamin Brahmer 4-yard pass from Rocco Becht, Kyle Konrardy kick (Drive: 4 plays, 75 yards, 1:50; ISU 7–0)
- (5:44) SDAK – Larenzo Fenner 6-yard pass from Aidan Bouman, Will Leyland kick (Drive: 12 plays, 75 yards, 7:26; Tied 7–7)
- (1:12) ISU – Abu Sama III 15-yard run, Kyle Konrardy kick (Drive: 9 plays, 75 yards, 4:32; ISU 14–7)

Second quarter

- (9:27) ISU – Benjamin Brahmer 3-yard pass from Rocco Becht, Kyle Konrardy kick (Drive: 7 plays, 76 yards, 3:55; ISU 21–7)
- (2:35) ISU – Kyle Konrardy 28-yard field goal (Drive: 11 plays, 52 yards, 5:16; ISU 24–7)
- (0:00) ISU – Kyle Konrardy 63-yard field goal (Drive: 4 plays, 24 yards, 0:27; ISU 27–7)

Third quarter

- (9:39) ISU – Gabe Burkle 16-yard pass from Rocco Becht, Kyle Konrardy kick (Drive: 4 plays, 33 yards, 2:00; ISU 34–7)
- (8:17) ISU – Xavier Townsend 11-yard run, Chase Smith kick (Drive: 2 plays, 24 yards, 0:47; ISU 41–7)

Fourth quarter

- (10:57) ISU – Alex Manske 4-yard run, Chase Smith kick (Drive: 15 plays, 64 yards, 8:45; ISU 48–7)
- (4:22) ISU – Dylan Lee 8-yard run, Chase Smith kick (Drive: 8 plays, 85 yards, 4:54; ISU 55–7)

Statistics	SDAK	ISU
First downs	11	28
Plays–yards	50–208	67–529
Rushes–yards	21–82	42–223
Passing yards	126	306
Passing: comp–att–int	15–29–2	23–25–0
Turnovers	2	0
Time of possession	24:42	35:18

Team	Category	Player	Statistics
South Dakota	Passing	Aidan Bouman	15/29, 126 yards, TD, 2 INT
South Dakota	Rushing	Charles Pierre Jr.	13 carries, 49 yards
South Dakota	Receiving	Charles Pierre Jr.	4 receptions, 37 yards
Iowa State	Passing	Rocco Becht	19/20, 278 yards, 3 TD
Iowa State	Rushing	Dylan Lee	13 carries, 81 yards, TD
Iowa State	Receiving	Gabe Burkle	4 receptions, 85 yards, TD

==== at Lamar ====
No. 4 South Dakota Coyotes (0–1) at Lamar Cardinals (0–1) – Game summary

Quarter	1	2	3	4	Total
No. 4 Coyotes	10	0	3	0	13
Cardinals	3	7	3	7	20

at Provost Umphrey Stadium, Beaumont, TX

- Date: September 6
- Game time: 6:00 p.m.
- Game weather: Cloudy • Temperature: 85 °F (29 °C) • Wind: NE at 6 miles per hour (9.7 km/h)
- Game attendance: 6,043
- Referee: Craig Helser
- TV announcers (ESPN+): Dan Gresham (play-by-play) and LeMont Williams (analyst)
- Box score, Recap

Game information
First quarter
- (11:15) SDAK – Jack Martens 11-yard pass from Aidan Bouman, Will Leyland kick (Drive: 7 plays, 75 yards, 3:45; SDAK 7–0)
- (8:45) SDAK – Will Leyland 32-yard field goal (Drive: 4 plays, 5 yards, 1:35; SDAK 10–0)
- (0:25) LAM – Ben Woodard 30-yard field goal (Drive: 15 plays, 69 yards, 8:13; SDAK 10–3)

Second quarter

- (12:36) LAM – Robert Coleman 1-yard run, Ben Woodard kick (Drive: 5 plays, 25 yards, 2:44; Tied 10–10)

Third quarter

- (5:56) LAM – Ben Woodard 26-yard field goal (Drive: 11 plays, 57 yards, 4:57; LAM 13–10)
- (0:34) SDAK – Will Leyland 44-yard field goal (Drive: 10 plays, 45 yards, 5:16; Tied 13–13)

Fourth quarter

- (9:51) LAM – John Robinson 5-yard run, Ben Woodard kick (Drive: 11 plays, 69 yards, 5:37; LAM 20–13)

Statistics	SDAK	LAM
First downs	13	16
Total yards	243	204
Rushing yards	135	139
Passing yards	108	65
Passing: Comp–Att–Int	10–21–1	8–16–2
Time of possession	26:29	33:22

Team	Category	Player	Statistics
South Dakota	Passing	Aidan Bouman	10/21, 108 yards, TD, INT
South Dakota	Rushing	L.J. Phillips Jr.	14 carries, 60 yards
South Dakota	Receiving	Larenzo Fenner	3 receptions, 41 yards
Lamar	Passing	Robert Coleman	8/16, 65 yards, 2 INT
Lamar	Rushing	Major Bowden	14 carries, 48 yards
Lamar	Receiving	Jaydn Girard	3 receptions, 25 yards

==== Northern Colorado ====
Northern Colorado Bears (1–1) at No. 12 South Dakota Coyotes (0–2) – Game summary

Quarter	1	2	3	4	OT	Total
Bears	0	6	0	11	0	17
No. 12 Coyotes	3	7	0	7	7	24

at DakotaDome, Vermillion, SD

- Date: September 13
- Game time: 1:00 p.m.
- Game weather: Indoors; 72 °F (22 °C)
- Game attendance: 6,445
- Referee: Carl Chapman
- TV announcers (Midco Sports/ESPN+): Jay Elsen (play-by-play) and Andre Fields (analyst)
- Box score, Recap

Game information

First quarter

- (0:39) SDAK – Will Leyland 23-yard field goal (Drive: 10 plays, 87 yards, 5:08; SDAK 3–0)

Second quarter

- (7:29) UNCO – Jacob Willig 33-yard field goal (Drive: 14 plays, 57 yards, 8:03; Tied 3–3)
- (3:55) UNCO – Jacob Willig 19-yard field goal (Drive: 6 plays, 21 yards, 2:28; UNCO 6–3)
- (1:38) SDAK – L.J. Phillips Jr. 1-yard run, Will Leyland kick (Drive: 7 plays, 80 yards, 2:12; SDAK 10–6)

Third quarter

- No scoring plays.

Fourth quarter

- (9:24) SDAK – Zach Witte 12-yard pass from Aidan Bouman, Will Leyland kick (Drive: 14 plays, 99 yards, 8:08; SDAK 17–6)
- (5:07) UNCO – Charles Garrison 24-yard pass from Eric Gibson, Brayden Munroe pass to Eric Gibson Jr. for two-point conversion (Drive: 8 plays, 77 yards, 4:10; SDAK 17–14)
- (0:03) UNCO – Jacob Willig 18-yard field goal (Drive: 11 plays, 70 yards, 1:57; Tied 17–17)

Overtime

- SDAK – L.J. Phillips Jr. 13-yard run, Will Leyland kick (Drive: 3 plays, 25 yards; SDAK 24–17)

Statistics	UNCO	SDAK
First downs	20	23
Plays–yards	72–427	66–406
Rushes–yards	32–91	47–307
Passing yards	336	99
Passing: Comp–Att–Int	28–40–0	7–19–1
Turnovers	0	1
Time of possession	30:57	29:03

Team	Category	Player	Statistics
Northern Colorado	Passing	Eric Gibson Jr.	28/39, 336 yards, TD
Northern Colorado	Rushing	Brandon Johnson	14 carries, 46 yards
Northern Colorado	Receiving	Charles Garrison	7 receptions, 112 yards, TD
South Dakota	Passing	Aidan Bouman	7/19, 99 yards, TD, INT
South Dakota	Rushing	L.J. Phillips Jr.	35 carries, 301 yards, 2 TD
South Dakota	Receiving	Jack Martens	2 receptions, 32 yards

==== Drake ====
Drake Bulldogs (1–1) vs. No. 15 South Dakota Coyotes (1–2) – Game summary

Quarter	1	2	3	4	Total
Bulldogs	0	7	0	14	21
No. 15 Coyotes	7	21	14	0	42

at DakotaDome, Vermillion, SD

- Date: September 20
- Game time: 1:00 p.m.
- Game weather: Indoors; 72 °F (22 °C)
- Game attendance: 7,441
- Referee: David Hergert
- TV announcers (Midco Sports/ESPN+): Jay Elsen (play-by-play) and Andre Fields (analyst)
- Box score, Recap

Game information
First quarter
- (9:27) SDAK – L.J. Phillips Jr. 2-yard run, Will Leyland kick (Drive: 7 plays, 69 yards, 3:33; SDAK 7–0)

Second quarter

- (14:51) SDAK – L.J. Phillips Jr. 2-yard run, Will Leyland kick (Drive: 10 plays, 90 yards, 5:23; SDAK 14–0)
- (7:07) DRKE – Logan Inagawa 1-yard run, Harry Balke kick (Drive: 8 plays, 59 yards, 4:40; SDAK 14–7)
- (5:28) SDAK – Larenzo Fenner 70-yard pass from Aidan Bouman, Will Leyland kick (Drive: 3 plays, 70 yards, 1:33; SDAK 21–7)
- (0:55) SDAK – Larenzo Fenner 31-yard pass from Aidan Bouman, Will Leyland kick (Drive: 7 plays, 76 yards, 2:55; SDAK 28–7)

Third quarter

- (10:46) SDAK – L.J. Phillips Jr. 2-yard run, Will Leyland kick (Drive: 7 plays, 58 yards, 4:08; SDAK 35–7)
- (8:29) SDAK – L.J. Phillips Jr. 50-yard run, Will Leyland kick (Drive: 1 play, 50 yards, 0:10; SDAK 42–7)

Fourth quarter

- (12:20) DRKE – Logan Inagawa 1-yard run, Harry Balke kick (Drive: 12 plays, 72 yards, 5:44; SDAK 42–14)
- (2:48) DRKE – Chase Schutty 6-yard pass from Logan Inagawa, Harry Balke kick (Drive: 11 plays, 93 yards, 6:10; SDAK 42–21)

Statistics	DRKE	SDAK
First downs	20	21
Total yards	302	508
Rushing yards	138	282
Passing yards	164	226
Passing: Comp–Att–Int	15–20–2	13–20–0
Time of possession	30:39	29:21

Team	Category	Player	Statistics
Drake	Passing	Logan Inagawa	15/19, 164 yards, TD, 2 INT
Drake	Rushing	Logan Inagawa	19 carries, 73 yards, 2 TD
Drake	Receiving	Jackson Voth	6 receptions, 85 yards, TD
South Dakota	Passing	Aidan Bouman	13/20, 226 yards, 2 TD
South Dakota	Rushing	L.J. Phillips Jr.	19 carries, 143 yards, 4 TD
South Dakota	Receiving	Larenzo Fenner	2 receptions, 101 yards, 2 TD

==== at No. 1 North Dakota State ====
No. 17 South Dakota Coyotes (2–2) at No. 1 North Dakota State Bison (3–0) – Game summary

Quarter	1	2	3	4	Total
No. 17 Coyotes	0	3	0	10	13
No. 1 Bison	13	21	10	7	51

at Fargodome, Fargo, ND

- Date: September 27
- Game time: 1:00 p.m.
- Game weather: Indoors; 70 °F (21 °C)
- Game attendance: 18,498
- Referee: Grant Henderson
- TV announcers (ESPN+): Dom Izzo (play-by-play), Kyle Emanuel (analyst) and Sam Goetzinger (sideline)
- Box score, Recap

Game information
First quarter
- (10:49) NDSU – Barika Kpeenu 7-yard run, Eli Ozick kick (Drive: 8 plays, 77 yards, 4:06; NDSU 7–0)
- (2:17) NDSU – Cole Payton 1-yard run (Drive: 12 plays, 90 yards, 6:16; NDSU 13–0)

Second quarter

- (13:44) NDSU – Barika Kpeenu 6-yard run, Eli Ozick kick (Drive: 6 plays, 46 yards, 2:44; NDSU 20–0)
- (5:38) NDSU – Bryce Lance 2-yard pass from Cole Payton, Eli Ozick kick (Drive: 11 plays, 95 yards, 5:49; NDSU 27–0)
- (0:53) NDSU – Reis Kessel 29-yard pass from Cole Payton, Eli Ozick kick (Drive: 9 plays, 83 yards, 1:54; NDSU 34–0)
- (0:00) SDAK – Will Leyland 31-yard field goal (Drive: 6 plays, 62 yards, 0:53; NDSU 34–3)

Third quarter

- (12:43) NDSU – Nathaniel Staehling 43-yard interception, Eli Ozick kick (NDSU 41–3)
- (7:39) NDSU – Eli Ozick 29-yard field goal (Drive: 8 plays, 49 yards, 3:58; NDSU 44–3)

Fourth quarter

- (12:23) NDSU – Jackson Williams 9-yard run, Eli Ozick kick (Drive: 11 plays, 88 yards, 6:32; NDSU 51–3)
- (8:06) SDAK – Zeke Mata 51-yard field goal (Drive: 8 plays, 42 yards, 4:17; NDSU 51–6)
- (1:11) SDAK – Carson Fletcher 4-yard run, Will Leyland kick (Drive: 8 plays, 80 yards, 4:23; NDSU 51–13)

Statistics	SDAK	NDSU
First downs	13	24
Total yards	296	547
Rushing yards	88	274
Passing yards	208	273
Passing: Comp–Att–Int	13–21–1	15–19–0
Time of possession	24:53	35:07

Team	Category	Player	Statistics
South Dakota	Passing	Aidan Bouman	13/21, 208 yards, INT
South Dakota	Rushing	Reid Watkins	8 carries, 39 yards
South Dakota	Receiving	Tennel Bryant	2 receptions, 50 yards
North Dakota State	Passing	Cole Payton	14/18, 273 yards, 2 TD
North Dakota State	Rushing	Cole Payton	11 carries, 102 yards, TD
North Dakota State	Receiving	Bryce Lance	4 receptions, 98 yards, TD

==== Murray State ====
Murray State Racers (0–4) vs. No. 21 South Dakota Coyotes (2–3) – Game summary

Quarter	1	2	3	4	Total
Racers	7	0	10	7	24
No. 21 Coyotes	14	21	14	0	49

at DakotaDome, Vermillion, SD

- Date: October 4
- Game time: 2:00 p.m.
- Game weather: Indoors; 72 °F (22 °C)
- Game attendance: 7,953
- Referee: Tyler Downs
- TV announcers (Midco Sports/ESPN+): Jay Elsen (play-by-play) and Andre Fields (analyst)
- Box score, Recap

Game information
First quarter
- (13:03) SDAK – Larenzo Fenner 41-yard pass from Aidan Bouman, Will Leyland kick (Drive: 4 plays, 57 yards, 1:50; SDAK 7–0)
- (7:12) SDAK – L.J. Phillips Jr. 12-yard run, Will Leyland kick (Drive: 8 plays, 75 yards, 5:01; SDAK 14–0)
- (1:04) MUR – J'Kalon Carter 16-yard pass from Jim Ogle, Jack Tannehill kick (Drive: 10 plays, 80 yards, 3:14; SDAK 14–7)

Second quarter

- (9:51) SDAK – L.J. Phillips Jr. 17-yard run, Will Leyland kick (Drive: 10 plays, 75 yards, 6:13; SDAK 21–7)
- (3:16) SDAK – L.J. Phillips Jr. 13-yard run, Will Leyland kick (Drive: 9 plays, 82 yards, 5:16; SDAK 28–7)
- (0:08) SDAK – Zach Witte 6-yard pass from Aidan Bouman, Will Leyland kick (Drive: 12 plays, 89 yards, 2:25; SDAK 35–7)

Third quarter

- (13:05) SDAK – L.J. Phillips Jr. 67-yard run, Will Leyland kick (Drive: 1 play, 67 yards, 0:11; SDAK 42–7)
- (9:43) MUR – Darius Cannon 29-yard pass from J'Kalon Carter, Jack Tannehill kick (Drive: 8 plays, 78 yards, 3:16; SDAK 42–14)
- (4:23) MUR – Jack Tannehill 25-yard field goal (Drive: 10 plays, 47 yards, 5:17; SDAK 42–17)
- (1:13) SDAK – Jack Martens 28-yard pass from Aidan Bouman, Will Leyland kick (Drive: 5 plays, 67 yards, 3:04; SDAK 49–17)

Fourth quarter

- (3:27) MUR – Tyrell Campbell 1-yard run, Jack Tannehill kick (Drive: 14 plays, 80 yards, 5:15; SDAK 49–24)

Statistics	MUR	SDAK
First downs	19	29
Total yards	312	568
Rushing yards	100	380
Passing yards	212	188
Passing: Comp–Att–Int	17–31–0	12–17–0
Time of possession	26:36	33:24

Team	Category	Player	Statistics
Murray State	Passing	Jim Ogle	16/30, 183 yards, TD
Murray State	Rushing	Jordan Washington	9 carries, 49 yards
Murray State	Receiving	Lucas Desjardins	5 receptions, 54 yards
South Dakota	Passing	Aidan Bouman	11/16, 185 yards, 3 TD
South Dakota	Rushing	L.J. Phillips Jr.	24 carries, 244 yards, 4 TD
South Dakota	Receiving	Larenzo Fenner	3 receptions, 108 yards, TD

==== at Indiana State ====
No. 23 South Dakota Coyotes (3–3) at Indiana State Sycamores (2–3) – Game summary

Quarter	1	2	3	4	Total
No. 23 Coyotes	3	10	3	3	19
Sycamores	0	7	0	7	14

at Memorial Stadium, Terre Haute, IN

- Date: October 11
- Game time: 12:00 p.m.
- Game weather: Sunny
- Game attendance: 5,373
- Referee: John Shay
- TV announcers (ESPN+): Brendan King (play-by-play) and Austin Osborne (analyst)
- Box score, Recap

Game information
First quarter
- (2:08) SDAK – Will Leyland 32-yard field goal (Drive: 15 plays, 58 yards, 9:36; SDAK 3–0)

Second quarter

- (4:25) SDAK – L.J. Phillips Jr. 1-yard run, Will Leyland kick (Drive: 10 plays, 57 yards, 5:00; SDAK 10–0)
- (3:04) INST – Keshon Singleton 57-yard pass from Brock Riddle, Sebastian Lopex kick (Drive: 4 plays, 75 yards, 1:21; SDAK 10–7)
- (0:00) SDAK – Will Leyland 26-yard field goal (Drive: 10 plays, 57 yards, 3:04; SDAK 13–7)

Third quarter

- (6:44) SDAK – Will Leyland 23-yard field goal (Drive: 12 plays, 71 yards, 6:42; SDAK 16–7)

Fourth quarter

- (7:28) SDAK – Will Leyland 42-yard field goal (Drive: 9 plays, 51 yards, 6:11; SDAK 19–7)
- (4:39) INST – Nick Osho 1-yard pass from Brock Riddle, Sebastian Lopez kick (Drive: 10 plays, 75 yards, 2:49; SDAK 19–14)

Statistics	SDAK	INST
First downs	23	8
Total yards	376	210
Rushing yards	190	85
Passing yards	186	125
Passing: Comp–Att–Int	16–25–0	13–23–0
Time of possession	45:21	14:39

Team	Category	Player	Statistics
South Dakota	Passing	Aidan Bouman	16/25, 186 yards
South Dakota	Rushing	L.J. Phillips Jr.	34 carries, 187 yards, TD
South Dakota	Receiving	Jack Martens	5 receptions, 77 yards
Indiana State	Passing	Brock Riddle	13/23, 125 yards, 2 TD
Indiana State	Rushing	Nick Osho	12 carries, 71 yards
Indiana State	Receiving	Keshon Singleton	2 receptions, 78 yards, TD

==== at Northern Iowa ====
No. 22 South Dakota Coyotes (4–3) at Northern Iowa Panthers (2–4) – Game summary

Quarter	1	2	3	4	Total
No. 22 Coyotes	7	3	7	0	17
Panthers	0	7	0	7	14

at UNI-Dome, Cedar Falls, IA

- Date: October 18
- Game time: 1:00 p.m.
- Game weather: Indoors, 70 °F (21 °C)
- Game attendance: 8,434
- Referee: Gregory Gompf
- TV announcers (ESPN+): Brad Wells (play-by-play) and Justin Surrency (analyst)
- Box score, Recap

Game information
First quarter
- (6:24) SDAK – Larenzo Fenner 18-yard pass from Aidan Bouman, Will Leyland kick (Drive: 10 plays, 79 yards, 6:34; SDAK 7–0)

Second quarter

- (1:00) UNI – Briggs Hughston 4-yard pass from Matthew Schecklman, Max Bartachek kick (Drive: 10 plays, 88 yards, 4:32; Tied 7–7)
- (0:00) SDAK – Zeke Mata 58-yard field goal (Drive: 5 plays, 15 yards, 0:51; SDAK 10–7)

Third quarter

- (7:26) SDAK – Larenzo Fenner 67-yard pass from Aidan Bouman, Will Leyland kick (Drive: 5 plays, 92 yards, 2:46; SDAK 17–7)

Fourth quarter

- (0:41) UNI – Bill Jackson 7-yard pass from Matthew Schecklman, Max Bartachek kick (Drive: 9 plays, 56 yards, 0:36; SDAK 17–14)

Statistics	SDAK	UNI
First downs	17	20
Total yards	293	285
Rushing yards	91	96
Passing yards	202	189
Passing: Comp–Att–Int	16–24–0	22–40–0
Time of possession	29:38	30–22

Team	Category	Player	Statistics
South Dakota	Passing	Aidan Bouman	16/24, 202 yards, 2 TD
South Dakota	Rushing	L.J. Phillips Jr.	15 carries, 73 yards
South Dakota	Receiving	Larenzo Fenner	3 receptions, 84 yards, 2 TD
Northern Iowa	Passing	Matthew Schecklman	22/40, 189 yards, 2 TD
Northern Iowa	Rushing	Matthew Schecklman	16 carries, 60 yards
Northern Iowa	Receiving	JC Roque Jr.	7 receptions, 91 yards

==== No. 18 Illinois State ====
No. 18 Illinois State (4–3) vs. No. 21 South Dakota Coyotes (5–3) – Game summary

Quarter	1	2	3	4	Total
No. 18 Redbirds	0	14	7	0	21
No. 21 Coyotes	3	7	0	3	13

at DakotaDome, Vermillion, SD

- Date: October 25
- Game time: 1:00 p.m.
- Game weather: Indoors, 72 °F (22 °C)
- Game attendance: 6,333
- Referee: Jason Perkins
- TV announcers (Midco Sports/ESPN+): Jay Eisen (play-by-play) and Andre Fields (analyst)
- Box score, Recap

Game information
First quarter
- (8:47) SDAK – Will Leyland 37-yard field goal (Drive: 13 plays, 66 yards, 6:02; SDAK 3–0)

Second quarter

- (10:45) ISU – Scotty Presson Jr. 11-yard pass from Tommy Rittenhouse, Matt Maldonado kick (Drive: 12 plays, 79 yards, 4:42; ISU 7–3)
- (2:23) SDAK – Jesse Miller 11-yard pass from Aidan Bouman, Will Leyland kick (Drive: 14 plays, 80 yards, 8:16; SDAK 10–7)
- (0:30) ISU – Tommy Rittenhouse 6-yard run, Matt Maldonado kick (Drive: 12 plays, 75 yards, 1:53; ISU 14–10)

Third quarter

- (1:22) ISU – Scotty Presson Jr. 2-yard pass from Tommy Rittenhouse, Matt Maldonado kick (Drive: 12 plays, 75 yards, 5:15; ISU 21–10)

Fourth quarter

- (3:38) SDAK – Will Leyland 42-yard field goal (Drive: 12 plays, 57 yards, 6:08; ISU 21–13)

Statistics	ISU	SDAK
First downs	18	22
Total yards	300	369
Rushing yards	130	196
Passing yards	170	173
Passing: Comp–Att–Int	19–28–0	21–39–0
Time of possession	23:19	36:41

Team	Category	Player	Statistics
Illinois State	Passing	Tommy Rittenhouse	18/27, 141 yards, 2 TD
Illinois State	Rushing	Seth Glatz	5 carries, 35 yards
Illinois State	Receiving	Dylan Lord	8 receptions, 82 yards
South Dakota	Passing	Aidan Bouman	21/38, 173 yards, TD
South Dakota	Rushing	L.J. Phillips Jr.	26 carries, 129 yards
South Dakota	Receiving	Larenzo Fenner	4 receptions, 65 yards

==== No. 8 North Dakota ====
No. 8 North Dakota (6–2) vs. South Dakota Coyotes (5–4) – Game summary

Quarter	1	2	3	4	Total
No. 8 Fighting Hawks	0	7	7	7	21
Coyotes	2	14	10	0	26

at DakotaDome, Vermillion, SD

- Date: November 1
- Game time: 1:00 p.m.
- Game weather: Indoors, 72 °F (22 °C)
- Game attendance: 6,809
- Referee: Grant Henderson
- TV announcers (Midco Sports/ESPN+): Jay Elsen (play-by-play) and Andre Fields (analyst)
- Box score, Recap

Game information
First quarter
- (3:38) SDAK – Team safety (SDAK 2–0)

Second quarter

- (14:55) SDAK – L.J. Phillips Jr. 1-yard run, Will Leyland kick (Drive: 7 plays, 23 yards, 3:32; SDAK 9–0)
- (11:18) UND – Sawyer Seidl 6-yard run, Kenten Laughman kick (Drive: 8 plays, 75 yards, 3:37; SDAK 9–7)
- (0:45) SDAK – Larenzo Fenner 43-yard pass from Aidan Bouman, Will Leyland kick (Drive: 3 plays, 54 yards, 0:19; SDAK 16–7)

Third quarter

- (9:55) SDAK – Will Leyland 36-yard field goal (Drive: 10 plays, 60 yards, 4:59; SDAK 19–7)
- (7:11) SDAK – Dejuan Lewis 80-yard fumble recovery, Will Leyland kick (Drive: 6 plays, -40 yards, 2:37; SDAK 26–7)
- (2:48) UND – Jerry Kaminski 11-yard run, Kenten Laughman kick (Drive: 11 plays, 75 yards, 4:23; SDAK 26–14)

Fourth quarter

- (12:07) UND – Sawyer Seidl 41-yard run, Kenten Laughman kick (Drive: 4 plays, 59 yards, 1:58; SDAK 26–21)

Statistics	UND	SDAK
First downs	24	17
Total yards	382	270
Rushing yards	205	97
Passing yards	177	173
Passing: Comp–Att–Int	16–30–2	14–20–0
Time of possession	28:50	31:10

Team	Category	Player	Statistics
North Dakota	Passing	Jerry Kaminski	16/30, 177 yards, 2 INT
North Dakota	Rushing	Sawyer Seidl	16 carries, 102 yards, 2 TD
North Dakota	Receiving	B.J. Fleming	5 receptions, 59 yards
South Dakota	Passing	Aidan Bouman	14/20, 173 yards, TD
South Dakota	Rushing	L.J. Phillips Jr.	24 carries, 106 yards, TD
South Dakota	Receiving	Larenzo Fenner	2 receptions, 83 yards, TD

==== No. 8 South Dakota State ====
No. 8 South Dakota State (7–2) vs. No. 22 South Dakota Coyotes (6–4) – Game summary

Quarter	1	2	3	4	Total
No. 8 Jackrabbits	10	7	0	0	17
No. 22 Coyotes	7	10	7	0	24

at DakotaDome, Vermillion, SD

- Date: November 8
- Game time: 3:00 p.m.
- Game weather: Indoors, 72 °F (22 °C)
- Game attendance: 9,159
- Referee: Jason Berg
- TV announcers (ESPNU): Chuckie Kempf (play-by-play) and Darius Walker (analyst)
- Box score, Recap

Game information
First quarter
- (14:49) SDST – Jack Smith 75-yard run, Eli Stader kick (Drive: 1 play, 75 yards, 0:11; SDST 7–0)
- (8:24) SDAK – L.J. Phillips Jr. 10-yard run, Will Leyland kick (Drive: 15 plays, 70 yards, 6:25; Tied 7–7)
- (4:30) SDST – Eli Stader 40-yard field goal (Drive: 8 plays, 53 yards, 3:54; SDST 10–7)

Second quarter

- (4:14) SDAK – Will Leyland 34-yard field goal (Drive: 8 plays, 51 yards, 4:48; Tied 10–10)
- (1:03) SDAK – Larenzo Fenner 19-yard pass from Aidan Bouman, Will Leyland kick (Drive: 3 plays, 80 yards, 0:38; SDAK 17–10)
- (0:05) SDST – Alex Bullock 27-yard pass from Jack Henry, Eli Stader kick (Drive: 7 plays, 70 yards, 0:52; Tied 17–17)

Third quarter

- (11:24) SDAK – L.J. Phillips Jr. 32-yard run, Will Leyland kick (Drive: 7 plays, 75 yards, 3:26; SDAK 24–17)

Fourth quarter

- No scoring plays

Statistics	SDST	SDAK
First downs	16	20
Total yards	330	333
Rushing yards	191	175
Passing yards	139	158
Passing: Comp–Att–Int	13–24–1	14–21–0
Time of possession	27:24	32:36

Team	Category	Player	Statistics
South Dakota State	Passing	Jack Henry	13/24, 139 yards, TD, INT
South Dakota State	Rushing	Jack Smith	3 carries, 82 yards, TD
South Dakota State	Receiving	Jack Smith	6 receptions, 61 yards
South Dakota	Passing	Aidan Bouman	14/21, 158 yards, TD
South Dakota	Rushing	L.J. Phillips Jr.	27 carries, 168 yards, 2 TD
South Dakota	Receiving	Larenzo Fenner	4 receptions, 68 yards, TD

==== at No. 21 Southern Illinois ====
No. 17 South Dakota (7–4) at No. 21 Southern Illinois (6–4) – Game summary

Quarter	1	2	3	4	OT	2OT	3OT	4OT	5OT	Total
No. 17 Coyotes	7	7	7	13	7	8	0	2	2	53
No. 21 Southern Illinois	14	10	7	3	7	8	0	2	0	51

at Saluki Stadium, Carbondale, IL

- Date: November 15
- Game time: 12:00 p.m.
- Game weather: Sunny • Temperature: 75 °F (24 °C)
- Game attendance: 5,622
- Referee: Carl Chapman
- TV announcers (ESPN+): Larry Larson (play-by-play), Pat Poore (analyst) and Taylor Lawrence (sideline)
- Box score, Recap

Game information
First quarter
- (13:56) SIU – Jay Jones 63-yard pass from DJ Williams, Paul Geelen kick (Drive: 3 plays, 75 yards, 1:04; SIU 7–0)
- (9:36) SDAK – Larenzo Fenner 10-yard pass from Aidan Bouman, Will Leyland kick (Drive: 7 plays, 36 yards, 4:13; Tied 7–7)
- (3:15) SIU – Miles Marshall 2-yard pass from DJ Williams, Paul Geelen kick (Drive: 11 plays, 75 yards, 6:21; SIU 14–7)

Second quarter

- (13:19) SDAK – L.J. Phillips 7-yard run, Will Leyland kick (Drive: 10 plays, 72 yards, 4:56; Tied 14–14)
- (10:01) SIU – Lem Wash 3-yard run, Paul Geelen kick (Drive: 7 plays, 66 yards, 3:11; SIU 21–14)
- (0:00) SIU – Paul Geelen 40-yard field goal (Drive: 11 plays, 50 yards, 1:35; SIU 24–14)

Third quarter

- (11:41) SIU – Ryan Schwendeman 4-yard pass from Jace Clark, Paul Geelen kick (Drive: 4 plays, 8 yards, 1:29; SIU 31–14)
- (8:02) SDAK – Zach Witte 22-yard pass from Aidan Bouman, Will Leyland (Drive: 7 plays, 75 yards, 3:39; SIU 31–21)

Fourth quarter

- (11:38) SDAK – Will Leyland 32-yard field goal (Drive: 15 plays, 83 yards, 7:55; SIU 31–24)
- (4:06) SDAK – Larenzo Fenner 11-yard pass from Aidan Bouman, Will Leyland kick (Drive: 8 plays, 73 yards, 4:58; Tied 31–31)
- (1:10) SDAK – Will Leyland 32-yard field goal (Drive: 8 plays, 55 yards, 1:01; SDAK 34–31)
- (0:02) SIU – Paul Geelen 36-yard field goal (Drive: 8 plays, 57 yards, 1:08; Tied 34–34)

First overtime

- SIU – Jay Jones 25-yard pass from DJ Williams, Paul Geelen kick (Drive: 1 play, 25 yards; SIU 41–34)
- SDAK – L.J. Phillips Jr. 16-yard pass from Aidan Bouman, Will Leyland kick (Drive: 4 plays, 25 yards; Tied 41–41)

Second overtime

- SDAK – Larenzo Fenner 24-yard pass from Aidan Bouman, Aidan Bouman pass to Jesse Miller for two-point conversion (Drive: 3 plays, 25 yards; SDAK 49–41)
- SIU – Vinson Davis III 25-yard pass from DJ Williams, DJ Williams pass to Vinson Davis III for two-point conversion (Drive: 1 play, 25 yards; Tied 49–49)

Third overtime

- No scoring plays

Fourth overtime

- SDAK – Tennel Bryant run for two-point conversion (SDAK 51–49)
- SIU – DJ Williams run for two-point conversion (Tied 51–51)

Fifth overtime

- SDAK – Aidan Bouman pass to Larenzo Fenner for two-point conversion (SDAK 53–51)

Statistics	SDAK	SIU
First downs	31	21
Total yards	524	455
Rushing yards	224	148
Passing yards	300	307
Passing: Comp–Att–Int	21–30–1	20–34–1
Time of possession	35:33	24:27

Team	Category	Player	Statistics
South Dakota	Passing	Aidan Bouman	21/30, 300 yards, 5 TD, INT
South Dakota	Rushing	Carson Fletcher	19 carries, 104 yards
South Dakota	Receiving	Larenzo Fenner	6 receptions, 130 yards, 3 TD
Southern Illinois	Passing	DJ Williams	19/31, 303 yards, 4 TD, INT
Southern Illinois	Rushing	DJ Williams	16 carries, 89 yards
Southern Illinois	Receiving	Jay Jones	3 receptions, 108 yards, 2 TD

=== NCAA Division I playoffs ===
==== Drake (First Round) ====
2025 NCAA Division I FCS Playoffs First Round
Drake (8–3) vs. No. 12 South Dakota Coyotes (8–4) – Game summary

Quarter	1	2	3	4	Total
Bulldogs	3	7	0	7	17
No. 12 Coyotes	3	14	14	7	38

at DakotaDome, Vermillion, SD

- Date: November 29
- Game time: 12:00 p.m.
- Game weather: Indoors, 72 °F (22 °C)
- Game attendance: 3,964
- Referee: Cory Hanson
- TV announcers (ESPN+): Jason Ross Jr. (play-by-play) and Tyoka Jackson (analyst)
- Box score, Recap

Game information
First quarter
- (9:12) DRKE – Harry Balke 48-yard field goal (Drive: 11 plays, 44 yards, 5:48; DRKE 3–0)
- (5:04) SDAK – Will Leyland 36-yard field goal (Drive: 8 plays, 41 yards, 4:02; Tied 3–3)

Second quarter

- (10:12) SDAK – Larenzo Fenner 23-yard pass from Aidan Bouman, Will Leyland kick (Drive: 12 plays, 70 yards, 7:19; SDAK 10–3)
- (4:49) DRKE – Logan Inagawa 2-yard run, Harry Balke kick (Drive: 10 plays, 75 yards, 5:23; Tied 10–10)
- (2:26) SDAK – L.J. Phillips Jr. 1-yard run, Will Leyland kick (Drive: 4 plays, 75 yards, 2:23; SDAK 17–10)

Third quarter

- (14:03) SDAK — Larenzo Fenner 27-yard pass from Aidan Bouman, Will Leyland kick (Drive: 2 plays, 29 yards, 0:46; SDAK 24–10)
- (4:29) SDAK — Larenzo Fenner 18-yard pass from Aidan Bouman, Will Leyland kick (Drive: 5 plays, 97 yards, 2:10; SDAK 31–10)

Fourth quarter

- (9:23) SDAK – Jack Martens 3-yard pass from Aidan Bouman, Will Leyland kick (Drive: 7 plays, 73 yards, 4:03; SDAK 38–10)
- (0:09) DRKE – Jackson Voth 6-yard pass from Logan Inagawa, Harry Balke kick (Drive: 11 plays, 65 yards, 3:47; SDAK 38–17)

Statistics	DRKE	SDAK
First downs	26	19
Total yards	330	418
Rushing yards	168	157
Passing yards	162	261
Passing: Comp–Att–Int	20–32–0	15–20–0
Time of possession	35:24	24:36

Team	Category	Player	Statistics
Drake	Passing	Logan Inagawa	19/31, 149 yards, TD
Drake	Rushing	Nick Herman	13 carries, 74 yards
Drake	Receiving	Jackson Voth	10 receptions, 86 yards, TD
South Dakota	Passing	Aidan Bouman	15/20, 261 yards, 4 TD
South Dakota	Rushing	L.J. Phillips Jr.	14 carries, 132 yards, TD
South Dakota	Receiving	Larenzo Fenner	5 receptions, 115 yards, 3 TD

==== at No. 7 Mercer (Second Round) ====
2025 NCAA Division I FCS Playoffs Second Round
No. 12 South Dakota (9–4) at No. 7 Mercer Bears (9–2) – Game summary

Quarter	1	2	3	4	Total
No. 12 Coyotes	14	10	16	7	47
No. 7 Bears	0	0	0	0	0

at Five Star Stadium, Macon, GA

- Date: December 6
- Game time: 11:00 a.m.
- Game weather: Rain • Temperature: 49 °F (9 °C) • Wind: W at 6 miles per hour (9.7 km/h)
- Game attendance: 3,042
- Referee: James Brookhart
- TV announcers (ESPN+): Kelsie Kasper (play-by-play) and Forrest Conoly (analyst)
- Box score, Recap

Game information
First quarter
- (9:13) SDAK – Reid Watkins 8-yard run, Will Leyland kick (Drive: 7 plays, 80 yards, 3:18; SDAK 7–0)
- (3:58) SDAK – L.J. Phillips Jr. 16-yard run, Will Leyland kick (Drive: 7 plays, 47 yards, 4:03; SDAK 14–0)

Second quarter

- (8:18) SDAK – L.J. Phillips Jr. 15-yard run, Will Leyland kick (Drive: 5 plays, 80 yards, 3:20; SDAK 21–0)
- (3:07) SDAK – Will Leyland 40-yard field goal (Drive: 7 plays, 42 yards, 3:13; SDAK 24–0)

Third quarter

- (14:03) SDAK – Larenzo Fenner 66-yard pass from Aidan Bouman, Will Leyland kick (Drive: 3 plays, 68 yards, 0:51; SDAK 31–0)
- (10:41) SDAK – Tysen Boze 63-yard pass from Aidan Bouman, Will Leyland kick (Drive: 1 play, 63 yards, 0:11; SDAK 38–0)
- (1:34) SDAK – Team safety (SDAK 40–0)

Fourth quarter

- (9:27) SDAK – Tennel Bryant 26-yard run, Will Leyland kick (Drive: 6 plays, 42 yards, 3:32; SDAK 47–0)

Statistics	SDAK	MER
First downs	20	20
Total yards	549	277
Rushing yards	308	129
Passing yards	241	148
Passing: Comp–Att–Int	13–18–0	18–39–4
Time of possession	31:28	28:32

Team	Category	Player	Statistics
South Dakota	Passing	Aidan Bouman	13/18, 241 yards, 2 TD
South Dakota	Rushing	L.J. Phillips Jr.	15 carries, 159 yards, 2 TD
South Dakota	Receiving	Tysen Boze	2 receptions, 108 yards, TD
Mercer	Passing	Braden Atkinson	18/39, 148 yards, 4 INT
Mercer	Rushing	CJ Miller	18 carries, 105 yards
Mercer	Receiving	Travion Solomon	4 receptions, 52 yards

==== at No. 3 Montana (Quarterfinal) ====
2025 NCAA Division I FCS Playoffs Quarterfinal
No. 12 (11) South Dakota Coyotes (10–4) at No. 3 (3) Montana Grizzlies (12–1) – Game summary

Quarter	1	2	3	4	Total
No. 12 (11) Coyotes	0	7	0	15	22
No. 3 (3) Grizzlies	10	14	7	21	52

at Washington–Grizzly Stadium, Missoula, MT

- Date: December 13
- Game time: 2:30 p.m.
- Game weather: Sunny • Temperature: 49 °F (9 °C)
- Game attendance: 22,725
- Referee: Alex Parella
- TV: ABC
- Box score, Recap

Game information

First quarter

- (8:55) MONT – Drew Deck 1-yard pass from Keali'i Ah Yat, Jo Silver kick (Drive: 12 plays, 75 yards, 6:00; MONT 7–0)
- (5:37) MONT – Jo Silver 24-yard field goal (Drive: 7 plays, 27 yards, 1:56; MONT 10–0)

Second quarter

- (12:37) MONT – Eli Gillman 1-yard run, Jo Silver kick (Drive: 13 plays, 77 yards, 6:24; MONT 17–0)
- (5:30) MONT – Michael Worthan 53-yard pass from Keali'i Ah Yat, Jo Silver kick (Drive: 5 plays, 83 yards, 2:11; MONT 24–0)
- (0:34) SDAK – L.J. Phillips Jr. 23-yard run, Will Leyland kick (Drive: 9 plays, 75 yards, 4:56; MONT 24–7)

Third quarter

- (11:58) MONT – Drew Deck 93-yard punt return, Jo Silver kick (MONT 31–7)

Fourth quarter

- (14:53) MONT – Michael Wortham 51-yard pass from Keali'i Ah Yat, Jo SIlver kick (Drive: 5 plays, 79 yards, 2:29; MONT 38–7)
- (13:51) SDAK – Jack Martens 69-yard pass from Aidan Bouman, Will Leyland kick (Drive: 4 plays, 75 yards, 1:02; MONT 38–14)
- (8:42) SDAK – Tysen Boze 20-yard pass form Aidan Bouman, Aidan Bouman pass to Tysen Boze for two-point conversion (Drive: 11 plays, 91 yards, 3:41; MONT 38–22)
- (2:40) MONT – Michael Wortham 11-yard run, Jo Silver kick (Drive: 11 plays, 82 yards, 6:01; MONT 45–22)
- (0:31) MONT – Hashim Jones 20-yard run, Jo Silver kick (Drive: 4 plays, 27 yards, 1:44; MONT 52–22)

Statistics	SDAK	MONT
First downs	15	21
Plays–yards	63–353	63–449
Rushes–yards	31–122	33–144
Passing yards	231	305
Passing: Comp–Att–Int	15–32–1	21–30–0
Turnovers	2	0
Time of possession	30:05	29:55

Team	Category	Player	Statistics
South Dakota	Passing	Aidan Bouman	15/32, 231 yards, 2 TD, INT
South Dakota	Rushing	L.J. Phillips Jr.	15 carries, 74 yards, TD
South Dakota	Receiving	Jack Martens	3 receptions, 93 yards, TD
Montana	Passing	Keali'i Ah Yat	18/39, 148 yards, 4 INT
Montana	Rushing	Michael Wortham	3 carries, 43 yards, TD
Montana	Receiving	Michael Wortham	11 receptions, 201 yards, 2 TD

== Ranking movements ==
Ranking movements Legend: ██ Increase in ranking ██ Decrease in ranking RV = Received votes ( ) = First-place votes
	Week														
Poll	Pre	1	2	3	4	5	6	7	8	9	10	11	12	13	Final
STATS FCS	4 (1)	4	12	15	17	21	23	22	21	RV	22	17	16	12	9
Coaches	5	6	20	21	18	RV	RV	RV	RV	RV	25	22	21	20	11
