= 1942 South Dakota Coyotes football team =

American college football season

1942 South Dakota Coyotes football
- Conference: North Central Conference
- Record: 5–3 (4–2 NCC)
- Head coach: Cletus Clinker (1st season)
- Home stadium: Inman Field

1942 North Central Conference football standings
	Conf.					Overall
Team	W		L		T	W		L		T
Iowa State Teachers +	5	–	0	–	0	8	–	1	–	0
Augustana (SD) +	4	–	0	–	0	8	–	0	–	0
South Dakota	4	–	2	–	0	5	–	3	–	0
South Dakota State	3	–	3	–	0	4	–	4	–	0
North Dakota	2	–	3	–	0	3	–	3	–	0
North Dakota Agricultural	2	–	3	–	0	2	–	5	–	1
Morningside	1	–	6	–	0	2	–	6	–	0
Omaha	0	–	4	–	0	1	–	5	–	0
+ – Conference co-champions

The 1942 South Dakota Coyotes football team was an American football team that represented the University of South Dakota in the North Central Conference (NCC) during the 1942 college football season. In its first and only season under head coach Cletus Clinker, the team compiled a 5–3 record (4–2 against NCC opponents), finished in third place out of nine teams in the NCC, and was outscored by a total of 132 to 116.

South Dakota was ranked at No. 164 (out of 590 college and military teams) in the final rankings under the Litkenhous Difference by Score System for 1942.

The team played its home games at Inman Field in Vermillion, South Dakota.

== Schedule ==
Date	Opponent	Site	Result	Attendance	Source
September 26	at Illinois*	Memorial Stadium; Champaign, IL	L 0–46	7,500	
October 3	at Augustana (SD)	Sioux Falls, SD	L 0–19		
October 9	at North Dakota Agricultural	Dacotah Field; Fargo, ND	W 37–12		
October 17	Morningside	Inman Field; Vermillion, SD	W 26–6		
October 24	at South Dakota State	Brookings, SD	W 7–0		
October 31	at Iowa State Teachers	O. R. Latham Stadium; Cedar Falls, IA	L 0–36		
November 7	at Gustavus Adolphus*	St. Peter, MN	W 20–13		
November 13	North Dakota	Inman Field; Vermillion, SD (rivalry)	W 26–0		
*Non-conference game
