= List of South Dakota Coyotes in the NFL draft =

This is a list of South Dakota Coyotes football players in the NFL draft.

== Key ==
B	Back	K	Kicker	NT	Nose tackle
C	Center	LB	Linebacker	FB	Fullback
DB	Defensive back	P	Punter	HB	Halfback
DE	Defensive end	QB	Quarterback	WR	Wide receiver
DT	Defensive tackle	RB	Running back	G	Guard
E	End	T	Offensive tackle	TE	Tight end

== Selections ==
Year	Round	Pick	Overall	Player	Team	Position
1950	21	8	269	Howard Blumhardt	Chicago Cardinals	B
1954	14	3	160	Ordell Braase	Baltimore Colts	T
1957	25	10	299	Carl Johnson	Detroit Lions	B
1958	10	8	117	Ray Schamber	Baltimore Colts	E
1958	14	1	158	Harry Hauffe	Green Bay Packers	T
1958	25	8	297	Wayne Haensel	New York Giants	T
1970	3	11	63	John Kohler	Denver Broncos	T
1972	9	5	213	Gene Macken	St. Louis Cardinals	C
1974	10	24	258	Johnny Vann	Washington Redskins	DB
1979	12	15	318	Bill Moats	Green Bay Packers	P
1980	10	23	272	Ben Long	Miami Dolphins	LB
1982	10	7	258	Craig Austin	Seattle Seahawks	LB
1986	9	11	232	Mike Slaton	Minnesota Vikings	DB
1986	11	23	300	Chul Schwanke	Los Angeles Rams	RB
1990	10	4	252	David Elle	Phoenix Cardinals	TE
2012	6	23	193	Tom Compton	Washington Redskins	T
2014	7	40	255	Tyler Starr	Atlanta Falcons	LB
2024	7	7	227	Myles Harden	Cleveland Browns	DB

== Notable undrafted players ==
Note: No drafts held before 1920

Debut year	Player name	Position	Debut NFL/AFL team	Notes
1986	Rodney Tweet	WR	Atlanta Falcons	—
1999	Matt Chatham	LB	St. Louis Rams	—
2000	Jamel White	RB	Indianapolis Colts	—
2001	Josh Stamer	LB	New York Giants	—
2002	Filip Filipovic	P	Dallas Cowboys	—
2004	Dwight Anderson	DB	St. Louis Rams	—
2004	Jason Anderson	RB	Houston Texans	—
2020	Kameron Cline	DL	Indianapolis Colts	—
2022	Jack Cochrane	LB	Kansas City Chiefs	—
2023	Alex Jensen	OT	Miami Dolphins	—
2024	Brock Mogensen	LB	Dallas Cowboys	—
2025	JJ Galbreath	TE	Pittsburgh Steelers	—
