= 1942 North Dakota Fighting Sioux football team =

American college football season

1942 North Dakota Fighting Sioux football
- Conference: North Central Conference
- Record: 3–3 (2–3 NCC)
- Head coach: Red Jarrett (1st season)
- Home stadium: Memorial Stadium

1942 North Central Conference football standings
	Conf.					Overall
Team	W		L		T	W		L		T
Iowa State Teachers +	5	–	0	–	0	8	–	1	–	0
Augustana (SD) +	4	–	0	–	0	8	–	0	–	0
South Dakota	4	–	2	–	0	5	–	3	–	0
South Dakota State	3	–	3	–	0	4	–	4	–	0
North Dakota	2	–	3	–	0	3	–	3	–	0
North Dakota Agricultural	2	–	3	–	0	2	–	5	–	1
Morningside	1	–	6	–	0	2	–	6	–	0
Omaha	0	–	4	–	0	1	–	5	–	0
+ – Conference co-champions

The 1942 North Dakota Fighting Sioux football team, also known as the Nodaks, was an American football team that represented the University of North Dakota in the North Central Conference (NCC) during the 1942 college football season. In its first year under head coach Red Jarrett, the team compiled a 3–3 record (2–3 against NCC opponents), tied for fifth place out of eight teams in the NCC, and was outscored by a total of 92 to 53.

North Dakota was ranked at No. 300 (out of 590 college and military teams) in the final rankings under the Litkenhous Difference by Score System for 1942.

== Schedule ==
Date	Opponent	Site	Result	Attendance	Source
October 2	Morningside	Memorial Stadium; Grand Forks, ND	W 7–6		
October 17	South Dakota State	Memorial Stadium; Grand Forks, ND	W 19–8		
October 24	at North Dakota Agricultural	Dacotah Field; Fargo, ND (Nickel Trophy)	L 14–26		
October 30	at Augustana (SD)	Sioux Falls, SD	L 0–19		
November 6	at Bemidji State*	Bemidji, MN	W 13–7		
November 13	at South Dakota	Inman Field; Vermillion, SD (rivalry)	L 0–26		
*Non-conference game
