= 1942 North Dakota Agricultural Bison football team =

American college football season

1942 North Dakota Agricultural Bison football
- Conference: North Central Conference
- Record: 2–5–1 (2–3 NCC)
- Head coach: Robert A. Lowe (1st season)
- Home stadium: Dacotah Field

1942 North Central Conference football standings
	Conf.					Overall
Team	W		L		T	W		L		T
Iowa State Teachers +	5	–	0	–	0	8	–	1	–	0
Augustana (SD) +	4	–	0	–	0	8	–	0	–	0
South Dakota	4	–	2	–	0	5	–	3	–	0
South Dakota State	3	–	3	–	0	4	–	4	–	0
North Dakota	2	–	3	–	0	3	–	3	–	0
North Dakota Agricultural	2	–	3	–	0	2	–	5	–	1
Morningside	1	–	6	–	0	2	–	6	–	0
Omaha	0	–	4	–	0	1	–	5	–	0
+ – Conference co-champions

The 1942 North Dakota Agricultural Bison football team was an American football team that represented North Dakota Agricultural College (now known as North Dakota State University) in the North Central Conference (NCC) during the 1942 college football season. In its first season under head coach Robert A. Lowe, the team compiled a 2–5–1 record (2–3 against NCC opponents) and tied for fifth place out of eight teams in the NCC.

North Dakota State was ranked at No. 290 (out of 590 college and military teams) in the final rankings under the Litkenhous Difference by Score System for 1942.

The team played its home games at Dacotah Field in Fargo, North Dakota.

== Schedule ==
Date	Opponent	Site	Result	Attendance	Source
September 21	Concordia–Moorhead*	Dacotah Field; Fargo, ND	L 6–7		
September 28	at Wahpeton NTS*	Wahpeton, ND	T 6–6		
October 2	Iowa State Teachers	Dacotah Field; Fargo, ND	L 19–27		
October 9	South Dakota	Dacotah Field; Fargo, ND	L 12–37		
October 17	at Gustavus Adolphus*	St. Peter, MN	L 0–6	1,200	
October 24	North Dakota^{†}	Dacotah Field; Fargo, ND (Nickel Trophy)	W 26–14		
October 31	at South Dakota State	State Field; Brookings, SD (rivalry)	L 0–14		
November 7	at Morningside	Public Schools Stadium; Sioux City, IA	W 13–7		
*Non-conference game; ^{†}Homecoming
