= 1942 Iowa State Teachers Panthers football team =

American college football season

1942 Iowa State Teachers Panthers football

NCC champion
- Conference: North Central Conference
- Record: 6–1 (5–0 NCC)
- Head coach: Clyde Starbeck (5th season)
- Home stadium: O. R. Latham Stadium

1942 North Central Conference football standings
	Conf.					Overall
Team	W		L		T	W		L		T
Iowa State Teachers +	5	–	0	–	0	8	–	1	–	0
Augustana (SD) +	4	–	0	–	0	8	–	0	–	0
South Dakota	4	–	2	–	0	5	–	3	–	0
South Dakota State	3	–	3	–	0	4	–	4	–	0
North Dakota	2	–	3	–	0	3	–	3	–	0
North Dakota Agricultural	2	–	3	–	0	2	–	5	–	1
Morningside	1	–	6	–	0	2	–	6	–	0
Omaha	0	–	4	–	0	1	–	5	–	0
+ – Conference co-champions

The 1942 Iowa State Teachers Panthers football team represented Iowa State Teachers College in the North Central Conference during the 1942 college football season. In its fifth season under head coach Clyde Starbeck, the team compiled a 6–1 record (5–0 against NCC opponents) and won the conference championship.

Iowa State Teachers was ranked at No. 108 (out of 590 college and military teams) in the final rankings under the Litkenhous Difference by Score System for 1942.

The team played its home games at O. R. Latham Stadium in Cedar Falls, Iowa.

== Schedule ==
Date	Opponent	Site	Result	Source
September 26	South Dakota State	O. R. Latham Stadium; Cedar Falls, IA	W 38–0	
October 2	at North Dakota Agricultural	Dacotah Field; Fargo, ND	W 27–19	
October 17	Western Michigan*	Waldo Stadium; Kalamazoo, MI	L 6–14	
October 24	Morningside	O. R. Latham Stadium; Cedar Falls, IA	W 26–6	
October 31	South Dakota	O. R. Latham Stadium; Cedar Falls, IA	W 36–0	
November 7	Drake*	O. R. Latham Stadium; Cedar Falls, IA	W 27–12	
November 14	at Omaha	Omaha, NE	W 34–13	
*Non-conference game
