= Thurlo McCrady =

American coach (1907–1999)

Biographical details
- Born: July 31, 1907; Coon Rapids, Iowa, U.S.
- Died: May 27, 1999 (aged 91); Lake San Marcos, California, U.S.

Playing career

Football
- c. 1928: Hastings

Coaching career (HC unless noted)

Football
- 1932–1940: Hastings
- 1941–1946: South Dakota State

Basketball
- 1930s: Hastings
- 1941–1947: South Dakota State

Administrative career (AD unless noted)
- ?–1941: Hastings
- 1941–1947: South Dakota State
- 1947–1951: Kansas State
- 1959–1967: AFL (asst. commissioner)
- 1967–1976: ABA (exec. dir.)

Head coaching record
- Overall: 58–40–10 (football)

Accomplishments and honors

Championships
- Football; 6 NCAC (1932–1933, 1935–1937, 1940)

Thurlo E. "Mac" McCrady (July 31, 1907 – May 27, 1999) was an American football, basketball, and track coach, college athletics administrator, and professional sports executive. He served as the head football coach at Hastings College in Hastings, Nebraska from 1932 to 1940 and South Dakota State University in Brookings, South Dakota from 1941 to 1946. McCrady was also the athletic director at South Dakota State fem 1941 to 1947 and Kansas State University from 1947 to 1951. He was the assistant commissioner of the American Football League (AFL) from 1959 to 1967 and executive director of the American Basketball Association (ABA) from 1967 to 1976.

McCrady graduated from Hasting in 1929 and earned a master's degree in physical education at the University of Southern California in 1940. He died on May 27, 1999, at his home in Lake San Marcos, California.

== Head coaching record ==
=== Football ===
| Year | Team | Overall | Conference | Standing | Bowl/playoffs |
|---|---|---|---|---|---|
Hastings Broncos (Nebraska College Athletic Conference) (1932–1940)
| 1932 | Hastings | 5–2–1 | 4–0–1 | T–1st | |
| 1933 | Hastings | 4–2–1 | 3–0–1 | 1st | |
| 1934 | Hastings | 7–2 | 3–1 | 2nd | |
| 1935 | Hastings | 6–4 | 3–1 | 1st | |
| 1936 | Hastings | 8–1 | 4–0 | 1st | |
| 1937 | Hastings | 6–2–1 | 2–0–1 | 1st | |
| 1938 | Hastings | 5–3–2 | 2–1–1 | 3rd | |
| 1939 | Hastings | 6–3–1 | 3–0–1 | 1st (Note: The 1939 Nebraska College Athletic Conference title was declared vacant after the season because Hastings used an ineligible player.) | |
| 1940 | Hastings | 4–4–1 | 3–0–1 | T–1st | |
| Hastings: | | 47–23–7 | 27–3–6 | | |
South Dakota State Jackrabbits (North Central Conference) (1941–1946)
| 1941 | South Dakota State | 2–5 | 1–5 | 7th | |
| 1942 | South Dakota State | 4–4 | 3–3 | 4th | |
| 1943 | No team—World War II | | | | |
| 1944 | South Dakota State | 1–1 | NA | NA | |
| 1945 | South Dakota State | 1–4–1 | NA | NA | |
| 1946 | South Dakota State | 3–3–2 | 2–1–2 | 3rd | |
| South Dakota State: | | 11–17–3 | 6–9–2 | | |
| Total: | | 58–40–10 | | | |
National championship Conference title Conference division title or championship game berth
