= 1944 South Dakota State Jackrabbits football team =

American college football season

1944 South Dakota State Jackrabbits football
- Conference: North Central Conference
- Record: 1–1 (0–0 NCC)
- Head coach: Thurlo McCrady (3rd season)

The 1944 South Dakota State Jackrabbits football team was an American football team that represented South Dakota State University during the 1944 college football season. In its third season under head coach Thurlo McCrady, the team compiled a 1–1 record and was outscored by a total of 27 to 13.

== Schedule ==
Date	Opponent	Site	Result	Attendance	Source
October 21	SDSC ERC (Army)	State Field; Brookings, SD	W 6–0	2,000	
October 28	at Concordia–Moorhead	Moorhead, MN	L 7–27		
November 3	River Falls State		Cancelled		

== Hobo Day ==
Due to wartime restrictions, the annual "Hobo Day" game matched the school's civilian football team against the school's Army training program squad. The Army team was coached by Capt. John Olson, the college's military post commandant.

At halftime of one of Hobo Day game, the team paid tribute to 12 former South Dakota State athletes who lost their lives in World War II. The 12 athletes honored were:

1. Lt. Leon Anderson, football 1942, killed in action in France
2. Lt. Tom Archer, football 1941, Africa
3. Sgt. Glenn Darr, football and basketball, missing in action in air raid over Europe
4. Ensign Alvin Ekberg, football, air raid on the Marshall Islands
5. Pvt. Bob Gilbert, football 1942, Italy
6. Lt. Harry Henningsen, football 1940, Kelley Field, Texas
7. Lt. Carl Tharop, basketball 1940, southwest Pacific
8. Lt. (sg) Irwin Lee, football 1923, southwest Pacific
9. Lt. Raymond Oehler, football 1943, France
10. Capt. Donald Smith, football 1940, air raid over Europe
11. Maj. Clifford Trapp, football 1938, Indianapolis
12. A/C Thomas Ward, football and basketball 1942, Corpus Christi

== Early end to season ==
On November 1, the final game of the season against River Falls Teachers was cancelled. The River Falls squad cancelled due to the loss of players to the selective service and injuries. Following the cancellation, the Jackrabbits disbanded the football squad.
