= 1945 South Dakota State Jackrabbits football team =

American college football season

1945 South Dakota State Jackrabbits football
- Conference: North Central Conference
- Record: 1–4–1 ( NCC)
- Head coach: Thurlo McCrady (4th season)

The 1945 South Dakota State Jackrabbits football team was an American football team that represented South Dakota State University in the North Central Conference during the 1945 college football season. In its fourth season under head coach Thurlo McCrady, the team compiled a 1–4–1 record and was outscored by a total of 144 to 51.

== Schedule ==
Date	Opponent	Site	Result	Source
October 6	at Minot State	Minot, ND	L 6–33	
October 12	Drake	Brookings, SD	L 0–34	
October 20	Bemidji State	Brookings, SD	L 0–6	
October 27	Hamline^{†}	Brookings, SD	W 25–0	
November 3	Iowa State Teachers	Brookings, SD	L 7–58	
November 12	Concordia–Moorhead	Brookings, SD	T 13–13	
^{†}Homecoming
