= Kameron Cline =

American football player (born 1998)

Profile
- Position: Defensive end

Personal information
- Born: February 19, 1998 (age 28); San Diego, California, U.S.
- Listed height: 6 ft 4 in (1.93 m)
- Listed weight: 283 lb (128 kg)

Career information
- High school: Patrick Henry (CA)
- College: South Dakota (2016–2019)
- NFL draft: 2020: undrafted

Career history
- Indianapolis Colts (2020–2022); Buffalo Bills (2023–2024)*; New York Jets (2024)*; Buffalo Bills (2025)*
- * Offseason or practice squad member only

Career NFL statistics as of 2023
- Total tackles: 3
- Stats at Pro Football Reference

Kameron Cline (born February 19, 1998) is an American professional football defensive end. He was signed by the Colts as an undrafted free agent in 2020 following his college football career with the South Dakota Coyotes.

== Professional career ==
Pre-draft measurables
Height	Weight	Arm length	Hand span
6 ft 4 1/4 in (1.94 m)	283 lb (128 kg)	32 7/8 in (0.84 m)	9 1/8 in (0.23 m)
All values from Pro Day

=== Indianapolis Colts ===
Cline signed with the Indianapolis Colts as an undrafted free agent following the 2020 NFL draft on April 29, 2020. He was waived during final roster cuts on September 5, 2020, and signed to the team's practice squad the next day. He was elevated to the active roster on November 28 for the team's week 12 game against the Tennessee Titans where he recorded his first career tackle in the NFL and reverted to the practice squad after the game. On January 10, 2021, Cline signed a reserve/futures contract with the Colts.

On August 31, 2021, Cline was waived by the Colts and re-signed to the practice squad the next day. He signed a reserve/future contract on January 10, 2022.

On August 30, 2022, Cline was waived by the Colts and signed to the practice squad the next day. He was promoted to the active roster on December 31. He was waived on May 4, 2023.

=== Buffalo Bills ===
On May 5, 2023, Cline was claimed off waivers by the Buffalo Bills. He was waived on August 29, 2023, and re-signed to the practice squad. He signed a reserve/future contract on January 22, 2024.

On August 27, 2024, Cline was released by the Bills as part of final roster cuts, and re-signed to the practice squad. He was released on December 17.

=== New York Jets ===
On December 24, 2024, Cline was signed to the New York Jets practice squad.

=== Buffalo Bills (second stint) ===
On July 31, 2025, Cline signed with the Buffalo Bills, but was waived four days later.
