= Cletus Clinker =

American football player and coach (1911–1979)

Biographical details
- Born: January 6, 1911; Iowa, U.S.
- Died: January 12, 1979 (aged 68); Walnut Creek, California, U.S.

Playing career
- 1933: South Dakota
- Position: Quarterback

Coaching career (HC unless noted)
- 1936–1941: South Dakota (assistant)
- 1942: South Dakota
- 1946: South Dakota (assistant)
- 1950: Watertown HS (SD)
- 1960: Antioch HS (CA)

Head coaching record
- Overall: 5–3 (college)

Cletus Josiah "Red" Clinker (January 6, 1911 – January 12, 1979) was an American football player and coach. He served as the head football coach at the University of South Dakota in 1942, compiling a record of 5–3. After one season at the helm, Clinker reported for duty at the U. S. Navy Pre-Flight School in Chapel Hill, North Carolina. He died on January 12, 1979, in Walnut Creek, California.

== Head coaching record ==
=== College ===
Year	Team	Overall	Conference	Standing	Bowl/playoffs
South Dakota Coyotes (North Central Conference) (1942)
1942	South Dakota	5–3	4–2	3rd	
South Dakota:		5–3	4–2		
Total:		5–3			
