= 1942 South Dakota State Jackrabbits football team =

American college football season

1942 South Dakota State Jackrabbits football
- Conference: North Central Conference
- Record: 4–4 (3–3 NCC)
- Head coach: Thurlo McCrady (2nd season)
- Home stadium: State Field

1942 North Central Conference football standings
	Conf.					Overall
Team	W		L		T	W		L		T
Iowa State Teachers +	5	–	0	–	0	8	–	1	–	0
Augustana (SD) +	4	–	0	–	0	8	–	0	–	0
South Dakota	4	–	2	–	0	5	–	3	–	0
South Dakota State	3	–	3	–	0	4	–	4	–	0
North Dakota	2	–	3	–	0	3	–	3	–	0
North Dakota Agricultural	2	–	3	–	0	2	–	5	–	1
Morningside	1	–	6	–	0	2	–	6	–	0
Omaha	0	–	4	–	0	1	–	5	–	0
+ – Conference co-champions

The 1942 South Dakota State Jackrabbits football team was an American football team that represented South Dakota State University in the North Central Conference during the 1942 college football season. In its second season under head coach Thurlo McCrady, the team compiled a 4–4 record and was outscored by a total of 92 to 65.

South Dakota State was ranked at No. 263 (out of 590 college and military teams) in the final rankings under the Litkenhous Difference by Score System for 1942.

== Schedule ==
Date	Opponent	Site	Result	Attendance	Source
September 19	at Youngstown*	Youngstown, OH	L 0–14	5,000	
September 26	Iowa State Teachers	O. R. Latham Stadium; Cedar Falls, IA	L 0–38		
October 3	Omaha	Brookings, SD	W 20–0		
October 10	at Morningside	Sioux City, IA	W 3–0		
October 17	at North Dakota	Memorial Stadium; Grand Forks, ND	L 8–19		
October 24	South Dakota^{†}	Brookings, SD (rivalry, Hobo Day)	L 0–7		
October 31	North Dakota Agricultural	State Field; Brookings, SD (rivalry)	W 14–0		
November 7	Carleton*	State Field; Brookings, SD	W 20–14		
*Non-conference game; ^{†}Homecoming
