= Travis Johansen =

American football coach

Current position
- Title: Defensive coordinator
- Team: Rutgers
- Conference: Big Ten

Biographical details
- Born: Blaine, Minnesota, U.S.
- Education: Concordia University, St. Paul (2007)

Playing career
- 2003–2006: Concordia–St. Paul
- Positions: Linebacker, safety

Coaching career (HC unless noted)
- 2007–2010: Concordia–St. Paul (DB)
- 2011–2012: Concordia–St. Paul (DC)
- 2013–2018: Grand View (DC)
- 2019–2021: South Dakota (DC)
- 2022–2024: South Dakota (assoc. HC/DC)
- 2025: South Dakota
- 2026–present: Rutgers (DC)

Head coaching record
- Overall: 10–5
- Tournaments: 2–1 (NCAA D-I Playoffs)

Accomplishments and honors

Awards
- Concordia–St. Paul Hall of Fame (2021); First team All-NSIC (2005); Second team All-NSIC (2004)

Travis Johansen is an American college football coach. He is the defensive coordinator for Rutgers University, a position he has held since 2026. He was previously the head football coach at South Dakota. He also coached for Concordia–St. Paul and Grand View. He played college football for Concordia–St. Paul as a linebacker and was inducted into the Concordia–St. Paul Hall of Fame in 2021.

== Head coaching record ==
Year	Team	Overall	Conference	Standing	Bowl/playoffs	STATS^{#}	Coaches^{°}
South Dakota Coyotes (Missouri Valley Football Conference) (2025)
2025	South Dakota	10–5	6–2	2nd	L NCAA Division I Quarterfinal	9	11
South Dakota:		10–5	6–2				
Total:		10–5					
