= South Dakota Coyotes football =

College football team of University of South Dakota

2026 South Dakota Coyotes football team
- First season: 1889; 137 years ago
- Athletic director: Jon Schemmel
- Head coach: Matt Vitzthum; 1st season, 0–0 (–)
- Location: Vermillion, South Dakota
- Stadium: DakotaDome (capacity: 9,100)
- NCAA division: Division I FCS
- Conference: Missouri Valley
- Colors: Red and white
- All-time record: 587–568–36 (.508)

Conference championships
- NCC: 1927, 1938, 1939, 1947, 1951, 1972, 1973, 1974, 1978, 2005 MVFC: 2024
- Rivalries: South Dakota State (rivalry); North Dakota (Sitting Bull Trophy); North Dakota State
- Fight song: Hail, South Dakota!
- Mascot: Charlie Coyote
- Marching band: The Sound of USD
- Website: goyotes.com

The South Dakota Coyotes football team represents the University of South Dakota in college football. The team competes in the NCAA Division I Football Championship Subdivision (FCS) as a member of the Missouri Valley Football Conference (MVFC). The Coyotes play their home games at the 9,100-seat DakotaDome near the University's campus in Vermillion, South Dakota.

South Dakota first fielded a football team in 1889, and became one of the charter members of the North Central Conference (NCC) in 1922, where they remained for the next 86 years. During their time in the NCC, the Coyotes won 10 conference titles, qualified for the NCAA Division II playoffs four times, and reached the 1986 national championship game, losing to the North Dakota State Bison 27–7. The Coyotes moved up to the NCAA Division I FCS level in 2008, joining the Great West Conference initially, before entering the Missouri Valley Football Conference in 2012. Initially struggling in the Valley, the team found their footing under former head coach Bob Nielson, reaching four FCS playoffs from 2017 to 2024. The Coyotes won their first Missouri Valley title and reached their first FCS playoff semifinal appearance in school history in 2024.

Overall, the Coyotes have won eleven conference titles, and have a playoff record of 10–9 (.526).

== History ==
=== Classifications ===
- 1952–1972: NCAA College Division
- 1973–2007: NCAA Division II
- 2008–present: NCAA Division I FCS

=== Conference memberships ===
- 1889–1921, 1945: Independent
- 1922–1942, 1946–2007: North Central Intercollegiate Athletic Conference
- 2008–2011: Great West Football Conference
- 2012–present: Missouri Valley Football Conference

== Rivalries ==
=== South Dakota State ===
The Coyotes' main rivals are the South Dakota State Jackrabbits. The two schools have played each other since 1889, with the Jackrabbits currently holding the all-time series 58–53–7.

The series has been played yearly except for a pause between 2003 and 2012, when the Jackrabbits moved their athletic programs from Division II to Division I in 2004. The rivalry resumed in 2012 after the Coyotes joined the Missouri Valley Football Conference. The series is one of the oldest rivalries in college football, and the oldest between two public institutions at the FCS level.

=== North Dakota ===
The Coyotes historically shared a rivalry with the North Dakota Fighting Hawks, first meeting in 1903. The Fighting Hawks currently hold the all-time series 64–34–5. The rivalry was interrupted in 2011 after the two schools moved to separate conferences (the Big Sky Conference for North Dakota and the Missouri Valley Football Conference for South Dakota), but the series was renewed when the Fighting Hawks joined the Missouri Valley in 2021.

Both teams formerly fought for the Sitting Bull Trophy (an oak bust of Sitting Bull), but it was retired in 2000 amid an ongoing NCAA controversy over the use of Native American names and symbols by its member institutions.

== Championships ==
=== Conference championships ===
The Coyotes have won eleven conference championships, three outright and eight shared.

Year	Conference	Coach	Record	Conference Record
1927†	North Central Conference	Vincent E. Montgomery	7–2	5–0
1938	North Central Conference	Harry Gamage	7–1	5–0
1939†	North Central Conference	Harry Gamage	4–5	4–1
1947†	North Central Conference	Harry Gamage	7–2	4–0
1951	North Central Conference	Harry Gamage	7–1	6–0
1972†	North Central Conference	Joe Salem	9–1	6–1
1973†	North Central Conference	Joe Salem	8–3	6–1
1974†	North Central Conference	Joe Salem	8–3	5–2
1978	North Central Conference	Beanie Cooper	7–4	5–0–1^
2005†	North Central Conference	Ed Meierkort	9–2	4–2
2024†	Missouri Valley Football Conference	Bob Nielson	11–3	7–1

† Co-champions

^ South Dakota and Nebraska–Omaha split games in 1978, which counted as a tie in the NCC standings.

== Playoff appearances ==
=== NCAA Division II ===
The Coyotes have made four appearances in the NCAA Division II playoffs, with a combined record of 4–4.

Year	Round	Opponent	Result
1973	Quarterfinals	Boise State	L 10–53
1985	Quarterfinals; Semifinals	Central State (OH); North Dakota State	W 13–10 ^{2OT} L 7–16
1986	Quarterfinals; Semifinals; National Championship	UC Davis; Troy State; North Dakota State	W 26–23; W 42–28; L 7–27
2006	First Round; Second Round	Northwood; Grand Valley State	W 31–28; L 17–35

=== NCAA Division I-AA/FCS ===
The Coyotes have made five appearances in the Division I-AA/FCS playoffs, with an combined record of 6–5.

Year	Round	Opponent	Result
2017	First Round; Second Round	Nicholls State; Sam Houston State	W 38–31; L 42–54
2021	First Round	Southern Illinois	L 10–22
2023	Second Round; Quarterfinals	Sacramento State; North Dakota State	W 34–24; L 17–45
2024	Second Round; Quarterfinals; Semifinals	Tarleton State; UC Davis; Montana State	W 42–31; W 35–21; L 17–31
2025	First Round; Second Round; Quarterfinals	Drake; Mercer; Montana	W 38–17; W 47–0; L 22–52

== Head coaching history ==
The Coyotes have had 27 head coaches throughout the program's history. It is not known who coached the team between 1889–1900. South Dakota did not field teams in 1943 and 1944 due to World War II.

#	Coach	Years active	Record	Conference titles
1	Bert H. Morrison (manager)	1898–1899	5–2–1	No affiliation
2	Ralph Norton	1901	6–1–1	No affiliation
3	Arthur H. Whittemore	1902–1909, 1920–1921	37–21–6	No affiliation
4	Joseph Pipal	1910	5–2	No affiliation
5	James Henderson	1911–1913	15–5	No affiliation
6	Ion Cortright	1914–1915	9–4–3	No affiliation
7	Blaine McKusick	1916–1917	3–8–2	No affiliation
8	John W. Stewart	1918–1919	3–8	No affiliation
9	Stub Allison	1922–1926	20–19–3	
10	Vincent E. Montgomery	1927–1930	15–16–3	1927
11	Stanley G. Backman	1931–1933	11–16–1	
12	Harry Gamage	1934–1941, 1946–1955	82–67–7	1938, 1939, 1947, 1951
13	Cletus Clinker	1942	5–3	
14	Grant Heckenlively	1945	0–4	
15	Ralph Stewart	1956–1961	19–33–2	
16	Bob Burns	1962	1–9	
17	Marv Rist	1963–1965	6–21	
18	Joe Salem	1966–1974	51–39–2	1972, 1973, 1974
19	Beanie Cooper	1975–1978	18–24–1	1978
20	Dave Triplett	1979–1988	70–45	
21	John Fritsch	1989–1991	24–6	1964, 1965
22	Dennis Creehan	1992–1996	28–26	
23	Ron Rankin	1997–1998	8–14	
24	John Austin	1999–2003	22-32	
25	Ed Meierkort	2004–2011	54–35	2005
26	Joe Glenn	2012–2015	12–34	
27	Bob Nielson	2016–2024	53–48	2024
28	Travis Johansen	2025	10–5	
29	Matt Vitzthum	2026–present	0–0	

== Facilities ==
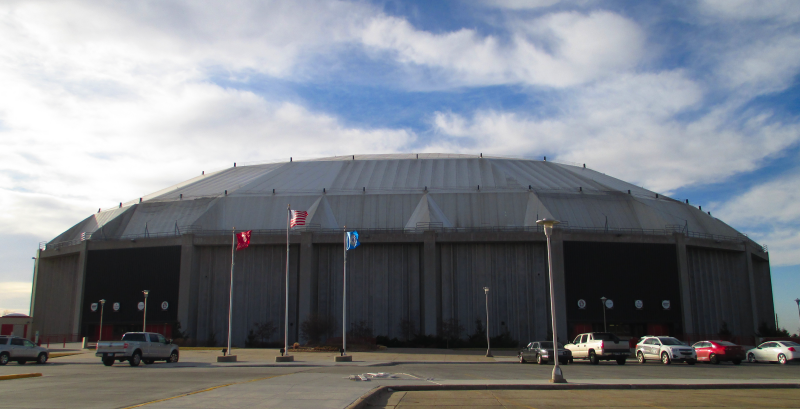
The DakotaDome.

The Coyotes have played in the DakotaDome since it opened in 1979. Seating 9,100 spectators, the Dome has been home to several Coyote sports teams over its 49 year history; alongside football, the DakotaDome formerly hosted Coyote basketball, volleyball, and swimming & diving. In addition to Coyote football, the Dome also hosts South Dakota's high school state football championships each November.

The DakotaDome has been renovated several times over the building's lifespan, most recently from 2019 to 2021 in a $26 million project that rebuilt the west side of the Dome. Improvements included permanent seating on the west side, new loge boxes and suites, a new locker room covering more than 6,000 square feet with 110 new lockers, new offices and equipment space, and a new concourse. As of 2025, plans are in place to renovate the west side of the Dome.

Before the DakotaDome, the Coyotes played on-campus at Inman Field from 1924 to 1978. The stadium seated 10,000 spectators and was located at the current site of the Knudson School of Law and Beacom Hall.

== Notable former players ==
Eighteen former Coyotes have been selected in the NFL draft. The most recent Coyote selected was Myles Harden in the 2024 NFL draft, who was selected by the Cleveland Browns in the 7th round.

Other notable alumni include:

- OT Tom Compton (2008–2011) - Selected in the 6th round of the 2012 NFL draft.
- QB Chris Streveler (2016–2017) - Grey Cup champion with the Winnipeg Blue Bombers (2019), played in the NFL for the Arizona Cardinals from 2020–2021, and for the New York Jets in 2022.
- LB Jack Cochrane (2017–2021) - Two-time Super Bowl champion with the Kansas City Chiefs (LVII, LVIII).
- RB Stefan Logan (2003–2006) - All-time leader in rushing yards for South Dakota, played as a punt returner for the Pittsburgh Steelers and the Detroit Lions.
- DE Ordell Braase (1951–1953) - Three-time NFL champion with the Baltimore Colts (1958, 1959, 1968).
- LB Matt Chatham (1994–1998) - Three-time Super Bowl champion with the New England Patriots (XXXVI, XXXVIII, XXXIX).
- LB Tyler Starr (2011–2013) - Selected in the 7th round of the 2014 NFL draft.
- DE Kameron Cline (2016–2019) - Played for the Indianapolis Colts and the Buffalo Bills.
- P Filip Filipovic (1999–2002) - Played for the Dallas Cowboys.
- RB Jamel White (1996–1999) - Played for the Cleveland Browns, the Tampa Bay Buccaneers, and the Baltimore Ravens as a punt returner and running back.
- LB Brock Mogensen (2018–2023) - MVFC Defensive Player of the Year in 2023, played for the Dallas Cowboys.
- RB Travis Theis (2019–2024) - Plays for the Montreal Alouettes in the CFL.

== Record against FBS opposition ==
The Coyotes have played sixteen times against teams from NCAA Division I FBS since moving up to NCAA Division I FCS in 2008; they are 2–16 overall.

Season	Opponent	Conference	Result
2010	UCF	Conference USA	L 7–38
2010	Minnesota	Big Ten	W 41–38
2011	Air Force	Mountain West	L 20–37
2011	Wisconsin	Big Ten	L 10–59
2012	Northwestern	Big Ten	L 7–38
2013	Kansas	Big 12	L 14–31
2014	No. 3 Oregon	Pac-12	L 13–62
2015	Kansas State	Big 12	L 0–34
2016	New Mexico	Mountain West	L 21–48
2017	Bowling Green	MAC	W 35–27
2018	Kansas State	Big 12	L 24–27
2019	No. 4 Oklahoma	Big 12	L 14–70
2021	Kansas	Big 12	L 14–17
2022	Kansas State	Big 12	L 0–34
2023	Missouri	SEC	L 10–35
2024	Wisconsin	Big Ten	L 13–27
2025	No. 22 Iowa State	Big 12	L 7–55
2026	Boise State	Pac-12	L 24–38

== Future non-conference opponents ==
Announced schedules as of October 29, 2026.

2027	2028	2029	2030	2031	2032
Drake	Abilene Christian	Drake	at Iowa State	at Montana State	Montana State
at Kansas State		at Abilene Christian	Portland State		
at Eastern Washington		Idaho	at Idaho		
