= Matt Vitzthum =

American football coach

Matt Vitzhum
Current position
- Title: Head coach
- Team: South Dakota
- Conference: MVFC
- Record: 1–0

Biographical details
- Education: Wartburg College (2009)

Coaching career (HC unless noted)
- 2009–2011: St. Cloud (GA/RB/TE)
- 2012: Wittenberg (QB)
- 2013: Grand Valley State (RB)
- 2014–2019: Grand Valley State (QB)
- 2020–2023: Grand Valley State (OC/QB)
- 2024: South Dakota (WR)
- 2025: South Dakota (co-OC/QB)
- 2026–present: South Dakota

Head coaching record
- Overall: 1–0

Matt Vitzthum is an American football coach who is currently the head coach for the South Dakota Coyotes.

== Coaching career ==
Vitzthum got his first coaching job at St. Cloud State in 2009 as a running backs and tight ends coach. In 2012, he left to become the quarterbacks coach for Wittenberg. After just one season, Vitzthum was hired to be the quarterbacks coach at Grand Valley State. Before the start of the 2020 season, he was promoted by Grand Valley State to be the team's offensive coordinator. In 2024, he was hired by South Dakota to coach the team's wide receivers. Ahead of the 2025 season Vitzthum was promoted to also serve as the team's co-offensive coordinator. On February 7, 2026, he was promoted to serve as the next head coach for South Dakota.

== Personal life ==
Vitzthum is married to his wife, Ashley. Together they have a son and a daughter.

Vitzthum's niece, Audi Crooks, currently plays basketball for Oklahoma State and led the NCAA in scoring during the 2024–25 season.
