= 2025 South Dakota State Jackrabbits football team =

American college football season

2025 South Dakota State Jackrabbits football

NCAA Division I Second Round, L 29–50 vs. Montana
- Conference: Missouri Valley Football Conference

Ranking
- STATS: No. 13
- FCS Coaches: No. 14
- Record: 9–5 (4–4 MVFC)
- Head coach: Dan Jackson (1st season)
- Offensive coordinator: Eric Eidsness (14th season)
- Offensive scheme: Spread
- Defensive coordinator: Brian Bergstrom (4th season)
- Base defense: 4–3
- Home stadium: Dana J. Dykhouse Stadium

2025 Missouri Valley Football Conference standings
	Conf.			Overall
Team	W		L	W		L
No. 4т North Dakota State $^	8	–	0	12	–	1
No. 9 South Dakota ^	6	–	2	10	–	5
No. 2 Illinois State ^	5	–	3	12	–	5
No. 14 North Dakota ^	5	–	3	8	–	6
No. 18 Youngstown State ^	5	–	3	8	–	5
No. 13 South Dakota State ^	4	–	4	9	–	5
No. 25 Southern Illinois	4	–	4	7	–	5
Northern Iowa	1	–	7	3	–	9
Murray State	1	–	7	1	–	11
Indiana State	1	–	7	3	–	9
$ – Conference champion; ^ – FCS playoff participant; Rankings from STATS Poll

The 2025 South Dakota State Jackrabbits football team represented South Dakota State University during the 2025 NCAA Division I FCS football season, as a member of the Missouri Valley Football Conference (MVFC). They were led by first-year head coach Dan Jackson who joins the program after working at Idaho as the team's defensive coordinator. He is replacing former coach Jimmy Rogers who left the program to be the head coach at Washington State. Jackson is assisted by first year offensive coordinator Eric Eidsness and defensive coordinator Brian Bergstrom. The Jacks played home games at Dana J. Dykhouse Stadium in Brookings, South Dakota.

== Preseason ==
=== MVFC poll ===
The Missouri Valley Football Conference released its preseason poll on July 21, 2025, voted on by league athletic directors, coaches, and media members. The Jackrabbits were predicted to finish second in the conference.

== Offseason ==
=== Transfers ===
==== Outgoing ====
Player	Position	Destination
Abraham Hoskins III	DB	Central Missouri
Davin Stoffel	TE	Illinois
Bryce Hawthorne	DL	Iowa
Mark Gronowski	QB	Iowa
Joey Vieth	LB	Nebraska–Kearney
Tak Tateoka	QB	Northern Arizona
Griffin Wilde	WR	Northwestern
Evan Beerntsen	OL	Northwestern
Max Elrod	DL	Sioux Falls
Kentrell Prejean	WR	Southeastern Louisiana
Dawson Rudd	OL	Tarleton State
Max Baloun	DL	Washington State
Tucker Large	S	Washington State
Matthew Durrance	S	Washington State
Angel Johnson	RB	Washington State
Kirby Vorhees	RB	Washington State
Cale Reeder	DB	Washington State
Caleb Francl	LB	Washington State
Jack Stevens	K	Washington State
Fernando Lecuona	DE	Washington State
Carsten Reynolds	LB	Washington State
Colby Humphrey	DB	Washington State
Trey Ridley	S	Washington State
Maxwell Woods	RB	Washington State
Nick Bakken	OL	Washington State
Anthony Palano	LB	Washington State
Beau Baker	TE	Washington State

==== Incoming ====
Player	Position	Previous school
Isaiah Johnson	DB	Bemidji State
Kevin Carrigan Jr.	K	Bloomsburg
Jayden Oliver	DB	Buffalo
Jason Thome	S	Colorado Mesa
John Pica	OL	Dakota Wesleyan
Ernest Blackshire Jr.	LB	DuPage
Jamari Holliman	DB	FIU
Julius Loughridge	RB	Fordham
Jalyn Thompson	TE	Iowa
Graham Eben	LB	Iowa
Reese Osgood	WR	Iowa
Brody Targgart	DL	Iowa Western CC
Jackson Powers	DB	Minnesota
Koby Bretz	DB	Nebraska
Isaiah Garcia-Castaneda	WR	Nebraska
Alex Bullock	WR	Nebraska
Luke Marble	QB	Northern Illinois
Eli Stader	K	Northwestern (IA)
Coleman Kuntz	TE	Sacramento State
Mason Brosseau	DT	Sacramento State
Tak Tateoka	QB	St. Thomas
Nate Adams	OL	Stephen F. Austin
Max Elrod	DL	Sioux Falls
Matt Goehring	LB	Sioux Falls
Kevin Carrigan	P/K	UCF
Kevin Spelman	DL	Valparaiso
Nate White	RB	Wisconsin

== Schedule ==
Date	Time	Opponent	Rank	Site	TV	Result	Attendance
August 30	6:00 p.m.	No. 15 Sacramento State*	No. 3	Dana J. Dykhouse Stadium; Brookings, SD	ESPN+	W 20–3	19,163
September 6	7:00 p.m.	at No. 3 Montana State*	No. 2	Bobcat Stadium; Bozeman, MT	ESPN+	W 30–24 ^{2OT}	22,117
September 13	6:00 p.m.	Drake*	No. 2	Dana J. Dykhouse Stadium; Brookings, SD	ESPN+	W 37–21	19,213
September 27	2:00 p.m.	Mercyhurst*	No. 2	Dana J. Dykhouse Stadium; Brookings, SD	ESPN+	W 51–7	19,034
October 4	5:00 p.m.	at No. 24 Youngstown State	No. 2	Stambaugh Stadium; Youngstown, OH	ESPN+	W 35–30	11,068
October 11	2:00 p.m.	Northern Iowa	No. 2	Dana J. Dykhouse Stadium; Brookings, SD	ESPN+	W 31–3	19,342
October 18	6:00 p.m.	at Murray State	No. 2	Roy Stewart Stadium; Murray, KY	ESPN+	W 35−14	6,746
October 25	7:00 p.m.	No. 1 North Dakota State	No. 2	Dana J. Dykhouse Stadium; Brookings, SD (Dakota Marker)	ESPNU	L 7–38	19,477
November 1	2:00 p.m.	Indiana State	No. 4т	Dana J. Dykhouse Stadium; Brookings, SD	ESPN+	L 12–24	15,842
November 8	3:00 p.m.	at No. 22 South Dakota	No. 8	DakotaDome; Vermillion, SD (rivalry)	ESPNU	L 17–24	9,159
November 15	2:00 p.m.	No. 14 Illinois State	No. 16	Dana J. Dykhouse Stadium; Brookings, SD	ESPN+	L 21–35	11,407
November 22	1:00 p.m.	at No. 13 North Dakota	No. 22	Alerus Center; Grand Forks, ND	ESPN+	W 34–31 ^{OT}	11,396
November 29	12:00 p.m.	No. 22 New Hampshire*	No. 16	Dana J. Dykhouse Stadium; Brookings, SD (NCAA Division I First Round)	ESPN+	W 41–3	3,843
December 6	1:00 p.m.	at No. 3 Montana*	No. 16	Washington–Grizzly Stadium; Missoula, MT (NCAA Division I Second Round)	ESPN+	L 29–50	18,197
*Non-conference game; Rankings from STATS Poll released prior to the game; All times are in Central time; Source:

== Game summaries ==
All times are Central Time.

=== Regular season ===
==== No. 15 Sacramento State ====
No. 15 Sacramento State Hornets (0–0) at No. 3 South Dakota State Jackrabbits (0–0) – Game summary

Quarter	1	2	3	4	Total
No. 15 Hornets	3	0	0	0	3
No. 3 Jackrabbits	3	14	0	3	20

at Dana J. Dykhouse Stadium, Brookings, SD

- Date: August 30
- Game time: 6:00 p.m.
- Game weather: Sunny • Temperature: 74 °F (23 °C) • Wind: E at 10 miles per hour (16 km/h)
- Game attendance: 19,163
- Referee: Gregory Gompf
- TV announcers (ESPN+): Tyler Merriam (play-by-play) and Kurtiss Riggs (analyst)

Game information
First quarter
- (8:11) SDST – Eli Stader 22-yard field goal (Drive: 5 plays, 43 yards, 1:52; South Dakota State 3–0)
- (5:18) SAC – Grant Meadors 36-yard field goal (Drive: 4 plays, 5 yards, 1:52; Tied 3–3)

Second quarter

- (12:38) SDST – Andrew Gustad 4-yard pass from Chase Mason, Eli Stader kick (Drive: 15 plays, 75 yards, 7:34; South Dakota State 10–3)
- (3:51) SDST – Lofton O'Groske 3-yard run, Eli Stader kick (Drive: 8 plays, 69 yards, 4:54; South Dakota State 17–3)

Third quarter

- No scoring plays

Fourth quarter

- (2:27) SDST – Eli Stader 28-yard field goal (Drive: 8 plays, 55 yards, 5:13; South Dakota State 20–3)

Statistics	SAC	SDST
First downs	7	28
Total yards	131	430
Rushing yards	24	240
Passing yards	107	190
Passing: Comp–Att–Int	11–27–1	17–23–0
Turnovers	2	2
Time of possession	18:54	41:06

Team	Category	Player	Statistics
Sacramento State	Passing	Jaden Rashada	11/27, 107 yards, INT
Sacramento State	Rushing	Rodney Hammond Jr.	6 carries, 12 yards
Sacramento State	Receiving	Jordan Anderson	4 receptions, 49 yards
South Dakota State	Passing	Chase Mason	17/23, 190 yards, TD
South Dakota State	Rushing	Julius Loughridge	22 carries, 159 yards
South Dakota State	Receiving	Lofton O'Groske	5 receptions, 76 yards

==== at No. 3 Montana State ====
No. 2 South Dakota State Jackrabbits (1–0) at No. 3 Montana State Bobcats (0–1) – Game summary

Quarter	1	2	3	4	OT	2OT	Total
No. 2 Jackrabbits	3	7	0	7	7	6	30
No. 3 Bobcats	0	10	0	7	7	0	24

at Bobcat Stadium, Bozeman, MT

- Date: September 6
- Game time: 7:00 p.m.
- Game weather: Sunny • Temperature: 81 °F (27 °C) • Wind: NW at 1 mile per hour (1.6 km/h)
- Game attendance: 22,117
- Referee: Kelly Holman
- TV announcers (ESPN+): Ben Creighton (play-by-play), Ty Gregorak (analyst) and Grace Lawrence (sideline)

Game information
First quarter
- (9:02) SDST – Eli Stader 25-yard field goal (Drive: 11 plays, 68 yards, 5:58; South Dakota State 3–0)

Second quarter

- (10:47) MTST – Justin Lamson 7-yard run, Myles Sansted kick (Drive: 9 plays, 88 yards, 4:07; Montana State 7-3)
- (1:06) SDST – Chase Mason 8-yard run, Eli Stader kick (Drive: 2 plays, 21 yards, 0:46; South Dakota State 10–7)
- (0:00) MTST – Myles Sansted 33-yard field goal (Drive: 6 plays, 45 yards, 1:00; Tied 10–10)

Third quarter

- No scoring plays

Fourth quarter

- (9:08) SDST – Lofton O'Groske 8-yard pass from Chase Mason, Eli Stader kick (Drive: 7 plays, 50 yards, 3:40; South Dakota State 17–10)
- (6:37) MTST – Seth Brock 2-yard fumble return, Myles Sansted kick (Drive: 4 plays, -11 yards, 1:38; Tied 17–17)

Overtime

- MTST – Adam Jones 2-yard run, Myles Sansted kick (Drive: 6 plays, 25 yards; Montana State 24–17)
- SDST – Lofton O'Groske 2-yard pass from Chase Mason, Eli Stader kick (Drive: 2 plays, 25 yards; Tied 24–24)

Second overtime

- SDST – Baryden Delahoyde 25-yard pass from Chase Mason, Chase Mason conversion pass failed (Drive: 1 play, 25 yards; South Dakota State 30–24)

Statistics	SDST	MTST
First downs	16	17
Total yards	65–297	349
Rushing yards	123	210
Passing yards	174	139
Passing: Comp–Att–Int	17–25–0	19–29–0
Turnovers	2	2
Time of possession	33:05	26:55

Team	Category	Player	Statistics
South Dakota State	Passing	Chase Mason	17/25, 174 yards, 3 TD
South Dakota State	Rushing	Julius Loughridge	23 carries, 99 yards
South Dakota State	Receiving	Lofton O'Groske	12 receptions, 125 yards, 2 TD
Montana State	Passing	Justin Lamson	18/28, 123 yards
Montana State	Rushing	Justin Lamson	20 carries, 96 yards, TD
Montana State	Receiving	Dane Steel	3 receptions, 49 yards

==== Drake ====
Drake Bulldogs (1–0) at No. 2 South Dakota State Jackrabbits (2–0) – Game summary

Quarter	1	2	3	4	Total
Bulldogs	7	3	8	3	21
No. 2 Jackrabbits	14	7	10	6	37

at Dana J. Dykhouse Stadium, Brookings, SD

- Date: September 13
- Game time: 6:00 p.m.
- Game weather: Sunny • Temperature: 85 °F (29 °C) • Wind: S at 5 miles per hour (8.0 km/h)
- Game attendance: 19,213
- Referee: Jason Perkins
- TV announcers (ESPN+): Tom Nieman (play-by-play), Kurtiss Riggs (analyst) and Darron Wallace (sideline)

Game information
First quarter
- (12:53) DRKE – Hank Foley 31-yard pass from Xavier Washington, Harry Balke kick (Drive: 5 plays, 75 yards, 2:07; Drake 7–0)
- (6:34) SDST – Alex Bullock 9-yard pass from Chase Mason, Eli Stader kick (Drive: 3 plays, 40 yards, 1:03; Tied 7–7)
- (5:59) SDST – Julius Loughridge 15-yard run, Eli Stader kick (Drive: 2 plays, 19 yards, 0:35; South Dakota State 14–7)

Second quarter

- (14:56) DRKE – Harry Balke 41-yard field goal (Drive: 5 plays, 24 yards, 2:13; South Dakota State 14–10)
- (5:59) SDST – James Basinger 2-yard run, Eli Stader kick (Drive: 12 plays, 66 yards, 6:41; South Dakota State 21–10)

Third quarter

- (11:09) SDST – Julius Loughridge 4-yard run, Eli Stader kick (Drive: 8 plays, 65 yards, 3:51; South Dakota State 28–10)
- (7:28) DRKE – Logan Inagawa 3-yard run, Nick Herman pass to Logan Inagawa for two-point conversion (Drive: 7 plays, 75 yards, 3:41; South Dakota State 28–18)
- (1:57) SDST – Ryan Harrington 39-yard field goal (Drive: 5 plays, 24 yards, 2:13; South Dakota State 31–18)

Fourth quarter

- (8:10) SDST – Corey Blair Jr. 5-yard run, Chase Mason conversion pass failed (Drive: 10 plays, 59 yards, 5:05; South Dakota State 37–18)
- (0:04) DRKE – Harry Balke 24-yard field goal (Drive: 18 plays, 68 yards, 8:06; South Dakota State 37–21)

Statistics	DRKE	SDST
First downs	18	23
Total yards	295	436
Rushing yards	121	211
Passing yards	174	225
Passing: Comp–Att–Int	18-29-1	18-25-0
Time of possession	27:30	32:30

Team	Category	Player	Statistics
Drake	Passing	Logan Inagawa	15/25, 140 yards, INT
Drake	Rushing	Logan Inagawa	14 carries, 58 yards, TD
Drake	Receiving	Hank Foley	3 receptions, 54 yards, TD
South Dakota State	Passing	Chase Mason	18/25, 225 yards, TD
South Dakota State	Rushing	Julius Loughridge	20 carries, 83 yards, 2 TD
South Dakota State	Receiving	Lofton O'Groske	6 receptions, 78 yards

==== Mercyhurst ====
Mercyhurst Lakers (1–3) at No. 2 South Dakota State Jackrabbits (3–0) – Game summary

Quarter	1	2	3	4	Total
Lakers	0	7	0	0	7
No. 2 Jackrabbits	17	6	14	14	51

at Dana J. Dykhouse Stadium, Brookings, SD

- Date: September 27
- Game time: 2:00 p.m.
- Game weather: Sunny • Temperature: 72 °F (22 °C) • Wind: S at 7 miles per hour (11 km/h)
- Game attendance: 19,034
- Referee: Gregory Gompf
- TV: ESPN+

Game information
First quarter
- (10:03) SDST – Eli Stader 36-yard field goal (Drive: 11 plays, 43 yards, 4:51; South Dakota State 3–0)
- (4:20) SDST – Alex Bullock 28-yard pass from Chase Mason, Eli Stader kick (Drive: 7 plays, 55 yards, 3:35; South Dakota State 10–0)
- (3:56) SDST – Lofton O'Groske 19-yard pass from Chase Mason, Eli Stader kick (Drive: 1 play, 19 yards, 0:06; South Dakota State 17–0)

Second quarter

- (13:38) MERC – Evan Van Dyke 22-yard pass from Adam Urena, Max Young kick (Drive: 11 plays, 75 yards, 5:18; South Dakota State 17–7)
- (5:12) SDST – Eli Stader 25-yard field goal (Drive: 14 plays, 76 yards, 8:20; South Dakota State 20–7)
- (0:00) SDST – Eli Stader 28-yard field goal (Drive: 7 plays, 26 yards, 1:50; South Dakota State 23–7)

Third quarter

- (9:59) SDST – Jack Smith 18-yard pass from Chase Mason, Eli Stader kick (Drive: 5 plays, 42 yards, 2:39; South Dakota State 30–7)
- (4:23) SDST – James Basinger 1-yard run, Eli Stader kick (Drive: 4 plays, 70 yards, 1:07; South Dakota State 37–7)

Fourth quarter

- (12:48) SDST – Brenden Begeman 5-yard run, Eli Stader kick (Drive: 9 plays, 61 yards, 4:48; South Dakota State 44–7)
- (1:55) SDST – James Basinger 1-yard run, Eli Stader kick (Drive: 14 plays, 67 yards, 9:19; South Dakota State 51–7)

Statistics	MERC	SDST
First downs	9	26
Total yards	154	469
Rushing yards	41	126
Passing yards	113	343
Passing: Comp–Att–Int	13–20–2	24–32–0
Time of possession	23:13	36:47

Team	Category	Player	Statistics
Mercyhurst	Passing	Adam Urena	12/18, 103 yards, TD, 2 INT
Mercyhurst	Rushing	Brian Trobel	9 carries, 22 yards
Mercyhurst	Receiving	Evan Van Dyke	5 receptions, 62 yards, TD
South Dakota State	Passing	Chase Mason	21/29, 321 yards, 3 TD
South Dakota State	Rushing	James Basinger	15 carries, 53 yards, 2 TD
South Dakota State	Receiving	Grahm Goering	7 receptions, 101 yards

==== at No. 24 Youngstown State ====
No. 2 South Dakota State Jackrabbits (4–0) vs. No. 24 Youngstown State Penguins (3–1) – Game summary

Quarter	1	2	3	4	Total
No. 2 Jackrabbits	0	7	21	7	35
No. 24 Penguins	7	10	0	13	30

at Stambaugh Stadium, Youngstown, OH

- Date: October 4
- Game time: 5:00 p.m.
- Game weather: Sunny • Temperature: 82 °F (28 °C) • Wind: SW at 5 miles per hour (8.0 km/h)
- Game attendance: 11,068
- Referee: John Shay
- TV announcers (ESPN+): Drae Smith (play-by-play) and Frank Stams (analyst)

Game information
First quarter
- (11:52) YSU – Max Tomczak 23-yard pass from Beau Brungard, Andrew Lastovka kick (Drive: 3 plays, 47 yards, 1:17; Youngstown State 7–0)

Second quarter

- (14:00) YSU – Beau Brungard 4-yard run, Andrew Lastovka kick (Drive: 15 plays, 80 yards, 6:59; Youngstown State 14–0)
- (4:58) SDST – Greyton Gannon 4-yard pass from Chase Mason, Eli Stader kick (Drive: 9 plays, 90 yards, 3:41; Youngstown State 14–7)
- (2:23) YSU – Andrew Lastovka 29-yard field goal (Drive: 5 plays, 71 yards, 2:29; Youngstown State 17–7)

Third quarter

- (12:50) SDST – Julius Loughridge 3-yard run, Eli Stader kick (Drive: 2 plays, 54 yards, 0:35; Youngstown State 17–14)
- (5:54) SDST – Julius Loughridge 14-yard run, Eli Stader kick (Drive: 7 plays, 75 yards, 3:49; South Dakota State 21–17)
- (2:18) SDST – Julius Loughridge 2-yard run, Eli Stader kick (Drive: 6 plays, 57 yards, 2:35; South Dakota State 28–17)

Fourth quarter

- (10:31) YSU – Max Tomczak 29-yard pass from Beau Brungard, Andrew Lastovka kick (Drive: 3 plays, 59 yards, 1:26; South Dakota State 28–24)
- (3:17) SDST – Julius Loughridge 24-yard run, Eli Stader kick (Drive: 3 plays, 40 yards, 1:43; South Dakota State 35–24)
- (0:38) YSU – Max Tomczak 2-yard pass from Beau Brungard, Beau Brungard conversion pass failed (Drive: 10 plays, 72 yards, 2:37; South Dakota State 35–30)

Statistics	SDST	YSU
First downs	20	25
Total yards	405	431
Rushing yards	216	156
Passing yards	189	275
Passing: Comp–Att–Int	14–29–1	29–44–0
Time of possession	29:31	30:29

Team	Category	Player	Statistics
South Dakota State	Passing	Chase Mason	14/29, 189 yards, TD, INT
South Dakota State	Rushing	Julius Loughridge	25 carries, 176 yards, 4 TD
South Dakota State	Receiving	Alex Bullock	10 receptions, 162 yards
Youngstown State	Passing	Beau Brungard	29/44, 275 yards, 3 TD
Youngstown State	Rushing	Beau Brungard	22 carries, 130 yards, TD
Youngstown State	Receiving	Max Tomczak	8 receptions, 92 yards, 3 TD

==== Northern Iowa ====
Northern Iowa Panthers (2–3) vs. No. 2 South Dakota State Jackrabbits (5–0) – Game summary

Quarter	1	2	3	4	Total
Panthers	0	3	0	0	3
No. 2 Jackrabbits	7	7	7	10	31

at Dana J. Dykhouse Stadium, Brookings, SD

- Date: October 11
- Game time: 2:00 p.m.
- Game weather: Cloudy • Temperature: 64 °F (18 °C) • Wind: S at 15 miles per hour (24 km/h)
- Game attendance: 19,342
- Referee: Tyler Downs
- TV announcers (ESPN+): Tyler Merriam (play-by-play) and Kurtiss Riggs (analyst)

Game information
First quarter
- (4:31) SDST – Chase Mason 2-yard run, Eli Stader kick (Drive: 7 plays, 37 yards, 3:11; South Dakota State 7–0)

Second quarter

- (4:23) UNI – Max Bartachek 30-yard field goal (Drive: 13 plays, 67 yards, 7:24; South Dakota State 7–3)
- (2:02) SDST – Chase Mason 2-yard run, Eli Stader kick (Drive: 6 plays, 75 yards, 2:21; South Dakota State 14–3)

Third quarter

- (1:14) SDST – Greyton Gannon 22-yard pass from Chase Mason, Eli Stader kick (Drive: 6 plays, 77 yards, 3:04; South Dakota State 21–3)

Fourth quarter

- (11:06) SDST – Andrew Gustad 11-yard pass from Chase Mason, Eli Stader kick (Drive: 6 plays, 49 yards, 2:29; South Dakota State 28–3)
- (3:58) SDST – Eli Stader 30-yard field goal (Drive: 12 plays, 72 yards, 4:57; South Dakota State 31–3)

Statistics	UNI	SDST
First downs	14	24
Total yards	221	382
Rushing yards	78	120
Passing yards	143	262
Passing: Comp–Att–Int	14-27-4	20-33-0
Time of possession	28:01	31:59

Team	Category	Player	Statistics
Northern Iowa	Passing	Matthew Shecklman	12/20, 125 yards, 2 INT
Northern Iowa	Rushing	Bill Jackson	10 carries, 29 yards
Northern Iowa	Receiving	Tysen Kershaw	2 receptions, 48 yards
South Dakota State	Passing	Chase Mason	19/31, 251 yards, 2 TD
South Dakota State	Rushing	Julius Loughridge	19 carries, 76 yards
South Dakota State	Receiving	Alex Bullock	5 receptions, 82 yards

==== at Murray State ====
No. 2 South Dakota State Jackrabbits (6–0) vs. Murray State Racers (0–6) – Game summary

Quarter	1	2	3	4	Total
No. 2 Jackrabbits	7	7	7	14	35
Racers	7	0	0	7	14

at Roy Stewart Stadium, Murray, KY

- Date: October 18
- Game time: 5:00 p.m.
- Game weather: Sunny • Temperature: 80 °F (27 °C) • Wind: S at 14 miles per hour (23 km/h)
- Game attendance: 6,746
- Referee: Gregory Gompf
- TV announcers (ESPN+): Casey Roehl (play-by-play) and Drayton Charlton-Perrin (analyst)

Game information
First quarter
- (5:51) SDST – Chase Mason 6-yard run, Eli Stader kick (Drive: 14 plays, 82 yards, 7:24; South Dakota State 7–0)
- (3:06) MUR – Darius Cannon 65-yard pass from Jim Ogle, Jack Tannehill kick (Drive: 2 plays, 80 yards, 0:36; Tied 7–7)

Second quarter

- (7:14) SDST – Jack Smith 10-yard pass from Luke Marble, Eli Stader kick (Drive: 6 plays, 88 yards, 1:51; South Dakota State 14–7)

Third quarter

- (13:49) SDST – Jack Smith 46-yard pass from Luke Marble, Eli Stader kick (Drive: 4 plays, 59 yards, 1:04; South Dakota State 21–7)

Fourth quarter

- (13:15) SDST – Josiah Johnson 1-yard run, Eli Stader kick (Drive: 9 plays, 47 yards, 4:05; South Dakota State 28–7)
- (12:10) MUR – Jordan Washington 60-yard pass from Jim Ogle, Jack Tannehill kick (Drive: 3 plays, 68 yards, 1:05; South Dakota State 28–14)
- (5:51) SDST – James Basinger 6-yard run, Eli Stader kick (Drive: 10 plays, 52 yards, 5:52; South Dakota State 35–14)

Statistics	SDST	MUR
First downs	25	20
Total yards	469	438
Rushing yards	211	111
Passing yards	258	327
Passing: Comp–Att–Int	18-27-1	20-32-4
Time of possession	35:55	24:05

Team	Category	Player	Statistics
South Dakota State	Passing	Luke Marble	13/21, 189 yards, 2 TD, INT
South Dakota State	Rushing	Julius Loughridge	25 carries, 88 yards
South Dakota State	Receiving	Alex Bullock	6 receptions, 99 yards
Murray State	Passing	Jim Ogle	20/32, 327 yards, 2 TD, 4 INT
Murray State	Rushing	Jordan Washington	13 carries, 56 yards
Murray State	Receiving	Darius Cannon	5 receptions, 100 yards, TD

==== No. 1 North Dakota State (Dakota Marker) ====
No. 1 North Dakota State Bison (7–0) vs. No. 2 South Dakota State Jackrabbits (7–0) – Game summary

Quarter	1	2	3	4	Total
No. 1 Bison	14	17	0	7	38
No. 2 Jackrabbits	0	7	0	0	7

at Dana J. Dykhouse Stadium, Brookings, SD

- Date: October 25
- Game time: 7:00 p.m.
- Game weather: Cloudy • Temperature: 57 °F (14 °C) • Wind: SE at 14 miles per hour (23 km/h)
- Game attendance: 19,477
- Referee: David Hergert
- TV announcers (ESPNU): Richard Cross (play-by-play), Taylor McHargue (analyst), Tori Petry (sideline)

Game information
First quarter
- (5:11) NDSU – Cole Payton 1-yard run, Eli Ozick kick (Drive: 16 plays, 84 yards, 9:00; North Dakota State 7–0)
- (0:16) NDSU – Cole Payton 2-yard run, Eli Ozick kick (Drive: 5 plays, 63 yards, 3:00; North Dakota State 14–0)

Second quarter

- (10:55) NDSU – Barika Kpeenu 2-yard run, Eli Ozick kick (Drive: 7 plays, 68 yards, 3:48; North Dakota State 21–0)
- (5:54) SDSU – Lofton O'Groske 17-yard pass from Luke Marble, Eli Stader kick (Drive: 2 plays, 43 yards, 0:28; North Dakota State 21–7)
- (2:38) NDSU – Cole Payton 57-yard run, Eli Ozick kick (Drive: 5 plays, 70 yards, 3:10; North Dakota State 28–7)
- (0:02) NDSU – Eli Ozick 43-yard field goal (Drive: 10 plays, 49 yards, 0:58; North Dakota State 31–7)

Third quarter

- No scoring plays

Fourth quarter

- (11:55) NDSU – Cole Payton 47-yard run, Eli Ozick kick (Drive: 1 play, 47 yards, 0:09; North Dakota State 38–7)

Statistics	NDSU	SDST
First downs	24	11
Total yards	500	166
Rushing yards	257	43
Passing yards	243	123
Passing: Comp–Att–Int	18–24–1	9–19–0
Time of possession	38:01	21:59

Team	Category	Player	Statistics
North Dakota State	Passing	Cole Payton	18/23, 243 yards, INT
North Dakota State	Rushing	Cole Payton	17 carries, 137 yards, 4 TD
North Dakota State	Receiving	Bryce Lance	5 receptions, 103 yards
South Dakota State	Passing	Luke Marble	7/16, 89 yards, TD
South Dakota State	Rushing	Julius Loughridge	10 carries, 38 yards
South Dakota State	Receiving	Lofton O'Groske	2 receptions, 43 yards, TD

==== Indiana State ====
Indiana State Sycamores (2–6) vs. No. 4т South Dakota State Jackrabbits (7–1) – Game summary

Quarter	1	2	3	4	Total
Sycamores	7	3	7	7	24
No. 4т Jackrabbits	3	3	0	6	12

at Dana J. Dykhouse Stadium, Brookings, SD

- Date: November 1
- Game time: 2:00 p.m.
- Game weather: Cloudy • Temperature: 41 °F (5 °C) • Wind: N at 5 miles per hour (8.0 km/h)
- Game attendance: 15,842
- Referee: Jason Perkins
- TV announcers (ESPN+): Tyler Merriam (play-by-play) and Kurtiss Riggs (analyst)

Game information
First quarter
- (11:39) SDST – Eli Stader 44-yard field goal (Drive: 9 plays, 50 yards, 3:17; South Dakota State 3–0)
- (11:25) INST – Rashad Rochelle 95-yard kickoff return, Sebastian Lopez kick (Drive: 0 plays, 0 yards, 0:00; Indiana State 7–3)

Second quarter

- (14:19) INST – Sebastian Lopez 46-yard field goal (Drive: 10 plays, 43 yards, 3:39; Indiana State 10–3)
- (9:27) SDST – Eli Stader 46-yard field goal (Drive: 9 plays, 32 yards, 4:46; Indiana State 10–6)

Third quarter

- (5:03) INST – Rashad Rochelle 14-yard pass from Keegan Patterson, Sebastian Lopez kick (Drive: 9 plays, 64 yards, 4:28; Indiana State 17–6)

Fourth quarter

- (8:36) SDST – Alex Bullock 27-yard pass from Luke Marble, Isaiah Garcia-Castaneda run conversion failed (Drive: 10 plays, 81 yards, 3:58; Indiana State 17–12)
- (3:06) INST – Rashad Rochelle 57-yard pass from Keegan Patterson, Sebastian Lopez kick (Drive: 2 plays, 57 yards, 0:47; Indiana State 24–12)

Statistics	INST	SDST
First downs	9	26
Total yards	228	441
Rushing yards	40	162
Passing yards	188	279
Passing: Comp–Att–Int	15-25-0	24-42-2
Time of possession	18:48	41:12

Team	Category	Player	Statistics
Indiana State	Passing	Keegan Patterson	15/25, 188 yards, 2 TD
Indiana State	Rushing	Kaden Patterson	6 carries, 34 yards
Indiana State	Receiving	Rashad Rochelle	4 receptions, 84 yards, 2 TD
South Dakota State	Passing	Luke Marble	17/29, 181 yards, TD, INT
South Dakota State	Rushing	Josiah Johnson	14 carries, 75 yards
South Dakota State	Receiving	Alex Bullock	7 receptions, 107 yards, TD

==== at No. 22 South Dakota (rivalry) ====
No. 8 South Dakota State Jackrabbits (7–2) at No. 22 South Dakota Coyotes (6–4) – Game summary

Quarter	1	2	3	4	Total
No. 8 Jackrabbits	10	7	0	0	17
No. 22 Coyotes	7	10	7	0	24

at DakotaDome, Vermillion, South Dakota

- Date: November 8
- Game time: 3:00 p.m.
- Game weather: Indoors • Temperature: 72 °F (22 °C)
- Game attendance: 9,159
- Referee: Jason Berg
- TV announcers (ESPNU): Chuckie Kempf (play-by-play) and Darius Walker (analyst)

Game information
First quarter
- (14:49) SDST – Jack Smith 75-yard run, Eli Stader kick (Drive: 1 play, 75 yards, 0:11; South Dakota State 7–0)
- (8:24) SDAK – L. J. Phillips Jr. 10-yard run, Will Leyland kick (Drive: 15 plays, 70 yards, 6:25; Tied 7–7)
- (4:30) SDST – Eli Stader 40-yard field goal (Drive: 8 plays, 53 yards, 3:54; South Dakota State 10–7)

Second quarter

- (4:14) SDAK – Will Leyland 34-yard field goal (Drive: 8 plays, 51 yards, 4:48; Tied 10–10)
- (1:03) SDAK – Larenzo Fenner 19-yard pass from Aidan Bouman, Will Leyland kick (Drive: 3 plays, 80 yards, 0:38; South Dakota 17–10)
- (0:05) SDST – Alex Bullock 27-yard pass from Jack Henry, Eli Stader kick (Drive: 7 plays, 70 yards, 0:52; Tied 17–17)

Third quarter

- (11:24) SDAK – L.J. Phillips Jr. 32-yard run, Will Leyland kick (Drive: 7 plays, 75 yards, 3:26; South Dakota 24–17)

Fourth quarter

- No scoring plays

Statistics	SDST	SDAK
First downs	16	20
Total yards	330	333
Rushing yards	191	175
Passing yards	139	158
Passing: Comp–Att–Int	13–24–1	14–21–0
Time of possession	27:24	32:36

Team	Category	Player	Statistics
South Dakota State	Passing	Jack Henry	13/24, 139 yards, TD, INT
South Dakota State	Rushing	Jack Smith	3 carries, 82 yards, TD
South Dakota State	Receiving	Jack Smith	6 receptions, 61 yards
South Dakota	Passing	Aidan Bouman	14/21, 158 yards, TD
South Dakota	Rushing	L. J. Phillips Jr.	27 carries, 168 yards, 2 TD
South Dakota	Receiving	Larenzo Fenner	4 receptions, 68 yards, TD

==== No. 14 Illinois State ====
No. 14 Illinois State Redbirds (7–3) vs. No. 16 South Dakota State Jackrabbits (7–3) – Game summary

Quarter	1	2	3	4	Total
No. 14 Redbirds	28	7	0	0	35
No. 16 Jackrabbits	0	13	0	8	21

at Dana J. Dykhouse Stadium, Brookings, SD

- Date: November 15
- Game time: 2:00 p.m.
- Game weather: Sunny • Temperature: 52 °F (11 °C) • Wind: N at 10 miles per hour (16 km/h)
- Game attendance: 11,407
- Referee: Grant Henderson
- TV announcers (ESPN+): Tyler Merriam (play-by-play) and Mason Lieseth (analyst)

Game information
First quarter
- (13:05) ILST – Daniel Sobkowicz 10-yard pass from Tommy Rittenhouse, Matt Maldonado kick (Drive: 8 plays, 62 yards, 1:46; Illinois State 7–0)
- (12:03) ILST – Patrick Bauer 5-yard interception return, Matt Maldonado kick (Illinois State 14–0)
- (10:29) ILST – Daniel Sobkowicz 2-yard pass from Tommy Rittenhouse, Matt Maldonado kick (Drive: 5 plays, 28 yards, 1:33; Illinois State 21–0)
- (6:26) ILST – Tommy Rittenhouse 2-yard run, Matt Maldonado kick (Drive: 7 plays, 25 yards, 2:37; Illinois State 28–0)

Second quarter

- (10:15) ILST – Daniel Sobkowicz 9-yard pass from Tommy Rittenhouse, Matt Maldonado kick (Drive: 9 plays, 63 yards, 3:49; Illinois State 35–0)
- (5:03) SDST – Jack Henry 14-yard run, Eli Stader kick (Drive: 10 plays, 75 yards, 5:12; Illinois State 35–7)
- (0:25) SDST – Brayden Delahoyde 4-yard pass from Jack Henry, Jack Henry conversion pass failed (Drive: 15 plays, 96 yards, 2:00; Illinois State 35–13)

Third quarter

- No scoring plays

Fourth quarter

- (14:37) SDST – Josiah Johnson 2-yard run, Jack Henry pass to Greyton for two-point conversion (Drive: 16 plays, 80 yards, 6:01; Illinois State 35–21)

Statistics	ILST	SDST
First downs	20	22
Total yards	275	320
Rushing yards	134	66
Passing yards	141	254
Passing: Comp–Att–Int	17–33–0	32–51–2
Time of possession	28:56	31:04

Team	Category	Player	Statistics
Illinois State	Passing	Tommy Rittenhouse	17/32, 141 yards, 3 TD
Illinois State	Rushing	Victor Dawson	20 carries, 98 yards
Illinois State	Receiving	Daniel Sobkowicz	5 receptions, 55 yards, 3 TD
South Dakota State	Passing	Jack Henry	32/51, 254 yards, TD, 2 INT
South Dakota State	Rushing	Jack Henry	18 carries, 41 yards, TD
South Dakota State	Receiving	Alex Bullock	9 receptions, 68 yards

==== at No. 13 North Dakota ====
No. 22 South Dakota State Jackrabbits (7–4) at No. 13 North Dakota Fighting Hawks (7–4) – Game summary

Quarter	1	2	3	4	OT	Total
No. 22 Jackrabbits	0	7	14	7	6	34
No. 13 Fighting Hawks	14	3	3	8	3	31

at Alerus Center, Grand Forks, ND

- Date: November 22
- Game time: 1:00 p.m.
- Game weather: Indoors • Temperature: 72 °F (22 °C)
- Game attendance: 11,396
- Referee: David Hergert
- TV: ESPN+

Game information
First quarter
- (2:59) UND – Jerry Kaminski 14-yard run, Kenten Laughman kick (Drive: 8 plays, 98 yards, 3:53; North Dakota 7–0)
- (1:10) UND – B.J. Fleming 89-yard pass from Jerry Kaminski, Kenten Laughman kick (Drive: 1 play, 89 yards, 0:10; North Dakota 14–0)

Second quarter

- (6:21) SDST – Josiah Johnson 8-yard run, Eli Stader kick (Drive: 17 plays, 80 yards, 9:47; North Dakota 14–7)
- (0:59) UND – Kenten Laughman 20-yard field goal (Drive: 9 plays, 40 yards, 2:34; North Dakota 17–7)

Third quarter

- (3:54) UND – Kenten Laughman 29-yard field goal (Drive: 7 plays, 29 yards, 2:52; North Dakota 20–7)
- (1:19) SDST – Greyton Gannon 42-yard pass from Jack Henry, Eli Stader kick (Drive: 6 plays, 65 yards, 2:35; North Dakota 20–14)
- (0:35) SDST – Josiah Johnson 6-yard run, Eli Stader kick (Drive: 6 plays, 64 yards, 3:38; South Dakota State 21–20)

Fourth quarter

- (6:30) Josiah Johnson 1-yard run, Eli Stader kick (Drive: 6 plays, 64 yards, 3:38; South Dakota State 28–20)
- (1:52) UND – Nate DeMontagnac 16-yard pass from Jerry Kaminski, Jerry Kaminski pass to Sawyer Seidl for 2-point conversion (Drive: 11 plays, 85 yards, 4:31; Tied 28–28)

Overtime

- UND – Kenten Laughman 40-yard field goal (Drive: 4 plays, 2 yards; North Dakota 31–28)
- SDST – Grahm Goering 23-yard pass from Jack Henry (Drive: 3 plays, 25 yards; South Dakota State 34–31)

Statistics	SDST	UND
First downs	19	18
Total yards	334	367
Rushing yards	202	75
Passing yards	132	292
Passing: Comp–Att–Int	6–17–2	20–33–1
Time of possession	35:57	24:03

Team	Category	Player	Statistics
South Dakota State	Passing	Jack Henry	6/17, 132 yards, 2 TD, 2 INT
South Dakota State	Rushing	Julius Loughridge	24 carries, 112 yards
South Dakota State	Receiving	Alex Bullock	2 receptions, 58 yards
North Dakota	Passing	Jerry Kaminski	20/33, 292 yards, 2 TD, INT
North Dakota	Rushing	Jerry Kaminski	14 carries, 34 yards, TD
North Dakota	Receiving	B.J. Fleming	4 receptions, 123 yards, TD

=== NCAA Division I playoffs ===
==== No. 22 New Hampshire (NCAA Division I Playoffs – First round) ====
2025 NCAA Division I FCS Playoffs First Round
No. 22 New Hampshire Wildcats (8–4) vs. No. 16 South Dakota State Jackrabbits (8–4) – Game summary

Quarter	1	2	3	4	Total
No. 22 Wildcats	0	3	0	0	3
No. 16 Jackrabbits	14	13	0	14	41

at Dana J. Dykhouse Stadium, Brookings, SD

- Date: November 29
- Game time: 12:00 p.m.
- Game weather: Snow • Temperature: 20 °F (−7 °C) • Wind: NE at 10 miles per hour (16 km/h)
- Game attendance: 3,843
- Referee: Matt Beck
- TV: ESPN+

Game information
First quarter
- (11:10) SDST – Julius Loughridge 1-yard run, Eli Stader kick (Drive: 9 plays, 75 yards, 3:50; South Dakota State 7–0)
- (1:04) SDST – Josiah Johnson 1-yard run, Eli Stader kick (Drive: 13 plays, 88 yards, 7:44; South Dakota State 14–0)

Second quarter

- (11:26) SDST – Alex Bullock 7-yard pass from Chase Mason, Eli Stader kick (Drive: 7 plays, 68 yards, 3:21; South Dakota State 21–0)
- (2:53) UNH – Nick Reed 30-yard field goal (Drive: 15 plays, 63 yards, 8:33; South Dakota State 21–3)
- (1:51) SDST – Jack Smith 42-yard pass from Chase Mason, Max Pelham run conversion failed (Drive: 3 plays, 63 yards, 0:56; South Dakota State 27–3)

Third quarter

- No scoring plays

Fourth quarter

- (14:54) SDST – Coleman Kunts 16-yard pass from Chase Mason, Eli Stader kick (Drive: 7 plays, 30 yards, 2:47; South Dakota State 34–3)
- (3:05) SDST – Andrew Gustad 2-yard pass from Jack Henry, Eli Stader kick (Drive: 14 plays, 56 yards, 8:25; South Dakota State 41–3)

Statistics	UNH	SDST
First downs	12	23
Total yards	192	425
Rushing yards	144	193
Passing yards	48	232
Passing: Comp–Att–Int	10–23–1	17–21–1
Time of possession	28:49	31:11

Team	Category	Player	Statistics
New Hampshire	Passing	Matt Vezza	10/22, 48 yards, INT
New Hampshire	Rushing	Denzell Gibson	19 carries, 106 yards
New Hampshire	Receiving	Peyton Strickland	3 receptions, 15 yards
South Dakota State	Passing	Chase Mason	16/20, 230 yards, 3 TD, INT
South Dakota State	Rushing	Julius Loughridge	16 carries, 100 yards, TD
South Dakota State	Receiving	Grahm Goering	6 receptions, 75 yards

==== at No. 3 Montana (NCAA Division I Playoffs – Second round) ====
2025 NCAA Division I FCS Playoffs Second Round
No. 16 South Dakota State Jackrabbits (9–4) at No. 3 Montana Grizzlies (11–1) – Game summary

Quarter	1	2	3	4	Total
No. 16 Jackrabbits	14	0	0	15	29
No. 3 Grizzlies	6	16	7	21	50

at Washington–Grizzly Stadium, Missoula, MT

- Date: December 6
- Game time: 1:00 p.m.
- Game weather: Cloudy • Temperature: 37 °F (3 °C)
- Game attendance: 18,197
- Referee: John Kellermeier
- TV announcers (ESPN+): Richard Cross (play-by-play) and Jeff Woody (analyst)

Game information
First quarter
- (7:31) SDST – Grahm Goering 95-yard pass from Chase Mason, Eli Stader kick (Drive: 2 plays, 96 yards, 0:52; South Dakota State 7–0)
- (5:48) MONT – Stevie Rocker Jr. 45-yard pass from Keali'i Ah Yat, Joe Silver kick failed (Drive: 4 plays, 45 yards, 1:43; South Dakota State 7–6)
- (1:13) SDST – Chase Mason 1-yard run, Eli Stader kick (Drive: 8 plays, 65 yards, 4:29; South Dakota State 14–6)

Second quarter

- (10:38) MONT – Jo Silver 31-yard field goal (Drive: 12 plays, 74 yards, 5:31; South Dakota State 14–9)
- (5:42) MONT – Eli Gillman 5-yard run, Brooks Davis run conversion failed (Drive: 6 plays, 46 yards, 2:40; Montana 15–14)
- (0:06) MONT – Stevie Rocker Jr. 5-yard pass from Keali'i Ah Yat, Jo Silver kick (Drive: 8 plays, 59 yards, 1:07; Montana 22–14)

Third quarter

- (5:07) MONT – Drew Deck 29-yard pass from Keali'i Ah Yat, Jo Silver kick (Drive: 8 plays, 80 yards, 3:56; Montana 29–14)

Fourth quarter

- (13:21) MONT – Michael Wortham 28-yard pass from Keali'i Ah Yat, Jo Silver kick (Drive: 9 plays, 74 yards, 3:59; Montana 36–14)
- (10:18) SDST – Chase Mason 1-yard run, Chase Mason pass to John Pica for two-point conversion (Drive: 8 plays, 62 yards, 2:52; Montana 36–22)
- (4:54) MONT – Eli Gillman 11-yard run, Jo Silver kick (Drive: 8 plays, 43 yards, 5:23; Montana 43–22)
- (2:48) SDST – James Basinger 4-yard run, Eli Stader kick (Drive: 7 plays, 75 yards, 2:01; Montana 43–29)
- (1:20) MONT – Malae Fonoti 3-yard run, Jo Silver kick (Drive: 5 plays, 47 yards, 1:27; Montana 50–29)

Statistics	SDST	MONT
First downs	19	32
Total yards	417	552
Rushing yards	61	191
Passing yards	356	361
Passing: Comp–Att–Int	19–36–2	30–38–0
Turnovers	2	0
Time of possession	25:16	34:44

Team	Category	Player	Statistics
South Dakota State	Passing	Chase Mason	19/36, 356 yards, TD, 2 INT
South Dakota State	Rushing	Josiah Johnson	10 carries, 44 yards
South Dakota State	Receiving	Grahm Goering	4 receptions, 137 yards, TD
Montana	Passing	Keali'i Ah Yat	29/37, 360 yards, 4 TD
Montana	Rushing	Eli Gillman	24 carries, 135 yards, 2 TD
Montana	Receiving	Michael Wortham	8 receptions, 113 yards, TD

== Ranking movements ==
Ranking movements Legend: ██ Increase in ranking ██ Decrease in ranking т = Tied with team above or below ( ) = First-place votes
	Week														
Poll	Pre	1	2	3	4	5	6	7	8	9	10	11	12	13	Final
STATS FCS	3	2 (2)	2 (7)	2 (4)	2 (4)	2 (4)	2 (1)	2 (1)	2 (1)	4т	8	16	22	16	13
Coaches	3	2	2 (2)	2 (1)	2 (1)	2 (1)	2	2	2	5	9	15	22	18	14

== Roster ==
2025 South Dakota State Jackrabbits football team roster
Players
Coaches
Offense

Pos.	#	Name	Class
QB	5	Jon Bell	Sr
QB	16	Jack Henry	Fr
QB	13	Luke Marble	Fr
QB	7	Chase Mason	Sr
QB		Preston Otter	Fr
QB	17	Jack Thue	Fr
RB	32	James Basinger	Fr
RB	24	Brenden Begeman	So
RB	29	Corey Blair Jr.	Fr
RB	34	Josiah Johnson	Fr
RB	15	Julius Loughridge	Sr
RB	44	Joshua Myers	Fr
RB	35	Quinton Renfro	Fr
TE	4	David Alpers	Jr
TE	87	Ben Brooks	Fr
TE	10	Brayden Delahoyde	Fr
TE	89	Sebastyen Fries	Fr
TE	88	Greyton Gannon	Jr
TE	43	Andrew Gustad	Jr
TE	46	Shane Henderson	Fr
TE	82	Coleman Kuntz	Sr
TE	46	Evan McCarty	Fr
TE	83	John Pica	Jr
TE	49	Jozef Reisz	Fr
TE	33	Jalyn Thompson	So
OL	73	Nate Adams	Sr
OL	62	Kenyon Big Bow	So
OL	69	Quinten Christensen	Jr
OL	64	Thomas Dwyer	Fr
OL	78	Micah Hach	Fr
OL	76	Sam Hagen	Sr
OL	53	Caden Hotz	Fr
OL	58	Jackson Kerstin	So
OL	67	Ian Mutchler	So
OL	66	Brock Osbahr	Fr
OL	77	William Paepke	So
OL	63	Kyan Rauk	Fr
OL	70	Lincoln Semchenko	Fr
OL	74	J.B. Walters	Fr
OL	54	Shane Willenbring	Fr
WR	84	Alex Bullock	GS
WR	8	Sammy Dresie	Fr
WR	0	Landon Dulaney	Fr
WR	6	Elijah Ervin	Sr
WR	2	Isaiah Garcia-Castaneda	GS
WR	12	Grahm Goering	Sr
WR	23	Joe Kolega	Fr
WR	18	Ky Oday Jr.	Jr
WR	1	Lofton O'Groske	So
WR	14	Reese Osgood	Jr
WR	85	Joe Roll	So
WR	19	Jack Smith	Fr
WR	80	Zac Van Meeteren	Fr
WR	11	Luke Womack	Fr

Defense

Pos.	#	Name	Class
LB	39	Beau Bakken	Fr
LB	17	Ernest Blackshire Jr.	Jr
LB	20	Graham Eben	Fr
LB	47	Kytan Fyfe	Jr
LB	9	Matt Goehring	Jr
LB	33	Bryce Johnson	Jr
LB	42	Brady Kurt	Fr
LB	44	Casey Larson	Fr
LB	5	Cullen McShane	Jr
LB	48	Jack Nash	Fr
LB	11	Joe Ollman	Jr
LB	4	Andrew Price	Fr
LB	45	Boden Schiller	Fr
LB	28	Chase Van Tol	So
LB	41	Spencer Wientjes	Fr
DE	90	Daniel Bradley	Fr
DE	8	Reis Kirschenman	So
DE	49	Luke Krempges	Fr
DE	46	Maverick LeBrun	Fr
DE	97	Blake Leiferman	Fr
DE	99	Dawson Ripperda	Jr
DE	40	Liam Shaw	Fr
DE	92	Sam Watts	Fr
DE	50	Nick Wells	Fr
DT	95	Mason Brosseau	Sr
DT	57	Samuel Christensen	Fr
DT	94	Kobe Clayborne	Sr
DT	51	Logan Green	Jr
DT	71	Reggie Kloehn	Fr
DT	98	Mac Muller	Fr
DT	96	Rhett Schaefer	Fr
DT	91	Jace Sifore	Jr
DT	55	Aaron Wolfcale-Holsten	Sr
CB	37	Austin Bradley	Fr
CB	30	Cody Cotton	Jr
CB	13	Aydan Dautermann	Sr
CB	21	Myles Green	Fr
CB	22	Jamari Holliman	So
CB	36	Justin Kabera	Fr
CB	16	Noah St-Juste	So
CB	2	Myles Taylor	Sr
S	35	Finn Benz	Fr
S	25	Koby Bretz	Sr
S	43	Cam Cribari	Fr
S	3	Dontay Johnson	Jr
S	6	Jalen B. Lee	Jr
S	38	Max Stanard	Fr
S	12	Jason Thome	Jr
S	27	Noah Thompson	Jr
S	31	Carter York	Fr
DL	93	Kevin Spelman	Sr
DL	52	Brody Targgart	Jr
DB	0	Isaiah Johnson	Sr
DB	1	Jayden Oliver	GS
DB	34	Jackson Powers	So

Special teams

Pos.	#	Name	Class
PK	48	Krayton Bergstrom	Fr
PK	40	Kevin Carrigan Jr.	Jr
PK	99	Anthony Erickson	So
PK	81	Ryan Harrington	Fr
PK	26	Eli Strader	GS
P	41	Max Pelham	Sr
LS	37	Kaydon Olivia	Sr
LS	59	Carson Strohbeen	So

Head coach

- Dan Jackson (1st year)

Coordinators/assistant coaches

- Eric Eidsness – Offensive coordinator/quarterbacks
- Brian Bergstrom – Defensive coordinator/safeties
- Isaiah Jackson – Special teams coordinator
- Mike Bangtson – Offensive line
- Vince Benedetto – Tight ends
- Luke Bengtson – Wide receivers
- Zane Busekist – Linebackers
- Deontae Cooper – Running backs/recruiting coordinator
- Logan McCormick – Defensive line
- Marcus McLin – Cornerbacks
- Nathan Morris &nbdash; Director of Football Performance
- Ethan Beisner – Director of Football Operations

Legend

- (C) Team captain
- (S) Suspended
- (I) Ineligible
- Injured
- Redshirt

Roster
