= 2026 South Dakota State Jackrabbits football team =

American college football season

2026 South Dakota State Jackrabbits football

MVFC Champion

FCS Playoffs
- Conference: Missouri Valley Football Conference

Ranking
- STATS: No. 3
- FCS Coaches: No. 3
- Record: 10–2 (7–1 MVFC)
- Head coach: Dan Jackson (2nd season)
- Offensive coordinator: Eric Eidsness (15th season)
- Offensive scheme: Spread
- Defensive coordinator: Brian Bergstrom (5th season)
- Base defense: 4–3
- Home stadium: Dana J. Dykhouse Stadium

2026 Missouri Valley Football Conference standings
	Conf.			Overall
Team	W		L	W		L
No. 3 South Dakota State $^	7	–	1	10	–	2
No. 6 Youngstown State ^	6	–	2	8	–	3
No. 7 South Dakota ^	6	–	2	9	–	3
No. 10 North Dakota ^	5	–	3	8	–	4
No. 11 Illinois State ^	4	–	4	8	–	4
Southern Illinois	3	–	5	5	–	7
Northern Iowa	3	–	5	4	–	7
Murray State	2	–	6	3	–	9
Indiana State	0	–	8	2	–	10
$ – Conference champion; ^ – FCS playoff participant; As of November 22, 2026; Rankings from STATS Poll

The 2026 South Dakota State Jackrabbits football team represents South Dakota State University during the 2026 NCAA Division I FCS football season, as a member of the Missouri Valley Football Conference (MVFC). They are led by second-year head coach Dan Jackson, and play home games at Dana J. Dykhouse Stadium in Brookings, South Dakota.

== Preseason ==
=== MVFC poll ===
The Missouri Valley Football Conference released its preseason poll on July 14, 2026, voted on by league athletic directors, coaches, and media members. The Jackrabbits were predicted to finish first in the conference.

== Schedule ==
Date	Time	Opponent	Rank	Site	TV	Result	Attendance
August 29	6:00 p.m.	Stetson*	No. 3	Dana J. Dykhouse Stadium; Brookings, SD	ESPN+	W 70–7	19,192
September 5	7:00 p.m.	at Northwestern*	No. 2	Martin Stadium; Evanston, IL	BTN	L 18–34	9,574
September 12	6:00 p.m.	New Haven*	No. 2	Dana J. Dykhouse Stadium; Brookings, SD	ESPN+	W 57–14	19,013
September 19	6:00 p.m.	No. 9 Youngstown State	No. 2	Dana J. Dykhouse Stadium; Brookings, SD	ESPN+	W 27–20	18,541
September 26	6:00 p.m.	Eastern Illinois*	No. 2	Dana J. Dykhouse Stadium; Brookings, SD	ESPN+	W 42–7	18,264
October 3	6:00 p.m.	at No. 10 Illinois State	No. 2	Hancock Stadium; Normal, IL	ESPN+	W 31–14	10,171
October 17	1:00 p.m.	at No. 11 North Dakota	No. 1	Alerus Center; Grand Forks, ND	ESPN+	L 10–21	12,922
October 24	2:00 p.m.	Murray State^{†}	No. 5	Dana J. Dykhouse Stadium; Brookings, SD	ESPN+	W 42–9	19,302
October 31	3:00 p.m.	No. 6 South Dakota	No. 5	Dana J. Dykhouse Stadium; Brookings, SD (rivalry)	ESPNU	W 31–21	18,902
November 7	1:00 p.m.	at Northern Iowa	No. 5	UNI-Dome; Cedar Falls, IA	ESPN+	W 41–15	10,037
November 14	1:00 p.m.	at Southern Illinois	No. 4	Saluki Stadium; Carbondale, IL	ESPN+	W 52–16	5,968
November 21	2:00 p.m.	Indiana State	No. 3	Dana J. Dykhouse Stadium; Brookings, SD	ESPN+	W 52–13	12,148
*Non-conference game; ^{†}Homecoming; Rankings from STATS Poll released prior to the game; All times are in Central time; Source:

== Rankings ==
Ranking movements Legend: ██ Increase in ranking ██ Decrease in ranking ( ) = First-place votes
	Week														
Poll	Pre	1	2	3	4	5	6	7	8	9	10	11	12	13	Final
STATS	3	2	2	2	2 (10)	2 (9)	1 (52)	1 (52)	5	5	5 (1)	4 (1)	3 (6)		
Coaches	3 (1)	2	3 (1)	3	2	2	1 (24)	1 (23)	5	5	5	4	3		

== Game summaries ==
All times Central

=== Stetson ===
Stetson Hatters (0–0) at No. 3 South Dakota State Jackrabbits (0–0) – Game summary

Quarter	1	2	3	4	Total
Hatters	0	0	7	0	7
No. 3 Jackrabbits	21	21	28	0	70

at Dana J. Dykhouse Stadium • Brookings, SD

- Date: August 29, 2026
- Game time: 6:00 PM
- Game weather: Clear • Temperature: 83 °F (28 °C) • Wind: N at 5 miles per hour (8.0 km/h)
- Game attendance: 19,192
- Referee: Carl Chapman
- TV announcers (ESPN+): Tyler Merriam and Kurtiss Riggs

Game information

First quarter

- SDST – Jack Smith 73-yard pass from Chase Mason (Tristan Alvano kick), 13:32. Jackrabbits 7–0. Drive: 1 play, 73 yards, 0:10.
- SDST – Corey Blair Jr. 10-yard run (Tristan Alvano kick), 12:04. Jackrabbits 14–0. Drive: 4 plays, 27 yards, 1:20.
- SDST – Josiah Johnson 20-yard run (Tristan Alvano kick), 0:28. Jackrabbits 21–0. Drive: 5 plays, 53 yards, 2:34.

Second quarter

- SDST – Alex Uchtman 65-yard punt return (Tristan Alvano kick), 13:30. Jackrabbits 28–0.
- SDST – Josiah Johnson 6-yard run (Tristan Alvano kick), 12:34. Jackrabbits 35–0. Drive: 2 plays, 8 yards, 0:44.
- SDST – Ramon McKinney Jr. 27-yard run (Tristan Alvano kick), 2:16. Jackrabbits 42–0. Drive: 11 plays, 92 yards, 5:24.

Third quarter

- SDST – Corey Blair Jr. 52-yard run (Tristan Alvano kick), 14:42. Jackrabbits 49–0. Drive: 1 play, 52 yards, 0:10.
- SDST – Landon Dulaney 78-yard pass from Josh Holst (Tristan Alvano kick), 13:29. Jackrabbits 56–0. Drive: 1 play, 78 yards, 0:12.
- SDST – James Basinger 6-yard run (Tristan Alvano kick), 8:22. Jackrabbits 63–0. Drive: 5 plays, 69 yards, 2:59.
- STET – Chris Stephenson 3-yard run (Paul DeSousa kick), 3:37. Jackrabbits 63–7. Drive: 8 plays, 75 yards, 4:45.
- SDST – Josh Myers 27-yard run (Tristan Alvano kick), 0:15. Jackrabbits 70–7. Drive: 5 plays, 70 yards, 3:18.

Fourth quarter

- No scoring plays.

Statistics	STET	SDST
First downs	15	25
Plays–yards	66–265	56–628
Rushes–yards	34–108	45–393
Passing yards	157	235
Passing: comp–att–int	21–32–0	6–11–0
Turnovers	2	0
Time of possession	30:34	29:26

Team	Category	Player	Statistics
Stetson	Passing	Thomas von Grote	17/26, 95 yards
Stetson	Rushing	Chris Stephenson	13 carries, 69 yards, TD
Stetson	Receiving	Malachi Townsend	5 receptions, 44 yards
South Dakota State	Passing	Chase Mason	5/10, 157 yards, TD
South Dakota State	Rushing	James Basinger	8 carries, 110 yards, TD
South Dakota State	Receiving	Landon Dulaney	2 receptions, 89 yards, TD

=== at Northwestern (FBS) ===
No. 2 South Dakota State Jackrabbits (1–0) at Northwestern Wildcats (FBS) (0–0) – Game summary

Quarter	1	2	3	4	Total
No. 2 Jackrabbits	0	6	6	6	18
Wildcats (FBS)	7	3	7	17	34

at Martin Stadium • Evanston, IL

- Date: September 5, 2026
- Game time: 7:00 p.m.
- Game weather: Cloudy • Temperature: 73 °F (23 °C) • Wind: NE at 14 miles per hour (23 km/h)
- Game attendance: 9,574
- Referee: Tim O'Dey
- TV announcers (BTN): Lisa Byington, Tanner Morgan and Natalie Kerwin

Game information

First quarter

- NU – Alex Honig 11-yard pass from Aidan Chiles (Jackson Kleather kick), 11:42. Wildcats 7–0. Drive: 2 plays, 82 yards, 0:44.

Second quarter

- SDST – Tristan Alvano 21-yard field goal, 10:50. Wildcats 7–3. Drive: 12 plays, 77 yards, 6:12.
- NU – Jackson Kleather 36-yard field goal, 6:32. Wildcats 10–3. Drive: 9 plays, 56 yards, 4:18.
- SDST – Tristan Alvano 33-yard field goal, 1:16. Wildcats 10–6. Drive: 7 plays, 36 yards, 2:32.

Third quarter

- SDST – Tristan Alvano 27-yard field goal, 9:56. Wildcats 10–9. Drive: 7 plays, 17 yards, 3:23.
- NU – Caleb Komolafe 7-yard run (Jackson Kleather kick), 7:13. Wildcats 17–9. Drive: 6 plays, 75 yards, 2:43.
- SDST – Tristan Alvano 26-yard field goal, 2:16. Wildcats 17–12. Drive: 13 plays, 69 yards, 4:51.

Fourth quarter

- NU – Jackson Kleather 38-yard field goal, 13:32. Wildcats 20–12. Drive: 8 plays, 55 yards, 3:44.
- SDST – Josiah Johnson 2-yard run (pass failed), 8:16. Wildcats 20–18. Drive: 9 plays, 75 yards, 5:16.
- NU – Aidan Chiles 14-yard run (Jackson Kleather kick), 4:34. Wildcats 27–18. Drive: 9 plays, 71 yards, 3:37.
- NU – Joseph Himon II 80-yard run (Jackson Kleather kick), 1:15. Wildcats 34–18. Drive: 1 play, 80 yards, 0:12.

Statistics	SDST	NU
First downs	27	19
Plays–yards	88–432	55–497
Rushes–yards	40–147	31–224
Passing yards	285	273
Passing: comp–att–int	23–48–1	14–24–0
Turnovers	1	0
Time of possession	34:08	25:52

Team	Category	Player	Statistics
South Dakota State	Passing	Chase Mason	23/48, 285 yards, INT
South Dakota State	Rushing	Josiah Johnson	19 carries, 79 yards, TD
South Dakota State	Receiving	Grahm Goering	9 receptions, 117 yards
Northwestern	Passing	Aidan Chiles	14/24, 273 yards, TD
Northwestern	Rushing	Joseph Himon II	4 carries, 87 yards, TD
Northwestern	Receiving	Griffin Wilde	3 receptions, 104 yards

=== New Haven ===
New Haven Chargers (1–1) at No. 2 South Dakota State Jackrabbits (1–1) – Game summary

Quarter	1	2	3	4	Total
Chargers	0	0	0	14	14
No. 2 Jackrabbits	3	33	14	7	57

at Dana J. Dykhouse Stadium • Brookings, SD

- Date: September 12, 2026
- Game time: 6:00 PM
- Game weather: Clear • Temperature: 69 °F (21 °C) • Wind: N at 10 miles per hour (16 km/h)
- Game attendance: 19,013
- Referee: Gregory Gompf
- TV announcers (ESPN+): Tyler Merriam (play-by-play), Kurtiss Riggs (analyst) and Kelsey Dennehy (sideline)

Game information

First quarter

- (8:42) SDST – Tristan Alvano 31-yard field goal (Drive: 15 plays, 67 yards, 6:12; South Dakota State 3–0)

Second quarter

- (13:30) SDST – Chase Mason 1-yard run, Tristan Alvano kick (Drive: 14 plays, 66 yards, 6:04; South Dakota State 10–0)
- (6:17) SDST – Ramon McKinney Jr. 22-yard run, Tristan Alvano kick (Drive: 9 plays, 99 yards, 4:35; South Dakota State 17–0)
- (4:16) SDST – Carter Sitzman 0-yard safety (South Dakota State 19–0)
- (1:56) SDST – Tristan Alvano 36-yard field goal (Drive: 5 plays, 50 yards, 2:16; South Dakota State 22–0)
- (1:39) SDST – Coleman Kuntz 25-yard pass from Chase Mason, Tristan Alvano kick (Drive: 1 play, 25 yards, 0:05; South Dakota State 29–0)
- (0:50) SDST – Greyton Gannon 24-yard pass from Chase Mason, Tristan Alvano kick (Drive: 3 plays, 55 yards, 0:20; South Dakota State 36–0)

Third quarter

- (12:46) SDST – Greyton Gannon 29-yard pass from Chase Mason, Tristan Alvano kick (Drive: 3 plays, 43 yards, 1:16; South Dakota State 43–0)
- (12:31) SDST – James Basinger 27-yard run, Tristan Alvano kick (Drive: 1 play, 27 yards, 0:09; South Dakota State 50–0)

Fourth quarter

- (13:26) SDST – James Basinger 55-yard run, Tristan Alvano kick (Drive: 2 plays, 59 yards, 0:48; South Dakota State 57–0)
- (10:32) NH – Lasalle Rose Jr. 19-yard pass from Jake Tripptree, Liam Quigley kick (Drive: 3 plays, 15 yards, 0:44; South Dakota State 57–7)
- (5:08) NH – Jason Champagne 49-yard run, Liam Quigley kick (Drive: 5 plays, 80 yards, 2:26; South Dakota State 57–14)

Statistics	NH	SDST
First downs	10	24
Plays–yards	59–236	68–512
Rushes–yards	34–150	46–256
Passing yards	86	256
Passing: comp–att–int	9–25–0	13–22–0
Turnovers	2	1
Time of possession	26:17	33:43

Team	Category	Player	Statistics
New Haven	Passing	AJ Duffy	6/20, 48 yards
New Haven	Rushing	Zaon Laney	15 carries, 54 yards
New Haven	Receiving	Issac Glaudin	3 receptions, 27 yards
South Dakota State	Passing	Chase Mason	12/28, 255 yards, 3 TD
South Dakota State	Rushing	James Basinger	6 carries, 88 yards, 2 TD
South Dakota State	Receiving	Grahm Goering	2 receptions, 77 yards

=== No. 9 Youngstown State ===
No. 9 Youngstown State Penguins (2–1) at No. 2 South Dakota State Jackrabbits (2–1) – Game summary

Quarter	1	2	3	4	Total
No. 9 Penguins	0	10	7	3	20
No. 2 Jackrabbits	7	10	10	0	27

at Dana J. Dykhouse Stadium • Brookings, SD

- Date: September 19, 2026
- Game time: 6:00 PM
- Game weather: Cloudy • Temperature: 60 °F (16 °C) • Wind: NE at 8 miles per hour (13 km/h)
- Game attendance: 18,541
- Referee: Jason Perkins
- TV announcers (ESPN+): Tyler Merriam (play-by-play) and Kurtiss Riggs (analyst)

Game information

First quarter

- (8:50) SDST – Josiah Johnson 4-yard run, Tristan Alvano kick (Drive: 11 plays, 84 yards, 6:05; South Dakota State 7–0)

Second quarter

- (10:23) YSU – Andrew Lastovka 39-yard field goal (Drive: 12 plays, 59 yards, 5:44; South Dakota State 7–3)
- (3:35) YSU – Alex McDonald 11-yard pass from Beau Brungard, Andrew Lastovka kick (Drive: 9 plays, 94 yards, 4:36; Youngstown State 10–7)
- (0:53) SDST – Chase Mason 18-yard run, Tristan Alvano kick (Drive: 7 plays, 71 yards, 2:41; South Dakota State 14–10)
- (0:10) SDST – Tristan Alvano 27-yard field goal (Drive: 5 plays, 17 yards, 0:35; South Dakota State 17–10)

Third quarter

- (7:55) SDST – Josiah Johnson 16-yard run, Tristan Alvano kick (Drive: 8 plays, 80 yards, 4:14; South Dakota State 24–10)
- (0:00) SDST – Tristan Alvano 43-yard field goal (Drive: 10 plays, 50 yards, 4:32; South Dakota State 27–17)

Fourth quarter

- (1:56) Andrew Lastovka 34-yard field goal (Drive: 5 plays, 53 yards, 2:02; South Dakota State 27–20)

Statistics	YSU	SDST
First downs	20	26
Plays–yards	58–349	66–461
Rushes–yards	23–57	45–308
Passing yards	292	153
Passing: comp–att–int	27–35–1	12–21–0
Turnovers	1	1
Time of possession	28:38	31:22

Team	Category	Player	Statistics
Youngstown State	Passing	Beau Brungard	27/35, 292 yards, 2 TD, INT
Youngstown State	Rushing	Beau Brungard	13 carries, 32 yards
Youngstown State	Receiving	Lynn Wyche-El	7 receptions, 114 yards, TD
South Dakota State	Passing	Chase Mason	9/13, 137 yards
South Dakota State	Rushing	Josiah Johnson	30 carries, 238 yards, 2 TD
South Dakota State	Receiving	Lofton O'Groske	7 receptions, 94 yards

=== Eastern Illinois ===
Eastern Illinois Panthers (1–3) at No. 2 South Dakota State Jackrabbits (3–1) – Game summary

Quarter	1	2	3	4	Total
Panthers	0	7	0	0	7
No. 2 Jackrabbits	7	7	21	7	42

at Dana J. Dykhouse Stadium • Brookings, SD

- Date: September 26, 2026
- Game time: 6:00 PM
- Game weather: Cloudy • Temperature: 65 °F (18 °C) • Wind: S at 10 miles per hour (16 km/h)
- Game attendance: 18,264
- Referee: Grand Henderson
- TV: ESPN+

Game information

First quarter

- (11:56) SDST – Josiah Johnson 18-yard run, Tristan Alvano kick (Drive: 6 plays, 75 yards, 3:04; South Dakota State 7–0)

Second quarter

- (12:11) EIU – Cole LaCrue 9-yard run, Drew Schiller kick (Drive: 12 plays, 82 yards, 6:23; Tied 7–7)
- (8:29) SDST – James Basinger 39-yard run, Tristan Alvano kick (Drive: 8 plays, 75 yards, 3:42; South Dakota State 14–7)

Third quarter

- (11:58) SDST – James Basinger 48-yard run, Tristan Alvano kick (Drive: 1 play, 48 yards, 0:09; South Dakota State 21–7)
- (10:31) SDST – Corey Blair 61-yard run, Tristan Alvano kick (Drive: 1 play, 61 yards, 0:06; South Dakota State 28–7)
- (1:30) SDST – Josiah Johnson 55-yard run, Tristan Alvano kick (Drive: 5 plays, 90 yards, 3:35; South Dakota State 35–7)

Fourth quarter

- (10:33) SDST – Ben Brooks 16-yard pass from Josh Holst, Tristan Alvano kick (Drive: 7 plays, 39 yards, 3:01; South Dakota State 42–7)

Statistics	EIU	SDST
First downs	10	26
Plays–yards	57–196	69–597
Rushes–yards	36–73	45–408
Passing yards	123	189
Passing: comp–att–int	10–21–0	12–24–1
Turnovers	2	1
Time of possession	27:56	32:04

Team	Category	Player	Statistics
Eastern Illinois	Passing	Cole LaCrue	6/16, 85 yards
Eastern Illinois	Rushing	Charles Kellom	11 carries, 28 yards
Eastern Illinois	Receiving	Samuel Gonzalez	1 reception, 37 yards
South Dakota State	Passing	Josh Holst	11/22, 176 yards, TD
South Dakota State	Rushing	Josiah Johnson	14 carries, 121 yards, 2 TD
South Dakota State	Receiving	Coleman Kuntz	4 receptions, 81 yards

=== at No. 10 Illinois State ===
No. 2 South Dakota State Jackrabbits (4–1) at No. 10 Illinois State Redbirds (4–1) – Game summary

Quarter	1	2	Total
No. 2 Jackrabbits			0
No. 10 Redbirds			0

at Hancock Stadium • Normal, IL

- Date: October 3, 2026
- Game time: 6:00 p.m.
- TV: ESPN+

Game information

First quarter
Second quarter
Third quarter
Fourth quarter

Statistics	SDST	ILST
First downs		
Plays–yards		
Rushes–yards		
Passing yards		
Passing: comp–att–int		
Turnovers		
Time of possession		

Team	Category	Player	Statistics
South Dakota State	Passing		
South Dakota State	Rushing		
South Dakota State	Receiving		
Illinois State	Passing		
Illinois State	Rushing		
Illinois State	Receiving		

=== at No. 11 North Dakota ===
No. 1 South Dakota State Jackrabbits (5–1) at No. 11 North Dakota Fighting Hawks (5–2) – Game summary

Quarter	1	2	Total
No. 1 Jackrabbits			0
No. 11 Fighting Hawks			0

at Alerus Center • Grand Forks, ND

- Date: October 17, 2026
- Game time: 1:00 PM
- Game weather: Indoors; 70 °F (21 °C)
- TV: ESPN+

Statistics	SDST	UND
First downs		
Plays–yards		
Rushes–yards		
Passing yards		
Passing: comp–att–int		
Turnovers		
Time of possession		

Team	Category	Player	Statistics
South Dakota State	Passing		
South Dakota State	Rushing		
South Dakota State	Receiving		
North Dakota	Passing		
North Dakota	Rushing		
North Dakota	Receiving		

=== Murray State ===
Murray State Racers (1–6) at No. 5 South Dakota State Jackrabbits (5–2) – Game summary

Quarter	1	2	Total
Racers			0
No. 5 Jackrabbits			0

at Dana J. Dykhouse Stadium • Brookings, SD

- Date: October 24, 2026
- Game time: 2:00 PM
- TV: ESPN+

Game information

First quarter
Second quarter
Third quarter
Fourth quarter

Statistics	MUR	SDST
First downs		
Plays–yards		
Rushes–yards		
Passing yards		
Passing: comp–att–int		
Turnovers		
Time of possession		

Team	Category	Player	Statistics
Murray State	Passing		
Murray State	Rushing		
Murray State	Receiving		
South Dakota State	Passing		
South Dakota State	Rushing		
South Dakota State	Receiving		

=== No. 6 South Dakota (rivalry) ===
No. 6 South Dakota Coyotes (7–2) at No. 5 South Dakota State Jackrabbits (6–2) – Game summary

Quarter	1	2	Total
No. 6 Coyotes			0
No. 5 Jackrabbits			0

at Dana J. Dykhouse Stadium • Brookings, SD

- Date: October 31, 2026
- Game time: 3:00 p.m.
- TV: ESPNU

Game information

First quarter
Second quarter
Third quarter
Fourth quarter

Statistics	SDAK	SDST
First downs		
Plays–yards		
Rushes–yards		
Passing yards		
Passing: comp–att–int		
Turnovers		
Time of possession		

Team	Category	Player	Statistics
South Dakota	Passing		
South Dakota	Rushing		
South Dakota	Receiving		
South Dakota State	Passing		
South Dakota State	Rushing		
South Dakota State	Receiving		

=== at Northern Iowa ===
No. 5 South Dakota State Jackrabbits (7–2) at Northern Iowa Panthers (4–4) – Game summary

Quarter	1	2	Total
No. 5 Jackrabbits			0
Panthers			0

at UNI-Dome • Cedar Falls, IA

- Date: November 7, 2026
- Game time: 1:00 p.m.
- Game weather: Indoors; 70 °F (21 °C)
- TV: ESPN+

Game information

First quarter
Second quarter
Third quarter
Fourth quarter

Statistics	SDST	UNI
First downs		
Plays–yards		
Rushes–yards		
Passing yards		
Passing: comp–att–int		
Turnovers		
Time of possession		

Team	Category	Player	Statistics
South Dakota State	Passing		
South Dakota State	Rushing		
South Dakota State	Receiving		
Northern Iowa	Passing		
Northern Iowa	Rushing		
Northern Iowa	Receiving		

=== at Southern Illinois ===
No. 4 South Dakota State Jackrabbits (8–2) at Southern Illinois Salukis (5–5) – Game summary

Quarter	1	2	Total
No. 4 Jackrabbits			0
Salukis			0

at Saluki Stadium • Carbondale, IL

- Date: November 14, 2026
- Game time: 1:00 PM
- TV: ESPN+

Game information

First quarter
Second quarter
Third quarter
Fourth quarter

Statistics	SDST	SIU
First downs		
Plays–yards		
Rushes–yards		
Passing yards		
Passing: comp–att–int		
Turnovers		
Time of possession		

Team	Category	Player	Statistics
South Dakota State	Passing		
South Dakota State	Rushing		
South Dakota State	Receiving		
Southern Illinois	Passing		
Southern Illinois	Rushing		
Southern Illinois	Receiving		

=== Indiana State ===
Indiana State Sycamores (2–9) at No. 3 South Dakota State Jackrabbits (9–2) – Game summary

Quarter	1	2	Total
Sycamores			0
No. 3 Jackrabbits			0

at Dana J. Dykhouse Stadium • Brookings, SD

- Date: November 21, 2026
- Game time: 2:00 PM
- TV: ESPN+

Game information

First quarter
Second quarter
Third quarter
Fourth quarter

Statistics	INST	SDST
First downs		
Plays–yards		
Rushes–yards		
Passing yards		
Passing: comp–att–int		
Turnovers		
Time of possession		

Team	Category	Player	Statistics
Indiana State	Passing		
Indiana State	Rushing		
Indiana State	Receiving		
South Dakota State	Passing		
South Dakota State	Rushing		
South Dakota State	Receiving		

== Personnel ==
=== Transfers ===
==== Outgoing ====
Player	Position	Destination
Isaiah Johnson	DB	Cincinnati
Jalen Lee	S	Coastal Carolina
Preston Otter	QB	Cornell
David Alpers III	TE	Jacksonville State
Luke Womack	WR	Northern Colorado
Andrew Price	LB	Northern Iowa
Jackson Powers	DB	St. Thomas
Ernest Blackshire Jr.	LB	Wagner
Quinton Renfro	RB	Washburn
Luke Marble	QB	West Georgia

==== Incoming ====
Player	Position	Previous school
Jae'Shaun Thomas	OL	Minnesota Duluth
Jack Johnson	S	Minnesota State–Moorhead
Ashton Sayre	DT	Minnesota State–Moorhead
Tristan Alvano	K	Nebraska
Ife Current	CB	Nebraska–Kearney
Ramon McKinney Jr.	RB	Northeastern State
Josh Holst	QB	Northern Illinois
Landon Tate	WR	Northern Illinois
Anthony Rezac	QB	Notre Dame
Dominic Rezac	RB	Vanderbilt
Cooper Starks	IOL	Vanderbilt
Amaje Parker	CB	VMI
Carter Sitzman	DE	Wayne State (NE)
Justin Lutz	LS	Weber State
Paul Kim	CB	Wisconsin–Whitewater
