= 2025 Sacramento State Hornets football team =

American college football season

2025 Sacramento State Hornets football
- Conference: Big Sky Conference
- Record: 7–5 (5–3 Big Sky)
- Head coach: Brennan Marion (1st season)
- Offensive coordinator: Ken Merchant (1st season)
- Co-offensive coordinator: A. C. Patterson (1st season)
- Offensive scheme: Go-Go
- Defensive coordinator: Marcus Patton (1st season)
- Co-defensive coordinator: Josh Brown (1st season)
- Base defense: 4–2–5
- Home stadium: Hornet Stadium

2025 Big Sky Conference football standings
	Conf.			Overall
Team	W		L	W		L
No. 1 Montana State $^	8	–	0	14	–	2
No. 3 Montana ^	7	–	1	13	–	2
No. 8 UC Davis ^	6	–	2	9	–	4
Sacramento State	5	–	3	7	–	5
Idaho State	5	–	3	6	–	6
Northern Arizona	4	–	4	7	–	5
Eastern Washington	4	–	4	5	–	7
Cal Poly	2	–	6	4	–	8
Idaho	2	–	6	4	–	8
Northern Colorado	2	–	6	4	–	8
Weber State	2	–	6	4	–	8
Portland State	1	–	7	1	–	11
$ – Conference champion; ^ – FCS playoff participant; Rankings from STATS Poll

The 2025 Sacramento State Hornets football team represented California State University, Sacramento during the 2025 NCAA Division I FCS football season as a member of the Big Sky Conference. They were led by Brennan Marion in his first and only season as head coach and played their home games at Hornet Stadium in Sacramento, California.

A realignment to the FBS was announced in 2025, but the NCAA Football Oversight Committee denied a recommendation ahead of a Division I Council vote. The vote later officially denied the waiver. In February 2026, it was announced that the Hornets would join the Mid-American Conference (MAC) at the FBS level as a football-only member beginning with the 2026 season.

The Sacramento State Hornets drew an average home attendance of 15,468, the 10th-highest of all NCAA Division I FCS football teams.

== Offseason ==
=== Transfers ===
==== Outgoing ====
Player	Position	Destination
Evan Kiely	K	Boise State
Jason Auzenne	WR/RB	College of San Mateo
Phoenix Rose	DB	College of San Mateo
Kyle Stahlecker	DE	Eastern Washington
Carson Conklin	QB	Fresno State
Zelmar Vedder	DB	Houston
Tommy Poe	WR	Idaho State
Davion Ross	S	Idaho State
Devin Gandy	WR	Louisiana Tech
Elijah Tau-Tolliver	RB	Michigan State
Spencer Patton	DT	Montana Tech
Murvin Kenion III	DB	Nevada
Joey Wright	OL	Nevada
Darren Burton II	DB	New Hampshire
Tyler Henry	DL	North Dakota
Jackson Lataimua	DB	North Texas
Danny Scudero	WR	San Jose State
AJ Campos	LS	San Jose State
Mason Brosseau	DT	South Dakota State
Coleman Kuntz	TE	South Dakota State
Carson Camp	QB	Southeastern Louisiana
Nathan Mejia	OL	Stanford
Jayden Davis	S	Western Michigan
Jayden Weber	WR	Unknown
Mekhei Byrd	WR	Unknown
Ezra Moleni	RB	Unknown
Jayden Flaig	TE	Unknown
Diego Davis	LB	Withdrawn

==== Incoming ====
Player	Position	Previous school
Connor McDowell	LS	Angelo State
Donovan Haslam	OL	Austin Peay
Jekob Jones	LB	Cal Poly
Jordan Herman	OL	Charlotte
Damian Henderson II	RB	Colorado State
Jordan Williams	TE	Colorado State
Malik Tullis	DL	Eastern Michigan
Melvin Swindle II	DL	Eastern Michigan
Jaden Rashada	QB	Georgia
Darren Burton II	DB	Hampton
Jayden Davis	DB	Idaho State
Chase Brackney	DL	Iowa
Jamar Curtis	RB	Lafayette
James Jones	RB	Louisiana–Monroe
Dylan Gooden	DE	Maryland
Itayvion Brown	DE	Michigan State
James Gillespie	DT	Middle Tennessee
Miles Bailey	DL	Murray State
Brodie Tagaloa	DL	Nebraska
Savion Red	RB	Nevada
Kristopher Ross	DE	Nevada
Ikaika Ragsdale	WR	North Texas
Grant Meadors	K	Oregon
Jordan Anderson	WR	Oregon State
Rodney Hammond	RB	Pittsburgh
Logan Tanner	TE	San Diego State
Dean Abdullah	TE	San Diego State
Dylan Hampsten	DE	San Jose State
Gavin Thomson	WR	Saint Francis
Mikey Henderson	WR	Tarleton State
Ernest Campbell	WR	Texas A&M
Syncere Massey	DL	Texas Southern
Deven Wright	DE	Texas State
Cardell Williams	QB	Tulsa
Ricky Lee III	DB	UAB
Agiye Hall	WR	UCF
Joseph Firebaugh Jr.	K	UCLA
Davis Ambuehl	TE	UNLV
Timothy Conerly	WR	UNLV
Brennon Scott	LB	UNLV
Damien McDaniel	WR	UNLV
Sammy Norris	FB	UNLV
Keith Conley	DL	UNLV
Bear Tenney	TE	Utah
Oscar Moore	DB	UTEP
Jace Wilson	WR	UTSA
Sam Adams II	RB	Washington
Jackson Lataimua	DB	Washington State
Warren Smith	DB	Washington State
Taison Fa’asuamanu	LB	West Liberty

=== Coaching staff additions ===
Name	New Position	Previous Team	Previous Position	Source
Brennan Marion	Head coach	UNLV	Offensive coordinator/Quarterbacks	
Kenneth Merchant	Offensive coordinator/Quarterbacks	UNLV	Offensive analyst	
AC Patterson	Co-offensive coordinator/Running backs	Portland State	Assistant head coach/Offensive coordinator/Running backs	
Marcus Patton	Defensive coordinator	Colorado State	Cornerbacks	
Josh Brown	Co-defensive coordinator/Linebackers	McNeese	Co-defensive coordinator/Safeties	
Darrin Walls	Defensive pass game coordinator/Cornerbacks	Albany	Co-defensive coordinator/Cornerbacks	
Rob Wenger	Special teams	Minnesota	Special teams/Rush ends	
Robbie Bell	Tight ends	Georgia Tech	Offensive line quality control	
Nathan Kenion	Safeties	Diablo Valley	Defensive coordinator	
Sidhart Krishnamurthi	Wide receivers	San Jose State	Offensive quality control	
Ed McGilvra	Defensive line	College of the Canyons	Defensive line	
Jake Vang	Edge rushers	Colorado State	Defensive analyst	

== Schedule ==
Date	Time	Opponent	Rank	Site	TV	Result	Attendance
August 30	4:00 p.m.	at No. 3 South Dakota State*	No. 15	Dana J. Dykhouse Stadium; Brookings, SD	ESPN+	L 3–20	19,163
September 6	2:00 p.m.	at Nevada*	No. 18	Mackay Stadium; Reno, NV	KNSN-TV	L 17–20	20,535
September 13	6:00 p.m.	Mercyhurst*	No. 21	Hornet Stadium; Sacramento, CA	ESPN+	W 49–28	12,231
September 20	6:00 p.m.	Central Arkansas*	No. 24	Hornet Stadium; Sacramento, CA	ESPN+	W 45–16	13,253
September 27	6:00 p.m.	Cal Poly	No. 21	Hornet Stadium; Sacramento, CA	ESPN+	L 24–32	15,016
October 11	5:00 p.m.	at Weber State		Stewart Stadium; Ogden, UT	ESPN+	W 55–27	2,126
October 18	6:00 p.m.	Northern Colorado		Hornet Stadium; Sacramento, CA	ESPN+	W 40–35	20,022
October 24	7:30 p.m.	No. 4 Montana		Hornet Stadium; Sacramento, CA	ESPN2	L 35–49	16,816
November 1	1:00 p.m.	at Eastern Washington		Roos Field; Cheney, WA	ESPN+	W 35–13	4,356
November 8	2:00 p.m.	at Portland State		Hillsboro Stadium; Hillsboro, OR	ESPN+	W 52–24	1,284
November 15	6:00 p.m.	Idaho		Hornet Stadium; Sacramento, CA	ESPN+	W 23–20	15,467
November 22	1:00 p.m.	at No. 15 UC Davis		UC Davis Health Stadium; Davis, CA (Causeway Classic)	ESPN+	L 27–31	14,590
*Non-conference game; Rankings from STATS Poll released prior to the game; All times are in Pacific time

== Game summaries ==
=== at No. 3 South Dakota State ===
No. 15 Sacramento State Hornets (0–0) at No. 3 South Dakota State Jackrabbits (0–0) – Game summary

Quarter	1	2	3	4	Total
No. 15 Hornets	3	0	0	0	3
No. 3 Jackrabbits	3	14	0	3	20

at Dana J. Dykhouse Stadium • Brookings, SD

- Date: August 30
- Game time: 4:00 PM PDT
- Game attendance: 19,163
- Referee: Gregory Gompf
- TV announcers (ESPN+): Tyler Merriam (play-by-play) and Kurtiss Riggs (analyst)

Game information

First quarter

- SDST – Eli Stader 22-yard field goal, 8:11. Jackrabbits 3–0. Drive: 5 plays, 43 yards, 1:52.
- SAC – Grant Meadors 36-yard field goal, 5:18. Tied 3–3. Drive: 4 plays, 5 yards, 1:52.

Second quarter

- SDST – Andrew Gustad 4-yard pass from Chase Mason (Eli Stader kick), 12:38. Jackrabbits 10–3. Drive: 15 plays, 75 yards, 7:34.
- SDST – Lofton O'Groske 3-yard run (Eli Stader kick), 3:51. Jackrabbits 17–3. Drive: 8 plays, 69 yards, 4:54.

Third quarter

- No scoring plays.

Fourth quarter

- SDST – Eli Stader 28-yard field goal, 2:27. Jackrabbits 20–3. Drive: 8 plays, 55 yards, 5:13.

Statistics	SAC	SDST
First downs	7	28
Plays–yards	51–131	79–430
Rushes–yards	24–24	56–240
Passing yards	107	190
Passing: Comp–Att–Int	11–27–1	17–23–0
Turnovers	2	2
Time of possession	18:54	41:06

Team	Category	Player	Statistics
Sacramento State	Passing	Jaden Rashada	11/27, 107 yards, INT
Sacramento State	Rushing	Rodney Hammond Jr.	6 carries, 12 yards
Sacramento State	Receiving	Jordan Anderson	4 receptions, 49 yards
South Dakota State	Passing	Chase Mason	17/23, 190 yards, TD
South Dakota State	Rushing	Julius Loughridge	22 carries, 159 yards
South Dakota State	Receiving	Lofton O'Groske	5 receptions, 76 yards

=== at Nevada (FBS) ===
No. 18 Sacramento State Hornets (0–1) at Nevada Wolf Pack (FBS) (0–1) – Game summary

Quarter	1	2	3	4	Total
No. 18 Hornets	7	10	0	0	17
Wolf Pack (FBS)	0	13	0	7	20

at Mackay Stadium • Reno, NV

- Date: September 6, 2025
- Game time: 2:00 p.m. PDT
- Game attendance: 20,535
- Referee: Brad Carrell
- TV announcers (KNSN-TV): Alex Marguiles (play-by-play), Lucas Weber (analyst) and Shannon Kelly (sideline)

Game information

First quarter

- SAC – Rodney Hammond Jr. 5-yard run (Grant Meadors kick), 10:55. Hornets 7–0. Drive: 9 plays, 75 yards, 4:05.

Second quarter

- SAC – Grant Meadors 35-yard field goal, 13:04. Hornets 10–0. Drive: 16 plays, 81 yards, 7:59.
- NEV – Joe McFadden 37-yard field goal, 7:17. Hornets 10–3. Drive: 10 plays, 60 yards, 5:47.
- NEV – Chubba Purdy 3-yard run (Joe McFadden kick), 1:02. Tied 10–10. Drive: 6 plays, 45 yards, 2:51.
- SAC – Ernest Campbell 75-yard pass from Cardell Williams (Grant Meadors kick), 0:53. Hornets 17–10. Drive: 1 play, 75 yards, 0:09.
- NEV – Joe McFadden 40-yard field goal, 0:00. Hornets 17–13. Drive: 6 plays, 52 yards, 0:53.

Third quarter

- No scoring plays.

Fourth quarter

- NEV – Jonathan Maldonado 36-yard interception return (Joe McFadden kick), 2:17. Wolf Pack 20–17.

Statistics	SAC	NEV
First downs	15	23
Plays–yards	60–371	69–413
Rushes–yards	41–146	48–269
Passing yards	225	144
Passing: Comp–Att–Int	14–19–1	12–21–2
Turnovers	1	2
Time of possession	27:14	32:42

Team	Category	Player	Statistics
Sacramento State	Passing	Cardell Williams	11/13, 158 yards, TD, INT
Sacramento State	Rushing	Jamar Curtis	8 carries, 37 yards
Sacramento State	Receiving	Ernest Campbell	3 receptions, 89 yards, TD
Nevada	Passing	Chubba Purdy	12/21, 144 yards, 2 INT
Nevada	Rushing	Chubba Purdy	21 carries, 115 yards, TD
Nevada	Receiving	Marcus Bellon	2 receptions, 59 yards

=== Mercyhurst ===
Mercyhurst Lakers (1–1) at No. 21 Sacramento State Hornets (0–2) – Game summary

Quarter	1	2	3	4	Total
Lakers	10	8	7	3	28
No. 21 Hornets	7	14	7	21	49

at Hornet Stadium • Sacramento, CA

- Date: September 13
- Game time: 6:00 p.m. PDT
- Game attendance: 12,231
- Referee: Jim Crowley
- TV announcers (ESPN+): Jason Ross (play-by-play) and Darren Arbet (analyst)

Game information

First quarter

- SAC – Jordan Williams 19-yard pass from Cardell Williams (Grant Meadors kick), 13:23. Hornets 7–0. Drive: 4 plays, 74 yards, 1:33.
- MERC – Max Young 34-yard field goal, 8:46. Hornets 7–3. Drive: 12 plays, 58 yards, 4:37.
- MERC – Dylan Evans 24-yard pass from Adam Urena (Max Young kick), 3:29. Lakers 10–7. Drive: 6 plays, 39 yards, 2:38.

Second quarter

- MERC – Brian Trobel 1-yard run (Brian Trobel run), 6:02. Lakers 18–7. Drive: 15 plays, 85 yards, 7:36.
- SAC – Damian Henderson II 19-yard run (Grant Meadors kick), 2:36. Lakers 18–14. Drive: 9 plays, 78 yards, 3:18.
- SAC – Ernest Campbell 57-yard pass from Cardell Williams (Grant Meadors kick), 0:23. Hornets 21–18. Drive: 1 play, 57 yards, 0:09.

Third quarter

- SAC – Sam Adams II 15-yard run (Grant Meadors kick), 10:58. Hornets 28–18. Drive: 9 plays, 80 yards, 2:57.
- MERC – Rylan Davison 16-yard pass from Adam Urena (Max Young kick), 3:52. Hornets 28–25. Drive: 12 plays, 84 yards, 7:03.

Fourth quarter

- SAC – Damian Henderson II 4-yard run (Grant Meadors kick), 14:19. Hornets 35–25. Drive: 10 plays, 53 yards, 4:25.
- MERC – Max Young 24-yard field goal, 7:59. Hornets 35–28. Drive: 14 plays, 68 yards, 6:20.
- SAC – Damian Henderson II 30-yard run (Grant Meadors kick), 2:48. Hornets 42–28. Drive: 9 plays, 80 yards, 5:08.
- SAC – Cardell Williams 24-yard run (Grant Meadors kick), 1:32. Hornets 49–28. Drive: 3 plays, 43 yards, 0:23.

Statistics	MERC	SAC
First downs	22	26
Plays–yards	79–369	60–525
Rushes–yards	34–89	42–349
Passing yards	280	176
Passing: Comp–Att–Int	27–45–2	8–18–0
Turnovers	2	1
Time of possession	35:27	24:33

Team	Category	Player	Statistics
Mercyhurst	Passing	Adam Urena	27/44, 280 yards, 2 TD, 2 INT
Mercyhurst	Rushing	Brian Trobel	10 carries, 62 yards, TD
Mercyhurst	Receiving	Joe Kerbacher	4 receptions, 61 yards
Sacramento State	Passing	Cardell Williams	8/17, 176 yards, 2 TD
Sacramento State	Rushing	Damian Henderson II	12 carries, 98 yards, 3 TD
Sacramento State	Receiving	Ernest Campbell	2 receptions, 78 yards, TD

=== Central Arkansas ===
Central Arkansas Bears (1–2) at No. 24 Sacramento State Hornets (1–2) – Game summary

Quarter	1	2	3	4	Total
Bears	0	6	0	10	16
No. 24 Hornets	21	7	10	7	45

at Hornet Stadium • Sacramento, CA

- Date: September 20
- Game time: 6:00 p.m. PDT
- Game weather: Sunny • Temperature: 87 °F (31 °C) • Wind: SW at 5 miles per hour (8.0 km/h)
- Game attendance: 13,253
- Referee: Robert Quello
- TV announcers (ESPN+): Jason Ross (play-by-play) and Darren Arbet (analyst)

Game information

First quarter

- SAC – Rodney Hammond Jr. 8-yard run (Grant Meadors kick), 11:11. Hornets 7–0. Drive: 8 plays, 85 yards, 3:46.
- SAC – Sam Adams II 9-yard pass from Cardell Williams (Grant Meadors kick), 4:14. Hornets 14–0. Drive: 6 plays, 78 yards, 2:59.
- SAC – Damian Henderson II 85-yard run (Grant Meadors kick), 1:14. Hornets 21–0. Drive: 2 plays, 80 yards, 0:19.

Second quarter

- SAC – Cardell Williams 3-yard run (Grant Meadors kick), 5:12. Hornets 28–0. Drive: 8 plays, 50 yards, 4:06.
- CARK – Tyrell Pollard 18-yard pass from Luther Richesson (Caleb Jones kick failed), 0:17. Hornets 28–6. Drive: 16 plays, 87 yards, 4:50.

Third quarter

- SAC – Cardell Williams 21-yard run (Grant Meadors kick), 8:09. Hornets 35–6. Drive: 8 plays, 88 yards, 3:31.
- SAC – Grant Meadors 27-yard field goal, 0:03. Hornets 38–6. Drive: 11 plays, 67 yards, 5:35.

Fourth quarter

- CARK – Landen Chambers 1-yard run (Caleb Jones kick), 12:37. Hornets 38–13. Drive: 7 plays, 75 yards, 2:26.
- CARK – Caleb Jones 38-yard field goal, 10:29. Hornets 38–16. Drive: 4 plays, -5 yards, 2:01.
- SAC – Ernest Campbell 50-yard pass from Jaden Rashada (Grant Meadors kick), 8:01. Hornets 45–16. Drive: 5 plays, 86 yards, 2:18.

Statistics	CARK	SAC
First downs	19	19
Plays–yards	70–282	61–602
Rushes–yards	44–87	39–262
Passing yards	195	340
Passing: Comp–Att–Int	17–26–0	17–22–0
Turnovers	0	1
Time of possession	30:19	29:41

Team	Category	Player	Statistics
Central Arkansas	Passing	Luther Richesson	17/26, 195 yards, TD
Central Arkansas	Rushing	Landen Chambers	22 carries, 108 yards, TD
Central Arkansas	Receiving	Tyrell Pollard	4 receptions, 84 yards, TD
Sacramento State	Passing	Cardell Williams	15/20, 252 yards, TD
Sacramento State	Rushing	Damian Henderson II	15 carries, 137 yards, TD
Sacramento State	Receiving	Jordan Anderson	3 receptions, 98 yards

=== Cal Poly ===
Cal Poly Mustangs (2–2) at No. 21 Sacramento State Hornets (2–2) – Game summary

Quarter	1	2	3	4	Total
Mustangs	18	7	7	0	32
No. 21 Hornets	7	14	0	3	24

at Hornet Stadium • Sacramento, CA

- Date: September 27
- Game time: 6:00 p.m. PDT
- Game weather: Sunny • Temperature: 76 °F (24 °C) • Wind: SW at 11 miles per hour (18 km/h)
- Game attendance: 15,016
- Referee: Kelly Holman
- TV announcers (ESPN+): Jason Ross (play-by-play) and Darren Arbet (analyst)

Game information

First quarter

- SAC – Sam Adams II 23-yard pass from Rodney Hammond Jr. (Grant Meadors kick), 11:47. Hornets 7–0. Drive: 7 plays, 75 yards, 3:13.
- CP – Brian Dukes Jr. 23-yard interception return (Tyrei Washington run), 6:59. Mustangs 8–7.
- CP – Jordan Garrison 55-yard pass from Bo Kelly (Noah Serna kick), 3:44. Mustangs 15–7. Drive: 4 plays, 76 yards, 1:04.
- CP – Gianluca Dimauro 27-yard field goal, 0:56. Mustangs 18–7. Drive: 6 plays, 11 yards, 2:18.

Second quarter

- SAC – Ernest Campbell 62-yard pass from Cardell Williams (Grant Meadors kick), 14:52. Mustangs 18–14. Drive: 3 plays, 70 yards, 0:56.
- SAC – Cardell Williams 15-yard run (Grant Meadors kick), 5:18. Hornets 21–18. Drive: 13 plays, 80 yards, 6:12.
- CP – Tyrei Washington 1-yard run (Noah Serna kick), 2:06. Mustangs 25–21. Drive: 7 plays, 75 yards, 3:12.

Third quarter

- CP – Jordan Garrison 5-yard pass from Bo Kelly (Noah Serna kick), 5:46. Mustangs 32–21. Drive: 7 plays, 86 yards, 3:47.

Fourth quarter

- SAC – Grant Meadors 30-yard field goal, 12:54. Mustangs 32–24. Drive: 10 plays, 67 yards, 3:36.

Statistics	CP	SAC
First downs	17	20
Plays–yards	66–381	77–426
Rushes–yards	39–178	46–230
Passing yards	203	196
Passing: Comp–Att–Int	17–27–0	12–31–3
Turnovers	0	3
Time of possession	31:42	28:18

Team	Category	Player	Statistics
Cal Poly	Passing	Bo Kelly	17/27, 203 yards, 2 TD
Cal Poly	Rushing	Tyrei Washington	22 carries, 113 yards, TD
Cal Poly	Receiving	Jordan Garrison	4 receptions, 73 yards, 2 TD
Sacramento State	Passing	Cardell Williams	10/24, 164 yards, TD, 3 INT
Sacramento State	Rushing	Rodney Hammond Jr.	19 carries, 105 yards
Sacramento State	Receiving	Ernest Campbell	3 receptions, 91 yards, TD

=== at Weber State ===
Sacramento State Hornets (2–3) at Weber State Wildcats (2–3) – Game summary

Quarter	1	2	3	4	Total
Hornets	7	21	7	20	55
Wildcats	3	7	10	7	27

at Stewart Stadium • Ogden, UT

- Date: October 11
- Game time: 5:00 p.m. PDT
- Game attendance: 2,126
- Referee: Jeff Rink
- TV: ESPN+

Game information

First quarter

- CARK – Sloan Calder 52-yard field goal, 5:55. Wildcats 3–0. Drive: 5 plays, 15 yards, 1:20.'
- SAC – Cardell Williams 10-yard run (Grant Meadors kick), 0:55. Hornets 7–3. Drive: 13 plays, 50 yards, 4:53.

Second quarter

- SAC – Rodney Hammond Jr. 14-yard run (Grant Meadors kick), 14:02. Hornets 14–3. Drive: 1 play, 14 yards, 0:04.
- SAC – Cardell Williams 51-yard run (Grant Meadors kick), 11:03. Hornets 21–3. Drive: 6 plays, 71 yards, 2:31.
- WEB – Dijon Jennings 5-yard run (Sloan Calder kick), 5:10. Hornets 21–10. Drive: 13 plays, 75 yards, 5:53.
- SAC – JaQuail Smith 13-yard run (Grant Meadors kick), 0:50. Hornets 28–10. Drive: 8 plays, 82 yards, 4:10.

Third quarter

- SAC – Rodney Hammond Jr. 8-yard run (Grant Meadors kick), 12:01. Hornets 35–10. Drive: 4 plays, 45 yards, 1:33.
- WEB – Sloan Calder 48-yard field goal, 7:30. Hornets 35–13. Drive: 9 plays, 42 yards, 4:25.
- WEB – Chauncey Sylvester 23-yard pass from Dijon Jennings (Sloan Calder kick), 1:37. Hornets 35–20. Drive: 7 plays, 57 yards, 2:17.

Fourth quarter

- SAC – Cardell Williams 3-yard run (Grant Meadors kick failed), 12:17. Hornets 41–20. Drive: 10 plays, 75 yards, 4:20.
- WEB – Chauncey Sylvester 5-yard run (Sloan Calder kick), 8:36. Hornets 41–27. Drive: 8 plays, 80 yards, 3:35.
- SAC – Rodney Hammond Jr. 99-yard kickoff return (Grant Meadors kick), 8:21. Hornets 48–27.
- SAC – JaQuail Smith 24-yard run (Grant Meadors kick), 2:46. Hornets 55–27. Drive: 6 plays, 51 yards, 3:14.

Statistics	SAC	WEB
First downs	22	19
Plays–yards	60–460	69–301
Rushes–yards	50–397	41–144
Passing yards	63	157
Passing: Comp–Att–Int	6–10–0	16–28–0
Turnovers	0	0
Time of possession	28:58	31:02

Team	Category	Player	Statistics
Sacramento State	Passing	Cardell Williams	5/9, 53 yards
Sacramento State	Rushing	Cardell Williams	12 carries, 139 yards, 3 TD
Sacramento State	Receiving	Rodney Hammond Jr.	1 reception, 25 yards
Weber State	Passing	Dijon Jennings	16/28, 157 yards, TD
Weber State	Rushing	Chauncey Sylvester	17 carries, 83 yards, TD
Weber State	Receiving	Chauncey Sylvester	4 receptions, 54 yards, TD

=== Northern Colorado ===
Northern Colorado Bears (3–3) at Sacramento State Hornets (3–3) – Game summary

Quarter	1	2	3	4	Total
Bears	0	21	7	7	35
Hornets	3	14	10	13	40

at Hornet Stadium • Sacramento, CA

- Date: October 18
- Game time: 6:00 PM PDT
- Game attendance: 20,022
- Referee: Kelly Holman
- TV: ESPN+

Game information

First quarter

- SAC – Grant Meadors 37-yard field goal, 7:08. Hornets 3–0. Drive: 10 plays, 56 yards, 4:26.

Second quarter

- SAC – Rodney Hammond Jr. 46-yard run (Grant Meadors kick), 14:10. Hornets 10–0. Drive: 4 plays, 54 yards, 1:32.
- UNCO – Carver Cheeks 75-yard pass from Eric Gibson Jr. (Jacob Willig kick), 13:25. Hornets 10–7. Drive: 2 plays, 75 yards, 0:45.
- UNCO – Brandon Johnson 2-yard run (Jacob Willig kick), 6:37. Bears 14–10. Drive: 11 plays, 76 yards, 5:10.
- SAC – Bear Tenney 25-yard pass from Cardell Williams (Grant Meadors kick), 2:20. Hornets 17–14. Drive: 9 plays, 74 yards, 4:09.
- UNCO – Carver Cheeks 6-yard pass from Eric Gibson Jr. (Jacob Willig kick), 0:24. Bears 21–17. Drive: 12 plays, 75 yards, 1:56.

Third quarter

- SAC – Sam Adams II 34-yard run (Grant Meadors kick), 10:29. Hornets 24–21. Drive: 10 plays, 75 yards, 4:31.
- UNCO – Brandon Johnson 2-yard run (Jacob Willig kick), 7:52. Bears 28–24. Drive: 6 plays, 75 yards, 2:37.
- SAC – Grant Meadors 28-yard field goal, 0:47. Bears 28–27. Drive: 14 plays, 61 yards, 7:05.

Fourth quarter

- SAC – Ricky Lee III 34-yard interception return (Grant Meadors kick), 14:53. Hornets 34–28.
- UNCO – Carver Cheeks 62-yard pass from Eric Gibson Jr. (Jacob Willig kick), 14:00. Bears 35–34. Drive: 4 plays, 75 yards, 0:53.
- SAC – Grant Meadors 34-yard field goal, 9:30. Hornets 37–35. Drive: 10 plays, 58 yards, 4:30.
- SAC – Grant Meadors 42-yard field goal, 2:01. Hornets 40–35. Drive: 4 plays, 6 yards, 2:07.

Statistics	UNCO	SAC
First downs	22	21
Plays–yards	68–484	74–434
Rushes–yards	35–163	57–323
Passing yards	321	111
Passing: Comp–Att–Int	21–33–4	9–17–0
Turnovers	4	0
Time of possession	24:03	35:57

Team	Category	Player	Statistics
Northern Colorado	Passing	Eric Gibson Jr.	21/33, 321 yards, 3 TD, 4 INT
Northern Colorado	Rushing	Mathias Price	16 carries, 102 yards
Northern Colorado	Receiving	Carver Cheeks	9 receptions, 223 yards, 3 TD
Sacramento State	Passing	Cardell Williams	8/16, 90 yards, TD
Sacramento State	Rushing	Rodney Hammond Jr.	21 carries, 134 yards, TD
Sacramento State	Receiving	Ernest Campbell	3 receptions, 39 yards

=== No. 4 Montana ===
No. 4 Montana Grizzlies (7–0) at Sacramento State Hornets (4–3) – Game summary

Quarter	1	2	3	4	Total
No. 4 Grizzlies	7	21	7	14	49
Hornets	7	14	0	14	35

at Hornet Stadium • Sacramento, CA

- Date: October 24
- Game time: 6:30 PM PDT
- Game weather: Clear • Temperature: 64 °F (18 °C) • Wind: SW at 7 miles per hour (11 km/h)
- Game attendance: 16,816
- Referee: Gregg Wilson
- TV announcers (ESPN2): Chuckie Kempf (play-by-play) and Darius Walker (analyst)

Game information

First quarter

- (5:04) SAC – Rodney Hammond Jr. 7-yard run, Grant Meadors kick (Drive: 13 plays, 68 yards, 6:41; Sacramento State 7–0)
- (1:22) MONT – Brooks Davis 24-yard pass from Keali'i Ah Yat, Ty Morrison kick (Drive: 8 plays, 55 yards, 3:33; Tied 7–7)

Second quarter

- (14:50) SAC – Ernest Campbell 63-yard pass from Cardell Williams, Grant Meadors kick (Drive: 4 plays, 75 yards, 1:32; Sacramento State 14–7)
- (12:46) MONT – Michael Wortham 64-yard pass from Keali'i Ah Yat, Ty Morrison kick (Drive: 5 plays, 75 yards, 1:57; Tied 14–14)
- (7:24) MONT – Michael Wortham 27-yard run, Ty Morrison kick (Drive: 4 plays, 40 yards, 2:03; Montana 21–14)
- (4:16) SAC – Rodney Hammond Jr. 6-yard run, Grant Meadors kick (Drive: 5 plays, 68 yards, 2:59; Tied 21–21)
- (1:00) MONT – Eli Gillman 13-yard run, Ty Morrison kick (Drive: 3 plays, 21 yards, 0:43; Montana 28–21)

Third quarter

- (10:18) MONT – Evan Shafer 11-yard pass from Keali'i Ah Yat, Ty Morrison kick (Drive: 9 plays, 75 yards, 4:42; Montana 35–21)

Fourth quarter

- (13:12) MONT – Michael Wortham 15-yard run, Ty Morrison kick (Drive: 8 plays, 55 yards, 3:58; Montana 42–21)
- (4:17) SAC – Cardell Williams 17-yard run, Grant Meadors kick (Drive: 14 plays, 87 yards, 5:20; Montana 42–28)
- (1:45) MONT – Malae Fonoti 4-yard run, Ty Morrison kick (Drive: 1 play, 4 yards, 0:05; Montana 49–28)
- (0:15) SAC – Cardell Williams 18-yard run, Grant Meadors kick (Drive: 7 plays, 75 yards, 1:30; Montana 49–35)

Statistics	MONT	SAC
First downs	18	24
Plays–yards	58–386	76–478
Rushes–yards	33–162	43–141
Passing yards	224	337
Passing: Comp–Att–Int	17–25–1	26–33–1
Turnovers	1	2
Time of possession	25:55	34:05

Team	Category	Player	Statistics
Montana	Passing	Keali'i Ah Yat	16/24, 196 yards, 3 TD, INT
Montana	Rushing	Michael Wortham	7 carries, 89 yards, 2 TD
Montana	Receiving	Michael Wortham	5 receptions, 80 yards, TD
Sacramento State	Passing	Cardell Williams	25/32, 332 yards, TD, INT
Sacramento State	Rushing	Rodney Hammond Jr.	12 carries, 54 yards, 2 TD
Sacramento State	Receiving	Ernest Campbell	9 receptions, 206 yards, TD

=== at Eastern Washington ===
Sacramento State Hornets (4–4) at Eastern Washington Eagles (4–4) – Game summary

Quarter	1	2	3	4	Total
Hornets	14	14	0	7	35
Eagles	10	3	0	0	13

at Roos Field • Cheney, WA

- Date: November 1
- Game time: 1:00 p.m. PDT
- Game attendance: 4,356
- Referee: Spencer Mumford
- TV: ESPN+

Game information

First quarter

- SAC – Cardell Williams 1-yard run (Grant Meadors kick), 12:52. Hornets 7–0. Drive: 5 plays, 75 yards, 2:08.
- EWU – Wilson Medina 5-yard pass from Nate Bell (Soren McKee kick), 8:41. Tied 7–7. Drive: 6 plays, 30 yards, 2:16.
- EWU – Soren McKee 51-yard field goal, 7:36. Eagles 10–7. Drive: 4 plays, -13 yards, 0:49.
- SAC – Rodney Hammond Jr. 59-yard run (Grant Meadors kick), 5:16. Hornets 14–10. Drive: 5 plays, 75 yards, 2:20.

Second quarter

- SAC – JaQuail Smith 45-yard run (Grant Meadors kick), 13:26. Hornets 21–10. Drive: 1 play, 45 yards, 0:11.
- SAC – Rodney Hammond Jr. 7-yard run (Grant Meadors kick), 4:07. Hornets 28–10. Drive: 5 plays, 35 yards, 2:16.
- EWU – Soren McKee 19-yard field goal, 0:00. Hornets 28–13. Drive: 8 plays, 27 yards, 0:52.

Third quarter

- No scoring plays.

Fourth quarter

- SAC – JaQuail Smith 29-yard run (Grant Meadors kick), 9:47. Hornets 35–13. Drive: 5 plays, 48 yards, 2:38.

Statistics	SAC	EWU
First downs	16	20
Plays–yards	62–391	83–278
Rushes–yards	56–376	30–38
Passing yards	15	240
Passing: Comp–Att–Int	3–6–1	30–53–0
Turnovers	3	0
Time of possession	29:29	30:31

Team	Category	Player	Statistics
Sacramento State	Passing	Cardell Williams	3/6, 15 yards, INT
Sacramento State	Rushing	Rodney Hammond Jr.	22 carries, 208 yards, 2 TD
Sacramento State	Receiving	Gavin Nelson	1 reception, 10 yards
Eastern Washington	Passing	Jake Schakel	24/38, 201 yards
Eastern Washington	Rushing	Nate Bell	5 carries, 24 yards
Eastern Washington	Receiving	Drew Carlson	4 receptions, 57 yards

=== at Portland State ===
Sacramento State Hornets (5–4) at Portland State Vikings (1–8) – Game summary

Quarter	1	2	3	4	Total
Hornets	14	7	14	17	52
Vikings	0	14	0	10	24

at Hillsboro Stadium • Hillsboro, OR

- Date: November 8
- Game time: 2:00 PM PST
- Game weather: Cloudy • Temperature: 57 °F (14 °C) • Wind: E at 2 miles per hour (3.2 km/h)
- Game attendance: 1,284
- Referee: Mike Bezner
- TV announcers (ESPN+): Matt Richert (play-by-play) and Scott Hermo (analyst)

Game information

First quarter

- SAC – Damian Henderson II 25-yard run (Grant Meadors kick), 8:57. Hornets 7–0. Drive: 12 plays, 83 yards, 6:03.
- SAC – Ernest Campbell 22-yard pass from Cardell Williams (Grant Meadors kick), 0:05. Hornets 14–0. Drive: 6 plays, 35 yards, 3:26.

Second quarter

- PRST – Delon Thompson 2-yard run (Mathias Uribe kick), 13:53. Hornets 14–7. Drive: 4 plays, 51 yards, 1:07.
- SAC – Ernest Campbell 65-yard pass from Cardell Williams (Grant Meadors kick), 13:36. Hornets 21–7. Drive: 1 play, 65 yards, 0:11.
- PRST – Charlie White 15-yard pass from Tyrese Smith (Mathias Uribe kick), 0:15. Hornets 21–14. Drive: 11 plays, 54 yards, 3:00.

Third quarter

- SAC – JaQuail Smith 6-yard run (Grant Meadors kick), 11:10. Hornets 28–14. Drive: 3 plays, 95 yards, 1:16.
- SAC – Rodney Hammond Jr. 41-yard run (Grant Meadors kick), 4:01. Hornets 35–14. Drive: 4 plays, 45 yards, 1:22.

Fourth quarter

- PRST – Tyrese Smith 1-yard run (Mathias Uribe kick), 13:17. Hornets 35–21. Drive: 11 plays, 75 yards, 5:44.
- SAC – Grant Meadors 35-yard field goal, 9:30. Hornets 38–21. Drive: 7 plays, 37 yards, 3:38.
- PRST – Mathias Uribe 31-yard field goal, 7:14. Hornets 38–24. Drive: 6 plays, 53 yards, 2:08.
- SAC – Rodney Hammond Jr. 19-yard run (Grant Meadors kick), 6:22. Hornets 45–24. Drive: 2 plays, 69 yards, 0:46.
- SAC – Sam Adams II 2-yard run (Grant Meadors kick), 3:35. Hornets 52–24. Drive: 2 plays, 14 yards, 0:37.

Statistics	SAC	PRST
First downs	18	17
Plays–yards	58–483	69–319
Rushes–yards	47–295	45–142
Passing yards	188	177
Passing: Comp–Att–Int	8–11–0	13–24–2
Turnovers	1	3
Time of possession	28:41	31:19

Team	Category	Player	Statistics
Sacramento State	Passing	Cardell Williams	8/11, 188 yards, 2 TD
Sacramento State	Rushing	Rodney Hammond Jr.	17 carries, 191 yards, 2 TD
Sacramento State	Receiving	Ernest Campbell	4 receptions, 103 yards, 2 TD
Portland State	Passing	Tyrese Smith	8/11, 105 yards, TD
Portland State	Rushing	Delon Thompson	22 carries, 80 yards, TD
Portland State	Receiving	Terence Loville	5 receptions, 106 yards

=== Idaho ===
Idaho Vandals (4–6) at Sacramento State Hornets (6–4) – Game summary

Quarter	1	2	3	4	Total
Vandals	0	3	3	14	20
Hornets	3	3	10	7	23

at Hornet Stadium • Sacramento, CA

- Date: November 15
- Game time: 6:00 p.m. PST
- Game weather: Sunny • Temperature: 61 °F (16 °C) • Wind: SE at 5 miles per hour (8.0 km/h)
- Game attendance: 15,467
- Referee: Gregg Wilson
- TV announcers (ESPN+): Jason Ross (play-by-play) and Darren Arbet (analyst)

Game information

First quarter

- SAC - Grant Meadors 30-yard field goal, 8:03. Hornets 3-0. Drive: 13 plays, 55 yards, 6:50.

Second quarter

- SAC - Grant Meadors 38-yard field goal, 5:30. Hornets 6-0. Drive: 8 plays, 58 yards, 3:44.
- IDHO - Owen Forsman 21-yard field goal, 1:20. Hornets 6-3. Drive: 10 plays, 71 yards, 4:10.

Third quarter

- SAC - Ernest Campbell 26-yard pass from Cardell Williams (Grant Meadors kick), 10:27. Hornets 13-3. Drive: 5 plays, 45 yards, 2:05.
- IDHO - Owen Forsman 22-yard field goal, 6:35. Hornets 13-6. Drive: 10 plays, 60 yards, 3:52.
- SAC - Grant Meadors 31-yard field goal, 1:37. Hornets 16-6. Drive: 11 plays, 62 yards, 4:55.

Fourth quarter

- IDHO - Nate Thomas 7-yard run (Owen Forsman kick), 13:37. Hornets 16-13. Drive: 8 plays, 75 yards, 2:58.
- IDHO - Joshua Wood 10-yard run (Owen Forsman kick), 3:17. Vandals 20-16. Drive: 11 plays, 91 yards, 6:18.
- SAC - Cardell Williams 2-yard run (Grant Meadors kick), 0:09. Hornets 23-20. Drive: 14 plays, 67 yards, 3:05.

Statistics	IDHO	SAC
First downs	19	25
Plays–yards	55–355	76–458
Rushes–yards	29–193	58–282
Passing yards	162	176
Passing: Comp–Att–Int	15–26–1	14–18–0
Turnovers	1	0
Time of possession	26:46	33:14

Team	Category	Player	Statistics
Idaho	Passing	Joshua Wood	15/26, 162 yards, INT
Idaho	Rushing	Joshua Wood	14 carries, 117 yards, TD
Idaho	Receiving	Nolan McWilliams	2 receptions, 49 yards
Sacramento State	Passing	Cardell Williams	14/18, 176 yards, TD
Sacramento State	Rushing	JaQuail Smith	14 carries, 122 yards
Sacramento State	Receiving	Ernest Campbell	6 receptions, 61 yards, TD

=== at No. 15 UC Davis (Causeway Classic) ===
Sacramento State Hornets (7–4) at No. 15 UC Davis Aggies (7–3) – Game summary

Quarter	1	2	3	4	Total
Hornets	0	14	13	0	27
No. 15 Aggies	14	3	0	14	31

at UC Davis Health Stadium • Davis, CA

- Date: November 22
- Game time: 1:00 p.m. PDT
- Game attendance: 14,590
- Referee: Robert Quello
- TV: ESPN+

Game information

First quarter

- UCD – Jordan Fisher 1-yard run (Hunter Ridley kick), 9:53. Aggies 7–0. Drive: 7 plays, 46 yards, 3:16.
- UCD – Jordan Fisher 2-yard run (Hunter Ridley kick), 0:06. Aggies 14–0. Drive: 9 plays, 62 yards, 3:36.

Second quarter

- SAC – Rodney Hammond Jr. 1-yard run (Grant Meadors kick), 7:57. Aggies 14–7. Drive: 15 plays, 66 yards, 7:03.
- SAC – Cardell Williams 1-yard run (Grant Meadors kick), 2:35. Tied 14–14. Drive: 6 plays, 15 yards, 2:37.
- UCD – Hunter Ridley 24-yard field goal, 0:00. Aggies 17–14. Drive: 10 plays, 55 yards, 2:30.

Third quarter

- SAC – Rodney Hammond Jr. 40-yard run (Grant Meadors kick failed), 9:28. Hornets 20–17. Drive: 4 plays, 71 yards, 1:44.
- SAC – Jamar Curtis 1-yard run (Grant Meadors kick), 1:12. Hornets 27–17. Drive: 12 plays, 64 yards, 6:17.

Fourth quarter

- UCD – Jordan Fisher 3-yard pass from Caden Pinnick (Hunter Ridley kick), 14:31. Hornets 27–24. Drive: 5 plays, 75 yards, 1:41.
- UCD – Samuel Gbatu Jr. 30-yard pass from Caden Pinnick (Hunter Ridley kick), 6:14. Aggies 31–27. Drive: 3 plays, 61 yards, 0:54.

Statistics	SAC	UCD
First downs	22	22
Plays–yards	74–343	59–406
Rushes–yards	65–326	29–100
Passing yards	17	306
Passing: Comp–Att–Int	3–9–1	24–30–0
Turnovers	1	2
Time of possession	35:09	24:51

Team	Category	Player	Statistics
Sacramento State	Passing	Cardell Williams	3/9, 17 yards, INT
Sacramento State	Rushing	Rodney Hammond Jr.	22 carries, 140 yards, 2 TD
Sacramento State	Receiving	Ernest Campbell	1 reception, 11 yards
UC Davis	Passing	Caden Pinnick	24/30, 306 yards, 2 TD
UC Davis	Rushing	Jordan Fisher	16 carries, 48 yards, 2 TD
UC Davis	Receiving	Samuel Gbatu Jr.	7 receptions, 127 yards, TD

== Ranking movements ==
Ranking movements Legend: ██ Increase in ranking ██ Decrease in ranking — = Not ranked RV = Received votes
	Week														
Poll	Pre	1	2	3	4	5	6	7	8	9	10	11	12	13	Final
STATS FCS	15	18	21	24	21	RV	RV	RV	RV						
Coaches	14	16	21	22	21	RV	—	RV	RV						
