= Dan Jackson (American football coach) =

American football coach

Current position
- Title: Head coach
- Team: South Dakota State
- Conference: MVFC
- Record: 19–7

Biographical details
- Born: Omaha, Nebraska, U.S.
- Education: University of Nebraska Omaha (bachelor's); South Dakota State University (master's)

Playing career
- 2003–2005: South Dakota State
- Position: Linebacker

Coaching career (HC unless noted)
- 2012–2013: South Dakota State (def. asst.)
- 2014–2018: South Dakota State (DB)
- 2019: South Dakota State (AHC/ST/CB/RC)
- 2020: Northern Illinois (CB/co-ST)
- 2021: Northern Illinois (CB/co-ST/DPGC)
- 2022–2023: Vanderbilt (DB)
- 2024: Idaho (DC/LB)
- 2025–present: South Dakota State

Head coaching record
- Overall: 19–7
- Tournaments: 1–1 (NCAA D-I Playoffs)

Accomplishments and honors

Championships
- 1 MVFC (2026)

Dan Jackson is an American football coach who is currently the head coach for the South Dakota State Jackrabbits.

== Playing career ==
Jackson played for the South Dakota State Jackrabbits from 2003 through 2005.

== Coaching career ==
Jackson got his first coaching job in 2012 at his alma mater South Dakota State Jackrabbits. Jackson would spend the next seven years with the Jackrabbits serving in multiple roles as the team's cornerbacks coach, special teams coordinator, recruiting coordinator, and assistant head coach. Jackson was hired by the Northern Illinois Huskies in 2020, where he served multiple roles for the team, serving as the cornerbacks coach, pass defense coordinator, and co-special teams coordinator. After spending two seasons with the Huskies, Jackson was hired as the secondary coach for the Vanderbilt Commodores. Then after two years with Vanderbilt, Jackson was hired by the Idaho Vandals as the team's defensive coordinator. Then after one season with the Vandals, Jackson got his first opportunity as a head coach as he was hired to be the South Dakota State Jackrabbits's next head coach on December 31, 2024.

== Head coaching record ==
Year	Team	Overall	Conference	Standing	Bowl/playoffs	STATS^{#}	Coaches^{°}
South Dakota State Jackrabbits (Missouri Valley Football Conference) (2025–present)
2025	South Dakota State	9–5	4–4	T–6th	L NCAA Division I Second Round	13	14
2026	South Dakota State	10–2	7–1	1st	NCAA Division I		
South Dakota State:		19–7	11–5				
Total:		19–7					
