= Chase Mason =

American football player (born 2002)

No. 7 – South Dakota State Jackrabbits
- Position: Quarterback
- Class: Senior

Personal information
- Born: October 9, 2002 (age 24)
- Listed height: 6 ft 4 in (1.93 m)
- Listed weight: 240 lb (109 kg)

Career information
- High school: Viborg-Hurley (Viborg, South Dakota)
- College: South Dakota State (2022–present)

Awards and highlights
- 2× FCS national champion (2022, 2023)
- Stats at ESPN

Chase Mason (born October 9, 2002) is an American football quarterback for the South Dakota State Jackrabbits.

== Early life ==
Mason grew up in Hurley, South Dakota. He attended and played high school football at Viborg-Hurley High School. As a junior, he passed for 2,218 yards and rushed for 1,159 and scored 55 total touchdowns as Viborg-Hurley won the class 9AA state championship. Mason tore his ACL during his senior year.

== College career ==
Mason initially enrolled at the University of Nebraska–Lincoln as a member of the Cornhuskers' baseball team. After his first semester he transferred to South Dakota State (SDSU) with the intent of playing football.

Mason tore his ACL a second time during preseason practice in his first season with the South Dakota State Jackrabbits. During his sophomore season he appeared in nine games and completed 16 of 26 pass attempts for 267 yards and one touchdown pass while also rushing for 184 yards and two touchdowns. Mason appeared in ten games the following season and passed for 133 yards and two touchdowns and also rushed for 464 yards and six touchdowns. He was named the Jackrabbits' starting quarterback entering his senior season.

=== College statistics ===
Season	Team	Games			Passing								Rushing			
Season	Team	GP	GS	Record	Cmp	Att	Pct	Yds	Y/A	TD	Int	Rtg	Att	Yds	Avg	TD
2023	South Dakota State	8	0	0–0	16	26	61.5	267	10.2	1	0	160.5	16	184	11.5	2
2024	South Dakota State	10	0	0–0	17	26	65.4	133	5.1	2	0	133.7	46	464	10.1	6
2025	South Dakota State	9	8	7–1	146	224	65.2	2,005	9.0	15	4	158.9	68	174	2.6	6
2026	South Dakota State	3	3	2–1	40	76	52.6	697	9.2	4	1	144.6	18	42	2.3	1
Career		30	11	9–2	219	352	62.2	3,102	8.8	22	5	154.0	148	864	5.8	15
