= List of South Dakota State Jackrabbits in the NFL draft =

This is a list of South Dakota State Jackrabbits football players in the NFL draft.

== Key ==
B	Back	K	Kicker	NT	Nose tackle
C	Center	LB	Linebacker	FB	Fullback
DB	Defensive back	P	Punter	HB	Halfback
DE	Defensive end	QB	Quarterback	WR	Wide receiver
DT	Defensive tackle	RB	Running back	G	Guard
E	End	T	Offensive tackle	TE	Tight end

== Selections ==
Year	Round	Pick	Overall	Player	Team	Position
1939	17	4	154	Bob Riddell	Philadelphia Eagles	E
1951	20	5	236	Harry Gibbons	Detroit Lions	B
1951	28	6	333	Dick Peot	Detroit Lions	T
1953	22	12	265	Pete Retzlaff	Detroit Lions	TE
1955	22	3	256	Jerry Welch	Baltimore Colts	B
1956	8	10	95	Dick Klawitter	Chicago Bears	C
1957	24	4	281	Harwood Hoeft	Baltimore Colts	E
1959	17	12	204	Leroy Bergan	Baltimore Colts	T
1961	19	12	264	Leland Bondhus	Green Bay Packers	T
1962	12	4	158	Joe Thorne	Green Bay Packers	B
1962	16	8	218	Ron Frank	San Francisco 49ers	T
1964	9	5	117	Wayne Rasmussen	Detroit Lions	B
1966	7	12	107	Ron Meyer	Chicago Bears	QB
1966	20	14	304	Ed Maras	Green Bay Packers	WR
1970	16	24	414	Tim Roth	Oakland Raiders	DB
1973	11	20	280	Phil Engle	Green Bay Packers	DT
1975	1	13	13	Lynn Boden	Detroit Lions	G
1975	8	14	196	Jerry Lawrence	Houston Oilers	DT
1976
1976	14	21	396	Bob Gissler	Miami Dolphins	LB
1978	5	19	129	Bill Matthews	New England Patriots	LB
1980	7	10	175	Chuck Loewen	San Diego Chargers	G
1986	8	23	217	Bruce Klosterman	Denver Broncos	LB
1993	7	20	188	Doug Miller	San Diego Chargers	LB
1995	7	22	230	Adam Timmerman	Green Bay Packers	G
1999	3	8	69	Steve Heiden	San Diego Chargers	TE
2010	6	23	192	Dan Batten	Buffalo Bills	DE
2018	2	17	49	Dallas Goedert	Philadelphia Eagles	TE
2019	7	9	223	Jordan Brown	Cincinnati Bengals	DB
2022	4	22	127	Pierre Strong Jr.	New England Patriots	RB
2022	7	20	241	Chris Oladokun	Pittsburgh Steelers	QB
2023	3	15	78	Tucker Kraft	Green Bay Packers	TE
2024	4	19	119	Mason McCormick	Pittsburgh Steelers	G
2024	5	38	173	Isaiah Davis	New York Jets	RB
