= Brian Bergstrom =

American football coach (born c. 1979)

Current position
- Title: Defensive coordinator & safeties coach
- Team: South Dakota State
- Conference: MVFC

Biographical details
- Born: c. 1979 (age 46–47); Burnsville, Minnesota, U.S.
- Education: Gustavus Adolphus College (2002); St. Cloud State University (2005)

Playing career
- 1998–2001: Gustavus Adolphus
- Position: Linebacker

Coaching career (HC unless noted)
- 2002: Shakopee HS (MN) (assistant)
- 2003–2004: St. Cloud State (GA)
- 2005: Crown (DC/LB)
- 2006–2010: Gustavus Adolphus (DC)
- 2011–2012: Minnetonka HS (MN) (DB)
- 2013: Augustana (SD) (ST/LB)
- 2014–2016: Augustana (SD) (DC)
- 2017–2018: South Dakota State (S)
- 2019–2021: South Dakota State (co-DC/S)
- 2022–2024: Winona State
- 2025–present: South Dakota State (DC/S)

Head coaching record
- Overall: 18–16
- Tournaments: 0–1 (NCAA D-II playoffs)

Accomplishments and honors

Championships
- 1 NSIC South Division (2022)

Awards
- All-MIAC (2001)

Brian P. Bergstrom (born c. 1979) is an American college football coach. He is the defensive coordinator and safeties coach for South Dakota State University, positions he has held since 2025, and from 2019 to 2021. He was the head football coach for Winona State University from 2022 to 2024. He also coached for Shakopee High School, St. Cloud State, Crown, Gustavus Adolphus, Minnetonka High School, and Augustana (SD). He played college football for Gustavus Adolphus as a linebacker.

== Head coaching record ==
Year	Team	Overall	Conference	Standing	Bowl/playoffs
Winona State Warriors (Northern Sun Intercollegiate Conference) (2022–2024)
2022	Winona State	8–4	8–3	T–1st (South)	L NCAA Division II First Round
2023	Winona State	5–6	5–5	7th	
2024	Winona State	5–6	5–5	9th	
Winona State:		18–16	18–13		
Total:		18–16			
