= South Dakota State Jackrabbits football =

College football team of South Dakota State University

2026 South Dakota State Jackrabbits football team
- First season: 1900; 126 years ago
- Athletic director: Justin Sell
- Head coach: Dan Jackson; 2nd season, 18–7 (.720)
- Location: Brookings, South Dakota
- Stadium: Dana J. Dykhouse Stadium (capacity: 19,340)
- NCAA division: Division I FCS
- Conference: Missouri Valley
- Colors: Blue and yellow
- All-time record: 678–485–36 (.580)

NCAA Division I FCS championships
- 2022, 2023

Conference championships
- NCC: 1922, 1924, 1925, 1933, 1939, 1949, 1950, 1953, 1954, 1955, 1957, 1961, 1962, 1963 GWC: 2007 MVFC: 2016, 2020, 2022, 2023, 2024, 2026
- Rivalries: North Dakota State (rivalry); South Dakota (rivalry); North Dakota
- Fight song: Ring the Bell
- Mascot: Jack Rabbit
- Marching band: The Pride of the Dakotas
- Website: South Dakota State Jackrabbits Athletics

The South Dakota State Jackrabbits football team represents South Dakota State University in college football. The program competes at the NCAA Division I Football Championship Subdivision (FCS) level as a member of the Missouri Valley Football Conference (MVFC). The Jackrabbits play their home games at Dana J. Dykhouse Stadium on South Dakota State's campus in Brookings, South Dakota.

South Dakota State has been year in and year out one of the best teams in Division I FCS over the past two decades. South Dakota State is also one of only 13 FCS schools to host ESPN's College GameDay.

For the 2019 GameDay matchup, the No. 3 Jackrabbits hosted the No. 1 North Dakota State Bison, where they would lose in a close battle 23–16 after losing their starting QB to a season ending knee injury.

As of November 2025, the Jackrabbits possess a 14- year streak of qualifying for the FCS playoffs, the second-longest in the country at the FCS level.

The Jackrabbits are two-time national champions. They achieved their first national championship win in school history on January 8, 2023, defeating North Dakota State 45–21.

The following season, on January 7, 2024, the Jacks defended their title by defeating Montana (13–2) with a score of 23–3. The Jackrabbits finished the season with a perfect 15–0 record under first-year head coach Jimmy Rogers, who previously served as defensive coordinator and was a captain of the 2009 SDSU team himself. It was the Jackrabbits first undefeated season in more than 70 years since the 1950 South Dakota State Jackrabbits compiled a 9–0–1 record.

== History ==
The Jackrabbits were an NCAA Division II program in the North Central Conference until moving to the Football Championship Subdivision in 2004.

In March 2004, SDSU initially began their Division I FCS era by being a charter member of the now-defunct Great West Football Conference (along with North Dakota State, Southern Utah, Cal Poly, UC Davis, Northern Colorado) and stayed there until 2007 when they were accepted into the Missouri Valley Football Conference and began league play in the 2008 season.

South Dakota State University has invested in their football program's facilities recently as they have some of the finest amenities and facilities at the FCS level including the largest video/scoreboard in the FCS (2015) a new 19,340-seat stadium (2016), and a large state-of-the-art student-athlete center in the north end zone (2010). Connected to the student-athlete center is one of the largest indoor practice facilities in NCAA Division I (completed in 2014). Due to the success of South Dakota State and North Dakota State football programs, the Dakota Marker game was featured on ESPN’s nationally televised College GameDay on October 26, 2019, becoming one of only a few FCS programs to be featured on the show.

South Dakota State reached the Football Championship Subdivision semi-finals seven times in 2017, 2018, 2020, 2021, 2022, 2023, and 2024 respectively. They've been to the FCS national championship game three times (2020, 2022 & 2023) and won two of the three.

They advanced to their first national championship game on May 8, 2021, after defeating the Delaware Fightin' Blue Hens 33–3 in the national semi-finals. They played No. 2 Sam Houston State for the national championship on May 16, 2021, and lost 23–21. The Jackrabbits finished the season 8–2 and as national runner-ups.

A year and a half later on January 8, 2023, they advanced to the national championship game again where they would win their first national title over conference rival North Dakota State, 45–21.

On January 7, 2024, the Jackrabbits successfully defended their National Title when they defeated the Montana Grizzlies football team 23–3. Their victory capped a 15-0 undefeated regular season for first-year coach Jimmy Rogers, including an 8-0 Missouri Valley Conference record.

=== Classifications ===
- 1952–1972: NCAA College Division
- 1973–2003: NCAA Division II
- 2004–present: NCAA Division I–AA/FCS

=== Conference affiliations ===
- Independent (1889–1921)
- North Central Intercollegiate Athletic Conference (1922–2003)
- Great West Conference (2004–2007)
- Missouri Valley Football Conference (2008–present)

== Players in the National Football League ==
A total of 34 Jackrabbits have played for NFL teams, including eight signed to team rosters as of September 2024. Those eight are:

- Dallas Goedert - Philadelphia Eagles
- Christian Rozeboom - Tampa Bay Buccaneers
- Pierre Strong Jr. - Green Bay Packers
- Chris Oladokun - Kansas City Chiefs
- Tucker Kraft - Green Bay Packers
- Isaiah Stalbird - New Orleans Saints
- Mason McCormick - Pittsburgh Steelers
- Isaiah Davis - New York Jets

There have been a total of 29 Jackrabbits drafted in the NFL draft.

As of 2026, Jim Langer and Adam Vinatieri are the only Jackrabbits to be inducted into the Pro Football Hall of Fame.

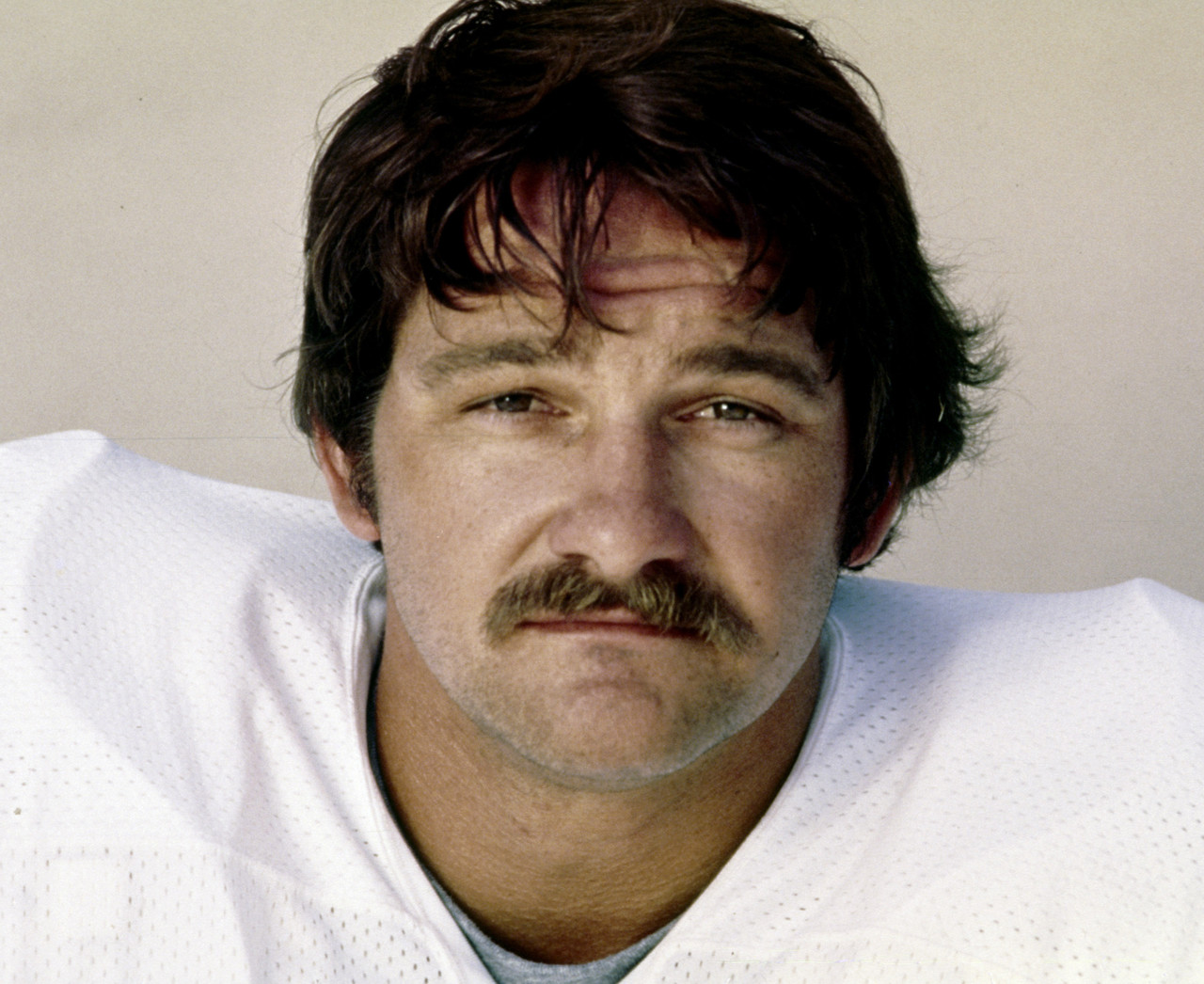
Jim Langer 2x Super Bowl Champion, SDSU's one of two NFL Hall of Famers.

== Record versus Missouri Valley Football Conference ==
- Records current as of November 2021

Rival	Record (W–L–T)	Winning Percentage
Illinois State	6–8	.429
Indiana State	10–2	.833
Missouri State	14–1	.933
Murray State	0–0	.000
North Dakota	36–47–5	.434
North Dakota State	45–64–5	.413
Northern Iowa	25–32–1	.439
South Dakota	58–54–7	.518
Southern Illinois	11–4	.733
Western Illinois	14–4	.778
Youngstown State	18–7	.720

== Postseason appearances ==
=== NCAA Division I-AA/FCS playoffs ===
Through November 2026, the Jackrabbits have appeared in the FCS playoffs sixteen times with an overall record of 25–13 (.658). Since earning the 2026 MVFC AQ bid, They will have made 15 consecutive appearances in the FCS playoffs, currently the longest streak in the nation.

In that span the Jackrabbits have won two national titles, one runner-up finish and have appeared in the semifinals seven times.

Year	Round	Opponent	Result
2009	First Round	Montana	L 48–61
2012	First Round; Second Round	Eastern Illinois; North Dakota State	W 58–10; L 3–28
2013	First Round; Second Round	Northern Arizona; Eastern Washington	W 26–7; L 17–41
2014	First Round; Second Round	Montana State; North Dakota State	W 47–40; L 24–27
2015	First Round	Montana	L 17–24
2016	Second Round; Quarterfinals	Villanova; North Dakota State	W 10–7; L 10–36
2017	Second Round; Quarterfinals; Semifinals	Northern Iowa; New Hampshire; James Madison	W 37–22; W 56–14; L 16–51
2018	Second Round; Quarterfinals; Semifinals	Duquesne; Kennesaw State; North Dakota State	W 51–6; W 27–17; L 21–44
2019	Second Round	Northern Iowa	L 10–13
2020	First Round; Quarterfinals; Semifinals; National Championship	Holy Cross; Southern Illinois; Delaware; Sam Houston State	W 31–3; W 31–26; W 33–3; L 21–23
2021	First Round; Second Round; Quarterfinals; Semifinals	UC Davis; Sacramento State; Villanova; Montana State	W 56–24; W 24–19; W 35–21; L 17–31
2022	Second Round; Quarterfinals; Semifinals; National Championship	Delaware; Holy Cross; Montana State; North Dakota State	W 42–6; W 42–21; W 39–18; W 45–21
2023	Second Round; Quarterfinals; Semifinals; National Championship	Mercer; Villanova; Albany; Montana	W 41–0; W 23–12; W 59–0; W 23–3
2024	Second Round; Quarterfinals; Semifinals	Montana; Incarnate Word; North Dakota State	W 35–18; W 55–14; L 21–28
2025	First Round; Second Round	New Hampshire; Montana	W 41–3; L 29–50

=== NCAA Division II playoffs ===
The Jackrabbits made one appearance in the NCAA Division II playoffs, with a final record of 0–1.

Year	Round	Opponent	Result
1979	Quarterfinals	Youngstown State	L 7–51

== Head coaches ==
#	Coach	Tenure
1	Morrison	1900
2	L. L. Gilkey	1901
3	J. Harrison Werner	1903
4	William Blaine	1904
5	William Juneau	1905–1908
6	Jason M. Saunderson	1909–1910
7	Fred Johnson	1911
8	Harry W. Ewing	1912–1917
-	No team	1918
9	Charles A. West	1919–1927
10	Cy Kasper	1928–1933
11	Red Threlfall	1934–1937
12	Jack V. Barnes	1938–1940
13	Thurlo McCrady	1941–1946
14	Ralph Ginn	1947–1968
15	Dave Kragthorpe	1969
16	Dean Pryor	1970–1971
17	John Gregory	1972–1981
18	Wayne Haensel	1982–1990
19	Mike Daly	1991–1996
20	John Stiegelmeier	1997–2022
21	Jimmy Rogers	2023–2024
22	Dan Jackson	2025–present

== Facilities ==
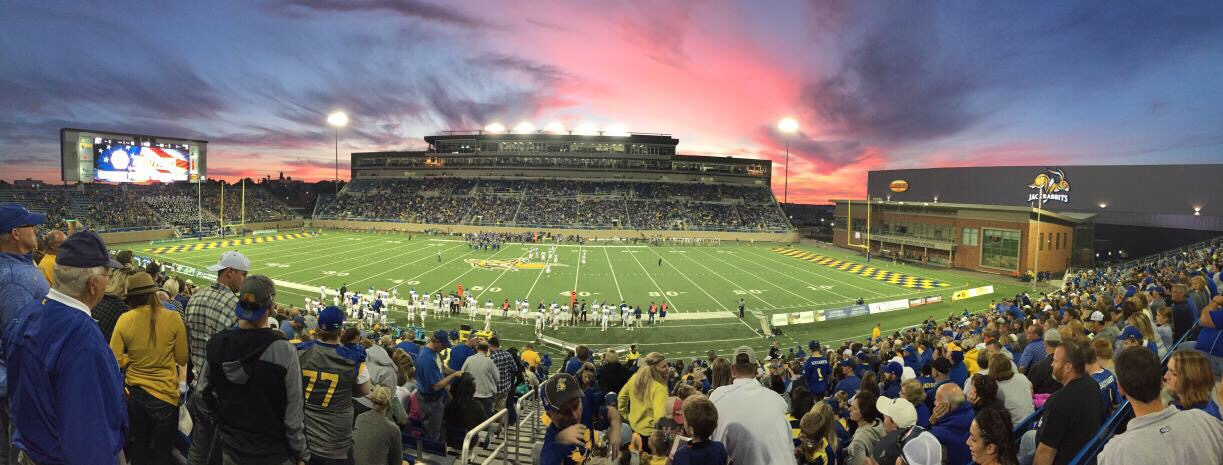
Dana J. Dykhouse Stadium – named for university benefactor and former football player Dana J. Dykhouse.

- Dana J. Dykhouse Stadium (19,340 capacity)
- Stiegelmeier Family Student-Athlete Center
- Dykhouse Student-Athlete Center (Connected to the Stiegelmeier Family Student-Athlete Center in north end zone)

In 2014, South Dakota State University started construction of a new stadium on the location of the current Coughlin-Alumni Stadium. The new stadium has a total seating capacity of 19,340 with easy expansion to 22,500.

The Stiegelmeier Family Student-Athlete Center (formerly the Sanford Jackrabbit Athletic Complex) is the Jackrabbits new State-of-the-art indoor practice facility. The facility was opened on October 11, 2014. The Stiegelmeier Family Student-Athlete Center has bleacher seating for up to 1,000 spectators and can be used for football practice, track practice, softball and baseball practice, track competitions, and other events within the SDSU athletic department. The 149,284-square foot facility is the largest indoor practice facility in Division I athletics and features an eight-lane, 300-meter track which is only one of five collegiate indoor tracks of that size in the nation. Inside the track is an 80-yard football field plus end zones at each end and is composed of a soy-based Astroturf. Within the facility it has areas for sports medicine and strength and conditioning. Sports medicine features include rehab space, a training room, weight room expansion, hydrotherapy, a football team room, offices and academic advising facilities. The Stiegelmeier Family Student-Athlete Center is used by many of SDSU's athletic programs.

== All-Time statistical leaders ==
=== Single-game leaders ===
- Passing Yards: Dan Fjeldheim (460, 9/28/2002)
- Rushing Yards: Zach Zenner (295 2x, 11/24/2012, 9/7/2013)
- Receiving Yards: Jeff Tiefenthaler (256, 9/27/1986)

=== Single-Season leaders ===
- Passing Yards: Taryn Christion (3,714, 2016)
- Rushing Yards: Josh Ranek (2,055, 1999)
- Receiving Yards: Jeff Tiefenthaler (1,534, 1986)

=== Career leaders ===
- Passing Yards: Taryn Christion (11,535, 2015–2018)
- Rushing Yards: Josh Ranek, (6,744, 1997–2001)
- Receiving Yards: Jake Wieneke (5,157, 2014–2017)

== Media coverage ==
All home and road games are covered on the Jackrabbit Sports Network. The broadcast range of the Jackrabbit Sports Network covers eight states (South Dakota, Minnesota, North Dakota, Iowa, Nebraska, Missouri, Kansas, and Wyoming), and consists of the following stations:

- WNAX 570AM (Flagship Station)
- KJJQ 910AM
- KRKI 99.5FM
- KOLY 1300AM
- KBFS 1450AM
- KGFX 1060AM
- KXLG 99.1FM

The Missouri Valley Football Conference and ESPN have signed a six-year media rights agreement, effective from the 2024 season. As part of the deal, a minimum of nine games will be showcased on ESPN, ESPN 2, or ESPN U throughout the contract. Additionally, the MVFC will maintain its "game of the week" digital package on ESPN+. The agreement also includes exclusive airing of additional league contests on ESPN platforms. Jackrabbits games have also been broadcast on Midco Sports Net, Fox College Sports, the Big Ten Network, Fox Sports North, ABC, and various local television networks.

== Record against FBS competition ==
Overall 2–11.

Season	Opponent	Conference	Result	Record
2008	Iowa State	Big 12	L 17–44	0–1
2009	Minnesota	Big Ten	L 13–16	0–2
2010	Nebraska	Big 12	L 3–17	0–3
2011	Illinois	Big Ten	L 3–56	0–4
2012	Kansas	Big 12	L 17–31	0–5
2013	Nebraska	Big Ten	L 20–59	0–6
2014	Missouri	SEC	L 18–38	0–7
2015	Kansas	Big 12	W 41–38	1–7
2016	TCU	Big 12	L 41–59	1–8
2018	Iowa State	Big 12	Canceled by weather	
2019	Minnesota	Big Ten	L 21–28	1–9
2021	Colorado State	Mountain West	W 42–23	2–9
2022	Iowa	Big Ten	L 3–7	2–10
2024	Oklahoma State	Big 12	L 20–44	2–11

== Future non-conference opponents ==
Announced schedules as of November 5, 2026.

2027	2028	2029	2030
at Iowa State	Dayton	vs Montana; Vegas Kickoff Classic, Las Vegas, NV	at Nebraska
St. Thomas	at Nebraska		
at Weber State	Weber State		
Southeastern Louisiana			
