= 2025 Northern Iowa Panthers football team =

American college football season

2025 Northern Iowa Panthers football
- Conference: Missouri Valley Football Conference
- Record: 3–9 (1–7 MVFC)
- Head coach: Todd Stepsis (1st season)
- Offensive coordinator: Nate Thompson (1st season)
- Defensive coordinator: Al Smith (1st season)
- Home stadium: UNI-Dome

2025 Missouri Valley Football Conference standings
	Conf.			Overall
Team	W		L	W		L
No. 4т North Dakota State $^	8	–	0	12	–	1
No. 9 South Dakota ^	6	–	2	10	–	5
No. 2 Illinois State ^	5	–	3	12	–	5
No. 14 North Dakota ^	5	–	3	8	–	6
No. 18 Youngstown State ^	5	–	3	8	–	5
No. 13 South Dakota State ^	4	–	4	9	–	5
No. 25 Southern Illinois	4	–	4	7	–	5
Northern Iowa	1	–	7	3	–	9
Murray State	1	–	7	1	–	11
Indiana State	1	–	7	3	–	9
$ – Conference champion; ^ – FCS playoff participant; Rankings from STATS Poll

The 2025 Northern Iowa Panthers football team was an American college football team that represented the University of Northern Iowa as a member of the Missouri Valley Football Conference (MVFC) during the 2025 NCAA Division I FCS football season. In its first year under head coach Todd Stepsis, the team compiled a 3–9 record (1–7 in conference games), was outscored by a total of 321 to 207, and finished in a three-way tie for last place in the MVFC. Stepsis took over from Mark Farley, who retired at the end of the 2024 season after 24 years as Northern Iowa's head football coach.

The team's statistical leaders included quarterback Matthew Schecklman (1,389 passing yards), running back Harrison Bey-buie (487 rushing yards), wide receiver JC Roque Jr. (56 receptions for 595 yards), and kicker Max Bartachek (53 points scored). Linebacker Tucker Langenberg was selected as a first-team player on the 2025 all-MVFC football team. Linebacker Ryan Crandall and defensive lineman Owen Ostroski were named to the second team.

The team played its home games at the UNI-Dome in Cedar Falls, Iowa.

== Schedule ==
Date	Time	Opponent	Site	TV	Result	Attendance
August 30	1:00 p.m.	Butler*	UNI-Dome; Cedar Falls, IA	ESPN+	W 38–14	9,079
September 6	3:00 p.m.	at Wyoming*	War Memorial Stadium; Laramie, WY	Altitude2	L 7–31	25,009
September 13	4:00 p.m.	Eastern Washington*	UNI-Dome; Cedar Falls, IA	ESPN+	W 17–14	10,774
September 20	7:00 p.m.	at Utah Tech*	Greater Zion Stadium; St. George, UT	ESPN+	L 9–20	4,784
October 4	4:00 p.m.	No. 15 North Dakota^{†}	UNI-Dome; Cedar Falls, IA	ESPN+	L 7–35	12,048
October 11	2:00 p.m.	at No. 2 South Dakota State	Dana J. Dykhouse Stadium; Brookings, SD	ESPN+	L 3–31	19,342
October 18	1:00 p.m.	No. 22 South Dakota	UNI-Dome; Cedar Falls, IA	ESPN+	L 14–17	8,434
October 25	2:00 p.m.	at No. 16 Southern Illinois	Saluki Stadium; Carbondale, IL	ESPN+	L 17–31	8,115
November 1	2:00 p.m.	at No. 17 Illinois State	Hancock Stadium; Normal, IL	ESPN+	L 16–31	7,756
November 8	1:00 p.m.	Murray State	UNI-Dome; Cedar Falls, IA	ESPN+	W 31–14	8,529
November 15	2:30 p.m.	at No. 1 North Dakota State	Fargodome; Fargo, ND	ESPN+	L 16–48	14,736
November 22	1:00 p.m.	No. 18 Youngstown State	UNI-Dome; Cedar Falls, IA	ESPN+	L 32–35	7,361
*Non-conference game; ^{†}Homecoming; Rankings from STATS Poll released prior to the game; All times are in Central time

== Preseason ==
=== MVFC poll ===
The Missouri Valley Football Conference released its preseason poll on July 21, 2025, voted on by league athletic directors, coaches, and media members. The Panthers were predicted to finish eighth in the conference.

== Game summaries ==
All times are Central time.

=== Butler ===
Butler Bulldogs (0–0) at Northern Iowa Panthers (0–0) – Game summary

Quarter	1	2	3	4	Total
Bulldogs	7	7	0	0	14
Panthers	10	7	14	7	38

at UNI-Dome, Cedar Falls, IA

- Date: August 30
- Game time: 1:00 p.m.
- Game weather: Indoors • Temperature: 72 °F (22 °C)
- Game attendance: 9,079
- Referee: David Hergert
- TV announcers (ESPN+): Brad Wells (play-by-play) & Justin Surrency (analyst)

Game information
First quarter
- (7:20) UNI – Derek Anderson 6-yard pass from Matthew Schecklman, Max Bartachek kick (Drive: 3 plays, 24 yards, 1:10; Northern Iowa 7–0)
- (2:22) BUT – Nick Munson 4-yard pass from Reagan Andrew, Beck Janki kick (Drive: 10 plays, 75 yards, 4:58; Tied 7–7)
- (0:09) UNI – Max Bartachek 36-yard field goal (Drive: 5 plays, 54 yards, 2:06; Northern Iowa 10–7)

Second quarter

- (9:55) BUT – Reagan Andrew 9-yard run, Beck Janki kick (Drive: 11 plays, 78 yards, 5:09; Butler 14–10)
- (5:13) UNI – Harrison Bey-Buie 1-yard run, Max Bartachek kick (Drive: 10 plays, 80 yards, 4:36; Northern Iowa 17–14)

Third quarter

- (9:51) UNI – Tysen Kershaw 16-yard pass from Matthew Schecklman, Max Bartachek kick (Drive: 9 plays, 77 yards, 5:03; Northern Iowa 24–14)
- (1:03) UNI – JC Roque Jr. 26-yard pass from Matthew Schecklman, Max Bartachek kick (Drive: 9 plays, 85 yards, 3:58; Northern Iowa 31–14)

Fourth quarter

- (12:24) UNI – Ayden Price 25-yard pass from Matthew Schecklman, Max Bartachek kick (Drive: 5 plays, 61 yards, 2:25; Northern Iowa 38–14)

Statistics	BUT	UNI
First downs	19	25
Total yards	336	448
Rushing yards	147	213
Passing yards	189	235
Passing: Comp–Att–Int	22-36-2	17–28–0
Time of possession	31:43	28:17

Team	Category	Player	Statistics
Butler	Passing	Reagan Andrew	22/36, 189 yards, TD, 2 INT
Butler	Rushing	Reagan Andrew	15 carries, 75 yards, TD
Butler	Receiving	Ethan Loss	8 receptions, 81 yards
Northern Iowa	Passing	Matthew Schecklman	15/25, 214 yards, 4 TD
Northern Iowa	Rushing	Harrison Bey-Buie	12 carries, 81 yards, TD
Northern Iowa	Receiving	Tysen Kershaw	2 receptions, 65 yards, TD

=== at Wyoming (FBS) ===
Northern Iowa Panthers (1–0) at Wyoming Cowboys (FBS) (1–0) – Game summary

Quarter	1	2	3	4	Total
Panthers	0	7	0	0	7
Cowboys (FBS)	7	10	7	7	31

at War Memorial Stadium, Laramie, WY

- Date: September 6, 2025
- Game time: 3:00 p.m.
- Game weather: Sunny • Temperature: 73 °F (23 °C) • Wind: N at 9 miles per hour (14 km/h)
- Game attendance: 25,009
- Referee: Cal McNeil
- TV announcers (Altitude 2): Nate Kreckman and Jared Petrino

Game information
First quarter
- (3:26) WYO – Sam Scott 18-yard run, Erik Sandvik kick (Drive: 5 plays, 78 yards, 2:05; Wyoming 7–0)

Second quarter

- (7:25) UNI – Harrison Bey-Buie 2-yard run, Max Bartachek kick (Drive: 11 plays, 90 yards, 6:34; Tied 7–7)
- (1:13) WYO – John Michael Gyllenborg 6-yard pass from Kaden Anderson, Erik Sandvik kick (Drive: 8 plays, 45 yards, 3:30; Wyoming 14–7)
- (0:00) WYO – Erik Sandvik 40-yard field goal (Drive: 3 plays, 12 yards, 0:26; Wyoming 17–7)

Third quarter

- (6:03) WYO – Chris Durr Jr. 21-yard pass from Kaden Anderson, Erik Sandvik kick (Drive: 10 plays, 76 yards, 4:31; Wyoming 24–7)

Fourth quarter

- (7:12) WYO – Samuel Harris 18-yard run, Erik Sandvik kick (Drive: 5 plays, 60 yards, 2:44; Wyoming 31–7)

Statistics	UNI	WYO
First downs	13	25
Plays–yards	58–170	63–379
Rushes–yards	29–59	37–189
Passing yards	111	190
Passing: Comp–Att–Int	16–29–2	20–26–0
Turnovers	2	1
Time of possession	30:41	29:19

Team	Category	Player	Statistics
Northern Iowa	Passing	Matthew Schecklman	15/26, 107 yards, 2 INT
Northern Iowa	Rushing	Christian Collins	4 carries, 22 yards
Northern Iowa	Receiving	Tysen Kershaw	6 receptions, 41 yards
Wyoming	Passing	Kaden Anderson	17/23, 167 yards, 2 TD
Wyoming	Rushing	Terron Kellman	7 carries, 87 yards
Wyoming	Receiving	John Michael Gyllenborg	5 receptions, 65 yards, TD

=== Eastern Washington ===
Eastern Washington Eagles (0–2) at Northern Iowa Panthers (1–1) – Game summary

Quarter	1	2	3	4	Total
Eagles	0	0	0	14	14
Panthers	7	3	7	0	17

at UNI-Dome, Cedar Falls, IA

- Date: September 13
- Game time: 4:00 p.m.
- Game weather: Indoors • Temperature: 72 °F (22 °C)
- Game attendance: 10,774
- Referee: Grant Henderson
- TV announcers (ESPN+): Brad Wells (play-by-play) and Justin Surrency (analyst)

Game information
First quarter
- (13:04) UNI – Tysen Kershaw 79-yard pass from Matthew Schecklman, Max Bartachek kick (Drive: 1 play, 79 yards, 0:12; Northern Iowa 7–0)

Second quarter

- (0:00) UNI – Max Bartachek 28-yard field goal (Drive: 10 plays, 88 yards, 2:57; Northern Iowa 10–0)

Third quarter

- (7:18) UNI – Ayden Price 63-yard pass from Matthew Schecklman, Max Bartachek kick (Drive: 3 plays, 79 yards, 1:24; Northern Iowa 17–0)

Fourth quarter

- (13:32) EWU – Nate Bell 15-yard run, Soren McKee kick (Drive: 4 plays, 37 yards, 1:28; Northern Iowa 17–7)
- (8:30) EWU – Nate Bell 40-yard run, Soren McKee kick (Drive: 5 plays, 55 yards, 1:54; Northern Iowa 17–14)

Statistics	EWU	UNI
First downs	16	23
Plays–yards	60–276	75–495
Rushes–yards	25–117	40–136
Passing yards	159	359
Passing: Comp–Att–Int	21–35–0	23–35–1
Turnovers	0	2
Time of possession	23:40	36:20

Team	Category	Player	Statistics
Eastern Washington	Passing	Nate Bell	21/35, 159 yards
Eastern Washington	Rushing	Nate Bell	14 carries, 89 yards, 2 TD
Eastern Washington	Receiving	Noah Cronquist	5 receptions, 42 yards
Northern Iowa	Passing	Matthew Schecklman	23/34, 359 yards, 2 TD, INT
Northern Iowa	Rushing	Harrison Bey-Buie	26 carries, 86 yards
Northern Iowa	Receiving	Tysen Kershaw	6 receptions, 143 yards, TD

=== at Utah Tech ===
Northern Iowa Panthers (2–1) at Utah Tech Trailblazers (0–3) – Game summary

Quarter	1	2	3	4	Total
Panthers	0	6	3	0	9
Trailblazers	0	7	7	6	20

at Greater Zion Stadium, St. George, UT

- Date: September 20, 2025
- Game time: 7:00 p.m.
- Game weather: Sunny • Temperature: 86 °F (30 °C) • Wind: S at 5 miles per hour (8.0 km/h)
- Game attendance: 4,784
- Referee: Branden McCain
- TV: ESPN+

Game information
First quarter
- No scoring plays

Second quarter

- (14:15) UNI – Max Bartachekk 46-yard field goal (Drive: 8 plays, 18 yards, 3:51; Northern Iowa 3–0)
- (11:10) UNI – Max Bartachek 26-yard field goal (Drive: 6 plays, 7 yards, 1:42; Northern Iowa 6–0)
- (0:17) UTU – Daniel Thomason 5-yard pass from Reggie Graff, Ilya Uvaydov kick (Drive: 17 plays, 86 yards, 4:43; Utah Tech 7–6)

Third quarter

- (9:23) UTU – Asa Chatman 66-yard run, Ilya Uvaydov kick (Drive: 6 plays, 92 yards, 2:27; Utah Tech 14–6)
- (2:27) UNI – Max Bartachek 23-yard field goal (Drive: 12 plays, 69 yards, 6:56; Utah Tech 14–9)

Fourth quarter

- (11:22) UTU – Ilya Uvaydov 23-yard field goal (Drive: 12 plays, 72 yards, 5:58; Utah Tech 17–9)
- (1:47) UTU – Ilya Uvaydov 28-yard field goal (Drive: 15 plays, 73 yards, 8:30; Utah Tech 20–9)

Statistics	UNI	UTU
First downs	11	22
Total yards	207	349
Rushing yards	47	239
Passing yards	160	110
Passing: Comp–Att–Int	18–31–0	12–22–1
Time of possession	26:45	33:15

Team	Category	Player	Statistics
Northern Iowa	Passing	Matthew Schecklman	18/31, 160 yards
Northern Iowa	Rushing	Bill Jackson	11 carries, 36 yards
Northern Iowa	Receiving	Ayden Price	2 receptions, 49 yards
Utah Tech	Passing	Reggie Graff	12/22, 110 yards, TD, INT
Utah Tech	Rushing	Reggie Graff	24 carries, 103 yards
Utah Tech	Receiving	DaJon Harrison	1 reception, 40 yards

=== No. 15 North Dakota ===
No. 15 North Dakota Fighting Hawks (2–2) vs. Northern Iowa Panthers (2–2) – Game summary

Quarter	1	2	3	4	Total
No. 15 Fighting Hawks	7	7	14	7	35
Panthers	0	0	0	7	7

at UNI-Dome, Cedar Falls, IA

- Date: October 4
- Game time: 4:00 p.m.
- Game weather: Indoors • Temperature: 72 °F (22 °C)
- Game attendance: 12,048
- Referee: Jason Perkins
- TV announcers (ESPN+): Brad Wells (play-by-play) and Justin Surrency (analyst)

Game information
First quarter
- (4:07) UND – Kaden Vig 63-yard fumble return, C.J. Elrichs kick (North Dakota 7–0)

Second quarter

- (1:08) UND – Nate DeMontagnac 20-yard pass from Jerry Kaminski, C.J. Elrichs kick (Drive: 7 plays, 84 yards, 2:03; North Dakota 14–0)

Third quarter

- (8:32) UND – B.J. Fleming 77-yard pass from Jerry Kaminski, C.J. Elrichs kick (Drive: 3 plays, 79 yards, 1:17; North Dakota 21–0)
- (4:29) UND – Sawyer Seidl 6-yard pass from Jerry Kaminski, C.J. Elrichs kick (Drive: 6 plays, 69 yards, 2:40; North Dakota 28–0)

Fourth quarter

- (6:23) UND – Deng Deng 12-yard pass from Jerry Kaminski, C.J. Elrichs kick (Drive: 5 plays, 66 yards, 2:19; North Dakota 35–0)
- (0:46) UNI – Derek Anderson 9-yard pass from Matthew Schecklman, Max Bartachek kick (Drive: 14 yards, 76 yards, 5:31; North Dakota 35–7)

Statistics	UND	UNI
First downs	20	22
Total yards	422	325
Rushing yards	176	124
Passing yards	246	201
Passing: Comp–Att–Int	20–23–0	27–41–1
Time of possession	23:37	36:23

Team	Category	Player	Statistics
North Dakota	Passing	Jerry Kaminski	20/23, 246 yards, 4 TD
North Dakota	Rushing	Gaven Ziebarth	7 carries, 62 yards
North Dakota	Receiving	B.J. Fleming	5 receptions, 134 yards, TD
Northern Iowa	Passing	Matthew Schecklman	27/40, 201 yards, TD, INT
Northern Iowa	Rushing	Bill Jackson	9 carries, 42 yards
Northern Iowa	Receiving	JC Roque Jr.	10 receptions, 73 yards

=== at No. 2 South Dakota State ===
Northern Iowa Panthers (2–3) vs. No. 2 South Dakota State Jackrabbits (5–0) – Game summary

Quarter	1	2	3	4	Total
Panthers	0	3	0	0	3
No. 2 Jackrabbits	7	7	7	10	31

at Dana J. Dykhouse Stadium, Brookings, SD

- Date: October 11
- Game time: 2:00 p.m.
- Game weather: Cloudy • Temperature: 64 °F (18 °C) • Wind: S at 15 miles per hour (24 km/h)
- Game attendance: 19,342
- Referee: Tyler Downs
- TV announcers (ESPN+): Tyler Merriam (play-by-play) and Kurtiss Riggs (analyst)

Game information
First quarter
- (4:31) SDST – Chase Mason 2-yard run, Eli Stader kick (Drive: 7 plays, 37 yards, 3:11; South Dakota State 7-0)

Second quarter

- (4:23) UNI – Max Bartachek 30-yard field goal (Drive: 13 plays, 67 yards, 7:24; South Dakota State 7-3)
- (2:02) SDST – Chase Mason 2-yard run, Eli Stader kick (Drive: 6 plays, 75 yards, 2:21; South Dakota State 14-3)

Third quarter

- (1:14) SDST – Greyton Gannon 22-yard pass from Chase Mason, Eli Stader kick (Drive: 6 plays, 77 yards, 3:04; South Dakota State 21-3)

Fourth quarter

- (11:06) SDST – Andrew Gustad 11-yard pass from Chase Mason, Eli Stader kick (Drive: 6 plays, 49 yards, 2:29; South Dakota State 28-3)
- (3:58) SDST – Eli Stader 30-yard field goal (Drive: 12 plays, 72 yards, 4:57; South Dakota State 31-3)

Statistics	UNI	SDST
First downs	14	24
Total yards	221	382
Rushing yards	78	120
Passing yards	143	262
Passing: Comp–Att–Int	14–27–4	20–33–0
Time of possession	28:01	31:59

Team	Category	Player	Statistics
Northern Iowa	Passing	Matthew Shecklman	12/20, 125 yards, 2 INT
Northern Iowa	Rushing	Bill Jackson	10 carries, 29 yards
Northern Iowa	Receiving	Tysen Kershaw	2 receptions, 48 yards
South Dakota State	Passing	Chase Mason	19/31, 251 yards, 2 TD
South Dakota State	Rushing	Julius Loughridge	19 carries, 76 yards
South Dakota State	Receiving	Alex Bullock	5 receptions, 82 yards

=== No. 22 South Dakota ===
No. 22 South Dakota Coyotes (4–3) at Northern Iowa Panthers (2–4) – Game summary

Quarter	1	2	3	4	Total
No. 22 Coyotes	7	3	7	0	17
Panthers	0	7	0	7	14

at UNI-Dome, Cedar Falls, IA

- Date: October 18
- Game time: 1:00 p.m.
- Game weather: Indoors • Temperature: 72 °F (22 °C)
- Game attendance: 8,434
- Referee: Gregory Gompf
- TV announcers (ESPN+): Brad Wells (play-by-play) and Justin Surrency (analyst)

Game information
First quarter
- (6:24) SDAK – Larenzo Fenner 18-yard pass from Aidan Bouman, Will Leyland kick (Drive: 10 plays, 79 yards, 6:34; South Dakota 7–0)

Second quarter

- (1:00) UNI – Briggs Hughston 4-yard pass from Matthew Schecklman, Max Bartachek kick (Drive: 10 plays, 88 yards, 4:32; Tied 7–7)
- (0:00) SDAK – Zeke Mata 58-yard field goal (Drive: 5 plays, 15 yards, 0:51; South Dakota 10–7)

Third quarter

- (7:26) SDAK – Larenzo Fenner 67-yard pass from Aidan Bouman, Will Leyland kick (Drive: 5 plays, 92 yards, 2:46; South Dakota 17–7)

Fourth quarter

- (0:41) UNI – Bill Jackson 7-yard pass from Matthew Schecklman, Max Bartachek kick (Drive: 9 plays, 56 yards, 0:36; South Dakota 17–14)

Statistics	SDAK	UNI
First downs	17	20
Total yards	293	285
Rushing yards	91	96
Passing yards	202	189
Passing: Comp–Att–Int	16–24–0	22–40–0
Time of possession	29:38	30–22

Team	Category	Player	Statistics
South Dakota	Passing	Aidan Bouman	16/24, 202 yards, 2 TD
South Dakota	Rushing	L. J. Phillips Jr.	15 carries, 73 yards
South Dakota	Receiving	Larenzo Fenner	3 receptions, 84 yards, 2 TD
Northern Iowa	Passing	Matthew Schecklman	22/40, 189 yards, 2 TD
Northern Iowa	Rushing	Matthew Schecklman	16 carries, 60 yards
Northern Iowa	Receiving	JC Roque Jr.	7 receptions, 91 yards

=== at No. 16 Southern Illinois ===
Northern Iowa Panthers (2–5) vs. No. 16 Southern Illinois Salukis (4–3) – Game summary

Quarter	1	2	3	4	Total
Panthers	0	3	0	14	17
No. 16 Salukis	10	14	7	0	31

at Saluki Stadium, Carbondale, IL

- Date: October 15, 2025
- Game time: 2:00 p.m.
- Game weather: Cloudy • Temperature: 61 °F (16 °C) • Wind: SE at 8 miles per hour (13 km/h)
- Game attendance: 8,115
- Referee: Jason Berg
- TV: ESPN+

Game information
First quarter
- (12:44) SIU – Chandler Chapman 32-yard run, Paul Geelen kick (Drive: 5 plays, 70 yards, 2:14; Southern Illinois 7–0)
- (3:38) SIU – Paul Geelen 40-yard field goal (Drive: 13 plays, 76 yards, 6:53; Southern Illinois 10–0)

Second quarter

- (9:44) SIU – Aidan Quinn 38-yard pass from DJ Williams, Paul Geelen kick (Drive: 5 plays, 76 yards, 2:15; Southern Illinois 17–0)
- (1:57) SIU – Jay Jones 38-yard pass from DJ Williams, Paul Geelen kick (Drive: 4 plays, 93 yards, 1:25; Southern Illinois 24–0)
- (0:07) UNI – Max Bartachek 32-yard field goal (Drive: 4 plays, -2 yards, 0:20; Southern Illinois 24–3)

Third quarter

- (13:18) SIU – Tae Marrero Jr. 81-yard punt return, Paul Geelen kick (Southern Illinois 31–3)

Fourth quarter

- (2:27) UNI – Briggs Hughston 23-yard pass from Jaxon Dailey, Max Bartachek kick (Drive: 4 plays, 34 yards, 1:53; Southern Illinois 31–10)
- (0:39) UNI – JC Roque Jr. 21-yard pass from Jaxon Dailey, Max Bartachek kick (Drive: 2 plays, 20 yards, 0:47; Southern Illinois 31–17)

Statistics	UNI	SIU
First downs	11	21
Total yards	247	433
Rushing yards	120	230
Passing yards	127	203
Passing: Comp–Att–Int	13–25–1	20–25–0
Time of possession	28:14	31:46

Team	Category	Player	Statistics
Northern Iowa	Passing	Jaxon Dailey	8/15, 93 yards, 2 TD
Northern Iowa	Rushing	Matthew Schecklman	9 carries, 51 yards
Northern Iowa	Receiving	Bill Jackson	5 receptions, 40 yards
Southern Illinois	Passing	DJ Williams	19/23, 190 yards, 2 TD
Southern Illinois	Rushing	Edward Robinson	9 carries, 86 yards
Southern Illinois	Receiving	Jay Jones	3 receptions, 52 yards, TD

=== at No. 17 Illinois State ===
Northern Iowa Panthers (2–6) at No. 17 Illinois State Redbirds (5–3) – Game summary

Quarter	1	2	3	4	Total
Panthers	0	3	7	6	16
No. 17 Redbirds	14	7	7	3	31

at Hancock Stadium, Normal, IL

- Date: November 1
- Game time: 2:00 p.m.
- Game weather: Sunny • Temperature: 50 °F (10 °C) • Wind: W at 8 miles per hour (13 km/h)
- Game attendance: 7,756
- Referee: Tyler Downs
- TV announcers (Marquee/ESPN+): Kurt Pegler (play-by-play), Zack Annexstad (analyst) and Kalia Butler (sideline)

Game information
First quarter
- (4:59) ILS – Tommy Rittenhouse 4–yard run, Matt Maldonado kick (Drive: 13 plays, 80 yards, 4:50; Illinois State 7–0)
- (1:31) ILS – Seth Glatz 2–yard run, Matt Maldonado kick (Drive: 4 plays, 61 yards, 1:20; Illinois State 14–0)

Second quarter

- (7:20) ILS – Javon Charles 19–yard pass from Rittenhouse, Matt Maldonado kick (Drive: 4 plays, 35 yards, 1:30; Illinois State 21–0)
- (0:24) UNI – Max Bartachek 28–yard field goal (Drive: 15 plays, 65 yards, 6:56; Illinois State 21–3)

Third quarter

- (9:11) UNI – Harrison Bey–Buie 2–yard run, Bartachek kick (Drive: 7 plays, 58 yards, 3:20; Illinois State 21–10)
- (4:30) ILS – Victor Dawson 9–yard run, Matt Maldonado kick (Drive: 12 plays, 75 yards, 4:41; Redbirds 28–10)

Fourth quarter

- (14:47) UNI – J.C. Roque Jr 41–yard pass from Jaxon Dailey, Max Bartachek kick failed (Drive: 8 plays, 87 yards, 4:37; Illinois State 28–16)
- (1:53) ILS – Maldonado 32–yard field goal (Drive: 14 plays, 44 yards, 6:49; Illinois State 31–16)

Statistics	UNI	ILS
First downs	16	25
Total yards	240	430
Rushing yards	98	202
Passing yards	142	228
Passing: Comp–Att–Int	15–23–2	28–37–0
Time of possession	28:32	31:28

Team	Category	Player	Statistics
Northern Iowa	Passing	Jaxon Dailey	15/23, 142 yards, TD, 2 INT
Northern Iowa	Rushing	Jaxon Dailey	16 carries, 40 yards
Northern Iowa	Receiving	J C Roque Jr	5 receptions, 53 yards, TD
Illinois State	Passing	Tommy Rittenhouse	28/37, 228 yards, 1 TD
Illinois State	Rushing	Victor Dawson	17 carries, 101 yards, TD
Illinois State	Receiving	Luke Mailander	4 receptions, 72 yards

=== Murray State ===
Murray State Racers (0–9) vs. Northern Iowa Panthers (2–7) – Game summary

Quarter	1	2	3	4	Total
Racers	0	14	0	0	14
Panthers	7	7	7	10	31

at UNI-Dome, Cedar Falls, IA

- Date: November 8
- Game time: 1:00 p.m.
- Game weather: Indoors • Temperature: 72 °F (22 °C)
- Game attendance: 8,529
- Referee: John Shay
- TV: ESPN+

Game information
First quarter
- (0:11) UNI – Bill Jackson 2-yard run, Max Bartachek kick (Drive: 6 plays, 38 yards, 2:50; Northern Iowa 7–0)

Second quarter

- (12:53) MUR – Darius Cannon 54-yard pass from Kaleb Bailey, Jack Tannehill kick (Drive: 5 plays, 75 yards, 2:18; Tied 7–7)
- (10:22) UNI – Bill Jackson 35-yard run, Max Bartachek kick (Drive: 4 plays, 79 yards, 2:25; Northern Iowa 14–7)
- (3:30) MUR – Jawaun Northington 12-yard run, Jack Tannehill kick (Drive: 13 plays, 99 yards, 6:52; Tied 14–14)

Third quarter

- (2:08) UNI – JC Roque Jr. 7-yard pass from Jaxon Dailey, Max Bartachek kick (Drive: 12 plays, 86 yards, 6:50; Northern Iowa 21–14)

Fourth quarter

- (11:55) UNI – Max Bartachek 45-yard field goal (Drive: 5 plays, 29 yards, 2:15; Northern Iowa 24–14
- (6:50) UNI – Bill Jackson 14-yard run, Max Bartachek kick (Drive: 7 plays, 50 yards, 4:05; Northern Iowa 31–14)

Statistics	MUR	UNI
First downs	19	23
Total yards	356	440
Rushing yards	197	307
Passing yards	159	133
Passing: Comp–Att–Int	13–21–1	8–11–0
Time of possession	27:05	32:55

Team	Category	Player	Statistics
Murray State	Passing	Kaleb Bailey	5/12, 113 yards, TD, INT
Murray State	Rushing	Kaleb Bailey	21 carries, 96 yards
Murray State	Receiving	Darius Cannon	4 receptions, 77 yards, TD
Northern Iowa	Passing	Jaxon Dailey	8/11, 133 yards, TD
Northern Iowa	Rushing	Bill Jackson	18 carries, 143 yards, 3 TD
Northern Iowa	Receiving	JC Roque Jr.	4 receptions, 50 yards, TD

=== at No. 1 North Dakota State ===
Northern Iowa Panthers (3–7) at No. 1 North Dakota State Bison (10–0) – Game summary

Quarter	1	2	3	4	Total
Panthers	0	2	7	7	16
No. 1 Bison	14	17	7	10	48

at Fargodome, Fargo, ND

- Date: November 15
- Game time: 2:30 p.m.
- Game weather: Indoors • Temperature: 72 °F (22 °C)
- Game attendance: 14,736
- Referee: Gregory Gompf
- TV announcers (ESPN+): Dom Izzo (play-by-play), Kyle Emanuel (analyst) and Sam Goetzinger (sideline)

Game information
First quarter
- (9:17) NDSU – Barika Kpeenu 1-yard run, Eli Ozick kick (Drive: 10 plays, 83 yards, 5:34; North Dakota State 7–0)
- (3:06) NDSU – Cole Payton 5-yard run, Eli Ozick kick (Drive: 1 play, 5 yards, 0:05; North Dakota State 14–0)

Second quarter

- (14:54) UNI – Caleb Frazer 0-yard safety (North Dakota State 14–2)
- (5:57) NDSU – Bryce Lance 14-yard pass from Cole Payton, Eli Ozick kick (Drive: 8 plays, 87 yards, 4:32; North Dakota State 21–2)
- (0:59) NDSU – Barika Kpeenu 1-yard run, Eli Ozick kick (Drive: 9 plays, 41 yards, 3:17; North Dakota State 28–2)
- (0:03) NDSU – Eli Ozick 46-yard field goal (Drive: 5 plays, 30 yards, 0:33; North Dakota State 31–2)

Third quarter

- (13:12) NDSU – Cole Payton 64-yard run, Eli Ozick kick (Drive: 1 play, 64 yards, 0:11; North Dakota State 38–2)
- (7:21) UNI – Ethan Schoville 0-yard punt return, Max Bartachek kick (North Dakota State 38–9)

Fourth quarter

- (9:59) UNI – JC Roque Jr. 14-yard pass from Jaxon Dailey, Max Bartacheck kick (Drive: 11 plays, 65 yards, 5:24; North Dakota State 38–16)
- (6:20) NDSU – Eli Ozick 23-yard field goal (Drive: 9 plays, 50 yards, 3:33; North Dakota State 41–16)
- (1:25) NDSU – Nathan Hayes 34-yard run, Eli Ozick kick (Drive: 9 plays, 70 yards, 3:17; North Dakota State 48–16)

Statistics	UNI	NDSU
First downs	13	24
Total yards	201	477
Rushing yards	102	209
Passing yards	99	268
Passing: Comp–Att–Int	9–23–2	18–25–0
Time of possession	29:47	30:13

Team	Category	Player	Statistics
Northern Iowa	Passing	Jaxon Dailey	9/23, 99 yards, TD, 2 INT
Northern Iowa	Rushing	Harrison Bey-Buie	9 carries, 62 yards
Northern Iowa	Receiving	J C Roque Jr	3 receptions, 42 yards, TD
North Dakota State	Passing	Cole Payton	15/17, 212 yards, TD
North Dakota State	Rushing	Cole Payton	10 carries, 74 yards, 2 TD
North Dakota State	Receiving	Bryce Lance	8 receptions, 131 yards, TD

=== No. 18 Youngstown State ===
No. 18 Youngstown State Penguins (7–4) vs. Northern Iowa Panthers (3–8) – Game summary

Quarter	1	2	3	4	Total
No. 18 Penguins	14	14	7	0	35
Panthers	3	0	15	14	32

at UNI-Dome, Cedar Falls, IA

- Date: November 22
- Game time: 1:00 p.m.
- Game weather: Indoors • Temperature: 72 °F (22 °C)
- Game attendance: 7,361
- Referee: Jason Perkins
- TV announcers (ESPN+): Mark Simpson (play-by-play) and Justin Surrency (analyst)

Game information
First quarter
- (11:29) YSU – Beau Brungard 7-yard run, Andrew Lastovka kick (Drive: 6 plays, 52 yards, 3:20; Youngstown State 7–0)
- (4:37) YSU – Beau Brungard 29-yard run, Andrew Lastovka kick (Drive: 5 plays, 91 yards, 3:09; Youngstown State 14–0)
- (0:49) UNI – Max Bartachek 40-yard field goal (Drive: 9 plays, 53 yards, 3:48; Youngstown State 14–3)

Second quarter

- (10:27) YSU – Alex McDonald 12-yard pass from Beau Brungard, Andrew Lastovka kick (Drive: 1 plays, 71 yards, 5:22; Youngstown State 21–3)
- (0:51) YSU – Beau Brungard 7-yard run, Andrew Lastovka kick (Drive: 7 plays, 50 yards, 3:18; Youngstown State 28–3)

Third quarter

- (13:01) UNI – JC Roque Jr. 6-yard pass from Jaxon Dailey, Max Bartachek kick (Drive: 6 plays, 75 yards, 1:59; Youngstown State 28–10)
- (5:15) UNI – Harrison Bey-Buie 1-yard run, Jaxon Dailey pass to JC Roque Jr. for two-point conversion (Drive: 11 plays, 87 yards, 6:01; Youngstown State 28–18)
- (3:27) YSU – Ethan Wright 3-yard pass from Beau Brungard, Andrew Lastovka kick (Drive: 5 plays, 75 yards, 1:48; Youngstown State 35–18)

Fourth quarter

- (13:20) UNI – Harrison Bey-Buie 2-yard run, Max Bartachek kick (Drive: 10 plays, 75 yards, 5:07; Youngstown State 35–25)
- (6:31) UNI – JC Roque Jr. 34-yard pass from Jaxon Dailey, Max Bartachek kick (Drive: 4 plays, 57 yards, 2:20; Youngstown State 35–32)

Statistics	YSU	UNI
First downs	19	18
Total yards	417	483
Rushing yards	191	131
Passing yards	226	352
Passing: Comp–Att–Int	20–25–0	25–34–0
Time of possession	30:14	29:46

Team	Category	Player	Statistics
Youngstown State	Passing	Beau Brungard	20/25, 226 yards, 2 TD
Youngstown State	Rushing	Beau Brungard	22 carries, 143 yards, 3 TD
Youngstown State	Receiving	Max Tomczak	5 receptions, 82 yards
Northern Iowa	Passing	Jaxon Dailey	25/34, 352 yards, 2 TD
Northern Iowa	Rushing	Jaxon Dailey	8 carries, 52 yards
Northern Iowa	Receiving	Bill Jackson	7 receptions, 115 yards
