= 2025 Murray State Racers football team =

American college football season

2025 Murray State Racers football
- Conference: Missouri Valley Football Conference
- Record: 1–11 (1–7 MVFC)
- Head coach: Jody Wright (2nd season)
- Co-offensive coordinators: Adam Ross (2nd season); Jimmy Ogle (2nd season)
- Defensive coordinator: Kirk Botkin (1st season)
- Home stadium: Roy Stewart Stadium

2025 Missouri Valley Football Conference standings
| | Conf. | | | Overall |
| Team | W | | L | W | | L |
|---|---|---|---|---|---|---|
| No. 4т North Dakota State $^ | 8 | – | 0 | 12 | – | 1 |
| No. 9 South Dakota ^ | 6 | – | 2 | 10 | – | 5 |
| No. 2 Illinois State ^ | 5 | – | 3 | 12 | – | 5 |
| No. 14 North Dakota ^ | 5 | – | 3 | 8 | – | 6 |
| No. 18 Youngstown State ^ | 5 | – | 3 | 8 | – | 5 |
| No. 13 South Dakota State ^ | 4 | – | 4 | 9 | – | 5 |
| No. 25 Southern Illinois | 4 | – | 4 | 7 | – | 5 |
| Northern Iowa | 1 | – | 7 | 3 | – | 9 |
| Murray State | 1 | – | 7 | 1 | – | 11 |
| Indiana State | 1 | – | 7 | 3 | – | 9 |
$ – Conference champion; ^ – FCS playoff participant; Rankings from STATS Poll

The 2025 Murray State Racers football team represented Murray State University as a member of the Missouri Valley Football Conference (MVFC) during the 2025 NCAA Division I FCS football season. The Racers were led by second-year head coach Jody Wright and played their home games at Roy Stewart Stadium in Murray, Kentucky.

== Preseason ==
=== MVFC poll ===
The Missouri Valley Football Conference released its preseason poll on July 21, 2025, voted on by league athletic directors, coaches, and media members. The Racers were predicted to finish last in the conference.

== Schedule ==
| Date | Time | Opponent | Site | TV | Result | Attendance |
|---|---|---|---|---|---|---|
| August 30 | 4:30 p.m. | at East Tennessee State* | William B. Greene Jr. Stadium; Johnson City, TN | ESPN+ | L 17–45 | 9,122 |
| September 6 | 6:00 p.m. | Southeastern Louisiana* | Roy Stewart Stadium; Murray, KY | ESPN+ | L 24–45 | 15,027 |
| September 13 | 6:00 p.m. | at Georgia State* | Center Parc Stadium; Atlanta, GA | ESPN+ | L 21–37 | 13,988 |
| September 20 | 6:00 p.m. | at Jacksonville State* | AmFirst Stadium; Jacksonville, AL | ESPN+ | L 10–45 | 21,426 |
| October 4 | 2:00 p.m. | at No. 21 South Dakota | DakotaDome; Vermillion, SD | ESPN+ | L 24–49 | 7,953 |
| October 11 | 6:00 p.m. | No. 9 Illinois State | Roy Stewart Stadium; Murray, KY | ESPN+ | L 32–46 | 5,647 |
| October 18 | 6:00 p.m. | No. 2 South Dakota State | Roy Stewart Stadium; Murray, KY | ESPN+ | L 14−35 | 6,746 |
| October 25 | 1:00 p.m. | at No. 22 Youngstown State | Stambaugh Stadium; Youngstown, OH | ESPN+ | L 17–51 | 9,664 |
| November 1 | 4:00 p.m. | No. 16 Southern Illinois^{†} | Roy Stewart Stadium; Murray, KY | ESPN+ | L 7–27 | 8,506 |
| November 8 | 1:00 p.m. | at Northern Iowa | UNI-Dome; Cedar Falls, IA | ESPN+ | L 14–31 | 8,529 |
| November 15 | 11:00 a.m. | No. 13 North Dakota | Roy Stewart Stadium; Murray, KY | ESPN+ | L 17–35 | 6,783 |
| November 22 | 12:00 p.m. | at Indiana State | Memorial Stadium; Terre Haute, IN | ESPN+ | W 31–17 | 2,834 |
*Non-conference game; ^{†}Homecoming; Rankings from STATS Poll released prior to the game; All times are in Central time

== Game summaries ==
=== at East Tennessee State ===
Murray State Racers (0–0) vs. East Tennessee State Buccaneers (0–0) – Game summary

| Quarter | 1 | 2 | 3 | 4 | Total |
|---|---|---|---|---|---|
| Racers | 0 | 3 | 14 | 0 | 17 |
| Buccaneers | 14 | 10 | 14 | 7 | 45 |

at William B. Greene Jr. Stadium, Johnson City, TN

- Date: August 30, 2025
- Game time: 4:30 p.m.
- Game weather: Sunny • Temperature: 79 °F (26 °C) • Wind: NW at 8 miles per hour (13 km/h)
- Game attendance: 9,122
- Referee: Bruce Austin
- TV announcers (ESPN+): Keith Brake (play-by-play) and Mark Hutsell (analyst)
- Box score, Recap

Game information
First quarter
- (5:03) ETSU – Khalil Eichelberger 2-yard run, Ewan Johnson kick (Drive: 6 plays, 60 yards, 1:51; East Tennessee State 7–0)
- (1:03) ETSU – Devontae Houston 1-yard run, Ewan Johnson kick (Drive: 5 plays, 67 yards, 2:06; East Tennessee State 14–0)

Second quarter

- (12:52) MSU – Jack Tannehill 22-yard field goal (Drive: 8 plays, 61 yards, 3:11; East Tennessee State 14–3)
- (10:31) ETSU – Jeremiah Harrison 26-yard pass from Cade McNamara, Ewan Johnson kick (Drive: 6 plays, 75 yards, 2:21; East Tennessee State 21–3)
- (0:21) ETSU – Ewan Johnson 33-yard field goal (Drive: 16 plays, 54 yards, 5:56; East Tennessee State 24–3)

Third quarter

- (12:36) MSU – Jawaun Northington 1-yard run (Drive: 6 plays, 65 yards, 2:24; East Tennessee State 24–10)
- (8:51) MSU – Brooks Kleinpeter 15-yard pass from Jim Ogle, Jack Tannehill kick (Drive: 4 plays, 35 yards, 2:29; East Tennessee State 24–17)
- (7:53) ETSU – Devontae Houston 7-yard run, Ewan Johnson kick (Drive: 3 plays, 75 yards, 0:58; East Tennessee State 31–17)
- (1:20) ETSU – Khalil Eichelberger 1-yard run, Ewan Johnson kick (Drive: 13 plays, 64 yards, 5:02; East Tennessee State 38–17)

Fourth quarter

- (11:57) ETSU – D'Marius Rucker 2-yard run, Ewan Johnson kick (Drive: 8 plays, 41 yards, 2:15; East Tennessee State 45–17)

| Statistics | MUR | ETSU |
|---|---|---|
| First downs | 18 | 31 |
| Total yards | 260 | 572 |
| Rushing yards | 34 | 392 |
| Passing yards | 226 | 180 |
| Passing: Comp–Att–Int | 22–35–2 | 17–25–1 |
| Time of possession | 28:51 | 31:09 |

| Team | Category | Player | Statistics |
|---|---|---|---|
| Murray State | Passing | Jim Ogle | 22–35, 226 yards, 1 TD, 2 INT |
| Murray State | Rushing | Jawaun Northington | 12 carries, 33 yards, 1 TD |
| Murray State | Receiving | Darius Cannon | 11 receptions, 86 yards |
| East Tennessee State | Passing | Cade McNamara | 12–17, 146 yards, 1 TD, 1 INT |
| East Tennessee State | Rushing | Devontae Houston | 14 carries, 128 yards, 2 TD |
| East Tennessee State | Receiving | Jeremiah Harrison | 3 receptions, 56 yards, 1 TD |

=== Southeastern Louisiana ===
Southeastern Louisiana Lions (0–1) vs. Murray State Racers (0–1) – Game summary

| Quarter | 1 | 2 | 3 | 4 | Total |
|---|---|---|---|---|---|
| Lions | 7 | 21 | 3 | 14 | 45 |
| Racers | 7 | 3 | 0 | 14 | 24 |

at Roy Stewart Stadium, Murray, KY

- Date: September 6, 2025
- Game time: 6:00 p.m.
- Game weather: Sunny • Temperature: 74 °F (23 °C)
- Game attendance: 15,027
- Referee: Grant Henderson
- TV announcers (ESPN+): Rob Cross (play-by-play) and Drayton Charlton-Perrin (analyst)

Game information
First quarter
- (9:56) SELA – Cade Collier 4-yard pass from Carson Camp, Guillermo Garcia Rodriguez kick (Drive: 12 plays, 68 yards, 4:58; Southeastern Louisiana 7–0)
- (3:31) MUR – Jordan Washington 21-yard run, Jack Tannehill kick (Drive: 10 plays, 80 yards, 3:52; Tied 7–7)

Second quarter

- (14:11) SELA – Rodeo Graham Jr. 12-yard run, Guillermo Garcia Rodriguez kick (Drive: 9 plays, 76 yards, 4:15; Southeastern Louisiana 14–7)
- (10:26) MUR – Jack Tannehill 30-yard field goal (Drive: 11 plays, 70 yards, 3:39; Southeastern Louisiana 14–10)
- (5:26) SELA – Kyle Lowe 26-yard run, Guillermo Garcia Rodriguez kick (Drive: 11 plays, 79 yards, 4:53; Southeastern Louisiana 21–10)
- (5:10) SELA – Khalid Moore 18-yard fumble return, Guillermo Garcia Rodriguez kick (Southeastern Louisiana 28–10)

Third quarter

- (4:27) SELA – Guillermo Garcia Rodriguez 21-yard field goal (Drive: 9 plays, 53 yards, 4:31; Southeastern Louisiana 31–10)

Fourth quarter

- (14:16) MUR – Cam Bulluck 37-yard pass from Jim Ogle, Jack Tannehill kick (Drive: 11 plays, 75 yards, 5:11; Southeastern Louisiana 31–17)
- (10:20) SELA – Kyle Lowe 5-yard run, Guillermo Garcia Rodriguez kick (Drive: 2 plays, 9 yards, 0:44; Southeastern Louisiana 38–17)
- (8:49) MUR – Jawaun Northington 1-yard run, Jack Tannehill kick (Drive: 6 plays, 75 yards, 1:31; Southeastern Louisiana 38–24)
- (0:33) SELA – Kyle Lowe 26-yard run, Guillermo Garcia Rodriguez kick (Drive: 8 plays, 75 yards, 3:28; Southeastern Louisiana 45–24)

| Statistics | SELA | MUR |
|---|---|---|
| First downs | 31 | 22 |
| Total yards | 480 | 380 |
| Rushing yards | 262 | 121 |
| Passing yards | 218 | 259 |
| Passing: Comp–Att–Int | 24–33–1 | 26–40–2 |
| Time of possession | 34:13 | 25:47 |

| Team | Category | Player | Statistics |
|---|---|---|---|
| Southeastern Louisiana | Passing | Carson Camp | 18–25, 173 yards, TD, INT |
| Southeastern Louisiana | Rushing | Kyle Lowe | 13 carries, 97 yards, 3 TD |
| Southeastern Louisiana | Receiving | Jaedon Henry | 4 receptions, 36 yards |
| Murray State | Passing | Jim Ogle | 25–39, 254 yards, TD, 2 INT |
| Murray State | Rushing | Jawaun Northington | 19 carries, 59 yards, TD |
| Murray State | Receiving | Cam Bulluck | 4 receptions, 76 yards, TD |

=== at Georgia State (FBS) ===
Murray State Racers (0–2) at Georgia State Panthers (FBS) (0–2) – Game summary

| Quarter | 1 | 2 | 3 | 4 | Total |
|---|---|---|---|---|---|
| Racers | 0 | 7 | 0 | 14 | 21 |
| Panthers (FBS) | 14 | 9 | 7 | 7 | 37 |

at Center Parc Stadium, Atlanta, GA

- Date: September 13, 2025
- Game time: 6:00 p.m.
- Game weather: Sunny
- Game attendance: 13,988
- Referee: Jeremy Parker
- TV announcers (ESPN+): Matt Stewart (play-by-play) and Sam Crenshaw (analyst)

Game information
First quarter
- (7:26) GAST – Ted Hurst 1-yard pass from TJ Finley, Braeden McAlister kick (Drive: 6 plays, 65 yards, 2:44; Georgia State 7–0)
- (2:47) GAST – Leo Blackburn 5-yard pass from Cameran Brown, Braeden McAlister kick (Drive: 9 plays, 58 yards, 3:44; Georgia State 14–0)

Second quarter

- (13:51) MUR – Jawaun Northington 5-yard run, Jack Tannehill kick (Drive: 10 plays, 75 yards, 3:56; Georgia State 14–7)
- (3:50) GAST – Jaylen Jones safety (Drive: 3 plays, -6 yards, 1:23; Georgia State 16–7)
- (0:48) GAST – Rashad Amos 1-yard run, Braeden McAlister kick (Drive: 2 plays, 4 yards, 0:47; Georgia State 23–7)

Third quarter

- (3:04) GAST – Ted Hurst 16-yard pass from Cameran Brown, Braeden McAlister kick (Drive: 10 plays, 76 yards, 4:54; Georgia State 30–7)

Fourth quarter

- (12:50) MUR – Lucas Desjardins 4-yard pass from Jim Ogle, two-point pass conversion attempt failed (Drive: 11 plays, 75 yards, 5:14; Georgia State 30–13)
- (7:07) GAST – Camden Overton-Howard 3-yard pass from Cameran Brown, Braeden McAlister kick (Drive: 10 plays, 70 yards, 5:38; Georgia State 37–13)
- (1:55) MUR – Baxter Wright 3-yard run, Baxter Wright two-point conversion pass to Tyrell Campbell (Drive: 11 plays, 75 yards, 5:12; Georgia State 37–21)

| Statistics | MUR | GAST |
|---|---|---|
| First downs | 22 | 18 |
| Total yards | 282 | 454 |
| Rushing yards | 123 | 166 |
| Passing yards | 159 | 288 |
| Passing: Comp–Att–Int | 19–30–0 | 21–30–2 |
| Turnovers | 1 | 3 |
| Time of possession | 29:05 | 30:55 |

| Team | Category | Player | Statistics |
|---|---|---|---|
| Murray State | Passing | Jim Ogle | 17/28, 138 yards, TD |
| Murray State | Rushing | Jawaun Northington | 14 carries, 64 yards, TD |
| Murray State | Receiving | Lucas Desjardins | 7 receptions, 75 yards, TD |
| Georgia State | Passing | TJ Finley | 11/18, 150 yards, TD, 2 INT |
| Georgia State | Rushing | Branson Robinson | 8 carries, 65 yards |
| Georgia State | Receiving | Ted Hurst | 10 receptions, 172 yards, 2 TD |

=== at Jacksonville State (FBS) ===
Murray State Racers (0–3) at Jacksonville State Gamecocks (FBS) (1–2) – Game summary

| Quarter | 1 | 2 | 3 | 4 | Total |
|---|---|---|---|---|---|
| Racers | 3 | 0 | 7 | 0 | 10 |
| Gamecocks (FBS) | 7 | 17 | 14 | 7 | 45 |

at AmFirst Stadium, Jacksonville, Alabama

- Date: Saturday September 20, 2025
- Game time: 6:00 p.m.
- Game weather: Sunny • Temperature: 69 °F (21 °C) • Wind: E at 5 miles per hour (8.0 km/h)
- Game attendance: 21,426
- Referee: Ron Hudson
- TV announcers (ESPN+): Eli Gold (play-by-play), Mickey Shadrix (analyst) and Taylor Korn (sideline)

Game information
First quarter
- (3:54) MUR – Jack Tannehill 43-yard field goal (Drive: 7 plays, 29 yards, 1:40; Murray State 3–0)
- (1:32) JVST – Brock Rechsteiner 17-yard pass from Gavin Wimsatt, Garrison Rippa kick (Drive: 7 plays, 75 yards, 2:22; Jacksonville State 7–3)

Second quarter

- (11:02) JVST – Garrison Rippa 27-yard field goal (Drive: 12 plays, 63 yards, 3:50; Jacksonville State 10–3)
- (1:25) JVST – Cam Cook 4-yard run, Garrison Rippa kick (Drive: 10 plays, 69 yards, 4:31; Jacksonville State 17–3)
- (0:13) JVST – Gavin Wimsatt 28-yard run, Garrison Rippa kick (Drive: 4 plays, 43 yards, 0:40; Jacksonville State 24–3)

Third quarter

- (9:46) MUR – Conlee Crossno 0-yard fumble return, Jack Tannehill kick (Jacksonville State 24–10)
- (6:08) JVST – Cam Cook 11-yard run, Garrison Rippa kick (Drive: 9 plays, 84 yards, 3:37; Jacksonville State 31–10)
- (0:06) JVST – Khristian Lando 5-yard run, Garrison Rippa kick (Drive: 10 plays, 72 yards, 4:27; Jacksonville State 38–10)

Fourth quarter

- (1:15) JVST – Caden Creel 13-yard run, Conor Donaghy kick (Drive: 7 plays, 72 yards, 2:36; Jacksonville State 45–10)

| Statistics | MUR | JVST |
|---|---|---|
| First downs | 16 | 29 |
| Total yards | 233 | 531 |
| Rushing yards | 92 | 329 |
| Passing yards | 141 | 202 |
| Passing: Comp–Att–Int | 21–33–2 | 19–34–0 |
| Turnovers | 2 | 1 |
| Time of possession | 29:28 | 30:32 |

| Team | Category | Player | Statistics |
| Murray State | Passing | Jim Ogle | 17/27, 130 yards, 2 INT |
|---|---|---|---|
| Murray State | Rushing | Jawaun Northington | 12 carries, 44 yards |
| Murray State | Receiving | Lucas Desjardins | 2 receptions, 33 yards |
| Jacksonville State | Passing | Gavin Wimsatt | 17/31, 188 yards, TD |
| Jacksonville State | Rushing | Cam Cook | 22 carries, 147 yards, 2 TD |
| Jacksonville State | Receiving | Brock Rechsteiner | 5 receptions, 89 yards, TD |

=== at No. 21 South Dakota ===
Murray State Racers (0–4) vs. No. 21 South Dakota Coyotes (2–3) – Game summary

| Quarter | 1 | 2 | 3 | 4 | Total |
|---|---|---|---|---|---|
| Racers | 7 | 0 | 10 | 7 | 24 |
| No. 21 Coyotes | 14 | 21 | 14 | 0 | 49 |

at DakotaDome, Vermillion, SD

- Date: October 4, 2025
- Game time: 2:00 p.m.
- Game weather: Indoors • Temperature: 72 °F (22 °C)
- Game attendance: 7,953
- Referee: Tyler Downs
- TV announcers (ESPN+): Jay Elsen (play-by-play) and Andre Fields (analyst)

Game information
First quarter
- (13:03) SDAK – Larenzo Fenner 41-yard pass from Aidan Bouman, Will Leyland kick (Drive: 4 plays, 57 yards, 1:50; South Dakota 7–0)
- (7:12) SDAK – L. J. Phillips Jr. 12-yard run, Will Leyland kick (Drive: 8 plays, 75 yards, 5:01; South Dakota 14–0)
- (1:04) MUR – J'Kalon Carter 16-yard pass from Jim Ogle, Jack Tannehill kick (Drive: 10 plays, 80 yards, 3:14; South Dakota 14–7)

Second quarter

- (9:51) SDAK – L.J. Phillips Jr. 17-yard run, Will Leyland kick (Drive: 10 plays, 75 yards, 6:13; South Dakota 21–7)
- (3:16) SDAK – L.J. Phillips Jr. 13-yard run, Will Leyland kick (Drive: 9 plays, 82 yards, 5:16; South Dakota 28–7)
- (0:08) SDAK – Zach Witte 6-yard pass from Aidan Bouman, Will Leyland kick (Drive: 12 plays, 89 yards, 2:25; South Dakota 35–7)

Third quarter

- (13:05) SDAK – L.J. Phillips Jr. 67-yard run, Will Leyland kick (Drive: 1 play, 67 yards, 0:11; South Dakota 42–7)
- (9:43) MUR – Darius Cannon 29-yard pass from J'Kalon Carter, Jack Tannehill kick (Drive: 8 plays, 78 yards, 3:16; South Dakota 42–14)
- (4:23) MUR – Jack Tannehill 25-yard field goal (Drive: 10 plays, 47 yards, 5:17; South Dakota 42–17)
- (1:13) SDAK – Jack Martens 28-yard pass from Aidan Bouman, Will Leyland kick (Drive: 5 plays, 67 yards, 3:04; South Dakota 49–17)

Fourth quarter

- (3:27) MUR – Tyrell Campbell 1-yard run, Jack Tannehill kick (Drive: 14 plays, 80 yards, 5:15; South Dakota 49–24)

| Statistics | MUR | SDAK |
|---|---|---|
| First downs | 19 | 29 |
| Total yards | 312 | 568 |
| Rushing yards | 100 | 380 |
| Passing yards | 212 | 188 |
| Passing: Comp–Att–Int | 17–31–0 | 12–17–0 |
| Time of possession | 26:36 | 33:24 |

| Team | Category | Player | Statistics |
|---|---|---|---|
| Murray State | Passing | Jim Ogle | 16/30, 183 yards, TD |
| Murray State | Rushing | Jordan Washington | 9 carries, 49 yards |
| Murray State | Receiving | Lucas Desjardins | 5 receptions, 54 yards |
| South Dakota | Passing | Aidan Bouman | 11/16, 185 yards, 3 TD |
| South Dakota | Rushing | L. J. Phillips Jr. | 24 carries, 244 yards, 4 TD |
| South Dakota | Receiving | Larenzo Fenner | 3 receptions, 108 yards, TD |

=== No. 9 Illinois State ===
No. 9 Illinois State Redbirds (3–2) at Murray State Racers (0–5) – Game summary

| Quarter | 1 | 2 | 3 | 4 | Total |
|---|---|---|---|---|---|
| No. 9 Redbirds | 21 | 10 | 12 | 3 | 46 |
| Racers | 3 | 14 | 7 | 8 | 32 |

at Roy Stewart Stadium, Murray, KY

- Date: October 11, 2025
- Game time: 6:00 p.m.
- Game weather: Sunny • Temperature: 78 °F (26 °C) • Wind: NE at 6 miles per hour (9.7 km/h)
- Game attendance: 5,647
- Referee: Gregory Gompf
- TV announcers (ESPN+): Casey Roehl (play-by-play), Drayton Charlton-Perrin (analyst)

Game information
First quarter
- (10:16) ILST – Daniel Sobkowicz 2-yard run, Matt Maldonado kick (Drive: 9 plays, 61 yards, 3:45; Illinois State 7–0)
- (3:44) ILST – Dylan Lord 4-yard pass from Tommy Rittenhouse, Matt Maldonado kick (Drive: 7 plays, 85 yards, 3:10; Illinois State 14–0)
- (0:45) MUR – Jack Tannehill 41-yard field goal (Drive: 8 plays, 56 yards, 2:52; Illinois State 14–3)
- (0:27) ILST – Victor Dawson 12-yard run, Matt Maldonado kick (Drive: 1 plays, 12 yards, 0:06; Illinois State 21–3)

Second quarter

- (12:06) ILST – Seth Glatz 52-yard pass from Tommy Rittenhouse, Matt Maldonado kick (Drive: 2 plays, 51 yards, 0:40; Illinois State 28–3)
- (5:37) MUR – Jordan Washington 6-yard run, Jack Tannehill kick (Drive: 15 plays, 77 yards, 6:24; Illinois State 28–10)
- (0:34) MUR – Jim Ogle 1-yard run, Jack Tannehill kick (Drive: 13 plays, 80 yards, 2:57; Illinois State 28–17)
- (0:00) ILST – Matt Maldonado 37-yard field goal (Drive: 4 plays, 55 yards, 0:34; Illinois State 31–17)

Third quarter

- (11:46) ILST – Javon Charles 19-yard pass from Tommy Rittenhouse, Matt Maldonado kick blocked (Drive: 8 plays, 75 yards, 3:14; Illinois State 37–17)
- (8:09) MUR – Jim Ogle 4-yard run, Jack Tannehill kick (Drive: 9 plays, 81 yards, 3:32; Illinois State 37–24)
- (3:23) ILST – Daniel Sobkowicz 24-yard pass from Tommy Rittenhouse, Tommy Rittenhouse conversion pass failed (Drive: 8 plays, 79 yards, 4:40; Illinois State 43–24)

Fourth quarter

- (14:55) MUR – Jawaun Northington 5-yard pass from Jim Ogle, Darius Cannon pass from Jim Ogle for two-point conversion (Drive: 7 plays, 83 yards, 3:16; Illinois State 43–32)
- (3:25) ILST – Matt Maldonado 26-yard field goal, (Drive: 19 plays, 88 yards, 9:57; Illinois State 46–32)

| Statistics | ILST | MUR |
|---|---|---|
| First downs | 31 | 26 |
| Total yards | 510 | 471 |
| Rushing yards | 172 | 170 |
| Passing yards | 338 | 301 |
| Passing: Comp–Att–Int | 21–25–0 | 24–40–1 |
| Time of possession | 30:57 | 29:03 |

| Team | Category | Player | Statistics |
|---|---|---|---|
| Illinois State | Passing | Tommy Rittenhouse | 21/25, 338 yards, 4 TD |
| Illinois State | Rushing | Victor Dawson | 10 carries, 71 yards, TD |
| Illinois State | Receiving | Daniel Sobkowicz | 8 receptions, 162 yards, TD |
| Murray State | Passing | Jim Ogle | 23/39, 283 yards, TD, INT |
| Murray State | Rushing | Jawaun Northington | 15 carries, 71 yards |
| Murray State | Receiving | Lucas Desjardins | 8 receptions, 95 yards |

=== No. 2 South Dakota State ===
No. 2 South Dakota State Jackrabbits (6–0) vs. Murray State Racers (0–6) – Game summary

| Quarter | 1 | 2 | 3 | 4 | Total |
|---|---|---|---|---|---|
| No. 2 Jackrabbits | 7 | 7 | 7 | 14 | 35 |
| Racers | 7 | 0 | 0 | 7 | 14 |

at Roy Stewart Stadium, Murray, KY

- Date: October 18, 2025
- Game time: 6:00 p.m.
- Game weather: Sunny • Temperature: 80 °F (27 °C) • Wind: S at 14 miles per hour (23 km/h)
- Game attendance: 6,746
- Referee: Gregory Gompf
- TV announcers (ESPN+): Casey Roehl (play-by-play) and Drayton Charlton-Perrin (analyst)

Game information
First quarter
- (5:51) SDST – Chase Mason 6-yard run, Eli Stader kick (Drive: 14 plays, 82 yards, 7:24; South Dakota State 7-0)
- ( 3:06) MUR – Darius Cannon 65-yard pass from Jim Ogle, Jack Tannehill kick (Drive: 2 plays, 80 yards, 0:36; 7-7)

Second quarter

- (7:14) SDST – Jack Smith 10-yard pass from Luke Marble, Eli Stader kick (Drive: 6 plays, 88 yards, 1:51; South Dakota State 14-7)

Third quarter

- (13:49) SDST – Jack Smith 46-yard pass from Luke Marble, Eli Stader kick (Drive: 4 plays, 59 yards, 1:04; South Dakota State 21-7)

Fourth quarter

- (13:15) SDST – Josiah Johnson 1-yard run, Eli Stader kick (Drive: 9 plays, 47 yards, 4:05; South Dakota State 28-7)
- (12:10) MUR – Jordan Washington 60-yard pass from Jim Ogle, Jack Tannehill kick (Drive: 3 plays, 68 yards, 1:05; South Dakota State 28-14)
- (5:51) SDST – James Basinger 6-yard run, Eli Stader kick (Drive: 10 plays, 52 yards, 5:52; South Dakota State 35-14)

| Statistics | SDST | MUR |
|---|---|---|
| First downs | 25 | 20 |
| Total yards | 469 | 438 |
| Rushing yards | 211 | 111 |
| Passing yards | 258 | 327 |
| Passing: Comp–Att–Int | 18–27–1 | 20–32–4 |
| Time of possession | 35:55 | 24:05 |

| Team | Category | Player | Statistics |
|---|---|---|---|
| South Dakota State | Passing | Luke Marble | 13/21, 189 yards, 2 TD, INT |
| South Dakota State | Rushing | Julius Loughridge | 25 carries, 88 yards |
| South Dakota State | Receiving | Alex Bullock | 6 receptions, 99 yards |
| Murray State | Passing | Jim Ogle | 20/32, 327 yards, 2 TD, 4 INT |
| Murray State | Rushing | Jordan Washington | 13 carries, 56 yards |
| Murray State | Receiving | Darius Cannon | 5 receptions, 100 yards, TD |

=== at No. 22 Youngstown State ===
Murray State Racers (0–7) vs. No. 22 Youngstown State Penguins (4–3) – Game summary

| Quarter | 1 | 2 | 3 | 4 | Total |
|---|---|---|---|---|---|
| Racers | 7 | 0 | 0 | 10 | 17 |
| No. 22 Penguins | 7 | 17 | 14 | 3 | 41 |

at Stambaugh Stadium, Youngstown, OH

- Date: October 25, 2025
- Game time: 1:00 p.m.
- Game weather: Sunny • Wind: SW at 5 miles per hour (8.0 km/h)
- Game attendance: 9,664
- Referee: Carl Chapman
- TV announcers (ESPN+): Drae Smith (play-by-play) and Chris Sammarone (analyst)

Game information
First quarter
- (10:48) MUR – Lucas Desjardins 32-yard pass from Tim Ogle, Jack Tannehill kick (Drive: 9 plays, 75 yards, 4:12; Murray State 7–0)
- (7:03) YSU – Beau Brungard 5-yard run, Andrew Lastovka kick (Drive: 7 plays, 56 yards, 3:41; Tied 7–7)

Second quarter

- (10:32) YSU – Ethan Wright 1-yard run, Andrew Lastovka kick (Drive: 15 plays, 91 yards, 7:51; Youngstown State 14–7)
- (5:39) YSU – Kylon Wilson 62-yard pass from Beau Brungard, Andrew Lastovka kick (Drive: 5 plays, 72 yards, 2:47; Youngstown State 21–7)
- (0:06) YSU – Andrew Lastovka 34-yard field goal (Drive: 10 plays, 75 yards, 2:58; Youngstown State 24–7)

Third quarter

- (12:08) YSU – Beau Brungard 50-yard pass from Fresh Walter, Andrew Lastovka kick (Drive: 6 plays, 76 yards, 2:45; Youngstown State 31–7)
- (7:00) YSU – Beau Brungard 1-yard run, Andrew Lastovka kick (Drive: 9 plays, 62 yards, 4:16; Youngstown State 38–7)

Fourth quarter

- (13:34) MUR – Jack Tannehill 38-yard field goal (Drive: 7 plays, 40 yards, 3:41; Youngstown State 38–10)
- (13:15) YSU – Kylon Wilson 100-yard kickoff return, Andrew Lastovka kick (Youngstown State 45–10)
- (11:22) MUR – Cam Bulluck 17-yard pass from Baxter Wright, Jack Tannehill kick (Drive: 5 plays, 48 yards, 1:45; Youngstown State 45–17)
- (7:04) YSU – Max Tomczak 2-yard pass from Beau Brungard, Jonathan Schmidt kick failed (Drive: 8 plays, 62 yards, 4:12; Youngstown State 51–17)

| Statistics | MUR | YSU |
|---|---|---|
| First downs | 15 | 26 |
| Total yards | 271 | 539 |
| Rushing yards | 79 | 241 |
| Passing yards | 192 | 298 |
| Passing: Comp–Att–Int | 19–29–1 | 23–27–0 |
| Time of possession | 24:14 | 35:46 |

| Team | Category | Player | Statistics |
|---|---|---|---|
| Murray State | Passing | Jim Ogle | 11/20, 102 yards, TD, INT |
| Murray State | Rushing | Baxter Wright | 7 carries, 30 yards |
| Murray State | Receiving | Lucas Desjardins | 3 receptions, 47 yards, TD |
| Youngstown State | Passing | Beau Brungard | 22/25, 248 yards, 2 TD |
| Youngstown State | Rushing | Beau Brungard | 15 carries, 64 yards, 2 TD |
| Youngstown State | Receiving | Kylon Wilson | 5 receptions, 89 yards, TD |

=== No. 16 Southern Illinois ===
No. 16 Southern Illinois Salukis (5–3) vs. Murray State Racers (0–8) – Game summary

| Quarter | 1 | 2 | 3 | 4 | Total |
|---|---|---|---|---|---|
| No. 16 Salukis | 7 | 10 | 3 | 7 | 27 |
| Racers | 0 | 7 | 0 | 0 | 7 |

at Roy Stewart Stadium, Murray, KY

- Date: November 1, 2025
- Game time: 4:00 p.m.
- Game weather: Sunny
- Game attendance: 8,506
- Referee: Gregory Gompf
- TV: ESPN+

Game information
First quarter
- (7:30) SIU – DJ Williams 1-yard run, Paul Geelen kick (Drive: 15 plays, 72 yards, 7:23; Southern Illinois 7–0)

Second quarter

- (8:29) SIU – Paul Geelen 23-yard field goal (Drive: 7 plays, 31 yards, 3:33; Southern Illinois 10–0)
- (3:56) SIU – DJ Williams 5-yard run, Paul Geelen kick (Drive: 7 plays, 59 yards, 3:50; Southern Illinois 17–0)
- (0:27) MUR – J'Kalon Carter 5-yard pass from Jim Ogle, Jack Tannehill kick (Drive: 12 plays, 75 yards, 3:29; Southern Illinois 17–7)

Third quarter

- (5:33) SIU – Paul Geelen 35-yard field goal (Drive: 9 plays, 50 yards, 3:22; Southern Illinois 20–7)

Fourth quarter

- (12:22) SIU – Lem Wash 40-yard pass from DJ Williams, Paul Geelen kick (Drive: 6 plays, 80 yards, 3:12; Southern Illinois 27–7)

| Statistics | SIU | MUR |
|---|---|---|
| First downs | 23 | 29 |
| Total yards | 404 | 300 |
| Rushing yards | 233 | 178 |
| Passing yards | 171 | 122 |
| Passing: Comp–Att–Int | 11–20–0 | 15–28–2 |
| Time of possession | 35:41 | 24:19 |

| Team | Category | Player | Statistics |
|---|---|---|---|
| Southern Illinois | Passing | DJ Williams | 11/20, 171 yards, TD |
| Southern Illinois | Rushing | Edward Robinson | 18 carries, 109 yards |
| Southern Illinois | Receiving | Lem Wash | 2 receptions, 79 yards, TD |
| Murray State | Passing | Jim Ogle | 14/26, 124 yards, TD, INT |
| Murray State | Rushing | Jawaun Washington | 16 carries, 81 yards |
| Murray State | Receiving | J'Kalon Carter | 6 receptions, 61 yards, TD |

=== at Northern Iowa ===
Murray State Racers (0–9) vs. Northern Iowa Panthers (2–7) – Game summary

| Quarter | 1 | 2 | 3 | 4 | Total |
|---|---|---|---|---|---|
| Racers | 0 | 14 | 0 | 0 | 14 |
| Panthers | 7 | 7 | 7 | 10 | 31 |

at UNI-Dome, Cedar Falls, IA

- Date: November 8
- Game time: 1:00 p.m.
- Game weather: Indoors • Temperature: 72 °F (22 °C)
- Game attendance: 8,529
- Referee: John Shay
- TV: ESPN+

Game information
First quarter
- (0:11) UNI – Bill Jackson 2-yard run, Max Bartachek kick (Drive: 6 plays, 38 yards, 2:50; Northern Iowa 7–0)

Second quarter

- (12:53) MUR – Darius Cannon 54-yard pass from Kaleb Bailey, Jack Tannehill kick (Drive: 5 plays, 75 yards, 2:18; Tied 7–7)
- (10:22) UNI – Bill Jackson 35-yard run, Max Bartachek kick (Drive: 4 plays, 79 yards, 2:25; Northern Iowa 14–7)
- (3:30) MUR – Jawaun Northington 12-yard run, Jack Tannehill kick (Drive: 13 plays, 99 yards, 6:52; Tied 14–14)

Third quarter

- (2:08) UNI – JC Roque Jr. 7-yard pass from Jaxon Dailey, Max Bartachek kick (Drive: 12 plays, 86 yards, 6:50; Northern Iowa 21–14)

Fourth quarter

- (11:55) UNI – Max Bartachek 45-yard field goal (Drive: 5 plays, 29 yards, 2:15; Northern Iowa 24–14
- (6:50) UNI – Bill Jackson 14-yard run, Max Bartachek kick (Drive: 7 plays, 50 yards, 4:05; Northern Iowa 31–14)

| Statistics | MUR | UNI |
|---|---|---|
| First downs | 19 | 23 |
| Total yards | 356 | 440 |
| Rushing yards | 197 | 307 |
| Passing yards | 159 | 133 |
| Passing: Comp–Att–Int | 13–21–1 | 8–11–0 |
| Time of possession | 27:05 | 32:55 |

| Team | Category | Player | Statistics |
|---|---|---|---|
| Murray State | Passing | Kaleb Bailey | 5/12, 113 yards, TD, INT |
| Murray State | Rushing | Kaleb Bailey | 21 carries, 96 yards |
| Murray State | Receiving | Darius Cannon | 4 receptions, 77 yards, TD |
| Northern Iowa | Passing | Jaxon Dailey | 8/11, 133 yards, TD |
| Northern Iowa | Rushing | Bill Jackson | 18 carries, 143 yards, 3 TD |
| Northern Iowa | Receiving | JC Roque Jr. | 4 receptions, 50 yards, TD |

=== No. 13 North Dakota ===
No. 13 North Dakota (6–4) vs. Murray State Racers (0–10) – Game summary

| Quarter | 1 | 2 | 3 | 4 | Total |
|---|---|---|---|---|---|
| No. 13 Fighting Hawks | 7 | 0 | 14 | 14 | 35 |
| Racers | 0 | 9 | 0 | 8 | 17 |

at Roy Stewart Stadium, Murray, KY

- Date: November 15
- Game time: 11:00 am
- Game weather: Sunny • Temperature: 72 °F (22 °C) • Wind: NE at 16 miles per hour (26 km/h)
- Game attendance: 6,783
- Referee: Tyler Downs
- TV: Midco Sports/ESPN+

Game information
First quarter
- (11:02) UND – B.J. Fleming 15-yard pass from Jerry Kaminski, Kenten Laughman kick (Drive: 10 plays, 91 yards, 5:27; North Dakota 7–0)

Second quarter

- (13:17) MUR – Jack Tannehill 33-yard field goal (Drive: 14 plays, 58 yards, 7:11; North Dakota 7–3)
- (6:10) MUR – Jack Tannehill 36-yard field goal (Drive: 11 plays, 31 yards, 6:21; North Dakota 7–6)
- (0:03) MUR – Jack Tannehill 41-yard field goal (Drive: 7 plays, 39 yards, 1:04; Murray State 9–7)

Third quarter

- (10:17) UND – Sawyer Seidl 3-yard run, Kenten Laughman kick (Drive: 12 plays, 61 yards, 4:37; North Dakota 14–9)
- (6:56) UND – Jonnie Wiltshire 30-yard interception, Kenten Laughman kick (North Dakota 21–9)

Fourth quarter

- (10:22) UND – Colton Brunell 1-yard run, Kenten Laughman kick (Drive: 11 plays, 63 yards, 4:23; North Dakota 28–9)
- (5:54) MUR – Baxton Wright 8-yard run, J'Kalon Carter pass to Huseyin Simsir for two-point conversion (Drive: 11 plays, 63 yards, 4:23; North Dakota 28–17)
- (3:08) UND – Jerry Kaminski 28-yard run, Kenten Laughman kick (Drive: 5 plays, 47 yards, 2:45; North Dakota 35–17)

| Statistics | UND | MUR |
|---|---|---|
| First downs | 20 | 18 |
| Total yards | 344 | 252 |
| Rushing yards | 213 | 112 |
| Passing yards | 131 | 140 |
| Passing: Comp–Att–Int | 11–18–1 | 23–34–1 |
| Time of possession | 29:32 | 30:28 |

| Team | Category | Player | Statistics |
|---|---|---|---|
| North Dakota | Passing | Jerry Kaminski | 11/18, 131 yards, TD, INT |
| North Dakota | Rushing | Sawyer Seidl | 22 carries, 98 yards, TD |
| North Dakota | Receiving | B.J. Fleming | 4 receptions, 61 yards, TD |
| Murray State | Passing | Baxter Wright | 23/34, 140 yards, INT |
| Murray State | Rushing | Jawaun Northington | 11 carries, 56 yards |
| Murray State | Receiving | Darius Cannon | 8 receptions, 49 yards |

=== at Indiana State ===
Murray State Racers (0–11) vs. Indiana State Sycamores (3–8) – Game summary

| Quarter | 1 | 2 | 3 | 4 | Total |
|---|---|---|---|---|---|
| Racers | 7 | 10 | 7 | 7 | 31 |
| Sycamores | 7 | 0 | 3 | 7 | 17 |

at Memorial Stadium, Terre Haute, IN

- Date: November 22
- Game time: 12:00 p.m.
- Game weather: Sunny
- Game attendance: 8,529
- Referee: Grant Henderson
- TV: ESPN+

Game information
First quarter
- (12:30) INST – Rashad Rochelle 66-yard pass from Keegan Patterson, Spencer Conrad kick (Drive: 1 play, 66 yards, 0:12; Indiana State 7–0)
- (10:35) MUR – Jawaun Northington 14-yard run, Jack Tannehill kick (Drive: 5 plays, 77 yards, 1:49; Tied 7–7)

Second quarter

- (4:03) MUR – Jawaun Northington 14-yard run, Jack Tannehill kick (Drive: 14 plays, 96 yards, 6:08; Murray State 14–7)
- (0:13) MUR – Jack Tannehill 26-yard field goal (Drive: 11 plays, 80 yards, 2:40; Murray State 17–7)

Third quarter

- (11:05) INST – Spencer Conrad 27-yard field goal (Drive: 11 plays, 66 yards, 3:55; Murray State 17–10)
- (9:36) MUR – Jordan Washington 6-yard run, Jack Tannehill kick (Drive: 4 plays, 57 yards, 1:22; Murray State 24–10)

Fourth quarter

- (13:36) INST – Torey French 72-yard pass from Keegan Patterson, Spencer Conrad kick (Drive: 5 plays, 85 yards, 1:34; Murray State 24–17)
- (2:58) MUR – J'Kalon Carer 6-yard pass from Baxter Wright, Jack Tannehill kick (Drive: 10 plays, 88 yards, 6:05; Murray State 31–17)

| Statistics | MUR | INST |
|---|---|---|
| First downs | 28 | 19 |
| Total yards | 564 | 481 |
| Rushing yards | 284 | 167 |
| Passing yards | 280 | 314 |
| Passing: Comp–Att–Int | 23–31–0 | 17–28–1 |
| Time of possession | 33:47 | 26:13 |

| Team | Category | Player | Statistics |
|---|---|---|---|
| Murray State | Passing | Baxter Wright | 22/30, 253 yards, TD |
| Murray State | Rushing | Jawaun Northington | 32 carries, 232 yards, 2 TD |
| Murray State | Receiving | Darius Cannon | 9 receptions, 110 yards |
| Indiana State | Passing | Keegan Patterson | 17/28, 314 yards, 2 TD, INT |
| Indiana State | Rushing | Deion Browns | 19 carries, 78 yards |
| Indiana State | Receiving | Rashad Rochelle | 5 receptions, 120 yards, TD |
