= 2025 Missouri Valley Football Conference season =

American college football conference season

- League: NCAA Division I Football Championship Subdivision
- Sport: Football
- Duration: August 28, 2025 through January 5, 2026
- Teams: 10
- TV partner(s): ESPN College Football, ESPN+, Local TV partners

2026 NFL draft
- Top draft pick: Bryce Lance, WR, North Dakota State
- Picked by: New Orleans Saints (round 4, pick 136)

Regular season
- Champion Playoff participants: North Dakota State South Dakota; South Dakota State; Youngstown State; Illinois State; North Dakota

Football seasons
- 2024 2026

2025 Missouri Valley Football Conference standings
	Conf.			Overall
Team	W		L	W		L
No. 4т North Dakota State $^	8	–	0	12	–	1
No. 9 South Dakota ^	6	–	2	10	–	5
No. 2 Illinois State ^	5	–	3	12	–	5
No. 14 North Dakota ^	5	–	3	8	–	6
No. 18 Youngstown State ^	5	–	3	8	–	5
No. 13 South Dakota State ^	4	–	4	9	–	5
No. 25 Southern Illinois	4	–	4	7	–	5
Northern Iowa	1	–	7	3	–	9
Murray State	1	–	7	1	–	11
Indiana State	1	–	7	3	–	9
$ – Conference champion; ^ – FCS playoff participant; Rankings from STATS Poll

The 2025 Missouri Valley Football Conference season was the 40th season of college football play for the Missouri Valley Football Conference and part of the 2025 NCAA Division I FCS football season. This was the MVFC's first season dropping to 10 teams since the 2019 season, and will be the last for now.

Illinois State made it to the National Championship as the first FCS team ever to win four playoff road games. They were defeated in the title game by Montana State. South Dakota made the playoffs as the 11th seed and was able to make the quarterfinals before falling to 3rd seeded Montana. North Dakota State (1st seed) and South Dakota State (14th seed) both lost in the second round of the playoffs, to Illinois State and Montana respectively. This was the first year that NDSU made the playoffs but did not manage to reach the quarterfinal round. North Dakota also made it to the second round after playing on the road in the first round, but they fell on the road to Tarleton State to end their postseason. Youngstown State made the playoffs as well, but lost to Yale at home in the first round.

== Conference changes ==
After the conclusion of the 2024 college football season, Missouri State left the conference to reclassify to the Football Bowl Subdivision (FBS) and move to Conference USA after 39 years in the league as a charter member. This move matches the Bears' departure from MVFC's sister conference, the Missouri Valley Conference (MVC), which they also left after the 2024–25 collegiate season.

Later, on May 5, 2025, the conference announced a new governance structure to begin on July 1, 2025 that placed MVC commissioner Jeff Jackson as the next MVFC commissioner following Patty Viverito's retirement on June 30. It also placed Summit League commissioner Josh Fenton as an executive advisor to the conference. The new structure formalized the decades-long unofficial ties between the MVC and MVFC, and also established a formal relationship between the MVFC and Summit.

== Coaching changes ==
=== North Dakota ===
On December 8, 2024, Eric Schmidt was named the next head coach at North Dakota. Schmidt takes over for Bubba Schweigert, who stepped down after the 2024 season.

=== Northern Iowa ===
On December 3, 2024, Todd Stepsis was named the new head coach at Northern Iowa. Stepsis takes over for longtime coach Mark Farley, who retired after the 2024 season.

=== South Dakota ===
On January 16, 2025, Travis Johansen was named the next head coach at South Dakota. Johansen steps in for Bob Nielson, who retired after the 2024 season.

=== South Dakota State ===
On December 31, 2024, Dan Jackson was named the next head coach at South Dakota State. Jackson was hired after Jimmy Rogers left the program to become the next head coach at Washington State.

== Preseason ==
=== League poll ===
The annual preseason poll; voted on by conference coaches, athletic directors, and media members.

Predicted finish	Team	Points (First place votes)
1	North Dakota State	417 (39)
2	South Dakota State	355
3	South Dakota	349 (3)
4	Illinois State	292
5	Youngstown State	211
6	Southern Illinois	208
7	North Dakota	196
8	Northern Iowa	130
9	Indiana State	105
10	Murray State	47

=== Individual awards ===
In a departure from seasons past, the MVFC released a player "watch-list" that was voted on by the league's athletic directors, coaches, and media members.

Category	Player	School	Position
Offense	Aidan Bouman	South Dakota	QB
Offense	Beau Brungard	Youngstown State	QB
Offense	Chase Mason	South Dakota State	QB
Offense	Jim Ogle	Murray State	QB
Offense	Elijah Owens	Indiana State	QB
Offense	Cole Payton	North Dakota State	QB
Offense	Tommy Rittenhouse	Illinois State	QB
Offense	D J Williams	Southern Illinois	QB
Offense	Barika Kpeenu	North Dakota State	RB
Offense	Plez Lawrence	Indiana State	RB
Offense	Julius Loughridge	South Dakota State	RB
Offense	Jawaun Northington	Murray State	RB
Offense	Charles Pierre Jr	South Dakota	RB
Offense	Sawyer Seidl	North Dakota	RB
Offense	Wenkers Wright	Illinois State	RB
Offense	Ethan Wright	Youngstown State	RB
Offense	Gaven Ziebarth	North Dakota	RB
Offense	Truman Werremeyer	North Dakota State	RB (FB)
Offense	Scotty Presson Jr	Illinois State	TE (FB)
Offense	Derek Anderson	Northern Iowa	TE
Offense	Austin Bray	Youngstown State	TE
Offense	Javon Charles	Illinois State	TE
Offense	Dallas Holmes	South Dakota	TE
Offense	Aidan Quinn	Southern Illinois	TE
Offense	Lance Rees	Indiana State	TE
Offense	Ryan Schwendeman	Southern Illinois	TE
Offense	Blake Anderson	Northern Iowa	OL
Offense	Seth Anderson	North Dakota	OL
Offense	Liam Becher	North Dakota	OL
Offense	Ben Buxa	North Dakota	OL
Offense	Quinten Christensen	South Dakota State	OL
Offense	Cam Dye	Southern Illinois	OL
Offense	Griffin Empey	North Dakota State	OL
Offense	Noah Fenske	Southern Illinois	OL
Offense	Trent Fraley	North Dakota State	OL
Offense	Sam Hagen	South Dakota State	OL
Offense	Adrian Hawkins	South Dakota	OL
Offense	Keean Kamerling	Northern Iowa	OL
Offense	Van Keen	Youngstown State	OL
Offense	Desmeal Leigh	Youngstown State	OL
Offense	Jake Pope	Illinois State	OL
Offense	Landon Woodard	Illinois State	OL
Offense	J K Carter	Murray State	WR
Offense	Vinson Davis III	Southern Illinois	WR
Offense	Jaiden Ellis-Lahey	Northern Iowa	WR
Offense	Isaiah Garcia-Castaneda	South Dakota State	WR
Offense	Eddie Kasper	Illinois State	WR
Offense	Tysen Kershaw	Northern Iowa	WR
Offense	Bryce Lance	North Dakota State	WR
Offense	Lofton O'Groske	South Dakota State	WR
Offense	Rashad Rochelle	Indiana State	WR
Offense	J C Roque Jr	Northern Iowa	WR
Offense	Daniel Sobkowicz	Indiana State	WR
Offense	Mike Solomon	Youngstown State	WR
Offense	Max Tomczak	Youngstown State	WR
Offense	Ky Wilson	Youngstown State	WR
Defense	Jake Anderson	Illinois State	DL
Defense	Toby Anene	North Dakota State	DL
Defense	Kobe Clayborne	South Dakota State	DL
Defense	Caden Crawford	South Dakota	DL
Defense	Jaxon Duttenhefer	North Dakota State	DL
Defense	Nick Kessler	Illinois State	DL
Defense	Reis Kirschenman	South Dakota State	DL
Defense	Jack Kriebs	Northern Iowa	DL
Defense	Owen Ostroski	Northern Iowa	DL
Defense	Franz Reisz	Northern Iowa	DL
Defense	Jackson Stort	Northern Iowa	DL
Defense	Michael Voitus	Youngstown State	DL
Defense	Donnie Wingate	Southern Illinois	DL
Defense	Colin Bohanek	Southern Illinois	LB
Defense	Nate Ewell	South Dakota	LB
Defense	Logan Kopp	North Dakota State	LB
Defense	Tucker Langenberg	Northern Iowa	LB
Defense	Lucas McAllister	Indiana State	LB
Defense	Malachi McNeal	North Dakota	LB
Defense	Tye Niekamp	Illinois State	LB
Defense	Joe Ollman	South Dakota State	LB
Defense	Chris Presto	Southern Illinois	LB
Defense	Lance Rucker	North Dakota	LB
Defense	Braxton Sampson	Indiana State	LB
Defense	Chase Van Tol	South Dakota State	LB
Defense	Mike Wells	Youngstown State	LB
Defense	Dallas Westhoff	Indiana State	LB
Defense	Preston Zandier	Youngstown State	LB
Defense	Koby Bretz	South Dakota State	DB
Defense	Jonathan Cabral-Martin	Northern Iowa	DB
Defense	Anthony Chideme-Alfaro	North Dakota State	DB
Defense	Kimal Clark	Indiana State	DB
Defense	Jailen Duffie	North Dakota State	DB
Defense	Darius Givance	North Dakota State	DB
Defense	D J Harris	Youngstown State	DB
Defense	Ryan Jones	North Dakota State	DB
Defense	Zach Lewis	North Dakota	DB
Defense	Jeremiah McClendon	Southern Illinois	DB
Defense	Shadwell Nkuba	Illinois State	DB
Defense	Jayden Oliver	South Dakota State	DB
Defense	Michael Olowo	Northern Iowa	DB
Defense	Makahi Shahid	Youngstown State	DB
Defense	Jorge Valdes	Indiana State	DB
Defense	Tim White	South Dakota	DB
Special Teams	Ryan Algrim	Southern Illinois	LS
Special Teams	Caleb Bowers	South Dakota	LS
Special Teams	Dylan Calabrese	Illinois State	LS
Special Teams	Byron Floyd	Youngstown State	LS
Special Teams	Kaydon Olivia	South Dakota State	LS
Special Teams	Hayden Futch	Illinois State	P
Special Teams	Paul Geelen	Southern Illinois	P
Special Teams	Brendon Kilpatrick	Youngstown State	P
Special Teams	Tom O'Hara	Murray State	P
Special Teams	Harry Traum	Indiana State	P
Special Teams	Paul Geelen	Southern Illinois	PK
Special Teams	Andrew Lastovka	Youngstown State	PK
Special Teams	Will Leyland	South Dakota	PK
Special Teams	RaJa Nelson	North Dakota State	RS
Special Teams	Jackson Williams	North Dakota State	RS

== Rankings ==
Legend
	Improvement in ranking
	Drop in ranking
	Not ranked previous week
	No change in ranking from previous week
RV	Received votes but were not ranked in Top 25 of poll
т	Tied with team above or below also with this symbol

		Pre	Wk 1	Wk 2	Wk 3	Wk 4	Wk 5	Wk 6	Wk 7	Wk 8	Wk 9	Wk 10	Wk 11	Wk 12	Wk 13	Final
Illinois State	STATS	6	7	7	6	7	6	9	10	18	17	16	14	11	17т	2
Illinois State	Coaches	6	7	4	4	5	6	10	9	20	18	17	13	11т	17	2
Indiana State	STATS															
Indiana State	Coaches			RV												
Murray State	STATS															
Murray State	Coaches															
North Dakota	STATS	RV	20	16	16	14	15	13	9	8	8	13	13	13	19	14
North Dakota	Coaches	RV	22	17	17	15т	14	12	11	10	10	15	18	16	23	16
North Dakota State	STATS	1	1	1	1	1	1	1	1	1	1	1	1	1	1	4т
North Dakota State	Coaches	1	1	1	1	1	1	1	1	1	1	1	1	1	1	5
Northern Iowa	STATS															
Northern Iowa	Coaches	RV	RV	RV	RV											
South Dakota	STATS	4	4	12	15	17	21	23	22	21	RV	22	17	16	12	9
South Dakota	Coaches	5	6	20	21	18	RV	RV	RV	RV	RV	25	22	21	20	11
South Dakota State	STATS	3	2	2	2	2	2	2	2	2	4т	8	16	22	16	13
South Dakota State	Coaches	3	2	2	2	2	2	2	2	2	5	9	15	22	18	14
Southern Illinois	STATS	20	14	17	13	11	10	8	12	16	16	15	21	24	23	25
Southern Illinois	Coaches	20	15	14	11	12	11	9	12	18	17	16	23	RV	25	RV
Youngstown State	STATS	RV	RV	RV	RV	24	24	RV	RV	22	18	21	20	18	14	18
Youngstown State	Coaches	RV	RV	25	24	19	18	20	25	21	19	22	19	17	13	17

== Schedule ==
Index to colors and formatting
MVFC member won
MVFC member lost
MVFC teams in **bold**

All times Central time.

† denotes Homecoming game
^ denotes AP Poll ranking for FBS teams

=== Regular season schedule ===
==== Week 1 ====
Date	Time	Visiting team	Home team	Site	TV	Result	Attendance	Ref.
August 28	5:00 PM	McKendree	**Indiana State**	Memorial Stadium • Terre Haute, IN	ESPN+	**W** 41–24	3,206	
August 28	5:00 PM	Mercyhurst	No. RV **Youngstown State**	Stambaugh Stadium • Youngstown, OH	ESPN+	**W** 24–15	7,040	
August 30	11:00 AM	No. 1 **North Dakota State**	The Citadel	Johnson Hagood Stadium • Charleston, SC	ESPN+	**W** 38–0	10,691	
August 30	1:00 PM	Butler	**Northern Iowa**	UNI-Dome • Cedar Falls, IA	ESPN+	**W** 38–14	9,079	
August 30	2:30 PM	No. 4 **South Dakota**	No. 22^ Iowa State	Jack Trice Stadium • Ames, IA	FOX	**L** 7–55	61,500	
August 30	4:30 PM	**Murray State**	East Tennessee State	William B. Greene Jr. Stadium • Johnson City, TN	ESPN+	**L** 17–45	9,122	
August 30	5:00 PM	No. 6 **Illinois State**	No. 18^ Oklahoma	Gaylord Family Oklahoma Memorial Stadium • Norman, OK	ESPN+	**L** 35–3	83,218	
August 30	6:00 PM	No. RV **North Dakota**	No. 17^ Kansas State	Bill Snyder Family Stadium • Manhattan, KS	ESPN+	**L** 38–35	51,927	
August 30	6:00 PM	No. 15 Sacramento State	No. 3 **South Dakota State**	Dana J. Dykhouse Stadium • Brookings, SD	ESPN+	**W** 20–3	19,163	
August 30	6:00 PM	Thomas More	No. 20 **Southern Illinois**	Saluki Stadium • Carbondale, IL	ESPN+	**W** 49–3	6,585	
^{#}Rankings from Stats Perform. All times are in Central Time.

==== Week 2 ====
Date	Time	Visiting team	Home team	Site	TV	Result	Attendance	Ref.
September 6	12:00 PM	Eastern Illinois	**Indiana State**	Memorial Stadium • Terre Haute, IN	ESPN+	**W** 38–14	5,281	
September 6	1:00 PM	Robert Morris	No. RV **Youngstown State**	Stambaugh Stadium • Youngstown, OH	ESPN+	**W** 56–17	12,042	
September 6	1:30 PM	No. 1 **North Dakota State**	No. RV Tennessee State	Nissan Stadium • Nashville, TN	ESPN+	**W** 59–3	8,569	
September 6	3:00 PM	**Northern Iowa**	Wyoming	War Memorial Stadium • Laramie, WY	Altitude2	**L** 7–31	25,009	
September 6	6:00 PM	Morehead State	No. 7 **Illinois State**	Hancock Stadium • Normal, IL	ESPN+	**W** 41–13	N/A	
September 6	6:00 PM	No. 4 **South Dakota**	Lamar	Provost Umphrey Stadium • Beaumont, TX	ESPN+	**L** 13–20	6,043	
September 6	6:00 PM	Southeastern Louisiana	**Murray State**	Roy Stewart Stadium • Murray, KY	ESPN+	**L** 24–45	15,027	
September 6	6:00 PM	Portland State	No. 20 **North Dakota**	Alerus Center • Grand Forks, ND	ESPN+	**W** 50–20	11,469	
September 6	6:30 PM	No. 14 **Southern Illinois**	Purdue	Ross-Ade Stadium • West Lafayette, IN	BTN	**L** 17–34	54,663	
September 6	7:00 PM	No. 2 **South Dakota State**	No. 3 Montana State	Bobcat Stadium • Bozeman, MT	ESPN+	**W** 30–24^{2OT}	22,117	
^{#}Rankings from Stats Perform. All times are in Central Time.

==== Week 3 ====
Date	Time	Visiting team	Home team	Site	TV	Result	Attendance	Ref.
September 12	6:30 PM	**Indiana State**	No. 22^ Indiana	Memorial Stadium • Bloomington, IN	BTN	**L** 0–73	46,219	
September 13	1:00 PM	Northern Colorado	No. 12 **South Dakota**	DakotaDome • Vermillion, SD	ESPN+	**W** 24–17^{OT}	6,445	
September 13	2:00 PM	No. 7 **Illinois State**	Eastern Illinois	O'Brien Field • Charleston, IL (Mid-America Classic)	ESPN+	**W** 42–30	6,720	
September 13	2:00 PM	No. 16 **North Dakota**	No. 5 Montana	Washington–Grizzly Stadium • Missoula, MT	ESPN+	**L** 23–24	26,492	
September 13	2:30 PM	No. RV **Youngstown State**	Michigan State	Spartan Stadium • East Lansing, MI	BTN	**L** 24–41	71,301	
September 13	2:30 PM	No. RV Southeast Missouri State	No. 1 **North Dakota State**	Fargodome • Fargo, ND	ESPN+	**W** 41–14	17,354	
September 13	4:00 PM	Eastern Washington	**Northern Iowa**	UNI-Dome • Cedar Falls, IA	ESPN+	**W** 17–14	10,774	
September 13	6:00 PM	**Murray State**	Georgia State	Center Parc Stadium • Atlanta, GA	ESPN+	**L** 21–37	13,988	
September 13	6:00 PM	Drake	No. 2 **South Dakota State**	Dana J. Dykhouse Stadium • Brookings, SD	ESPN+	**W** 37–21	19,213	
September 13	6:00 PM	No. 17 **Southern Illinois**	No. RV UT Martin	Graham Stadium • Martin, TN	ESPN+	**W** 37–10	5,402	
^{#}Rankings from Stats Perform. All times are in Central Time.

==== Week 4 ====
Date	Time	Visiting team	Home team	Site	TV	Result	Attendance	Ref.
September 20	12:00 PM	North Alabama	No. 6 **Illinois State**	Hancock Stadium • Normal, IL	ESPN+	**W** 38–36^{2OT}	11,287	
September 20	1:00 PM	Drake	No. 15 **South Dakota**	DakotaDome • Vermillion, SD	ESPN+	**W** 42–21	7,441	
September 20	2:00 PM	**Indiana State**	No. 5 Montana	Washington–Grizzly Stadium • Missoula, MT	ESPN+	**L** 20–63	26,193	
September 20	3:00 PM	Valparaiso	No. 16 **North Dakota**†	Alerus Center • Grand Forks, ND	ESPN+	**W** 58–7	11,424	
September 20	5:00 PM	No. RV **Youngstown State**	Towson	Johnny Unitas Stadium • Towson, MD	FloSports	**W** 31–28	6,042	
September 20	6:00 PM	**Murray State**	Jacksonville State	AmFirst Stadium • Jacksonville, AL	ESPN+	**L** 10–45	21,426	
September 20	6:00 PM	No. 13 **Southern Illinois**	No. RV Southeast Missouri State	Houck Stadium • Cape Girardeau, MO (War for the Wheel)	ESPN+	**W** 59–31	8,050	
September 20	7:00 PM	**Northern Iowa**	Utah Tech	Greater Zion Stadium • St. George, UT	ESPN+	**L** 9–20	4,784	
^{#}Rankings from Stats Perform. All times are in Central Time.

Date	Bye Week	
September 20	No. 1 North Dakota State	No. 2 South Dakota State

==== Week 5 ====
Date	Time	Visiting team	Home team	Site	TV	Result	Attendance	Ref.
September 27	1:00 PM	No. 17 **South Dakota**	No. 1 **North Dakota State**†	Fargodome • Fargo, ND	ESPN+	**NDSU** 51–13	18,498	
September 27	2:00 PM	Mercyhurst	No. 2 **South Dakota State**	Dana J. Dykhouse Stadium • Brookings, SD	ESPN+	**W** 51–7	19,034	
^{#}Rankings from Stats Perform. All times are in Central Time.

Date	Bye Week						
September 27	No. 7 Illinois State	Indiana State	Murray State	No. 14 North Dakota	Northern Iowa	No. 11 Southern Illinois	No. 24 Youngstown State

==== Week 6 ====
Date	Time	Visiting team	Home team	Site	TV	Result	Attendance	Ref.
October 4	2:00 PM	**Murray State**	No. 21 **South Dakota**	DakotaDome • Vermillion, SD	ESPN+	**USD** 49–24	7,953	
October 4	4:00 PM	No. 15 **North Dakota**	**Northern Iowa**	UNI-Dome • Cedar Falls, IA	ESPN+	**UND** 35–7	12,048	
October 4	5:00 PM	No. 2 **South Dakota State**	No. 24 **Youngstown State**	Stambaugh Stadium • Youngstown, OH	ESPN+	**SDSU** 35–30	11,068	
October 4	6:00 PM	No. 1 **North Dakota State**	No. 6 **Illinois State**	Hancock Stadium • Normal, IL	ESPN+	**NDSU** 33–16	9,829	
October 4	6:00 PM	**Indiana State**	No. 10 **Southern Illinois**	Saluki Stadium • Carbondale, IL	ESPN+	**SIU** 55–27	10,132	
^{#}Rankings from Stats Perform. All times are in Central Time.

==== Week 7 ====
Date	Time	Visiting team	Home team	Site	TV	Result	Attendance	Ref.
October 11	12:00 PM	No. 23 **South Dakota**	**Indiana State**	Memorial Stadium • Terre Haute, IN	ESPN+	**USD** 19–14	5,373	
October 11	2:00 PM	**Northern Iowa**	No. 2 **South Dakota State**	Dana J. Dykhouse Stadium • Brookings, SD	ESPN+	**SDSU** 31–3	19,342	
October 11	2:30 PM	No. 8 **Southern Illinois**	No. 1 **North Dakota State**	Fargodome • Fargo, ND	ESPN+	**NDSU** 45–17	15,812	
October 11	3:00 PM	No. RV **Youngstown State**	No. 13 **North Dakota**	Alerus Center • Grand Forks, ND	ESPN+	**UND** 35–17	11,960	
October 11	6:00 PM	No. 9 **Illinois State**	**Murray State**	Roy Stewart Stadium • Murray, KY	ESPN+	**ILST** 46–32	5,647	
^{#}Rankings from Stats Perform. All times are in Central Time.

==== Week 8 ====
Date	Time	Visiting team	Home team	Site	TV	Result	Attendance	Ref.
October 18	12:00 PM	No. 1 **North Dakota State**	**Indiana State**	Memorial Stadium • Terre Haute, IN	ESPN+	**NDSU** 38–7	3,252	
October 18	1:00 PM	No. 2 **South Dakota State**	**Murray State**	Roy Stewart Stadium • Murray, KY	ESPN+	**SDSU** 35–14	6,746	
October 18	1:00 PM	No. 22 **South Dakota**	**Northern Iowa**	UNI-Dome • Cedar Falls, IA	ESPN+	**USD** 17–14	8,434	
October 18	2:00 PM	No. RV **Youngstown State**	No. 10 **Illinois State**†	Hancock Stadium • Normal, IL	ESPN+	**YSU** 40–35	9,834	
October 18	2:00 PM	No. 9 **North Dakota**	No. 12 **Southern Illinois**	Saluki Stadium • Carbondale, IL	ESPN+	**UND** 38–19	5,132	
^{#}Rankings from Stats Perform. All times are in Central Time.

==== Week 9 ====
Date	Time	Visiting team	Home team	Site	TV	Result	Attendance	Ref.
October 25	1:00 PM	No. 18 **Illinois State**	No. 21 **South Dakota**	DakotaDome • Vermillion, SD	ESPN+	**ILST** 21–13	6,333	
October 25	1:00 PM	**Murray State**	No. 22 **Youngstown State**	Stambaugh Stadium • Youngstown, OH	ESPN+	**YSU** 51–17	9,664	
October 25	2:00 PM	**Northern Iowa**	No. 16 **Southern Illinois**†	Saluki Stadium • Carbondale, IL	ESPN+	**SIU** 31–17	8,115	
October 25	3:00 PM	**Indiana State**	No. 8 **North Dakota**	Alerus Center • Grand Forks, ND	ESPN+	**UND** 46–17	10,618	
October 25	7:00 PM	No. 1 **North Dakota State**	No. 2 **South Dakota State**	Dana J. Dykhouse Stadium • Brookings, SD (Dakota Marker)	ESPNU	**NDSU** 38–7	19,477	
^{#}Rankings from Stats Perform. All times are in Central Time.

==== Week 10 ====
Date	Time	Visiting team	Home team	Site	TV	Result	Attendance	Ref.
November 1	1:00 PM	No. 8 **North Dakota**	No. RV **South Dakota**	DakotaDome • Vermillion, SD (Sitting Bull Trophy)	ESPN+	**USD** 26–21	6,809	
November 1	2:00 PM	**Northern Iowa**	No. 17 **Illinois State**	Hancock Stadium • Normal, IL	ESPN+	**ILST** 31–16	7,756	
November 1	2:00 PM	**Indiana State**	No. 4т **South Dakota State**	Dana J. Dykhouse Stadium • Brookings, SD	ESPN+	**INST** 24–12	15,842	
November 1	2:30 PM	No. 18 **Youngstown State**	No. 1 **North Dakota State**	Fargodome • Fargo, ND	ESPN+	**NDSU** 38–30	14,607	
November 1	4:00 PM	No. 16 **Southern Illinois**	**Murray State**†	Roy Stewart Stadium • Murray, KY	ESPN+	**SIU** 27–7	8,506	
^{#}Rankings from Stats Perform. All times are in Central Time.

==== Week 11 ====
Date	Time	Visiting team	Home team	Site	TV	Result	Attendance	Ref.
November 8	12:00 PM	No. 16 **Illinois State**	**Indiana State**	Memorial Stadium • Terre Haute, IN	ESPN+	**ILST** 52–20	3,202	
November 8	1:00 PM	No. 1 **North Dakota State**	No. 13 **North Dakota**	Alerus Center • Grand Forks, ND (Nickel Trophy)	ESPN+	**NDSU** 15–10	12,749	
November 8	1:00 PM	**Murray State**	**Northern Iowa**	UNI-Dome • Cedar Falls, IA	ESPN+	**UNI** 31–14	8,529	
November 8	1:00 PM	No. 15 **Southern Illinois**	No. 21 **Youngstown State**	Stambaugh Stadium • Youngstown, OH	ESPN+	**YSU** 48–38	8,448	
November 8	3:00 PM	No. 8 **South Dakota State**	No. 22 **South Dakota**	DakotaDome • Vermillion, SD (rivalry)	ESPNU	**USD** 24–17	9,159	
^{#}Rankings from Stats Perform. All times are in Central Time.

==== Week 12 ====
Date	Time	Visiting team	Home team	Site	TV	Result	Attendance	Ref.
November 15	11:00 AM	No. 13 **North Dakota**	**Murray State**	Roy Stewart Stadium • Murray, KY	ESPN+	**UND** 35–17	6,783	
November 15	11:00 AM	**Indiana State**	No. 20 **Youngstown State**	Stambaugh Stadium • Youngstown, OH	ESPN+	**YSU** 48–29	7,392	
November 15	12:00 PM	No. 17 **South Dakota**	No. 21 **Southern Illinois**	Saluki Stadium • Carbondale, IL	ESPN+	**USD** 53–51^{5OT}	5,622	
November 15	2:00 PM	No. 14 **Illinois State**	No. 16 **South Dakota State**	Dana J. Dykhouse Stadium • Brookings, SD	ESPN+	**ILST** 35–21	11,407	
November 15	2:30 PM	**Northern Iowa**	No. 1 **North Dakota State**	Fargodome • Fargo, ND	ESPN+	**NDSU** 48–16	14,736	
^{#}Rankings from Stats Perform. All times are in Central Time.

==== Week 13 ====
Date	Time	Visiting team	Home team	Site	TV	Result	Attendance	Ref.
November 22	12:00 PM	No. 24 **Southern Illinois**	No. 11 **Illinois State**	Hancock Stadium • Normal, IL	ESPN+	**SIU** 37–7	6,895	
November 22	12:00 PM	**Murray State**	**Indiana State**	Memorial Stadium • Terre Haute, IN	ESPN+	**MUST** 31–17	2,834	
November 22	1:00 PM	No. 22 **South Dakota State**	No. 13 **North Dakota**	Alerus Center • Grand Forks, ND	ESPN+	**SDSU** 34–31^{OT}	11,396	
November 22	1:00 PM	No. 18 **Youngstown State**	**Northern Iowa**	UNI-Dome • Cedar Falls, IA	ESPN+	**YSU** 35–32	7,361	
November 22	2:30 PM	St. Thomas	No. 1 **North Dakota State**	Fargodome • Fargo, ND	ESPN+	**W** 62–7	15,278	
^{#}Rankings from Stats Perform. All times are in Central Time.

Date	Bye Week
November 22	No. 16 South Dakota

=== FCS playoffs ===
In 2025, six teams made the FCS playoffs. North Dakota State (No. 1) received a first round bye; South Dakota (No. 11), South Dakota State (No. 14), Youngstown State (No. 15), Illinois State, and North Dakota played in the first round. Below are the games in which they played.

Index to colors and formatting
MVFC member won
MVFC member lost
MVFC teams in **bold**

All times Central time, seedings in parentheses.

==== First round ====
Date	Time	Visiting team	Home team	Site	TV	Result	Attendance	Ref.
November 29	11:00 AM	No. 24 Yale (Ivy League)	No. 14 (15) **Youngstown State**	Stambaugh Stadium • Youngstown, OH	ESPN+	**L** 42–43	4,869	
November 29	12:00 PM	No. RV Drake (PFL)	No. 12 (11) **South Dakota**	DakotaDome • Vermillion, SD	ESPN+	**W** 38–17	3,964	
November 29	12:00 PM	No. 22 New Hampshire (CAA)	No. 16 (14) **South Dakota State**	Dana J. Dykhouse Stadium • Brookings, SD	ESPN+	**W** 41–3	3,843	
November 29	12:00 PM	No. 17т **Illinois State**	No. 17т (16) Southeastern Louisiana (Southland)	Strawberry Stadium • Hammond, LA	ESPN+	**W** 21–3	3,321	
November 29	12:00 PM	No. 19 **North Dakota**	No. 6 (13) Tennessee Tech (OVC–Big South)	Tucker Stadium • Cookeville, TN	ESPN+	**W** 31–6	4,641	
^{#}Rankings from Stats Perform. All times are in Central Time.

==== Second round ====
Date	Time	Visiting team	Home team	Site	TV	Result	Attendance	Ref.
December 6	11:00 AM	No. 11 (12) **South Dakota**	No. 7 (6) Mercer (SoCon)	Five Star Stadium • Macon, GA	ESPN+	**W** 47–0	3,042	
December 6	12:00 PM	No. 17т **Illinois State**	No. 1 (1) **North Dakota State**	Fargodome • Fargo, ND	ESPN+	**ILST** 29–28	10,464	
December 6	12:00 PM	No. 19 **North Dakota**	No. 5 (4) Tarleton State (UAC)	Memorial Stadium • Stephenville, TX	ESPN+	**L** 13–31	19,742	
December 6	1:00 PM	No. 16 (14) **South Dakota State**	No. 3 (3) Montana (Big Sky)	Washington-Grizzly Stadium • Missoula, MT	ESPN+	**L** 29–50	18,197	
^{#}Rankings from Stats Perform. All times are in Central Time.

==== Quarterfinals ====
Date	Time	Visiting team	Home team	Site	TV	Result	Attendance	Ref.
December 13	2:30 PM	No. 11 (12) **South Dakota**	No. 3 (3) Montana (Big Sky)	Washington-Grizzly Stadium • Missoula, MT	ABC	**L** 22–52	22,725	
December 13	4:00 PM	No. 17т **Illinois State**	No. 11 (8) UC Davis (Big Sky)	UC Davis Health Stadium • Davis, CA	ESPN+	**W** 42–31	9,216	
^{#}Rankings from Stats Perform. All times are in Central Time.

==== Semifinals ====
Date	Time	Visiting team	Home team	Site	TV	Result	Attendance	Ref.
December 20	6:30 PM	No. 17т **Illinois State**	No. 9 (12) Villanova (CAA)	Villanova Stadium • Villanova, PA	ESPN2	**W** 30–14	4,133	
^{#}Rankings from Stats Perform. All times are in Central Time.

==== National Championship ====
Date	Time	Visiting team	Home team	Site	TV	Result	Attendance	Ref.
January 5	6:30 PM	No. 17т **Illinois State**	No. 2 (2) Montana State (Big Sky)	FirstBank Stadium • Nashville, TN	ESPN	**L** 34–35^{OT}	24,105	
^{#}Rankings from Stats Perform. All times are in Central Time.

== MVFC records vs other conferences ==
2025–26 records against non-conference foes:

FCS power conferences	Record
Big Sky	5–2
CAA	1–0
FCS power total	6–2
Other FCS conferences	Record
Ivy League	None
MEAC	None
Northeast	3–0
OVC–Big South	6–0
Patriot	None
PFL	6–0
SoCon	1–1
Southland	0–2
SWAC	None
UAC	1–1
Other FCS total	16–4
Other Division I opponents	Record
Football Bowl Subdivision	0–9
Total Division I	23–15
Other NCAA opponents	Record
Division II	2–0
Total non-conference record	25–15

Postseason

FCS power conferences	Record
Big Sky	1–3
CAA	2–0
FCS power total	3–3
Other FCS conferences	Record
Ivy League	0–1
MEAC	None
Northeast	None
OVC–Big South	1–0
Patriot	None
PFL	1–0
SoCon	1–0
Southland	1–0
SWAC	None
UAC	0–1
Other FCS total	4–2
Total postseason record	7–5

== Awards and honors ==
=== Players of the week honors ===
Week	Offensive			Defensive			Special teams			Newcomer			Offensive line		
Week	Player	Position	Team	Player	Position	Team	Player	Position	Team	Player	Position	Team	Player	Position	Team
Week 1 (Sept. 1)	Plez Lawrence	RB	INST	Dathan Hickey	DB	YSU	Sebastian Lopez	PK	INST	Julius Loughridge	RB	SDSU	Seth Anderson	OL	UND
Week 2 (Sept. 8)	Beau Brungard	QB	YSU	Logan Wilson	DL	INST	Matt Maldonado	PK	ILST	Larry Stephens III	WR	INST	Jake Pope	OT	ILST
Week 3 (Sept. 15)	L. J. Phillips Jr.	RB	USD	Tye Niekamp	LB	ILST	Paul Geelen	K/P	SIU	Ayden Price	WR	UNI	Brock Woolf	RT	USD
Week 4 (Sept. 22)	DJ Williams	QB	SIU	Chris Presto	LB	SIU	Shadwel Nkuba II	DB	ILST	Andrew Lastovka	PK	YSU	Derek Harden	OG	SIU
Week 5 (Sept. 29)	Cole Payton	QB	NDSU	Nathaniel Staehling	LB	NDSU	Jackson Williams	RS	NDSU	James Basinger	RB	SDSU	Griffin Empey	RG	NDSU
Week 6 (Oct. 6)	Jerry Kaminski	QB	UND	Shug Walker	LB	SIU	Alex Bullock	WR	SDSU	Max Pelham	P	SDSU	Shane Willenbring	OC	SDSU
Week 7 (Oct. 13)	Cole Payton	QB	NDSU	Malachi McNeal	LB	UND	B.J. Fleming	WR	UND	Will Leyland	PK	USD	Jake Pope	RT	ILST
Week 8 (Oct. 20)	Beau Brungard	QB	YSU	Jalen Lee	S	SDSU	Zeke Mata	PK	USD	Kimal Clark	DB	INST	Liam Becher	OL	UND
Week 9 (Oct. 27)	Cole Payton	QB	NDSU	Tye Niekamp	LB	ILST	Tae Marrero Jr.	PR	SIU	Ky Wilson	KR/WR	YSU	Trent Fraley	C	NDSU
Week 10 (Nov. 3)	Rashad Rochelle	WR/KR	INST	DeJuan Lewis	DB	USD	Nic Yatsko	DB	INST	Jackson Williams	RS	NDSU	Landon Woodard	OG	ILST
Week 11 (Nov. 10)	Bill Jackson	RB	UNI	Donovan Woolen	LB	NDSU	Victor Dawson	S	ILST	Aaron Bickerton	P	NDSU	Jacob Arop	OL	USD
Week 11 (Nov. 10)	Bill Jackson	RB	UNI	Donovan Woolen	LB	NDSU	Victor Dawson	S	ILST	Matt Maldonado	PK	ILST	Jacob Arop	OL	USD
Week 12 (Nov. 17)	Beau Brungard	QB	YSU	Tye Niekamp	LB	ILST	Andrew Lastovka	PK	YSU	Carson Fletcher	RB	USD	Seth Anderson	OL	UND
Week 13 (Nov. 28)	Jawaun Northington	RB	MUST	Dylan Rowsey	DB	MUST	Ky "Flash" Wilson	KR/WR	YSU	Paul Geelen	K/P	SIU	Noah Fenske	C	SIU

=== Players of the Year ===
On December 1, 2025, the Missouri Valley Football Conference released their Players of the Year and All-Conference Honors.

==== Offensive Player of the Year ====
- Beau Brungard, QB (Jr - Youngstown State)

==== Defensive Player of the Year ====
- Tye Niekamp, LB (Jr - Illinois State)

==== Newcomer of the Year ====
- Kimal Clark, DB (Sr - Indiana State)

==== Freshman of the Year ====
- Luke Mailander, WR (Fr - Illinois State)

==== Coach of the Year ====
- Tim Polasek (North Dakota State)

=== All–Conference Teams ===
Award	Player	School	Position	Year
First Team Offense	Beau Brungard	Youngstown State	QB	Jr
First Team Offense	Barika Kpeenu	North Dakota State	RB	Sr
First Team Offense	L. J. Phillips Jr.	South Dakota	RB	So
First Team Offense	Truman Werremeyer	North Dakota State	FB	Sr
First Team Offense	Greyton Gannon	South Dakota State	TE	Jr
First Team Offense	Bryce Lance	North Dakota State	WR	Sr
First Team Offense	Daniel Sobkowicz	Illinois State	WR	Sr
First Team Offense	Max Tomczak	Youngstown State	WR	Sr
First Team Offense	Seth Anderson	North Dakota	OL	GS
First Team Offense	Quinten Christensen	South Dakota State	OL	Jr
First Team Offense	Griffin Empey	North Dakota State	OL	So
First Team Offense	Trent Fraley	North Dakota State	OL	Jr
First Team Offense	Beau Johnson	North Dakota State	OL	So
First Team Offense	Jake Pope	Illinois State	OL	Sr
First Team Defense	Kobe Clayborne	South Dakota State	DL	Sr
First Team Defense	Lance Rucker	North Dakota	DL	Jr
First Team Defense	Mike Wells	Youngstown State	DL	Jr
First Team Defense	Keenan Wilson	North Dakota State	DL	So
First Team Defense	Logan Kopp	North Dakota State	LB	Sr
First Team Defense	Malachi McNeal	North Dakota	LB	Sr
First Team Defense	Tye Niewkamp	Illinois State	LB	Jr
First Team Defense	Tucker Langenberg	Northern Iowa	LB	Sr
First Team Defense	Antonio Bluiett	North Dakota	DB	Jr
First Team Defense	Kimal Clark	Indiana State	DB	Sr
First Team Defense	Jeremiah McClendon	Southern Illinois	DB	Sr
First Team Defense	Mikey Munn	South Dakota	DB	So
First Team Defense	Shadwel Nkuba II	Illinois State	DB	Sr
First Team Special Teams	Eli Ozick	North Dakota State	PK	So
First Team Special Teams	Max Pelham	South Dakota State	P	Sr
First Team Special Teams	Ky "Flash" Wilson	Youngstown State	RS	Jr
First Team Special Teams	Caleb Bowers	North Dakota State	LS	Jr
First Team Special Teams	Rashad Rochelle	Indiana State	AP	Sr

Award	Player	School	Position	Year
Second Team Offense	Cole Payton	North Dakota State	QB	Sr
Second Team Offense	Sawyer Seidl	North Dakota	RB	So
Second Team Offense	Wenkers Wright	Illinois State	WR	Sr
Second Team Offense	Scotty Preston Jr.	Illinois State	FB	Sr
Second Team Offense	Carson Williams	North Dakota State	TE	Sr
Second Team Offense	Larenzo Fenner	South Dakota	WR	So
Second Team Offense	B.J. Fleming	North Dakota	WR	Jr
Second Team Offense	Rashad Rochelle	Indiana State	WR	Sr
Second Team Offense	Liam Becher	North Dakota	OL	Jr
Second Team Offense	Almarion Crim	South Dakota	OL	Sr
Second Team Offense	Noah Fenske	Southern Illinois	OL	Sr
Second Team Offense	Desmeal Leigh	Youngstown State	OL	Jr
Second Team Offense	Landon Woodard	Illinois State	OL	Sr
Second Team Defense	Toby Anene	North Dakota State	DL	Jr
Second Team Defense	Caden Crawford	South Dakota	DL	Jr
Second Team Defense	Owen Ostroski	Northern Iowa	DL	Sr
Second Team Defense	Kaden Vig	North Dakota	DL	So
Second Team Defense	Ryan Crandall	Northern Iowa	LB	Sr
Second Team Defense	Colin Bohanek	Southern Illinois	LB	Sr
Second Team Defense	Cullen McShane	South Dakota State	LB	Jr
Second Team Defense	Donovan Woolen	North Dakota State	So	Jr
Second Team Defense	Lashavion Brown	Illinois State	DB	Jr
Second Team Defense	Jailen Duffie	North Dakota State	DB	So
Second Team Defense	Jalen Lee	South Dakota State	DB	Jr
Second Team Defense	DeJuan Lewis	South Dakota	DB	Sr
Second Team Special Teams	Paul Geelen	Southern Illinois	PK	Sr
Second Team Special Teams	Brendon Kilpatrick	Youngstown State	P	Sr
Second Team Special Teams	Jackson Williams	North Dakota State	RS	So
Second Team Special Teams	Dylan Calabrese	Illinois State	LS	Sr
Second Team Special Teams	L. J. Phillips Jr.	South Dakota	AP	So

=== National Awards ===
On November 24, 2025, STATS Perform released their list of finalists for the Walter Payton Award, Buck Buchanan Award, Jerry Rice Award, and Eddie Robinson Award, respectively. Finalists are listed in alphabetical order.

==== Walter Payton Award ====
The Walter Payton Award is given to the best offensive player in the FCS. The MVFC's own Beau Brungard (QB - Youngstown State) won the award. The following players were listed as finalists for the award:

- Bryce Lance (WR - North Dakota State)
- Cole Payton (QB - North Dakota State)
- DJ Williams (QB - Southern Illinois)
- L. J. Phillips Jr. (RB - South Dakota)

==== Buck Buchanan Award ====
The following MVFC players were listed as finalists for the Buck Buchanan Award, which was given to the best FCS defensive player:

- Kimal Clark (DB - Indiana State)
- Logan Kopp (LB - North Dakota State)
- Tye Niekamp (LB - Illinois State)

==== Jerry Rice Award ====
The following MVFC players were listed as finalists for the Jerry Rice Award, which was the given to the most outstanding FCS freshman player:

- Nic Yatsko (DB - Indiana State)

==== Eddie Robinson Award ====
The following MVFC coaches were listed as finalists for the Eddie Robinson Award, which was given to the best FCS head coach:

- Tim Polasek (North Dakota State)

=== All-Americans ===
	AP 1st Team	AP 2nd Team	AFCA 1st Team	AFCA 2nd Team	STATS 1st Team	STATS 2nd Team	STATS 3rd Team	ADA
Beau Brungard, QB, Youngstown State	✓		✓		✓			✓
Beau Johnson, OL, North Dakota State		✓						
Bryce Lance, WR, North Dakota State	✓		✓		✓			✓
Caleb Bowers, LS, North Dakota State					✓			
Cole Payton, QB, North Dakota State		✓			✓			
Daniel Sobkowicz, WR, Illinois State		✓					✓	
DJ Williams, WR, Southern Illinois							✓	
Dylan Calabrese, LS, Illinois State						✓		
Eli Ozick, PK, North Dakota State		✓				✓		✓
Griffin Empey, OL, North Dakota State	✓			✓			✓	
Jeremiah McClendon, DB, Southern Illinois		✓				✓		
Kimal Clark, DB, Indiana State	✓				✓			
Kobe Clayborne, DL, South Dakota State				✓			✓	
Lance Rucker, DL, North Dakota		✓				✓		
Logan Kopp, LB, North Dakota State		✓	✓			✓		
L.J. Phillips Jr., RB, South Dakota		✓	✓			✓		
Max Pelham, P, South Dakota State			✓					
Max Tomczak, WR, Youngstown State							✓	
Mike Wells, DL, Youngstown State							✓	
Paul Geelen, PK, Southern Illinois							✓	
Quinten Christensen, OL, South Dakota State	✓					✓		
Seth Anderson, OL, North Dakota		✓			✓			
Shadwel Nkuba II, DB, Illinois State		✓		✓			✓	
Trent Fraley, OL, North Dakota State	✓		✓		✓			✓
Tye Niekamp, LB, Illinois State	✓		✓		✓			✓

== Home attendance ==
Team	Stadium	Capacity	Game 1	Game 2	Game 3	Game 4	Game 5	Game 6	Game 7	Game 8	Total	Average	% of capacity
Illinois State	Hancock Stadium	13,391	9,671	11,287†	9,829	9,834	7,756	6,895			55,272	9,212	68.7%
Indiana State	Memorial Stadium	12,764	3,206	5,281	5,373†	3,252	3,202	2,834			23,148	3,858	30.2%
Murray State	Roy Stewart Stadium	16,800	15,027†	5,647	6,746	8,506	6,783				42,709	8,541	50.8%
North Dakota	Alerus Center	12,283	11,469	11,424	11,960	10,618	**12,749**†	11,396			69,616	11,602	94.5%
North Dakota State	Fargodome	18,700	17,354	18,498†	15,812	14,607	14,736	15,278	10,464‡		106,749	15,249	81.6%
Northern Iowa	UNI-Dome	16,324	9,079	10,774	12,084†	8,434	8,529	7,361			56,261	9,376	57.4%
South Dakota	DakotaDome	9,100	6,445	7,441	7,953	6,333	6,809	**9,159**†	3,964‡		48,104	6,872	75.5%
South Dakota State	Dana J. Dykhouse Stadium	19,340	19,163	19,213	19,034	**19,342**	**19,477**†	15,842	11,407	3,843‡	127,321	15,915	82.3%
Southern Illinois	Saluki Stadium	15,000	6,585	10,132†	5,132	8,115	5,622				35,586	7,117	47.4%
Youngstown State	Stambaugh Stadium	20,630	7,040	12,042†	11,068	9,664	8,448	7,392	4,869‡		60,523	8,646	41.9%

Bold - Exceed or met capacity
†Season High
‡FCS Playoff Game

== 2026 NFL Draft ==
The following list includes all MVFC players who were drafted in the 2026 NFL draft.

Player	Position	School	Draft round	Round pick	Overall pick	Team
Bryce Lance	WR	North Dakota State	4	36	136	New Orleans Saints
Cole Payton	QB	North Dakota State	5	38	178	Philadelphia Eagles

=== Undrafted free agents ===
Player	Position	School	Team
Daniel Sobkowicz	WR	Illinois State	Houston Texans
Alex Bullock	WR	South Dakota State	Jacksonville Jaguars
Sam Hagen	OL	South Dakota State	Houston Texans
Max Tomczak	WR	Youngstown State	Buffalo Bills
Barika Kpeenu	RB	North Dakota State	Tampa Bay Buccaneers

== Head coaches ==
Through January 5, 2026
All stats include 2025 season

Team	Head coach	Years at school	Overall record	Record at school	MVFC record	MVFC titles	FCS playoff appearances	FCS playoff record	National titles
Illinois State	Brock Spack	17	123–79 (.609)	123–79 (.609)	76–57 (.571)	2	7	12–7 (.632)	0
Indiana State	Curt Mallory	8 (Note: Indiana State did not play football in the 2020–21 academic year)	27–64 (.297)	27–64 (.297)	17–47 (.266)	0	0	0–0 (–)	0
Murray State	Jody Wright	2	2–22 (.083)	2–22 (.083)	1–15 (.063)	0	0	0–0 (–)	0
North Dakota	Eric Schmidt	1	8–6 (.571)	8–6 (.571)	5–3 (.625)	0	1	1–1 (.500)	0
North Dakota State	Tim Polasek	2	26–3 (.897)	26–3 (.897)	15–1 (.938)	2	2	4–1 (.800)	1
Northern Iowa	Todd Stepsis	1	3–9 (.250)	3–9 (.250)	1–7 (.125)	0	0	0–0 (–)	0
South Dakota	Travis Johansen	1	10–5 (.667)	10–5 (.667)	6–2 (.750)	0	1	2–1 (.667)	0
South Dakota State	Dan Jackson	1	9–5 (.643)	9–5 (.643)	4–4 (.500)	0	1	1–1 (.500)	0
Southern Illinois	Nick Hill	10	55–61 (.474)	55–61 (.474)	32–46 (.410)	0	3	3–3 (.500)	0
Youngstown State	Doug Phillips	6	29–36 (.446)	29–36 (.446)	20–26 (.435)	0	2	1–2 (.333)	0
