= Desmeal Leigh =

American football player

No. 78 – Youngstown State Penguins
- Position: Offensive tackle
- Class: Redshirt Senior

Personal information
- Listed height: 6 ft 7 in (2.01 m)
- Listed weight: 325 lb (147 kg)

Career information
- High school: Roosevelt (Kent, Ohio)
- College: Youngstown State (2022–present)

Awards and highlights
- Third-team FCS All-American (2025); First-team FCS Freshman All-American (2023); Second-team All-MVFC (2025)
- Stats at ESPN

Desmeal Leigh is an American college football offensive tackle for the Youngstown State Penguins.

== Early life ==
Leigh always wanted to play football growing up. However, his mother feared injuries and never allowed him to try the sport. Leigh attended Roosevelt High School in Kent, Ohio, where he was a standout basketball and lacrosse player. As a junior, he averaged 10.4 points and 6.1 rebounds per game, earning All-Northeast Inland District Division I honorable mention from the Ohio Prep Sportswriters Association (OPSWA). As a senior, Leigh was allowed to play football for the first time in his life. In his lone season of high school football, he earned All-Northeast Inland District Division II honorable mention from the OPSWA.

Leigh was unranked as a recruit for college football. Nevertheless, he received some interest from the Penguins of nearby Youngstown State University (YSU). "In our league, you better have size, so that jumped out", said Penguins head coach Doug Phillips. "Then to go see him play a basketball game, he had the footwork, he had the athleticism and he could bend". Leigh signed with Youngstown State during the early signing period in December 2021.

== College career ==
Leigh joined the Youngstown State Penguins of the Football Championship Subdivision (FCS), putting on approximately 50 lb (23 kg) of mass upon his arrival on campus. As a freshman in 2022, he appeared in one game and was redshirted. In 2023, Leigh started all 13 games at left tackle, helping the Penguins reach the FCS playoffs for the first time since 2016. He was named a first- and second-team FCS Freshman All-American by Stats Perform and Phil Steele, respectively. In 2024, Leigh started all 12 games at left tackle, garnering All-Missouri Valley Football Conference (MVFC) honorable mention.

In 2025, Leigh started all 13 games at left tackle. He helped his quarterback, Beau Brungard, win the Walter Payton Award while the Penguins earned another FCS playoffs appearance. Leigh was a second-team all-MVFC honoree. He was also a third-team All-American selection by Sports Illustrated.

Leigh turned down offers from multiple Power Four programs to remain at YSU for the 2026 season. He was listed at No. 30 on Bruce Feldman's Freaks List, an annual ranking of the top "freak" athletes in college football, and was one of just two FCS players named to the Senior Bowl Top 300 list.
