= Rashad Rochelle =

American football player (born 2003)

Profile
- Position: Wide receiver

Personal information
- Born: May 19, 2003 (age 23); Springfield, Illinois, U.S.
- Listed height: 5 ft 11 in (1.80 m)
- Listed weight: 185 lb (84 kg)

Career information
- High school: Springfield (Springfield, Illinois)
- College: Rutgers (2022–2023); Indiana State (2024–2025)
- NFL draft: 2026: undrafted

Career history
- Seattle Seahawks (2026)*
- * Offseason or practice squad member only

Awards and highlights
- First-team All-MVFC (2025)

Rashad Rochelle (born May 19, 2003) is an American professional football wide receiver. He played college football for the Rutgers Scarlet Knights and the Indiana State Sycamores. He was signed as an undrafted free agent by the Seahawks after the 2026 NFL draft.

== Early life ==
Rochelle was born in Springfield, Illinois and attended Springfield High School. He played quarterback and defensive back, earning all-state honors and finishing his career as one of the top dual-threat quarterbacks in Illinois.

== College career ==
=== Rutgers ===
Rochelle began his college career at Rutgers. As a freshman in 2022, he appeared in nine games and recorded 27 rushing attempts for 109 yards and one touchdown, along with one reception for −2 yards. He also returned one kickoff for 18 yards. In 2023, he played in all 12 games and handled return duties, recording four kick returns for 165 yards and four punt returns for eight yards.

=== Indiana State ===
Rochelle transferred to Indiana State for the 2024 season. In 2024, he appeared in all 12 games and had 58 receptions for 527 yards and 4 touchdowns, along with 7 rushing attempts for 7 yards, 26 kick returns for 616 yards, 13 punt returns for 135 yards, and one completed pass for 24 yards. In 2025, he played in 10 games and had 39 receptions for 743 yards and 8 touchdowns, one rushing attempt for 4 yards, 17 kick returns for 457 yards and one touchdown, 8 punt returns for 85 yards, and one completed pass for 23 yards. In two seasons with the Sycamores, he totaled 97 receptions for 1,270 yards and 12 touchdowns, 8 rushing attempts for 11 yards, 43 kick returns for 1,073 yards and one touchdown, and 21 punt returns for 220 yards.

== Professional career ==
Pre-draft measurables
Height	Weight	Arm length	Hand span	Wingspan	40-yard dash	10-yard split	20-yard split	20-yard shuttle	Three-cone drill	Vertical jump	Broad jump	Bench press
5 ft 10 3/8 in (1.79 m)	178 lb (81 kg)	30 1/4 in (0.77 m)	8 3/4 in (0.22 m)	5 ft 10 1/4 in (1.78 m)	4.51 s	1.57 s	2.59 s	4.33 s	7.14 s	37.0 in (0.94 m)	10 ft 3 in (3.12 m)	14 reps
All values from Pro Day

On May 14, 2026, Rochelle signed a three-year, $3.1 million contract with the Seattle Seahawks as an undrafted free agent. On August 30, he was waived by the Seahawks as a part of final roster cuts.
