= Paul Geelen =

Dutch gridiron football player (born 2003)

No. 18 – Ottawa Redblacks
- Position: Placekicker
- Roster status: Active
- CFL status: Global

Personal information
- Born: March 14, 2003 (age 23); Utrecht, Netherlands
- Listed height: 6 ft 6 in (1.98 m)
- Listed weight: 205 lb (93 kg)

Career information
- High school: Harper Creek (Battle Creek, Michigan, U.S.)
- College: William Jewell (2022–2023); Southern Illinois (2024–2025)
- NFL draft: 2026: undrafted
- CFL draft: 2026G: 2nd round, 10th overall pick

Career history
- Ottawa Redblacks (2026–present)

Awards and highlights
- Second-team All-MVFC (2025); First-team All-GLVC (2023) (Note: Selected as kicker); Second-team All-GLVC (2023) (Note: Selected as punter)
- Stats at CFL.ca

Paul Geelen (born March 14, 2003) is a Dutch professional Canadian football placekicker for the Ottawa Redblacks of the Canadian Football League (CFL). He played college football for the Southern Illinois Salukis and William Jewell Cardinals.

== Early life ==
Geelen was born on March 14, 2003 in Utrecht, Netherlands. He attended Harper Creek High School in Battle Creek, Michigan as an exchange student.

== College career ==
Geelen played college football for the Southern Illinois Salukis from 2022 to 2023 and William Jewell Cardinals from 2024 to 2025. At William Jewell he served as the team's primary kicker and punter for two year. Geelen went 15-of-22 on field goals with a long of 49 yards and had an average of 40.0 yards per punt with a long of 62 and 29 kicks inside the 20-yard line. He earned first-team and second-team All-GLVC honors as a punter and kicker respectively.

Geelen then transferred to Southern Illinois University Carbondale for his final two seasons. As a junior, he converted 10-of-15 field goals with a long of 50 yards and made 24-of-27 PATs while averaging 43.1 yards per punt. Geelen also scored a touchdown on a fake field goal against Missouri State. In 2025, he went 15-of-17 on field goals with a long of 53 and averaged 40.8 yards per punt. Geelen earned second-team All-MVFC honors as a kicker.

== Professional career ==
Pre-draft measurables
Height	Weight	Arm length	Hand span	Wingspan
6 ft 6 in (1.98 m)	198 lb (90 kg)	33 in (0.84 m)	9 1/2 in (0.24 m)	6 ft 7 in (2.01 m)
All values from Pro day

Geelen was selected in the second round, with the tenth overall selection, by the Ottawa Redblacks in the 2026 CFL global draft. On May 17, he officially signed with the team. On May 31, Geelen was moved to the practice roster. On October 1, he was elevated to the active roster after the Redblacks traded Brett Lauther to the Saskatchewan Roughriders. In a loss to the Hamilton Tiger-Cats, Geelen converted three-of-four field goals and an extra point. On October 16, against the Toronto Argonauts, he kicked the winning PAT to snap a 22-game losing streak.
