= Sam Hagen =

American football player (born 2003)

No. 76 – Houston Texans
- Position: Guard
- Roster status: Injured reserve

Personal information
- Born: August 24, 2003 (age 23); Fordville, North Dakota, U.S.
- Listed height: 6 ft 6 in (1.98 m)
- Listed weight: 320 lb (145 kg)

Career information
- High school: Park River (Park River, North Dakota)
- College: North Dakota (2021–2023); South Dakota State (2024–2025)
- NFL draft: 2026: undrafted

Career history
- Houston Texans (2026–present)
- Stats at Pro Football Reference

Sam Hagen (born August 24, 2003) is an American football offensive linemen for the Houston Texans of the National Football League (NFL). He played college football for the North Dakota Fighting Hawks and South Dakota State Jackrabbits.

== Early life ==
Hagen attended Park River High school in Park River, North Dakota. Coming out of high school, he committed to play college football for the North Dakota Fighting Hawks.

== College career ==
In three years at North Dakota from 2021 to 2023, Hagen appeared in 24 games, while making 17 starts. After the 2023 season, he entered the NCAA transfer portal.

Hagen transferred to play for the South Dakota State Jackrabbits. In two years at South Dakota State from 2024 to 2025, he played in 23 games, while making 22 starts.

== Professional career ==
Pre-draft measurables
Height	Weight	Arm length	Hand span	Wingspan	20-yard shuttle	Three-cone drill	Vertical jump	Broad jump	Bench press
6 ft 6 1/8 in (1.98 m)	320 lb (145 kg)	32 7/8 in (0.84 m)	9 5/8 in (0.24 m)	6 ft 8 in (2.03 m)	4.80 s	7.60 s	30.5 in (0.77 m)	8 ft 6 in (2.59 m)	24 reps
All values from Pro Day

After going undrafted in the 2026 NFL draft, Hagen signed with the Houston Texans as an undrafted free agent. He was placed on injured reserve on September 1, 2026.
