= Max Tomczak =

American football player (born 2003)

Profile
- Position: Wide receiver

Personal information
- Listed height: 6 ft 0 in (1.83 m)
- Listed weight: 195 lb (88 kg)

Career information
- High school: Lincoln-Way East (Frankfort, Illinois)
- College: Youngstown State (2021–2025)
- NFL draft: 2026: undrafted

Career history
- Buffalo Bills (2026)*
- * Offseason or practice squad member only

Awards and highlights
- 2× First-team All-MVFC (2024, 2025)
- Stats at Pro Football Reference

Max Tomczak is an American professional football wide receiver. He played college football at Youngstown State.

== Early life ==
Tomczak grew up in Frankfort, Illinois and attended Lincoln-Way East High School.

His uncle Mike is a former NFL quarterback.

== College career ==
Tomczak redshirted his true freshman season with the Youngstown State Penguins. As a redshirt freshman, he caught 26 passes for 430 yards and two touchdowns and was named to the Missouri Valley Football Conference (MVFC) All-Newcomer Team. Tomczak had 56 receptions for 669 yards and a touchdown during his redshirt sophomore season. As a redshirt junior, he caught 73 passes for 904 yards and four touchdowns and was named first-team All-MVFC. Tomczak repeated as a first-team all-conference selection in his final season after finishing with 70 receptions for 1,021 yards and eight touchdowns.

== Professional career ==
Pre-draft measurables
Height	Weight	Arm length	Hand span	Wingspan	40-yard dash	10-yard split	20-yard split	20-yard shuttle	Three-cone drill	Vertical jump	Broad jump	Bench press
5 ft 11 in (1.80 m)	193 lb (88 kg)	29 3/8 in (0.75 m)	9 in (0.23 m)	5 ft 11 3/8 in (1.81 m)	4.54 s	1.54 s	2.48 s	4.01 s	6.68 s	34.5 in (0.88 m)	9 ft 5 in (2.87 m)	12 reps
All values from Pro Day

Tomczak was signed by the Buffalo Bills as an undrafted free agent on May 8, 2026. He was waived by the Bills on May 27 and re-signed on June 11. On August 30, he was waived as part of final roster cuts.
