= L. J. Phillips =

American football player (born 2004)

L. J. Phillips Jr.
No. 21 – Iowa Hawkeyes
- Position: Running back
- Class: Redshirt Junior

Personal information
- Born: August 3, 2004 (age 22)
- Listed height: 5 ft 9 in (1.75 m)
- Listed weight: 225 lb (102 kg)

Career information
- High school: Wichita Northwest (Wichita, Kansas)
- College: South Dakota (2023–2025); Iowa (2026–present)

Awards and highlights
- First-team All-MVFC (2025)
- Stats at ESPN

Lendon Phillips Jr. (born August 3, 2004) is an American college football running back for the Iowa Hawkeyes. He previously played for the South Dakota Coyotes.

== Early life ==
Phillips attended Wichita Northwest High School in Wichita, Kansas. As a junior, he rushed for 1,982 yards before tearing his anterior cruciate ligament in his left knee during a state playoff game. Following his high school career, Phillips committed to play college football at the University of South Dakota.

== College career ==
Phillips played sparingly during his first two seasons and entered the 2025 as the Coyotes' second string running back behind Charles Pierre Jr. Following an injury to Pierre, Phillips emerged as the team's starting running back. In his first career start against Northern Colorado, he rushed for 301 yards on 35 carries and two touchdowns. For his performance, Phillips was named the STATS Perform FCS National Offensive Player of the Week. He finished his redshirt sophomore campaign, leading the Missouri Valley Conference in rushing yards and carries, being named a finalist for the Walter Payton Award, and helping lead the Coyotes to the FCS playoffs. In December 2025, after finishing the season with 1,920 rushing yards and 19 rushing touchdowns, Phillips announced his decision to enter the transfer portal.

On January 11, 2026, Phillips announced his decision to transfer to the University of Iowa to play for the Iowa Hawkeyes.

=== Statistics ===
College statistics
Season	Team	Games	Rushing				Receiving			
Season	Team	GP	Att	Yards	Avg	TD	Rec	Yards	Avg	TD
2023	South Dakota	6	17	96	5.6	2	–	–	–	–
2024	South Dakota	14	29	176	6.1	2	1	7	7.0	0
2025	South Dakota	15	295	1,920	6.5	19	28	195	7.0	1
Career		35	341	2,192	6.4	23	29	202	7.0	1
