= 2025 North Dakota Fighting Hawks football team =

American college football season

2025 North Dakota Fighting Hawks football

NCAA Division I Second Round, L 13–31 vs. Tarleton State
- Conference: Missouri Valley Football Conference

Ranking
- STATS: No. 14
- FCS Coaches: No. 16
- Record: 8–6 (5–3 MVFC)
- Head coach: Eric Schmidt (1st season)
- Offensive coordinator: Isaac Fruechte (2nd season)
- Offensive scheme: Spread
- Base defense: 4–2–5
- Home stadium: Alerus Center

2025 Missouri Valley Football Conference standings
	Conf.			Overall
Team	W		L	W		L
No. 4т North Dakota State $^	8	–	0	12	–	1
No. 9 South Dakota ^	6	–	2	10	–	5
No. 2 Illinois State ^	5	–	3	12	–	5
No. 14 North Dakota ^	5	–	3	8	–	6
No. 18 Youngstown State ^	5	–	3	8	–	5
No. 13 South Dakota State ^	4	–	4	9	–	5
No. 25 Southern Illinois	4	–	4	7	–	5
Northern Iowa	1	–	7	3	–	9
Murray State	1	–	7	1	–	11
Indiana State	1	–	7	3	–	9
$ – Conference champion; ^ – FCS playoff participant; Rankings from STATS Poll

The 2025 North Dakota Fighting Hawks football team represented the University of North Dakota as a member of the Missouri Valley Football Conference (MVFC) during the 2025 NCAA Division I FCS football season. The Fighting Hawks were led by first-year head coach Eric Schmidt. Schmidt was taking over for former coach Bubba Schweigert, who stepped down after the 2024 season. They played home games at the Alerus Center in Grand Forks, North Dakota.

== Schedule ==
Date	Time	Opponent	Rank	Site	TV	Result	Attendance
August 30	6:00 pm	at No. 17 (FBS) Kansas State*		Bill Snyder Family Football Stadium; Manhattan, KS	ESPN+	L 35–38	51,927
September 6	6:00 pm	Portland State*	No. 20	Alerus Center; Grand Forks, ND	Midco Sports, ESPN+	W 50–20	11,469
September 13	2:00 pm	at No. 5 Montana*	No. 16	Washington–Grizzly Stadium; Missoula, MT	Midco Sports, ESPN+	L 23–24	26,492
September 20	3:00 pm	Valparaiso*^{†}	No. 16	Alerus Center; Grand Forks, ND	Midco Sports, ESPN+	W 58–7	11,424
October 4	4:00 pm	at Northern Iowa	No. 15	UNI-Dome; Cedar Falls, IA	Midco Sports, ESPN+	W 35–7	12,048
October 11	3:00 pm	Youngstown State	No. 13	Alerus Center; Grand Forks, ND	Midco Sports, ESPN+	W 35–17	11,960
October 18	2:00 pm	at No. 12 Southern Illinois	No. 9	Saluki Stadium; Carbondale, IL	ESPN+	W 38–19	5,132
October 25	3:00 pm	Indiana State	No. 8	Alerus Center; Grand Forks, ND	Midco Sports, ESPN+	W 46–17	10,618
November 1	1:00 pm	at South Dakota	No. 8	DakotaDome; Vermillion, SD (Sitting Bull Trophy)	Midco Sports, ESPN+	L 21–26	6,809
November 8	1:00 pm	No. 1 North Dakota State	No. 13	Alerus Center; Grand Forks, ND (Nickel Trophy)	Midco Sports, ESPN+	L 10–15	12,749
November 15	11:00 am	at Murray State	No. 13	Roy Stewart Stadium; Murray, KY	ESPN+	W 35–17	6,783
November 22	1:00 pm	No. 22 South Dakota State	No. 13	Alerus Center; Grand Forks, ND	Midco Sports, ESPN+	L 31–34 ^{OT}	11,396
November 29	12:00 pm	at No. 6 Tennessee Tech*	No. 19	Tucker Stadium; Cookeville, TN (NCAA Division I First Round)	ESPN+	W 31–6	4,641
December 6	12:00 pm	at No. 5 Tarleton State*	No. 19	Memorial Stadium; Stephenville, TX (NCAA Division I Second Round)	ESPN+	L 13–31	19,742
*Non-conference game; ^{†}Homecoming; Rankings from STATS Poll released prior to the game; All times are in Central time

== Rankings ==
Ranking movements Legend: ██ Increase in ranking ██ Decrease in ranking RV = Received votes т = Tied with team above or below
	Week														
Poll	Pre	1	2	3	4	5	6	7	8	9	10	11	12	13	Final
STATS	RV	20	16	16	14	15	13	9	8	8	13	13	13	19	14
Coaches	RV	22	17	17	15т	14	12	11	10	10	15	18	16	23	16

== Preseason ==
=== MVFC poll ===
The Missouri Valley Football Conference released its preseason poll on July 21, 2025, voted on by league athletic directors, coaches, and media members. The Fighting Hawks were predicted to finish seventh in the conference.

== Game summaries ==
=== Regular season ===
==== at No. 17 (FBS) Kansas State ====
North Dakota Fighting Hawks (0–0) at No. 17 (FBS) Kansas State Wildcats (0–1) – Game summary

Quarter	1	2	3	4	Total
Fighting Hawks	7	14	0	14	35
No. 17 (FBS) Wildcats	10	7	14	7	38

at Bill Snyder Family Football Stadium, Manhattan, Kansas

- Date: August 30, 2025
- Game time: 6:00 pm
- Game weather: Cloudy • Temperature: 73 °F (23 °C) • Wind: SE at 5 miles per hour (8.0 km/h)
- Game attendance: 51,927
- Referee: Tim Rich
- TV announcers (ESPN+): Shawn Kenney (play-by-play) and Barrett Brooks (analyst)

Game information
First quarter
- (5:26) KSU – Luis Rodriguez 30-yard field goal (Drive: 12 plays, 67 yards, 6:11; Kansas State 3–0)
- (2:54) UND – Jerry Kaminski 1-yard run, C. J. Elrichs kick (Drive: 5 plays, 75 yards, 2:32; North Dakota 7–3)
- (1:55) KSU – Jayce Brown 44-yard pass from Avery Johnson, Luis Rodriguez kick (Drive: 5 plays, 68 yards, 0:54; Kansas State 10–7)

Second quarter

- (7:46) UND – Jerry Kaminski 1-yard run, C. J. Elrichs kick (Drive: 10 plays, 80 yards, 5:50; North Dakota 14–10)
- (4:15) KSU – Jaron Tibbs 30-yard pass from Avery Johnson, Luis Rodriguez kick (Drive: 6 plays, 66 yards, 3:12; Kansas State 17–14)
- (0:24) UND – Sawyer Seidl 16-yard run, C. J. Elrichs kick (Drive: 13 plays, 75 yards, 3:51; North Dakota 21–17)

Third quarter

- (8:41) KSU – DeVon Rice 9-yard run, Luis Rodriguez kick (Drive: 10 plays, 57 yards, 4:47; Kansas State 24–21)
- (3:41) KSU – DeVon Rice 13-yard run, Luis Rodriguez kick (Drive: 8 plays, 77 yards, 3:58; Kansas State 31–21)

Fourth quarter

- (10:12) UND – Korey Tai 22-yard pass from Jerry Kaminski, C. J. Elrichs kick (Drive: 9 plays, 71 yards, 4:35; Kansas State 31–28)
- (4:19) UND – Sawyer Seidl 20-yard run, C. J. Elrichs kick (Drive: 9 plays, 70 yards, 4:41; North Dakota 35–31)
- (0:42) KSU – Joe Jackson 6-yard pass from Avery Johnson, Luis Rodriguez kick (Drive: 10 plays, 81 yards, 1:03; Kansas State 38–35)

Statistics	UND	KSU
First downs	23	22
Total yards	354	461
Rushing yards	102	143
Passing yards	252	318
Passing: Comp–Att–Int	24–39–0	28–43–0
Turnovers	1	1
Time of possession	31:14	28:46

Team	Category	Player	Statistics
North Dakota	Passing	Jerry Kaminski	23/38, 231 yards, TD
North Dakota	Rushing	Sawyer Seidl	8 carries, 62 yards, 2 TD
North Dakota	Receiving	Caden Dennis	2 receptions, 41 yards
Kansas State	Passing	Avery Johnson	28/43, 318 yards, 3 TD
Kansas State	Rushing	Joe Jackson	11 carries, 55 yards
Kansas State	Receiving	Jayce Brown	12 receptions, 109 yards, TD

==== Portland State ====
Portland State Vikings (0–2) at No. 20 North Dakota Fighting Hawks (0–1) – Game summary

Quarter	1	2	3	4	Total
Vikings	6	0	7	7	20
No. 20 Fighting Hawks	22	14	7	7	50

at Alerus Center, Grand Forks, ND

- Date: September 6, 2025
- Game time: 6:00 pm
- Game weather: Indoors • Temperature: 70 °F (21 °C)
- Game attendance: 11,469
- Referee: John Shay
- TV announcers (ESPN+): Brian Shawn (play-by-play) and Ryan Kasowski (analyst)

Game information

First quarter

- (10:37) UND – Nathan Hromadka 5-yard pass from Jerry Kaminski, C.J. Elrichs kick (Drive: 9 plays, 61 yards, 4:17; North Dakota 7–0)
- (8:43) UND – Jerry Kaminski 7-yard run, Simon Romfo rush (Drive: 4 plays, 17 yards, 1:49; North Dakota 15–0)
- (4:36) UND – Deng Deng 4-yard pass from Jerry Kaminski, C.J. Elrichs kick (Drive: 6 plays, 61 yards, 3:05; North Dakota 22–0)
- (0:48) PRST – Jaylen Lynch 34-yard pass from John-Keawe Sagapolutele (Drive: 7 plays, 77 yards, 3:41; North Dakota 22–6)

Second quarter

- (11:29) UND – Nathan Hromadka 20-yard pass from Jerry Kaminski, C.J. Elrichs kick (Drive: 5 plays, 60 yards, 2:03; North Dakota 29–6)
- (4:27) UND – Gaven Ziebarth 5-yard run, C.J. Elrichs kick (Drive: 3 plays, 25 yards, 1:12; North Dakota 36–6)

Third quarter

- (9:07) UND – Tray Kuntz 4-yard pass from Jerry Kaminski, C.J. Elrichs kick (Drive: 6 plays, 44 yards, 2:48; North Dakota 43–6)
- (2:25) PRST – Delon Thompson 3-yard run, Mathias Uribe kick (Drive: 13 plays, 80 yards, 6:35; North Dakota 43–13)

Fourth quarter

- (10:55) UND – Javance Tupou'ata-Johnson 2-yard run, C.J. Elrichs kick (Drive: 12 plays, 90 yards, 6:26; North Dakota 50–13)
- (4:30) PRST – Jaxton Helmstetler 70-yard fumble recovery, Mathias Uribe kick (North Dakota 50–20)

Statistics	PRST	UND
First downs	12	27
Plays–yards	49–228	74–446
Rushes–yards	31–82	51–275
Passing yards	146	171
Passing: Comp–Att–Int	11–18–2	15–23–0
Turnovers	3	1
Time of possession	24:26	35:34

Team	Category	Player	Statistics
Portland State	Passing	John-Keawe Sagapolutele	11/17, 146 yards, TD, 2 INT
Portland State	Rushing	Terence Loville	4 carries, 30 yards
Portland State	Receiving	Jaylen Lynch	2 receptions, 41 yards, TD
North Dakota	Passing	Jerry Kaminski	14/21, 164 yards, 4 TD
North Dakota	Rushing	Jerry Kaminski	8 carries, 70 yards, TD
North Dakota	Receiving	Nathan Hromadka	3 receptions, 41 yards, 2 TD

==== at No. 5 Montana ====
No. 16 North Dakota Fighting Hawks (1–1) at No. 5 Montana Grizzlies (1–0) – Game summary

Quarter	1	2	3	4	Total
No. 16 Fighting Hawks	13	3	0	7	23
No. 5 Grizzlies	7	0	7	10	24

at Washington–Grizzly Stadium, Missoula, MT

- Date: September 13, 2025
- Game time: 2:00 pm
- Game weather: Sunny • Temperature: 72 °F (22 °C)
- Game attendance: 26,492
- Referee: Gregg Wilson
- TV announcers (ESPN+): Trey Bender (play-by-play), Jordan Tripp (analyst) and Kyle Hansen (sideline)

Game information

First quarter

- (8:07) UND – B.J. Fleming 82-yard pass from Jerry Kaminski, C.J. Elrichs kick failed (Drive: 2 plays, 84 yards, 0:47; North Dakota 6–0)
- (3:24) UND – Deng Deng 10-yard pass from Jerry Kaminski, C.J. Elrichs kick (Drive: 9 plays, 74 yards, 2:54; North Dakota 13–0)
- (0:51) MONT – Stevie Rocker Jr. 3-yard run, Ty Morrison kick (Drive: 5 plays, 69 yards, 2:26; North Dakota 13–7)

Second quarter

- (11:11) UND – C.J. Elrichs 32-yard field goal (Drive: 5 plays, 32 yards, 1:44; North Dakota 16–7)

Third quarter

- (3:24) MONT – Brooks Davis 24-yard pass from Keali'i Ah Yat, Ty Morrison kick (Drive: 3 plays, 33 yards, 0:57; North Dakota 16–14)

Fourth quarter

- (14:00) UND – Korey Tai 4-yard pass from Jerry Kaminski, C.J. Elrichs kick (Drive: 10 plays, 75 yards, 4:24; North Dakota 23–14)
- (4:23) MONT – Ty Morrison 42-yard field goal (Drive: 10 plays, 67 yards, 3:04; North Dakota 23–17)
- (1:35) MONT – Brooks Favis 28-yard pass from Keali'i Ah Yat, Ty Morrison kick (Drive: 7 plays, 67 yards, 1:07; Montana 24–23)

Statistics	UND	MONT
First downs	19	18
Plays–yards	82–460	74–368
Rushes–yards	41–202	35–68
Passing yards	258	300
Passing: Comp–Att–Int	17–41–1	25–39–2
Turnovers	1	2
Time of possession	30:37	29:23

Team	Category	Player	Statistics
North Dakota	Passing	Jerry Kaminski	17/40, 258 yards, 3 TD, INT
North Dakota	Rushing	Jerry Kaminski	12 carries, 85 yards
North Dakota	Receiving	B.J. Fleming	5 receptions, 138 yards, TD
Montana	Passing	Keali'i Ah Yat	25/39, 300 yards, 2 TD, 2 INT
Montana	Rushing	Eli Gillman	16 carries, 82 yards
Montana	Receiving	Brooks Davis	5 receptions, 98 yards, 2 TD

==== Valparaiso ====
Valparaiso Beacons (1–3) vs. No. 16 North Dakota Fighting Hawks (1–2) – Game summary

Quarter	1	2	3	4	Total
Beacons	0	0	7	0	7
No. 16 Fighting Hawks	7	17	14	10	48

at Alerus Center, Grand Forks, ND

- Date: September 20, 2025
- Game time: 3:00 pm
- Game weather: Indoors • Temperature: 70 °F (21 °C)
- Game attendance: 11,424
- Referee: John Shay
- TV announcers (ESPN+): Brian Shawn (play-by-play) and Ryan Kasowski (analyst)

Game information
First quarter
- (7:45) UND – Sawyer Seidl 7-yard run, C.J. Elrichs kick (Drive: 10 plays, 85 yards, 5:07; North Dakota 7–0)

Second quarter

- (9:40) UND – Deng Deng 2-yard pass from Jerry Kaminski, C.J. Elrichs kick (Drive: 8 plays, 59 yards, 4:21; North Dakota 14–0)
- (0:55) UND – Sawyer Seidl 20-yard pass from Jerry Kaminski, C.J. Elrichs kick (Drive: 6 plays, 57 yards, 1:22; North Dakota 21–0)
- (0:00) C.J. Elrichs 38-yard field goal (Drive: 4 plays, 30 yards, 0:21; North Dakota 24–0)

Third quarter

- (11:59) VAL – Micah Mackay 67-yard pass from Rowan Keefe, Luke Scoma kick (Drive: 3 plays, 80 yards, 0:56; North Dakota 24–7)
- (11:47) UND – Sawyer Seidl 92-yard kickoff return, C.J. Elrichs kick (North Dakota 31–7)
- (7:40) UND – Simon Romfo 5-yard run, C.J. Elrichs kick (Drive: 5 plays, 44 yards, 2:26; North Dakota 38–7)
- (6:56) UND – Xavier Leigh 23-yard run, C.J. Elrichs kick (Drive: 2 plays, 27 yards, 0:35; North Dakota 45–7)
- (4:10) UND – C.J. Elrichs 38-yard field goal (Drive: 4 plays, 0 yards, 0:49; North Dakota 48–7)

Fourth quarter

- (13:27) UND – C.J. Elrichs 32-yard field goal (Drive: 9 plays, 48 yards, 3:20; North Dakota 51–7)
- (12:07) Javance Tupou'ata-Johnson 5-yard run, C.J. Elrichs kick (Drive: 1 play, 5 yards, 0:05; North Dakota 58–7)

Statistics	VAL	UND
First downs	6	24
Total yards	159	448
Rushing yards	48	228
Passing yards	111	220
Passing: Comp–Att–Int	8–19–1	18–30–0
Time of possession	30:16	29:44

Team	Category	Player	Statistics
Valparaiso	Passing	Rowan Keefe	8/15, 111 yards, TD, INT
Valparaiso	Rushing	Dawaiian McNeely	7 carries, 17 yards
Valparaiso	Receiving	Micah Mackay	1 reception, 67 yards, TD
North Dakota	Passing	Jerry Kaminski	13/19, 172 yards, 2 TD
North Dakota	Rushing	Xavier Leigh	8 carries, 64 yards, TD
North Dakota	Receiving	Nate DeMontagnac	4 receptions, 50 yards

==== at Northern Iowa ====
No. 15 North Dakota Fighting Hawks (2–2) vs. Northern Iowa Panthers (2–2) – Game summary

Quarter	1	2	3	4	Total
No. 15 Fighting Hawks	7	7	14	7	35
Panthers	0	0	0	7	7

at UNI-Dome, Cedar Falls, IA

- Date: October 4, 2025
- Game time: 4:00 pm
- Game weather: Indoors • Temperature: 70 °F (21 °C)
- Game attendance: 12,048
- Referee: Jason Perkins
- TV announcers (ESPN+): Brad Wells (play-by-play) and Justin Surrency (analyst)

Game information
First quarter
- (4:07) UND – Kaden Vig 63-yard fumble return, C.J. Elrichs kick (North Dakota 7–0)

Second quarter

- (1:08) UND – Nate DeMontagnac 20-yard pass from Jerry Kaminski, C.J. Elrichs kick (Drive: 7 plays, 84 yards, 2:03; North Dakota 14–0)

Third quarter

- (8:32) UND – B.J. Fleming 77-yard pass from Jerry Kaminski, C.J. Elrichs kick (Drive: 3 plays, 79 yards, 1:17; North Dakota 21–0)
- (4:29) UND – Sawyer Seidl 6-yard pass from Jerry Kaminski, C.J. Elrichs kick (Drive: 6 plays, 69 yards, 2:40; North Dakota 28–0)

Fourth quarter

- (6:23) UND – Deng Deng 12-yard pass from Jerry Kaminski, C.J. Elrichs kick (Drive: 5 plays, 66 yards, 2:19; North Dakota 35–0)
- (0:46) UNI – Derek Anderson 9-yard pass from Matthew Schecklman, Max Bartachek kick (Drive: 14 yards, 76 yards, 5:31; North Dakota 35–7)

Statistics	UND	UNI
First downs	20	22
Total yards	422	325
Rushing yards	176	124
Passing yards	246	201
Passing: Comp–Att–Int	20–23–0	27–41–1
Time of possession	23:37	36:23

Team	Category	Player	Statistics
North Dakota	Passing	Jerry Kaminski	20/23, 246 yards, 4 TD
North Dakota	Rushing	Gaven Ziebarth	7 carries, 62 yards
North Dakota	Receiving	B.J. Fleming	5 receptions, 134 yards, TD
Northern Iowa	Passing	Matthew Schecklman	27/40, 201 yards, TD, INT
Northern Iowa	Rushing	Bill Jackson	9 carries, 42 yards
Northern Iowa	Receiving	JC Roque Jr.	10 receptions, 73 yards

==== Youngstown State ====
Youngstown State Penguins (3–2) vs. No. 13 North Dakota Fighting Hawks (3–2) – Game summary

Quarter	1	2	3	4	Total
Penguins	0	7	10	0	17
No. 13 Fighting Hawks	14	14	0	7	35

at Alerus Center, Grand Forks, ND

- Date: October 11, 2025
- Game time: 3:00 pm
- Game weather: Indoors • Temperature: 72 °F (22 °C)
- Game attendance: 11,960
- Referee: Jason Berg
- TV announcers (ESPN+): Alex Heinert (play-by-play) and Ryan Kasowski (analyst)

Game information
First quarter
- (8:18) UND – B.J. Fleming 9-yard pass from Jerry Kaminski, C.J. Elrichs kick (Drive: 9 plays, 67 yards, 4:27; North Dakota 7–0)
- (2:44) UND – Haydn Stay 21-yard pass from Jerry Kaminski, C.J. Elrichs kick (Drive: 9 plays, 59 yards, 4:03; North Dakota 14–0)

Second quarter

- (13:27) YSU – Mike Solomon 20-yard pass from Beau Brungard, Andrew Lastovka kick (Drive: 8 plays, 42 yards, 4:08; North Dakota 14–7)
- (12:49) UND – Gaven Ziebarth 51-yard run, C.J. Elrichs kick (Drive: 2 plays, 58 yards, 0:32; North Dakota 21–7)
- (8:08) UND – B.J. Fleming 14-yard pass from Jerry Kaminski, C.J. Elrichs kick (Drive: 5 plays, 48 yards, 2:17; North Dakota 28–7)

Third quarter

- (7:44) YSU – Andrew Lastovka 34-yard field goal (Drive: 5 plays, 45 yards, 1:29; North Dakota 28–10)
- (4:22) YSU – Kylon Wilson 37-yard pass from Beau Brungard, Andrew Lastovka kick (Drive: 4 plays, 86 yards, 1:25; North Dakota 28–17)

Fourth quarter

- (6:40) UND – Gaven Ziebarth 1-yard run, C.J. Elrichs kick (Drive: 16 plays, 72 yards, 7:57; North Dakota 35–17)

Statistics	YSU	UND
First downs	17	21
Total yards	377	374
Rushing yards	108	228
Passing yards	269	146
Passing: Comp–Att–Int	18–33–0	17–27–0
Time of possession	28:04	31:56

Team	Category	Player	Statistics
Youngstown State	Passing	Beau Brungard	18/33, 269 yards, 2 TD
Youngstown State	Rushing	Beau Brungard	19 carries, 71 yards
Youngstown State	Receiving	Ky Wilson	4 receptions, 102 yards, TD
North Dakota	Passing	Jerry Kaminski	17/27, 146 yards, 3 TD
North Dakota	Rushing	Sawyer Seidl	20 carries, 114 yards
North Dakota	Receiving	B.J. Fleming	5 receptions, 84 yards, 2 TD

==== at No. 12 Southern Illinois ====
No. 9 North Dakota Fighting Hawks (4–2) vs. No. 12 Southern Illinois Salukis (4–2) – Game summary

Quarter	1	2	3	4	Total
No. 9 Fighting Hawks	7	21	7	3	38
No. 12 Salukis	0	0	7	12	19

at Saluki Stadium, Carbondale, IL

- Date: October 18, 2025
- Game time: 12:00 pm
- Game weather: Sunny • Temperature: 80 °F (27 °C) • Wind: SE at 10 miles per hour (16 km/h)
- Game attendance: 5,132
- Referee: John Shay
- TV: ESPN+

Game information
First quarter
- (9:52) UND – Sawyer Seidl 28-yard run, Kenten Laughman kick (Drive: 9 plays, 64 yards, 3:47; North Dakota 7–0)

Second quarter

- (13:28) UND – Sawyer Seidl 16-yard run, Kenten Laughman kick (Drive: 4 plays, 41 yards, 1:23; North Dakota 14–0)
- (6:47) UND – Jerry Kaminski 2-yard run, Kenten Laughman kick (Drive: 10 plays, 96 yards, 4:58; North Dakota 21–0)
- (0:13) UND – Sawyer Seidl 21-yard run, Kenten Laughman kick (Drive: 1 play, 21 yards, 0:07; North Dakota 28–0)

Third quarter

- (10:02) SIU – Chandler Chapman 4-yard run, Paul Geelen kick (Drive: 7 plays, 67 yards, 3:03; North Dakota 28–7)
- (2:39) UND – Sawyer Seidl 11-yard pass from Jerry Kaminski, Kenten Laughman kick (Drive: 14 plays, 75 yards, 7:23; North Dakota 35–7)

Fourth quarter

- (12:54) SIU – DJ Williams 1-yard run, two-point conversion pass failed (Drive: 12 plays, 65 yards, 4:45; North Dakota 35–13)
- (6:33) UND – Kenten Laughman 22-yard field goal (Drive: 8 plays, 44 yards, 4:49; North Dakota 38–13)
- (2:03) SIU – Tae Marrero Jr. 3-yard pass from DJ Williams, two-point conversion pass failed (Drive: 16 plays, 75 yards, 4:30; North Dakota 38–19)

Statistics	UND	SIU
First downs	22	20
Total yards	384	337
Rushing yards	311	79
Passing yards	73	258
Passing: Comp–Att–Int	9–15–0	29–46–1
Time of possession	32:00	28:00

Team	Category	Player	Statistics
North Dakota	Passing	Jerry Kaminski	9/15, 73 yards, TD
North Dakota	Rushing	Sawyer Seidl	14 carries, 108 yards, 3 TD
North Dakota	Receiving	Nate DeMontagnac	2 receptions, 30 yards
Southern Illinois	Passing	DJ Williams	29/46, 258 yards, TD, INT
Southern Illinois	Rushing	Chandler Chapman	15 carries, 68 yards, TD
Southern Illinois	Receiving	Fabian McCray	6 receptions, 97 yards

==== Indiana State ====
Indiana State Sycamores (2–5) vs. No. 8 North Dakota Fighting Hawks (5–2) – Game summary

Quarter	1	2	3	4	Total
Sycamores	3	0	7	7	17
No. 8 Fighting Hawks	7	17	20	2	46

at Alerus Center, Grand Forks, ND

- Date: October 25
- Game time: 3:00 pm
- Game weather: Sunny • Temperature: 72 °F (22 °C)
- Game attendance: 10,618
- Referee: Gregory Gompf
- TV announcers (ESPN+): Jody Norstedt (play-by-play) and Ryan Kasowski (analyst)

Game information
First quarter
- (8:30) UND – Sawyer Seidl 22-yard run, Kenten Laughman kick (Drive: 9 plays, 85 yards, 5:39; North Dakota 7–0)
- (3:58) INST – Sebastian Lopez 46-yard field goal (Drive: 12 plays, 39 yards, 5:03; North Dakota 7–3)

Second quarter

- (8:55) UND – Nathan Hromadka 3-yard pass from Jerry Kaminski, Kenten Laughman kick (Drive: 7 plays, 31 yards, 3:14; North Dakota 14–3)
- (4:29) UND – Jerry Kaminski 4-yard run, Kenten Laughman kick (Drive: 6 plays, 50 yards, 2:18; North Dakota 21–3)
- (0:28) UND – Kenten Laughman 29-yard field goal (Drive: 11 plays, 68 yards, 1:18; North Dakota 24–3)

Third quarter

- (9:48) UND – Sawyer Seidl 5-yard pass from Jerry Kaminski, two-point run conversion failed (Drive: 3 plays, 65 yards, 1:27; North Dakota 30–3)
- (8:48) INST – Keshon Singleton 7-yard pass from Brock Riddle, Sebastian Lopez kick (Drive: 4 plays, 75 yards, 1:00; North Dakota 30–10)
- (2:41) UND – Caden Dennis 26-yard pass from Jerry Kaminski, Kenten Laughman kick (Drive: 6 plays, 63 yards, 2:33; North Dakota 37–10)
- (0:25) UND – BJ Fleming 3-yard pass from Jerry Kaminski, Easton Choate kick (Drive: 3 plays, 15 yards, 1:08; North Dakota 44–10)

Fourth quarter

- (10:58) INST – Team safety (North Dakota 46–10)
- (4:53) INST – BJ Wuest 15-yard punt return, Sebastian Lopez kick (Drive: 3 plays, 1 yards, 1:29; North Dakota 46–17)

Statistics	INST	UND
First downs	10	25
Total yards	221	564
Rushing yards	63	264
Passing yards	158	300
Passing: Comp–Att–Int	10–34–3	22–39–1
Time of possession	25:26	34:34

Team	Category	Player	Statistics
Indiana State	Passing	Brock Riddle	3/12, 88 yards, TD, 2 INT
Indiana State	Rushing	Plez Lawrence	5 carries, 37 yards
Indiana State	Receiving	Rashad Rochelle	4 receptions, 113 yards
North Dakota	Passing	Jerry Kaminski	22/34, 300 yards, 4 TD, INT
North Dakota	Rushing	Sawyer Seidl	14 carries, 104 yards, TD
North Dakota	Receiving	Caden Dennis	5 receptions, 97 yards, TD

==== at South Dakota ====
No. 8 North Dakota (6–2) vs. South Dakota Coyotes (5–4) – Game summary

Quarter	1	2	3	4	Total
No. 8 Fighting Hawks	0	7	7	7	21
Coyotes	2	14	10	0	26

at DakotaDome, Vermillion, SD

- Date: November 1
- Game time: 1:00 pm
- Game weather: Indoors • Temperature: 72 °F (22 °C)
- Game attendance: 6,809
- Referee: Grant Henderson
- TV announcers (Midco Sports/ESPN+): Jay Elsen (play-by-play) and Andre Fields (analyst)

Game information
First quarter
- (3:38) SDAK – Team safety (South Dakota 2–0)

Second quarter

- (14:55) SDAK – L. J. Phillips Jr. 1-yard run, Will Leyland kick (Drive: 7 plays, 23 yards, 3:32; South Dakota 9–0)
- (11:18) UND – Sawyer Seidl 6-yard run, Kenten Laughman kick (Drive: 8 plays, 75 yards, 3:37; South Dakota 9–7)
- (0:45) SDAK – Larenzo Fenner 43-yard pass from Aidan Bouman, Will Leyland kick (Drive: 3 plays, 54 yards, 0:19; South Dakota 16–7)

Third quarter

- (9:55) SDAK – Will Leyland 36-yard field goal (Drive: 10 plays, 60 yards, 4:59; South Dakota 19–7)
- (7:11) SDAK – Dejuan Lewis 80-yard fumble recovery, Will Leyland kick (Drive: 6 plays, -40 yards, 2:37; South Dakota 26–7)
- (2:48) UND – Jerry Kaminski 11-yard run, Kenten Laughman kick (Drive: 11 plays, 75 yards, 4:23; South Dakota 26–14)

Fourth quarter

- (12:07) UND – Sawyer Seidl 41-yard run, Kenten Laughman kick (Drive: 4 plays, 59 yards, 1:58; South Dakota 26–21)

Statistics	UND	SDAK
First downs	24	17
Total yards	382	270
Rushing yards	205	97
Passing yards	177	173
Passing: Comp–Att–Int	16–30–2	14–20–0
Time of possession	28:50	31:10

Team	Category	Player	Statistics
North Dakota	Passing	Jerry Kaminski	16/30, 177 yards, 2 INT
North Dakota	Rushing	Sawyer Seidl	16 carries, 102 yards, 2 TD
North Dakota	Receiving	B.J. Fleming	5 receptions, 59 yards
South Dakota	Passing	Aidan Bouman	14/20, 173 yards, TD
South Dakota	Rushing	L. J. Phillips Jr.	24 carries, 106 yards, TD
South Dakota	Receiving	Larenzo Fenner	2 receptions, 83 yards, TD

==== No. 1 North Dakota State ====
No. 1 North Dakota State Bison (9–0) vs. No. 13 North Dakota Fighting Hawks (6–3) – Game summary

Quarter	1	2	3	4	Total
No. 1 Bison	0	6	3	6	15
No. 13 Fighting Hawks	7	0	3	0	10

at Alerus Center, Grand Forks, ND

- Date: November 8, 2025
- Game time: 1:00 pm
- Game weather: Indoors • Temperature: 70 °F (21 °C)
- Game attendance: 12,749
- Referee: Jason Perkins
- TV announcers (ESPN+): Alex Heinert (play-by-play) and Ryan Kasowski (analyst)

Game information
First quarter
- (2:52) UND – Sawyer Seidl 2-yard run, Kenten Laughman kick (Drive: 2 plays, 11 yards, 0:27; North Dakota 7–0)

Second quarter

- (12:46) NDSU – Eli Ozick 24-yard field goal (Drive: 13 plays, 72 yards, 5:01; North Dakota 7–3)
- (2:28) NDSU – Eli Ozick 38-yard field goal (Drive: 7 plays, 60 yards, 4:05; North Dakota 7–6)

Third quarter

- (7:13) UND – Kenten Laughman 32-yard field goal (Drive: 14 plays, 60 yards, 7:47; North Dakota 10–6)
- (1:09) NDSU – Eli Ozick 33-yard field goal (Drive: 4 plays, 6 yards, 1:30; North Dakota 10–9)

Fourth quarter

- (2:22) NDSU – Cole Payton 8-yard run (Drive: 4 plays, 49 yards, 2:02; North Dakota State 15–10)

Statistics	NDSU	UND
First downs	10	23
Total yards	268	286
Rushing yards	143	116
Passing yards	125	170
Passing: Comp–Att–Int	8–15–1	21–38–3
Time of possession	25:18	34:42

Team	Category	Player	Statistics
North Dakota State	Passing	Cole Payton	8/15, 125 yards, INT
North Dakota State	Rushing	Barika Kpeenu	18 carries, 73 yards
North Dakota State	Receiving	Bryce Lance	3 receptions, 61 yards
North Dakota	Passing	Jerry Kaminski	21/38, 170 yards, 3 INT
North Dakota	Rushing	Sawyer Seidl	23 carries, 68 yards, TD
North Dakota	Receiving	B.J. Fleming	6 receptions, 53 yards

==== at Murray State ====
No. 13 North Dakota (6–4) vs. Murray State Racers (0–10) – Game summary

Quarter	1	2	3	4	Total
No. 13 Fighting Hawks	7	0	14	14	35
Racers	0	9	0	8	17

at Roy Stewart Stadium, Murray, KY

- Date: November 15
- Game time: 11:00 am
- Game weather: Sunny • Temperature: 72 °F (22 °C) • Wind: NE at 16 miles per hour (26 km/h)
- Game attendance: 6,783
- Referee: Tyler Downs
- TV: Midco Sports/ESPN+

Game information
First quarter
- (11:02) UND – B.J. Fleming 15-yard pass from Jerry Kaminski, Kenten Laughman kick (Drive: 10 plays, 91 yards, 5:27; North Dakota 7–0)

Second quarter

- (13:17) MUR – Jack Tannehill 33-yard field goal (Drive: 14 plays, 58 yards, 7:11; North Dakota 7–3)
- (6:10) MUR – Jack Tannehill 36-yard field goal (Drive: 11 plays, 31 yards, 6:21; North Dakota 7–6)
- (0:03) MUR – Jack Tannehill 41-yard field goal (Drive: 7 plays, 39 yards, 1:04; Murray State 9–7)

Third quarter

- (10:17) UND – Sawyer Seidl 3-yard run, Kenten Laughman kick (Drive: 12 plays, 61 yards, 4:37; North Dakota 14–9)
- (6:56) UND – Jonnie Wiltshire 30-yard interception, Kenten Laughman kick (North Dakota 21–9)

Fourth quarter

- (10:22) UND – Colton Brunell 1-yard run, Kenten Laughman kick (Drive: 11 plays, 63 yards, 4:23; North Dakota 28–9)
- (5:54) MUR – Baxton Wright 8-yard run, J'Kalon Carter pass to Huseyin Simsir for two-point conversion (Drive: 11 plays, 63 yards, 4:23; North Dakota 28–17)
- (3:08) UND – Jerry Kaminski 28-yard run, Kenten Laughman kick (Drive: 5 plays, 47 yards, 2:45; North Dakota 35–17)

Statistics	UND	MUR
First downs	20	18
Total yards	344	252
Rushing yards	213	112
Passing yards	131	140
Passing: Comp–Att–Int	11–18–1	23–34–1
Time of possession	29:32	30:28

Team	Category	Player	Statistics
North Dakota	Passing	Jerry Kaminski	11/18, 131 yards, TD, INT
North Dakota	Rushing	Sawyer Seidl	22 carries, 98 yards, TD
North Dakota	Receiving	B.J. Fleming	4 receptions, 61 yards, TD
Murray State	Passing	Baxter Wright	23/34, 140 yards, INT
Murray State	Rushing	Jawaun Northington	11 carries, 56 yards
Murray State	Receiving	Darius Cannon	8 receptions, 49 yards

==== No. 22 South Dakota State ====
No. 22 South Dakota State Jackrabbits (7–4) vs. No. 13 North Dakota Fighting Hawks (7–4) – Game summary

Quarter	1	2	3	4	OT	Total
No. 22 Jackrabbits	0	7	14	7	6	34
No. 13 Fighting Hawks	14	3	3	8	3	31

at Alerus Center, Grand Forks, ND

- Date: November 22, 2025
- Game time: 1:00 pm
- Game weather: Indoors • Temperature: 72 °F (22 °C)
- Game attendance: 11,396
- Referee: David Hergert
- TV: ESPN+

Game information
First quarter
- (2:59) UND – Jerry Kaminski 14-yard run, Kenten Laughman kick (Drive: 8 plays, 98 yards, 3:53; North Dakota 7–0)
- (1:10) UND – B.J. Fleming 89-yard pass from Jerry Kaminski, Kenten Laughman kick (Drive: 1 play, 89 yards, 0:10; North Dakota 14–0)

Second quarter

- (6:21) SDST – Josiah Johnson 8-yard run, Eli Stader kick (Drive: 17 plays, 80 yards, 9:47; North Dakota 14–7)
- (0:59) UND – Kenten Laughman 20-yard field goal (Drive: 9 plays, 40 yards, 2:34; North Dakota 17–7)

Third quarter

- (3:54) UND – Kenten Laughman 29-yard field goal (Drive: 7 plays, 29 yards, 2:52; North Dakota 20–7)
- (1:19) SDST – Greyton Gannon 42-yard pass from Jack Henry, Eli Stader kick (Drive: 6 plays, 65 yards, 2:35; North Dakota 20–14)
- (0:35) SDST – Josiah Johnson 6-yard run, Eli Stader kick (Drive: 6 plays, 64 yards, 3:38; South Dakota State 21–20)

Fourth quarter

- (6:30) Josiah Johnson 1-yard run, Eli Stader kick (Drive: 6 plays, 64 yards, 3:38; South Dakota State 28–20)
- (1:52) UND – Nate DeMontagnac 16-yard pass from Jerry Kaminski, Jerry Kaminski pass to Sawyer Seidl for 2-point conversion (Drive: 11 plays, 85 yards, 4:31; Tied 28–28)

Overtime

- UND – Kenten Laughman 40-yard field goal (Drive: 4 plays, 2 yards; North Dakota 31–28)
- SDST – Grahm Goering 23-yard pass from Jack Henry (Drive: 3 plays, 25 yards; South Dakota State 34–31)

Statistics	SDST	UND
First downs	19	18
Total yards	334	367
Rushing yards	202	75
Passing yards	132	292
Passing: Comp–Att–Int	6–17–2	20–33–1
Time of possession	35:57	24:03

Team	Category	Player	Statistics
South Dakota State	Passing	Jack Henry	6/17, 132 yards, 2 TD, 2 INT
South Dakota State	Rushing	Julius Loughridge	24 carries, 112 yards
South Dakota State	Receiving	Alex Bullock	2 receptions, 58 yards
North Dakota	Passing	Jerry Kaminski	20/33, 292 yards, 2 TD, INT
North Dakota	Rushing	Jerry Kaminski	14 carries, 34 yards, TD
North Dakota	Receiving	B.J. Fleming	4 receptions, 123 yards, TD

=== NCAA Division I playoffs ===
==== at No. 6 Tennessee Tech (NCAA Division I Playoffs – First round) ====
2025 NCAA Division I FCS Playoffs First Round
No. 19 North Dakota Fighting Hawks (7–5) vs. No. 6 Tennessee Tech Golden Eagles (11–1) – Game summary

Quarter	1	2	3	4	Total
No. 19 Fighting Hawks	3	7	0	21	31
No. 6 Golden Eagles	0	0	6	0	6

at Tucker Stadium, Cookeville, TN

- Date: November 29, 2025
- Game time: 12:00 pm
- Game weather: Sunny
- Game attendance: 4,641
- Referee: Kelly Holman
- TV: ESPN+

Game information
First quarter
- (3:46) UND – Kenten Laughman 37-yard field goal (Drive: 9 plays, 33 yards, 3:27; North Dakota 3–0)

Second quarter

- (2:15) UND – Deng Deng 21-yard pass from Jerry Kaminski, Kenten Laughman kick (Drive: 3 plays, 20 yards, 0:46; North Dakota 10–0)

Third quarter

- (11:28) TNTC – Brian Courtney 45-yard pass from Kekoa Visperas, Dom LeBlanc kick blocked (Drive: 4 plays, 60 yards, 1:11; North Dakota 10–6)

Fourth quarter

- (11:48) UND – Colton Brunell 8-yard run, Kenten Laughman kick (Drive: 9 plays, 50 yards, 4:17; North Dakota 17–6)
- (9:19) UND – Gaven Ziebarth 3-yard run, Kenten Laughman kick (Drive: 4 plays, 25 yards, 1:45; North Dakota 24–6)
- (3:15) UND – Charles Langama 18-yard run, Kenten Laughman kick (Drive: 6 plays, 49 yards, 3:44; North Dakota 31–6)

Statistics	UND	TNTC
First downs	18	18
Total yards	346	302
Rushing yards	200	24
Passing yards	146	278
Passing: Comp–Att–Int	16–26–1	30–51–2
Time of possession	34:56	25:04

Team	Category	Player	Statistics
North Dakota	Passing	Jerry Kaminski	9/18, 98 yards, TD, INT
North Dakota	Rushing	Gavin Ziebarth	11 carries, 66 yards, TD
North Dakota	Receiving	Deng Deng	5 receptions, 73 yards, TD
Tennessee Tech	Passing	Kekoa Visperas	30/51, 278 yards, 2 TD, INT
Tennessee Tech	Rushing	Quintell Quinn	5 carries, 11 yards
Tennessee Tech	Receiving	Brian Courtney	3 receptions, 61 yards, TD

==== at No. 5 Tarleton State (NCAA Division I Playoffs – Second round) ====
2025 NCAA Division I FCS Playoffs Second Round
No. 19 North Dakota Fighting Hawks (8–5) vs. No. 5 Tarleton State Texans (11–1) – Game summary

Quarter	1	2	3	4	Total
No. 19 Fighting Hawks	0	7	0	6	13
No. 5 Texans	3	10	11	7	31

at Memorial Stadium, Stephenville, TX

- Date: December 6, 2025
- Game time: 12:00 pm
- Game weather: Sunny
- Game attendance: 19,742
- Referee: Justin Ackley
- TV: ESPN+

Game information
First quarter
- (6:56) TAR – Brad Larson 21-yard field goal (Drive: 15 plays, 87 yards, 6:39; Tarleton State 3–0)

Second quarter

- (14:56) TAR – Brad Larson 39-yard field goal (Drive: 4 plays, 1 yard, 0:27; Tarleton State 6–0)
- (12:28) TAR – T'iar Young 3-yard pass from Victor Gabalis, Brad Larson kick (Drive: 2 plays, 31 yards, 0:39; Tarleton State 13–0)
- (10:21) UND – Sawyer Seidl 3-yard run, C.J. Elrichs kick (Drive: 2 plays, 10 yards, 0:42; Tarleton State 13–7)

Third quarter

- (13:16) TAR – Peyton Kramer 64-yard pass from Victor Gabalis, Tylan Hines run for two-point conversion (Drive: 4 plays, 75 yards, 1:44; Tarleton State 21–7)
- (3:08) TAR – Brad Larson 26-yard field goal (Drive: 14 plays, 55 yards, 7:07; Tarleton State 24–7)

'Fourth quarter

- (11:15) UND – Sawyer Seidl 5-yard run, Jerry Kaminski conversion pass failed (Drive: 4 plays, 62 yards, 1:57; Tarleton State 24–13)
- (10:28) TAR – Marquis Willis 77-yard pass from Victor Gabalis, Brad Larson kick (Drive: 1 play, 72 yards, 0:43; Tarleton State 31–13)

Statistics	UND	TAR
First downs	13	20
Total yards	248	437
Rushing yards	136	145
Passing yards	112	292
Passing: Comp–Att–Int	11–28–2	15–25–1
Time of possession	22:51	37:09

Team	Category	Player	Statistics
North Dakota	Passing	Jerry Kaminski	11/28, 112 yards, 2 INT
North Dakota	Rushing	Jerry Kaminski	11 carries, 63 yards
North Dakota	Receiving	B.J. Fleming	3 receptions, 47 yards
Tarleton State	Passing	Victor Gabalis	15/25, 292 yards, 3 TD, INT
Tarleton State	Rushing	Tylan Hines	28 carries, 120 yards
Tarleton State	Receiving	Marquis Willis	4 receptions, 133 yards, TD
