= 2025 Indiana State Sycamores football team =

American college football season

2025 Indiana State Sycamores football
- Conference: Missouri Valley Football Conference
- Record: 3–9 (1–7 MVFC)
- Head coach: Curt Mallory (8th season)
- Offensive coordinator: John Bear (1st season)
- Defensive coordinator: David Elson (1st season)
- Home stadium: Memorial Stadium

2025 Missouri Valley Football Conference standings
	Conf.			Overall
Team	W		L	W		L
No. 4т North Dakota State $^	8	–	0	12	–	1
No. 9 South Dakota ^	6	–	2	10	–	5
No. 2 Illinois State ^	5	–	3	12	–	5
No. 14 North Dakota ^	5	–	3	8	–	6
No. 18 Youngstown State ^	5	–	3	8	–	5
No. 13 South Dakota State ^	4	–	4	9	–	5
No. 25 Southern Illinois	4	–	4	7	–	5
Northern Iowa	1	–	7	3	–	9
Murray State	1	–	7	1	–	11
Indiana State	1	–	7	3	–	9
$ – Conference champion; ^ – FCS playoff participant; Rankings from STATS Poll

The 2025 Indiana State Sycamores football team represented Indiana State University as a member of the Missouri Valley Football Conference (MVFC) during the 2025 NCAA Division I FCS football season. Led by eighth-year head coach Curt Mallory, the Sycamores compiled an overall record of 3–9 with a mark of 1–7 in conference play, placing in a three-way tie for eighth place at the bottom of the MVFC standings. Indiana State played home games at Memorial Stadium in Terre Haute, Indiana.

== Schedule ==
Date	Time	Opponent	Site	TV	Result	Attendance
August 28	6:00 p.m.	McKendree*	Memorial Stadium; Terre Haute, IN	ESPN+	W 41–24	3,206
September 6	1:00 p.m.	Eastern Illinois*	Memorial Stadium; Terre Haute, IN	ESPN+	W 38–14	5,281
September 12	6:30 p.m.	at No. 22 (FBS) Indiana*	Memorial Stadium; Bloomington, IN	BTN	L 0–73	46,219
September 20	3:00 p.m.	at No. 5 Montana*	Washington–Grizzly Stadium; Missoula, MT	ESPN+	L 20–63	26,193
October 4	7:00 p.m.	at No. 10 Southern Illinois	Saluki Stadium; Carbondale, IL	ESPN+	L 27–55	10,132
October 11	1:00 p.m.	No. 23 South Dakota^{†}	Memorial Stadium; Terre Haute, IN	ESPN+	L 14–19	5,373
October 18	1:00 p.m.	No. 1 North Dakota State	Memorial Stadium; Terre Haute, IN	ESPN+	L 7–38	3,252
October 25	4:00 p.m.	at No. 8 North Dakota	Alerus Center; Grand Forks, ND	ESPN+	L 17–46	10,618
November 1	3:00 p.m.	at No. 4т South Dakota State	Dana J. Dykhouse Stadium; Brookings, SD	ESPN+	W 24–12	15,842
November 8	1:00 p.m.	No. 16 Illinois State	Memorial Stadium; Terre Haute, IN	ESPN+	L 20–52	3,522
November 15	12:00 p.m.	at No. 20 Youngstown State	Stambaugh Stadium; Youngstown, OH	ESPN+	L 29–48	7,392
November 22	1:00 p.m.	Murray State	Memorial Stadium; Terre Haute, IN	ESPN+	L 17–31	2,834
*Non-conference game; ^{†}Homecoming; Rankings from STATS Poll released prior to the game; All times are in Eastern time

== Preseason ==
=== MVFC poll ===
The Missouri Valley Football Conference released its preseason poll on July 21, 2025, voted on by league athletic directors, coaches, and media members. The Sycamores were predicted to finish ninth in the conference.

== Game summaries ==
=== McKendree ===
McKendree Bearcats (0–0) at Indiana State Sycamores (0–0) – Game summary

Quarter	1	2	3	4	Total
Bearcats	3	9	0	12	24
Sycamores	3	10	21	7	41

at Memorial Stadium, Terre Haute, IN

- Date: August 28
- Game time: 6:00 p.m.
- Game weather: Sunny • Temperature: 79 °F (26 °C) • Wind: NE at 7 miles per hour (11 km/h)
- Game attendance: 3,206
- Referee: Carl Chapman
- TV announcers (ESPN+): Joey O'Rourke (play-by-play) and Jim Leisure (analyst)

Game information
First quarter
- (11:38) INST – Sebastian Lopez 40-yard field goal (Drive: 5 plays, 25 yards, 1:34; Indiana State 3–0)
- (2:35) MCK – Chase Reeves 24-yard field goal (Drive: 16 plays, 73 yards, 6:53; Tied 3–3)

Second quarter

- (8:01) INST – Bryan Domino 22-yard pass from Elijah Owens, Sebastian Lopez kick (Drive: 10 plays, 72 yards, 3:53; Indiana State 10–3)
- (4:39) INST – Sebastian Lopez 28-yard field goal (Drive: 6 plays, 16 yards, 2:13; Indiana State 13–3)
- (1:48) MCK – Eddie Clark 2-yard run, Chase Reeves kick (Drive: 5 plays, 19 yards, 1:45; Indiana State 13–10)
- (0:43) MCK – Team safety (Indiana State 13–12)

Third quarter

- (9:23) INST – Plez Lawrence 17-yard run, Sebastian Lopez kick (Drive: 8 plays, 77 yards, 3:08; Indiana State 20–12)
- (4:13) INST – Nick Osho 4-yard run, Sebastian Lopez kick (Drive: 12 plays, 43 yards, 4:13; Indiana State 27–12)
- (0:14) INST – Plez Lawrence 75-yard pass from Elijah Owens, Sebastian Lopez kick (Drive: 2 plays, 88 yards, 0:37; Indiana State 34–12)

Fourth quarter

- (10:43) MCK – Quincy Hall Jr. 20-yard pass from Ty Michael, Chase Reeves kick blocked (Drive: 12 plays, 75 yards, 4:31; Indiana State 34–18)
- (4:54) MCK – Brylan Apholone 22-yard pass from Ty Michael, Ty Michael conversion pass failed (Drive: 7 plays, 64 yards, 3:47; Indiana State 34–24)
- (0:52) INST – Plez Lawrence 4-yard run, Sebastian Lopez kick (Drive: 10 plays, 73 yards, 3:54; Indiana State 41–24)

Statistics	MCK	INST
First downs	22	27
Total yards	325	469
Rushing yards	137	219
Passing yards	188	250
Passing: Comp–Att–Int	16–40–2	19–27–1
Time of possession	29:58	30:02

Team	Category	Player	Statistics
McKendree	Passing	Ty Michael	7/14, 115 yards, 2 TD
McKendree	Rushing	Eddie Clark	21 carries, 74 yards, TD
McKendree	Receiving	Quincy Hall Jr.	5 receptions, 69 yards, TD
Indiana State	Passing	Elijah Owens	19/27, 250 yards, 2 TD, INT
Indiana State	Rushing	Plez Lawrence	21 carries, 133 yards, 2 TD
Indiana State	Receiving	Plez Lawrence	4 receptions, 92 yards, TD

=== Eastern Illinois ===
Eastern Illinois Panthers (1–0) at Indiana State Sycamores (1–0) – Game summary

Quarter	1	2	3	4	Total
Panthers	0	0	7	7	14
Sycamores	7	10	7	14	38

at Memorial Stadium, Terre Haute, IN

- Date: September 6
- Game time: 1:00 p.m.
- Game weather: Sunny
- Game attendance: 5,281
- Referee: Chris Rick
- TV announcers (ESPN+): Joey O'Rourke (play-by-play) and Jim Leisure (analyst)

Game information
First quarter
- (12:06) INST – Aaron Ball 3-yard run, Sebastian Lopez kick (Drive: 7 plays, 80 yards, 2:48; Indiana State 7–0)
- (11:18) EIU – Charles Kellom 76-yard run, Drew Schiller kick (Drive: 2 plays, 82 yards, 0:44; Tied 7–7)
- (0:10) INST – Elijah Owens 1-yard run, Sebastian Lopez kick (Drive: 6 plays, 59 yards, 2:51; Indiana State 14–7)

Second quarter

- (7:50) INST – Dane Partridge 35-yard pass from Elijah Owens, Sebastian Lopez kick (Drive: 10 plays, 99 yards, 3:22; Indiana State 21–7)
- (0:07) INST – Aaron Ball 1-yard pass from Elijah Owens, Sebastian Lopez kick (Drive: 6 plays, 80 yards, 0:42; Indiana State 28–7)

Third quarter

- (11:11) INST – BJ Wuest 42-yard pass from Elijah Owens, Sebastian Lopez kick (Drive: 3 plays, 53 yards, 0:52; Indiana State 35–7)
- (4:23) EIU – Jeremy Reeves 21-yard pass from Cole LaCrue, Drew Schiller kick (Drive: 11 plays, 74 yards, 6:48; Indiana State 35–14)
- (1:23) EIU – Cole LaCrue 8-yard run, Drew Schiller kick (Drive: 3 plays, 64 yards, 1:19; Indiana State 35–21)

Fourth quarter

- (10:40) INST – Elijah Owens 15-yard run, Sebastian Lopez kick (Drive: 8 plays, 91 yards, 3:21; Indiana State 42–21)
- (6:16) EIU – Jacarre Fleming-Page 7-yard pass from Cole LaCrue, Drew Schiller kick (Drive: 12 plays, 75 yards, 4:24; Indiana State 42–28)
- (4:03) EIU – Charles Kellom 8-yard pass from Cole LaCrue, Drew Schiller kick (Drive: 2 plays, 13 yards, 0:46; Indiana State 42–35)

Statistics	EIU	INST
First downs	18	22
Total yards	239	412
Rushing yards	89	211
Passing yards	150	201
Passing: Comp–Att–Int	16–25–1	21–28–0
Time of possession	35:00	25:00

Team	Category	Player	Statistics
Eastern Illinois	Passing	Connor Wolf	9/13, 112 yards
Eastern Illinois	Rushing	Charles Kellom	23 carries, 86 yards, 2 TD
Eastern Illinois	Receiving	Carlyun Neal	2 receptions, 37 yards
Indiana State	Passing	Keegan Patterson	11/17, 111 yards, 2 TD
Indiana State	Rushing	Keegan Patterson	5 carries, 78 yards
Indiana State	Receiving	Larry Stephens III	5 receptions, 63 yards, TD

=== at No. 22 (FBS) Indiana ===
Indiana State Sycamores (2–0) at No. 22 (FBS) Indiana Hoosiers (2–0) – Game summary

Quarter	1	2	3	4	Total
Sycamores	0	0	0	0	0
No. 22 (FBS) Hoosiers	21	24	21	7	73

at Memorial Stadium, Bloomington, IN

- Date: September 12
- Game time: 6:30 p.m.
- Game weather: Sunny • Temperature: 83 °F (28 °C) • Wind: NE at 2 miles per hour (3.2 km/h)
- Game attendance: 46,219
- Referee: Kole Knueppel
- TV announcers (BTN): Lisa Byington (play-by-play), Jared Thomas (analyst), and Melanie Ricks (sideline reporter)

Game information
First quarter
- (11:22) IU – Fernando Mendoza 7-yard run, Nico Radicic kick (Drive: 7 plays, 66 yards, 3:30; Indiana 7–0)
- (4:42) IU – Omar Cooper Jr. 13-yard pass from Fernando Mendoza, Nico Radicic kick (Drive: 9 plays, 78 yards, 5:13; Indiana 14–0)
- (1:07) IU – Omar Cooper Jr. 13-yard pass from Fernando Mendoza, Nico Radicic kick (Drive: 5 plays, 31 yards, 2:02; Indiana 21–0)

Second quarter

- (10:28) IU – Nico Radicic 25-yard field goal (Drive: 8 plays, 37 yards, 3:37; Indiana 24–0)
- (7:56) IU – Holden Staes 18-yard pass from Fernando Mendoza, Nico Radicic kick (Drive: 3 plays, 65 yards, 1:24; Indiana 31–0)
- (5:03) IU – Jonathan Brady 4-yard pass from Fernando Mendoza, Nico Radicic kick (Drive: 2 plays, 35 yards, 0:33; Indiana 38–0)
- (1:51) IU – Omar Cooper Jr. 31-yard pass from Fernando Mendoza, Nico Radicic kick (Drive: 3 plays, 45 yards, 0:36; Indiana 45–0)

Third quarter

- (11:51) IU – Omar Cooper Jr. 58-yard pass from Alberto Mendoza, Nico Radicic kick (Drive: 4 plays, 72 yards, 1:22; Indiana 52–0)
- (6:15) IU – Jonathan Brady 12-yard pass from Alberto Mendoza, Nico Radicic kick (Drive: 8 plays, 70 yards, 3:46; Indiana 59–0)
- (1:22) IU – Khobie Martin 20-yard run, Nico Radicic kick (Drive: 5 plays, 61 yards, 2:51; Indiana 66–0)

Fourth quarter

- (2:18) IU – Khobie Martin 1-yard run, Nico Radicic kick (Drive: 10 plays, 80 yards, 6:13; Indiana 73–0)

Statistics	INST	IU
First downs	5	33
Plays–yards	59–77	67–680
Rushes–yards	31–39	37–301
Passing yards	38	379
Passing: comp–att–int	11–20–0	26–30–0
Turnovers	0	0
Time of possession	26:08	33:37

Team	Category	Player	Statistics
Indiana State	Passing	Brock Riddle	3/4, 25 yards
Indiana State	Rushing	Angelo St. Louis	5 carries, 22 yards
Indiana State	Receiving	Keshon Singleton	1 reception, 17 yards
Indiana	Passing	Fernando Mendoza	19/20, 270 yards, 5 TD
Indiana	Rushing	Khobie Martin	11 carries, 109 yards, 2 TD
Indiana	Receiving	Omar Cooper Jr.	10 receptions, 207 yards, 4 TD

=== at No. 5 Montana ===
Indiana State Sycamores (2–1) at No. 5 Montana Grizzlies (2–0) – Game summary

Quarter	1	2	3	4	Total
Sycamores	7	0	0	13	20
No. 5 Grizzlies	14	21	14	14	63

at Washington–Grizzly Stadium, Missoula, MT

- Date: September 20
- Game time: 3:00 p.m.
- Game weather: Sunny • Temperature: 76 °F (24 °C)
- Game attendance: 26,193
- Referee: Kelly Holman
- TV announcers (ESPN+): Trey Bender (play-by-play), Jordan Tripp (analyst) and Kyle Hansen (sideline)

Game information
First quarter
- (4:54) MONT – Eli Gillman 69-yard run, Ty Morrison kick (Drive: 1 play, 69 yards, 0:12; Montana 7–0)
- (3:55) INST – Rashad Rochelle 51-yard pass from Keegan Patterson, Sebastian Lopez kick (Drive: 4 plays, 75 yards, 1:21; Tied 7–7)
- (0:00) MONT – Eli Gillman 4-yard run, Ty Morrison kick (Drive: 10 plays, 75 yards, 3:55; Montana 14–7)

Second quarter

- (9:51) MONT – Keali'i Ah Yat 14-yard run, Ty Morrison kick (Drive: 10 plays, 74 yards, 4:41; Montana 21–7)
- (4:47) MONT – TJ Rausch 0-yard fumble recovery, Ty Morrison kick (Montana 28–7)
- (1:33) MONT – Josh Gale 19-yard pass from Keali'i Ah Yat, Ty Morrison kick (Drive: 5 plays, 82 yards, 1:29; Montana 35–7)

Third quarter

- (14:01) MONT – Eli Gillman 23-yard run, Ty Morrison kick (Drive: 2 plays, 25 yards, 0:25; Montana 42–7)
- (9:40) MONT – Jordan Dever 62-yard pass from Keali'i Ah Yat, Ty Morrison kick (Drive: 5 plays, 92 yards, 1:53; Montana 49–7)

Fourth quarter

- (13:36) MONT – Malae Fonoti 12-yard run, Jo Silver kick (Drive: 15 plays, 80 yards, 8:16; Montana 56–7)
- (12:14) INST – Nick Osho 55-yard run, Sebastian Lopez kick blocked (Drive: 4 plays, 75 yards, 1:22; Montana 56–13)
- (5:41) MONT – Tommy Running Rabbit 12-yard run, Jo Silver kick (Drive: 11 plays, 74 yards, 6:26; Montana 63–13)
- (5:21) INST – Nick Osho 79-yard run, Sebastian Lopez kick (Drive: 1 play, 79 yards, 0:13; Montana 63–20)

Statistics	INST	MONT
First downs	12	33
Plays–yards	58–387	81–647
Rushes–yards	30–198	51–303
Passing yards	189	344
Passing: Comp–Att–Int	15–28–1	24–30–0
Turnovers	2	0
Time of possession	23:18	38:22

Team	Category	Player	Statistics
Indiana State	Passing	Keegan Patterson	15/27, 189 yards, TD, INT
Indiana State	Rushing	Nick Osho	5 carries, 134 yards, 2 TD
Indiana State	Receiving	Rashad Rochelle	4 receptions, 75 yards, TD
Montana	Passing	Keali'i Ah Yat	22/27, 313 yards, 2 TD
Montana	Rushing	Eli Gillman	13 carries, 120 yards, 3 TD
Montana	Receiving	Michael Wortham	5 receptions, 78 yards

=== at No. 10 Southern Illinois ===
Indiana State Sycamores (2–2) vs. No. 10 Southern Illinois Salukis (3–1) – Game summary

Quarter	1	2	3	4	Total
Sycamores	7	7	6	7	27
No. 10 Salukis	21	17	7	10	55

at Saluki Stadium, Carbondale, IL

- Date: October 4
- Game time: 7:00 p.m.
- Game weather: Sunny • Temperature: 78 °F (26 °C) • Wind: NW at 8 miles per hour (13 km/h)
- Game attendance: 10,132
- Referee: David Hergert
- TV announcers (ESPN+): Larry Larson (play-by-play) and Kerry Martin (analyst)

Game information
First quarter
- (14:06) SIU – Jay Jones 20-yard pass from DJ Williams, Paul Geelen kick (Drive: 4 plays, 75 yards, 0:54; Southern Illinois 7–0)
- (9:58) SIU – Chandler Chapman 39-yard run, Paul Geelen kick (Drive: 6 plays, 76 yards, 2:57; Southern Illinois 14–0)
- (7:00) SIU – DJ Williams 1-yard run, Paul Geelen kick (Drive: 4 plays, 69 yards, 2:15; Southern Illinois 21–0)
- (2:40) INST – Keegan Patterson 9-yard run, Sebastian Lopez kick (Drive: 11 plays, 75 yards, 4:20; Southern Illinois 21–7)

Second quarter

- (13:28) SIU – Paul Geelen 40-yard field goal (Drive: 11 plays, 53 yards, 4:12; Southern Illinois 24–7)
- (9:36) SIU – Vinson Davis III 83-yard pass from DJ Williams, Paul Geelen kick (Drive: 3 plays, 89 yards, 0:49; Southern Illinois 31–7)
- (8:24) INST – Nick Osho 39-yard run, Sebastian Lopez kick (Drive: 3 plays, 75 yards, 1:12; Southern Illinois 31–14)
- (0:08) SIU – DJ Williams 3-yard run, Paul Geelen kick (Drive: 10 plays, 68 yards, 1:47; Southern Illinois 38–14)

Third quarter

- (3:58) INST – Nick Osho 66-yard run, Brock Riddle two-point conversion pass failed (Drive: 7 plays, 92 yards, 2:13; Southern Illinois 38–20)
- (0:34) SIU – Chandler Chapman 5-yard run, Paul Geelen kick (Drive: 6 plays, 31 yards, 3:20; Southern Illinois 45–20)

Fourth quarter

- (12:19) SIU – Paul Geelen 33-yard field goal (Drive: 6 plays, 8 yards, 2:35; Southern Illinois 48–20)
- (10:22) SIU – Edward Robinson 81-yard run, Paul Geelen kick (Drive: 2 plays, 81 yards, 0:18; Southern Illinois 55–20)
- (2:05) INST – Brock Riddle 14-yard run, Sebastian Lopez kick (Drive: 7 plays, 92 yards, 2:13; Southern Illinois 55–27)

Statistics	INST	SIU
First downs	23	25
Total yards	446	656
Rushing yards	322	430
Passing yards	124	226
Passing: Comp–Att–Int	13–26–1	19–34–0
Time of possession	30:04	29:56

Team	Category	Player	Statistics
Indiana State	Passing	Brock Riddle	7/17, 80 yards, INT
Indiana State	Rushing	Nick Osho	28 carries, 211 yards, 2 TD
Indiana State	Receiving	Zack Drawdy Jr.	4 receptions, 58 yards
Southern Illinois	Passing	DJ Williams	19/31, 226 yards, 2 TD
Southern Illinois	Rushing	Edward Robinson	9 carries, 124 yards, TD
Southern Illinois	Receiving	Vinson Davis III	7 receptions, 140 yards, TD

=== No. 23 South Dakota ===
No. 23 South Dakota Coyotes (3–3) vs. Indiana State Sycamores (2–3) – Game summary

Quarter	1	2	3	4	Total
No. 23 Coyotes	3	10	3	3	19
Sycamores	0	7	0	7	14

at Memorial Stadium, Terre Haute, IN

- Date: October 11
- Game time: 1:00 p.m.
- Game weather: Sunny
- Game attendance: 5,373
- Referee: John Shay
- TV announcers (ESPN+): Brendan King (play-by-play) and Austin Osborne (analyst)

Game information
First quarter
- (2:08) SDAK – Will Leyland 32-yard field goal (Drive: 15 plays, 58 yards, 9:36; South Dakota 3–0)

Second quarter

- (4:25) SDAK – L. J. Phillips Jr. 1-yard run, Will Leyland kick (Drive: 10 plays, 57 yards, 5:00; South Dakota 10–0)
- (3:04) INST – Keshon Singleton 57-yard pass from Brock Riddle, Sebastian Lopez kick (Drive: 4 plays, 75 yards, 1:21; South Dakota 10–7)
- (0:00) SDAK – Will Leyland 26-yard field goal (Drive: 10 plays, 57 yards, 3:04; South Dakota 13–7)

Third quarter

- (6:44) SDAK – Will Leyland 23-yard field goal (Drive: 12 plays, 71 yards, 6:42; South Dakota 16–7)

Fourth quarter

- (0:00) SDAK – Will Leyland 42-yard field goal (Drive: 9 plays, 51 yards, 6:11; South Dakota 19–7)
- (3:06) INST – Nick Osho 1-yard pass from Brock Riddle, Sebastian Lopez kick (Drive: 10 plays, 75 yards, 2:49; South Dakota 19–14)

Statistics	SDAK	INST
First downs	23	8
Total yards	376	210
Rushing yards	190	85
Passing yards	186	125
Passing: Comp–Att–Int	16–25–0	13–23–0
Time of possession	45:21	14:39

Team	Category	Player	Statistics
South Dakota	Passing	Aidan Bouman	16/25, 186 yards
South Dakota	Rushing	L. J. Phillips Jr.	34 carries, 187 yards, TD
South Dakota	Receiving	Jack Martens	5 receptions, 77 yards
Indiana State	Passing	Brock Riddle	13/23, 125 yards, 2 TD
Indiana State	Rushing	Nick Osho	12 carries, 71 yards
Indiana State	Receiving	Keshon Singleton	2 receptions, 78 yards, TD

=== No. 1 North Dakota State ===
No. 1 North Dakota State Bison (6–0) vs. Indiana State Sycamores (2–4) – Game summary

Quarter	1	2	3	4	Total
No. 1 Bison	0	10	14	14	38
Sycamores	7	0	0	0	7

at Memorial Stadium, Terre Haute, IN

- Date: October 18
- Game time: 1:00 p.m.
- Game weather: Sunny
- Game attendance: 3,252
- Referee: Grant Henderson
- TV announcers (ESPN+): Dom Izzo (play-by-play), Phil Hansen (analyst) and Noah Gindorff (sideline)

Game information
First quarter
- (4:11) INST – Nick Osho 3-yard run, Sebastian Lopez kick (Drive: 14 plays, 97 yards, 6:21; Indiana State 7–0)

Second quarter

- (13:38) NDSU – Truman Werremeyer 3-yard pass from Cole Payton, Eli Ozick kick (Drive: 12 plays, 75 yards, 5:33; Tied 7–7)
- (1:44) NDSU – Eli Ozick 54-yard field goal (Drive: 7 plays, 19 yards, 1:56; North Dakota State 10–7)

Third quarter

- (14:44) NDSU – Cole Payton 3-yard run, Eli Ozick kick (Drive: 1 play, 3 yards, 0:04; North Dakota State 17–7)
- (7:27) NDSU – Barika Kpeenu 15-yard run, Eli Ozick kick (Drive: 9 plays, 80 yards, 5:25; North Dakota State 24–7)

Fourth quarter

- (14:24) NDSU – DJ Scott 18-yard run, Eli Ozick kick (Drive: 10 plays, 88 yards, 5:43; North Dakota State 31–7)
- (8:26) NDSU – Barika Kpeenu 1-yard run, Eli Ozick kick (Drive: 8 plays, 64 yards, 4:40; North Dakota State 38–7)

Statistics	NDSU	INST
First downs	26	10
Total yards	444	192
Rushing yards	283	85
Passing yards	161	107
Passing: Comp–Att–Int	13–20–1	14–24–1
Time of possession	37:19	22:41

Team	Category	Player	Statistics
North Dakota State	Passing	Cole Payton	12/18, 149 yards, TD, INT
North Dakota State	Rushing	Barika Kpeenu	23 carries, 113 yards, 2 TD
North Dakota State	Receiving	Bryce Lance	4 receptions, 74 yards
Indiana State	Passing	Keegan Patterson	14/24, 107 yards, INT
Indiana State	Rushing	Nick Osho	16 carries, 48 yards, TD
Indiana State	Receiving	Zack Drawdy Jr.	3 receptions, 49 yards

=== at No. 8 North Dakota ===
Indiana State Sycamores (2–5) vs. No. 8 North Dakota Fighting Hawks (5–2) – Game summary

Quarter	1	2	3	4	Total
Sycamores	3	0	7	7	17
No. 8 Fighting Hawks	7	17	20	2	46

at Alerus Center, Grand Forks, ND

- Date: October 25
- Game time: 4:00 p.m.
- Game weather: Sunny • Temperature: 72 °F (22 °C)
- Game attendance: 10,618
- Referee: Gregory Gompf
- TV announcers (ESPN+): Jody Norstedt (play-by-play) and Ryan Kasowski (analyst)

Game information
First quarter
- (8:30) UND – Sawyer Seidl 22-yard run, Kenten Laughman kick (Drive: 9 plays, 85 yards, 5:39; North Dakota 7–0)
- (3:58) INST – Sebastian Lopez 46-yard field goal (Drive: 12 plays, 39 yards, 5:03; North Dakota 7–3)

Second quarter

- (8:55) UND – Nathan Hromadka 3-yard pass from Jerry Kaminski, Kenten Laughman kick (Drive: 7 plays, 31 yards, 3:14; North Dakota 14–3)
- (4:29) UND – Jerry Kaminski 4-yard run, Kenten Laughman kick (Drive: 6 plays, 50 yards, 2:18; North Dakota 21–3)
- (0:28) UND –Kenten Laughman 29-yard field goal (Drive: 11 plays, 68 yards, 1:18; North Dakota 24–3)

Third quarter

- (9:48) UND – Sawyer Seidl 5-yard pass from Jerry Kaminski, two-point run conversion failed (Drive: 3 plays, 65 yards, 1:27; North Dakota 30–3)
- (8:48) INST – Keshon Singleton 7-yard pass from Brock Riddle, Sebastian Lopez kick (Drive: 4 plays, 75 yards, 1:00; North Dakota 30–10)
- (2:41) UND – Caden Dennis 26-yard pass from Jerry Kaminski, Kenten Laughman kick (Drive: 6 plays, 63 yards, 2:33; North Dakota 37–10)
- (0:25) UND – BJ Fleming 3-yard pass from Jerry Kaminski, Easton Choate kick (Drive: 3 plays, 15 yards, 1:08; North Dakota 44–10)

Fourth quarter

- (10:58) INST – Team safety (North Dakota 46–10)
- (4:53) INST – BJ Wuest 15-yard punt return, Sebastian Lopez kick (Drive: 3 plays, 1 yards, 1:29; North Dakota 46–17)

Statistics	INST	UND
First downs	10	25
Total yards	221	564
Rushing yards	63	264
Passing yards	158	300
Passing: Comp–Att–Int	10–34–3	22–39–1
Time of possession	25:26	34:34

Team	Category	Player	Statistics
Indiana State	Passing	Brock Riddle	3/12, 88 yards, TD, 2 INT
Indiana State	Rushing	Plez Lawrence	5 carries, 37 yards
Indiana State	Receiving	Rashad Rochelle	4 receptions, 113 yards
North Dakota	Passing	Jerry Kaminski	22/34, 300 yards, 4 TD, INT
North Dakota	Rushing	Sawyer Seidl	14 carries, 104 yards, TD
North Dakota	Receiving	Caden Dennis	5 receptions, 97 yards, TD

=== at No. 4т South Dakota State ===
Indiana State Sycamores (2–6) vs. No. 4т South Dakota State Jackrabbits (7–1) – Game summary

Quarter	1	2	3	4	Total
Sycamores	7	3	7	7	24
No. 4т Jackrabbits	3	3	0	6	12

at Dana J. Dykhouse Stadium, Brookings, SD

- Date: November 1
- Game time: 3:00 p.m.
- Game weather: Cloudy • Temperature: 41 °F (5 °C) • Wind: N at 5 miles per hour (8.0 km/h)
- Game attendance: 15,842
- Referee: Jason Perkins
- TV announcers (ESPN+): Tyler Merriam (play-by-play) and Kurtiss Riggs (analyst)

Game information
First quarter
- (11:39) SDST – Eli Stader 44-yard field goal (Drive: 9 plays, 50 yards, 3:17; South Dakota State 3–0)
- (11:25) INST – Rashad Rochelle 95-yard kickoff return, Sebastian Lopez kick (Drive: 0 plays, 0 yards, 0:00; Indiana State 7–3)

Second quarter

- (14:19) INST – Sebastian Lopez 46-yard field goal (Drive: 10 plays, 43 yards, 3:39; Indiana State 10–3)
- (9:27) SDST – Eli Stader 46-yard field goal (Drive: 9 plays, 32 yards, 4:46; Indiana State 10–6)

Third quarter

- (5:03) INST – Rashad Rochelle 14-yard pass from Keegan Patterson, Sebastian Lopez kick (Drive: 9 plays, 64 yards, 4:28; Indiana State 17–6)

Fourth quarter

- (8:36) SDST – Alex Bullock 27-yard pass from Luke Marble, two-point run conversion failed (Drive: 10 plays, 81 yards, 3:58; Indiana State 17–12)
- (3:06) INST – Rashad Rochelle 57-yard pass from Keegan Patterson, Sebastian Lopez kick (Drive: 2 plays, 57 yards, 0:47; Indiana State 24–12)

Statistics	INST	SDST
First downs	9	26
Total yards	228	441
Rushing yards	40	162
Passing yards	188	279
Passing: Comp–Att–Int	15–25–0	24–42–2
Time of possession	18:48	41:12

Team	Category	Player	Statistics
Indiana State	Passing	Keegan Patterson	15/25, 188 yards, 2 TD
Indiana State	Rushing	Kaden Patterson	6 carries, 34 yards
Indiana State	Receiving	Rashad Rochelle	4 receptions, 84 yards, 2 TD
South Dakota State	Passing	Luke Marble	17/29, 181 yards, TD, INT
South Dakota State	Rushing	Josiah Johnson	14 carries, 75 yards
South Dakota State	Receiving	Alex Bullock	7 receptions, 107 yards, TD

=== No. 16 Illinois State ===
No. 16 Illinois State Redbirds (6–3) at Indiana State Sycamores (3–6) – Game summary

Quarter	1	2	3	4	Total
No. 16 Redbirds	7	28	17	0	52
Sycamores	7	7	6	0	20

at Memorial Stadium • Terre Haute, IN

- Date: November 8
- Game time: 12:00 p.m. CST
- Game weather: Sunny • Temperature: 56 °F (13 °C) • Wind: NW at 5 miles per hour (8.0 km/h)
- Game attendance: 3,202
- Referee: Carl Chapman
- TV announcers (ESPN+): Joey O'Rourke (play-by-play), Jim Leisure (analyst), Piper Watkins (sideline)
- Box score

Game information
First quarter
- (6:13) ILST – Max Ziebarth 2-yard pass from Tommy Rittenhouse, Matt Maldonado kick (Drive: 10 plays, 70 yards, 4:47; Illinois State 7–0)
- (2:01) INST – Talan White 25-yard pass from Keegan Patterson, Sebastian Lopez kick (Drive: 5 plays, 57 yards, 1:41; Tied 7–7)

Second quarter

- (13:55) ILST – Victor Dawson 6-yard run, Matt Maldonado kick (Drive: 7 plays, 65 yards, 3:06; Illinois State 14–7)
- (10:52) INST – Rashad Rochelle 64-yard pass from Keegan Patterson, Sebastian Lopez kick (Drive: 7 plays, 75 yards, 3:03; Tied 14–14)
- (6:57) ILST – Dylan Lord 3-yard pass from Tommy Rittenhouse, Matt Maldonado kick (Drive: 9 plays, 52 yards, 3:54; Illinois State 21–14)
- (1:39) ILST – Seth Glatz 20-yard pass from Tommy Rittenhouse, Matt Maldonado kick (Drive: 10 plays, 72 yards, 3:54; Illinois State 28–14)
- (0:22) ILST – Tommy Rittenhouse 4-yard run, Matt Maldonado kick (Drive: 4 plays, 48 yards, 0:31; Illinois State 35–14)

Third quarter

- (10:18) ILST – Daniel Sobkowicz 12-yard pass from Tommy Rittenhouse, Matt Maldonado kick (Drive: 7 plays, 66 yards, 2:56; Illinois State 42–14)
- (7:28) ILST – Seth Glatz 2-yard run, Matt Maldonado kick (Drive: 6 plays, 37 yards, 2:39; Illinois State 49–14)
- (5:20) INST – Deion Brown 33-yard run, Sebastian Lopez kick failed (Drive: 6 plays, 75 yards, 2:08; Illinois State 49–20)
- (1:01) ILST – Matt Maldonado 49-yard field goal (Drive: 9 plays, 48 yards, 4:14; Illinois State 52–20)

Fourth quarter

- No scoring plays

Statistics	ILST	INST
First downs	33	12
Total yards	555	272
Rushing yards	241	68
Passing yards	314	204
Passing: Comp–Att–Int	29–34–0	17–28–2
Time of possession	40:42	19:18

Team	Category	Player	Statistics
Illinois State	Passing	Tommy Rittenhouse	29/34, 314 yards, 4 TD
Illinois State	Rushing	Victor Dawson	21 carries, 116 yards, 1 TD
Illinois State	Receiving	Dylan Lord	8 receptions, 87 yards, 1 TD
Indiana State	Passing	Keegan Patterson	16/26, 202 yards, 2 TD, 2 INT
Indiana State	Rushing	Deion Brown	7 carries, 39 yards, 1 TD
Indiana State	Receiving	Rashad Rochelle	6 receptions, 103 yards, 1 TD

=== at No. 20 Youngstown State ===
Indiana State Sycamores (3–7) vs. No. 20 Youngstown State Penguins (6–4) – Game summary

Quarter	1	2	3	4	Total
Sycamores	6	20	0	3	29
No. 20 Penguins	14	17	7	10	48

at Stambaugh Stadium, Youngstown, OH

- Date: November 15
- Game time: 12:00 p.m.
- Game weather: Cloudy • Temperature: 55 °F (13 °C) • Wind: SW at 57 miles per hour (92 km/h)
- Game attendance: 7,392
- Referee: Jason Berg
- TV: ESPN+

Game information
First quarter
- (3:59) YSU – Beau Brungard 8-yard run, Andrew Lastovka kick (Drive: 1 play, 8 yards, 0:06; YSU 7–0)
- (2:10) INST – Rashad Rochelle 11-yard pass from Keegan Patterson, Sebastian Lopez kick failed (Drive: 4 plays, 75 yards, 1:49; YSU 7–6)
- (0:27) YSU – Beau Brungard 1-yard run, Andrew Lastovka kick (Drive: 10 plays, 75 yards, 4:22; YSU 14–6)

Second quarter

- (11:05) INST – Nick Osho 2-yard run, Keegan Patterson pass failed (Drive: 10 plays, 75 yards, 4:22; YSU 14–12)
- (7:32) YSU – Beau Brungard 1-yard run, Andrew Lastovka kick (Drive: 6 plays, 54 yards, 3:20; YSU 21–12)
- (6:46) INST – Rashad Rochelle 78-yard pass from Keegan Patterson, Sebastian Lopez kick (Drive: 2 plays, 79 yards, 0:37; YSU 21–19)
- (3:54) YSU – Kylon Wilson 20-yard pass from Beau Brungard, Andrew Lastovka kick (Drive: 6 plays, 75 yards, 2:52; YSU 28–19)
- (3:01) INST – Rashad Rochelle 74-yard pass from Keegan Patterson, Sebastial Lopez kick (Drive: 2 plays, 72 yards, 0:47; YSU 28–26)
- (0:14) YSU – Andrew Lastovka 39-yard field goal (Drive: 7 plays, 6 yards, 1:03; YSU 31–26)

Third quarter

- (9:08) YSU – Austin Bray 2-yard pass from Beau Brungard, Andrew Lastovka kick (Drive: 8 plays, 79 yards, 3:56; YSU 38–26)

Fourth quarter

- (12:55) YSU – Austin Bray 5-yard pass from Beau Brungard, Andrew Lastovka kick (Drive: 8 plays, 79 yards, 3:48; YSU 45–26)
- (7:13) INST – Sebastian Lopez 38-yard field goal (Drive: 13 plays, 55 yards, 5:42; YSU 45–29)
- (2:58) YSU – Andrew Lastovka 42-yard field goal (Drive: 8 plays, 27 yards, 4:14; YSU 48–29)

Statistics	INST	YSU
First downs	19	25
Total yards	492	482
Rushing yards	173	218
Passing yards	319	264
Passing: Comp–Att–Int	15–24–1	23–30–0
Time of possession	25:16	34:44

Team	Category	Player	Statistics
Indiana State	Passing	Keegan Patterson	15/24, 319 yards, 3 TD, INT
Indiana State	Rushing	Nick Osho	15 carries, 102 yards, TD
Indiana State	Receiving	Rashad Rochelle	6 receptions, 224 yards, 3 TD
Youngstown State	Passing	Beau Brungard	23/30, 264 yards, 3 TD
Youngstown State	Rushing	Jaden Gilbert	9 carries, 91 yards
Youngstown State	Receiving	Max Tomczak	7 receptions, 109 yards

=== Murray State ===
Murray State Racers (0–11) vs. Indiana State Sycamores (3–8) – Game summary

Quarter	1	2	3	4	Total
Racers	7	10	7	7	31
Sycamores	7	0	3	7	17

at Memorial Stadium, Terre Haute, IN

- Date: November 22
- Game time: 12:00 p.m.
- Game weather: Sunny
- Game attendance: 8,529
- Referee: Grant Henderson
- TV: ESPN+

Game information
First quarter
- (12:30) INST – Rashad Rochelle 66-yard pass from Keegan Patterson, Spencer Conrad kick (Drive: 1 play, 66 yards, 0:12; Indiana State 7–0)
- (10:35) MUR – Jawaun Northington 14-yard run, Jack Tannehill kick (Drive: 5 plays, 77 yards, 1:49; Tied 7–7)

Second quarter

- (4:03) MUR – Jawaun Northington 14-yard run, Jack Tannehill kick (Drive: 14 plays, 96 yards, 6:08; Murray State 14–7)
- (0:13) MUR – Jack Tannehill 26-yard field goal (Drive: 11 plays, 80 yards, 2:40; Murray State 17–7)

Third quarter

- (11:05) INST – Spencer Conrad 27-yard field goal (Drive: 11 plays, 66 yards, 3:55; Murray State 17–10)
- (9:36) MUR – Jordan Washington 6-yard run, Jack Tannehill kick (Drive: 4 plays, 57 yards, 1:22; Murray State 24–10)

Fourth quarter

- (13:36) INST – Torey French 72-yard pass from Keegan Patterson, Spencer Conrad kick (Drive: 5 plays, 85 yards, 1:34; Murray State 24–17)
- (2:58) MUR – J'Kalon Carer 6-yard pass from Baxter Wright, Jack Tannehill kick (Drive: 10 plays, 88 yards, 6:05; Murray State 31–17)

Statistics	MUR	INST
First downs	28	19
Total yards	564	481
Rushing yards	284	167
Passing yards	280	314
Passing: Comp–Att–Int	23–31–0	17–28–1
Time of possession	33:47	26:13

Team	Category	Player	Statistics
Murray State	Passing	Baxter Wright	22/30, 253 yards, TD
Murray State	Rushing	Jawaun Northington	32 carries, 232 yards, 2 TD
Murray State	Receiving	Darius Cannon	9 receptions, 110 yards
Indiana State	Passing	Keegan Patterson	17/28, 314 yards, 2 TD, INT
Indiana State	Rushing	Deion Browns	19 carries, 78 yards
Indiana State	Receiving	Rashad Rochelle	5 receptions, 120 yards, TD
