= 2025 North Dakota State Bison football team =

American college football season

2025 North Dakota State Bison football

MVFC champion

NCAA Division I Second Round, L 28–29 vs. Illinois State
- Conference: Missouri Valley Football Conference

Ranking
- STATS: No. 4 (tie)
- FCS Coaches: No. 5
- Record: 12–1 (8–0 MVFC)
- Head coach: Tim Polasek (2nd season)
- Offensive coordinator: Dan Larson (1st season)
- Offensive scheme: Multiple pro-style
- Defensive coordinator: Grant Olson (2nd season)
- Base defense: Multiple 4–3
- Home stadium: Fargodome

2025 Missouri Valley Football Conference standings
	Conf.			Overall
Team	W		L	W		L
No. 4т North Dakota State $^	8	–	0	12	–	1
No. 9 South Dakota ^	6	–	2	10	–	5
No. 2 Illinois State ^	5	–	3	12	–	5
No. 14 North Dakota ^	5	–	3	8	–	6
No. 18 Youngstown State ^	5	–	3	8	–	5
No. 13 South Dakota State ^	4	–	4	9	–	5
No. 25 Southern Illinois	4	–	4	7	–	5
Northern Iowa	1	–	7	3	–	9
Murray State	1	–	7	1	–	11
Indiana State	1	–	7	3	–	9
$ – Conference champion; ^ – FCS playoff participant; Rankings from STATS Poll

The 2025 North Dakota State Bison football team represented North Dakota State University as a member of the Missouri Valley Football Conference (MVFC) during the 2025 NCAA Division I FCS football season. The Bison were led by second-year head coach Tim Polasek and played home games at the Fargodome in Fargo, North Dakota. This would be their last season in the FCS before moving to the Mountain West Conference in the FBS.

Notably, the team received three votes in the Week 15 AP poll rankings. This was the first time since 2019 that the Bison received at least one vote from an AP voter.

The Bison finished their regular season with a 12–0 record (8–0 in conference) for the fourth time in the Division I era and the eleventh time overall. They were the top seed in the FCS playoffs and received a first round bye. However, they would fall to Illinois State in the second round, which snapped a 15 year streak of making at least the quarterfinal round and was the first time in NDSU's string of FCS strength that they failed to advance.

== Schedule ==
Date	Time	Opponent	Rank	Site	TV	Result	Attendance
August 30	11:00 am	at The Citadel*	No. 1	Johnson Hagood Stadium; Charleston, SC	ABC ND/ESPN+	W 38–0	10,691
September 6	1:30 pm	at Tennessee State*	No. 1	Nissan Stadium; Nashville, TN	ESPN+	W 59–3	8,569
September 13	2:30 pm	Southeast Missouri State*	No. 1	Fargodome; Fargo, ND	ABC ND/ESPN+	W 41–14	17,354
September 27	1:00 pm	No. 17 South Dakota^{†}	No. 1	Fargodome; Fargo, ND	ABC ND/Midco Sports/ESPN+	W 51–13	18,498
October 4	6:00 pm	at No. 6 Illinois State	No. 1	Hancock Stadium; Normal, IL	ESPN+	W 33–16	9,829
October 11	2:30 pm	No. 8 Southern Illinois	No. 1	Fargodome; Fargo, ND	ABC ND/ESPN+	W 45–17	15,812
October 18	12:00 pm	at Indiana State	No. 1	Memorial Stadium; Terre Haute, IN	ABC ND/ESPN+	W 38–7	3,252
October 25	7:00 pm	at No. 2 South Dakota State	No. 1	Dana J. Dykhouse Stadium; Brookings, SD (Dakota Marker)	ESPNU	W 38–7	19,477
November 1	2:30 pm	No. 18 Youngstown State	No. 1	Fargodome; Fargo, ND	ABC ND/ESPN+	W 38–30	14,607
November 8	1:00 pm	at No. 13 North Dakota	No. 1	Alerus Center; Grand Forks, ND (Nickel Trophy)	ABC ND/Midco Sports/ESPN+	W 15–10	12,749
November 15	2:30 pm	Northern Iowa	No. 1	Fargodome; Fargo, ND	ABC ND/ESPN+	W 48–16	14,736
November 22	2:30 pm	St. Thomas*	No. 1	Fargodome; Fargo, ND	ABC ND/ESPN+	W 62–7	15,278
December 6	12:00 pm	No. 17т Illinois State*	No. 1	Fargodome; Fargo, ND (NCAA Division I Second Round)	ESPN+	L 28–29	10,464
*Non-conference game; ^{†}Homecoming; Rankings from STATS Poll released prior to the game; All times are in Central time

== Rankings ==
=== FBS polls ===
Ranking movements Legend: ██ Increase in ranking ██ Decrease in ranking — = Not ranked RV = Received votes
	Week																
Poll	Pre	1	2	3	4	5	6	7	8	9	10	11	12	13	14	15	Final
AP	—	—	—	—	—	—	—	—	—	—	—	—	—	—	RV	—	—

=== FCS polls ===
Ranking movements Legend: ██ Increase in ranking ██ Decrease in ranking т = Tied with team above or below ( ) = First-place votes
	Week														
Poll	Pre	1	2	3	4	5	6	7	8	9	10	11	12	13	Final
STATS	1 (54)	1 (53)	1 (49)	1 (52)	1 (51)	1 (51)	1 (54)	1 (55)	1 (55)	1 (56)	1 (56)	1 (55)	1 (56)	1 (56)	4т
Coaches	1 (26)	1 (25)	1 (24)	1 (25)	1 (25)	1 (25)	1 (26)	1 (26)	1 (26)	1 (25)	1 (25)	1 (23)	1 (23)	1 (24)	5

== Preseason ==
=== MVFC poll ===
The Missouri Valley Football Conference released its preseason poll on July 21, 2025, voted on by league athletic directors, coaches, and media members. The Bison were predicted to finish first in the conference.

== Game summaries ==
=== Regular season ===
==== The Citadel ====
No. 1 North Dakota State Bison (0–0) vs. The Citadel Bulldogs (0–0)

Quarter	1	2	3	4	Total
No. 1 Bison	0	17	14	7	38
Bulldogs	0	0	0	0	0

at Johnson Hagood Stadium, Charleston, SC

- Date: August 30, 2025
- Game time: 11:00 am
- Game weather: Rain; 72 °F (22 °C); Wind: NE 15 mph
- Game attendance: 10,691
- Referee: Jake Grombach
- TV: ESPN+
- Box score, Recap

Statistics	North Dakota State	The Citadel
First downs	25	8
Plays–yards	69–519	47–126
Rushes–yards	47–256	41–104
Passing yards	263	22
Passing: comp–att–int	16–22–0	2–6–0
Turnovers	0	1
Time of possession	36:03	23:57

Team	Category	Player	Statistics
North Dakota State	Passing	Cole Payton	11/17, 192 yds, TD
North Dakota State	Rushing	Cole Payton	11 car, 101 yds
North Dakota State	Receiving	RaJa Nelson	2 rec, 60 yds, TD
The Citadel	Passing	Quentin Hayes	1/3, 14 yds
The Citadel	Rushing	Israel Benjamin	16 car, 54 yds
The Citadel	Receiving	Javonte Graves-Billips	1 rec, 14 yds

Scoring summary

Quarter	Time	Drive			Team	Scoring information	Score	
Quarter	Time	Plays	Yards	TOP	Team	Scoring information	NDSU	CIT
2nd	13:36	9	72	3:55	NDSU	31-yard field goal by Eli Ozick (#38)	3	0
2nd	5:10	12	90	6:22	NDSU	Barika Kpeenu (#8) 2-yard touchdown run, Eli Ozick (#38) kick good	10	0
2nd	1:36	7	84	1:57	NDSU	RaJa Nelson (#3) 34-yard touchdown reception from Cole Payton (#9), Eli Ozick (#38) kick good	17	0
3rd	14:13	2	1	0:34	NDSU	Barika Kpeenu (#8) 1-yard touchdown run, Eli Ozick (#38) kick good	24	0
3rd	4:54	12	82	7:14	NDSU	DJ Scott (#7) 1-yard touchdown run, Eli Ozick (#38) kick good	31	0
4th	5:07	12	95	7:20	NDSU	Isiah St. Romain (#17) 15-yard touchdown reception from Nathan Hayes (#12), Eli Ozick (#38) kick good	38	0
"TOP" = time of possession. For other American football terms, see Glossary of American football.							38	0

==== Tennessee State ====
No. 1 North Dakota State Bison (1–0) vs. Tennessee State Tigers (1–0)

Quarter	1	2	3	4	Total
No. 1 Bison	17	28	7	7	59
Tigers	0	0	0	3	3

at Nissan Stadium, Nashville, TN

- Date: September 6, 2025
- Game time: 1:30 pm
- Game weather: Cloudy; 67 °F (19 °C); Wind: N 2 mph
- Game attendance: 8,569
- Referee: Chris Brison
- TV: ESPN+
- Box score, Recap

Statistics	North Dakota State	Tennessee State
First downs	24	4
Plays–yards	62–433	46–131
Rushes–yards	39–191	28–70
Passing yards	242	61
Passing: comp–att–int	16–23–1	8–18–1
Turnovers	1	2
Time of possession	33:37	26:23

Team	Category	Player	Statistics
North Dakota State	Passing	Cole Payton	13/16, 166 yds, TD
North Dakota State	Rushing	Barika Kpeenu	10 car, 57 yds, 3 TD
North Dakota State	Receiving	Mekhi Collins	1 rec, 68 yds, TD
Tennessee State	Passing	Jonathan Palmer	5/13, 38 yds
Tennessee State	Rushing	Kendric Rhymes	12 car, 43 yds
Tennessee State	Receiving	Tyson Edwards	1 rec, 16 yds

Scoring summary

Quarter	Time	Drive			Team	Scoring information	Score	
Quarter	Time	Plays	Yards	TOP	Team	Scoring information	NDSU	TNST
1st	9:31	9	71	5:24	NDSU	Barika Kpeenu (#8) 10-yard touchdown run, Eli Ozick (#38) kick good	7	0
1st	7:08	4	20	1:55	NDSU	Barika Kpeenu (#8) 4-yard touchdown run, Eli Ozick (#38) kick good	14	0
1st	1:21	9	38	3:39	NDSU	22-yard field goal by Eli Ozick (#38)	17	0
2nd	13:08	5	33	2:04	NDSU	Barika Kpeenu (#8) 6-yard touchdown run, Eli Ozick (#38) kick good	24	0
2nd	10:04	2	46	0:50	NDSU	DJ Scott (#7) 5-yard touchdown run, Eli Ozick (#38) kick good	31	0
2nd	9:03				NDSU	Interception returned 34 yards for touchdown by Donovan Woolen (#1), Eli Ozick (#38) kick good	38	0
2nd	1:21	8	67	5:32	NDSU	RaJa Nelson (#3) 3-yard touchdown reception from Cole Payton (#9), Eli Ozick (#38) kick good	45	0
3rd	7:11	5	82	2:56	NDSU	Mekhi Collins (#15) 68-yard touchdown reception from Nathan Hayes (#12), Eli Ozick (#38) kick good	52	0
4th	8:27	5	49	2:45	NDSU	Myles Mitchell (#45) 2-yard touchdown run, Drew Klein (#37) kick good	59	0
4th	4:05	7	48	4:22	TNST	45-yard field goal by Freddy Perez (#4)	59	3
"TOP" = time of possession. For other American football terms, see Glossary of American football.							59	3

==== Southeast Missouri State ====
Southeast Missouri State Redhawks (1–1) vs. No. 1 North Dakota State Bison (2–0)

Quarter	1	2	3	4	Total
Redhawks	7	7	0	0	14
No. 1 Bison	14	17	3	7	41

at Fargodome, Fargo, ND

- Date: September 13, 2025
- Game time: 2:30 pm
- Game weather: Indoors; 70 °F (21 °C)
- Game attendance: 17,354
- Referee: Tyler Downs
- TV: ESPN+
- Box score, Recap

Statistics	Southeast Missouri State	North Dakota State
First downs	12	22
Plays–yards	57–217	61–562
Rushes–yards	32–64	37–214
Passing yards	153	348
Passing: comp–att–int	13–25–1	16–24–0
Turnovers	1	0
Time of possession	29:12	30:48

Team	Category	Player	Statistics
Southeast Missouri State	Passing	Jax Leatherwood	12/23, 145 yds, TD
Southeast Missouri State	Rushing	Jax Leatherwood	10 car, 20 yds
Southeast Missouri State	Receiving	Kalvin Gilbert	2 rec, 67 yds, TD
North Dakota State	Passing	Cole Payton	16/23, 348 yds, 4 TD
North Dakota State	Rushing	Barika Kpeenu	14 car, 84 yds
North Dakota State	Receiving	Bryce Lance	4 rec, 159 yds, TD

Scoring summary

Quarter	Time	Drive			Team	Scoring information	Score	
Quarter	Time	Plays	Yards	TOP	Team	Scoring information	SEMO	NDSU
1st	12:15	5	75	2:45	NDSU	RaJa Nelson (#3) 15-yard touchdown reception from Cole Payton (#9), Eli Ozick (#38) kick good	0	7
1st	10:37	5	75	1:38	SEMO	Kalvin Gilbert (#21) 65-yard touchdown reception from Jax Leatherwood (#12), Justin Keller (#39) kick good	7	7
1st	7:06	2	79	0:46	NDSU	Bryce Lance (#5) 75-yard touchdown reception from Cole Payton (#9), Eli Ozick (#38) kick good	7	14
2nd	14:23	5	41	2:40	NDSU	43-yard field goal by Eli Ozick (#38)	7	17
2nd	10:37	4	86	2:09	NDSU	Mekhi Collins (#15) 28-yard touchdown reception from Cole Payton (#9), Eli Ozick (#38) kick good	7	24
2nd	4:38	13	81	5:55	SEMO	Payton Brown (#22) 1-yard touchdown run, Justin Keller (#39) kick good	14	24
2nd	0:25	11	75	4:13	NDSU	RaJa Nelson (#3) 5-yard touchdown reception from Cole Payton (#9), Eli Ozick (#38) kick good	14	31
3rd	11:19	6	41	2:08	NDSU	43-yard field goal by Eli Ozick (#38)	14	34
4th	12:08	7	93	3:39	NDSU	Cole Payton (#9) 1-yard touchdown run, Eli Ozick (#38) kick good	14	41
"TOP" = time of possession. For other American football terms, see Glossary of American football.							14	41

==== South Dakota ====
No. 17 South Dakota Coyotes (2–2) vs. No. 1 North Dakota State Bison (3–0)

Quarter	1	2	3	4	Total
No. 17 Coyotes	0	3	0	10	13
No. 1 Bison	13	21	10	7	51

at Fargodome, Fargo, ND

- Date: September 27, 2025
- Game time: 1:00 pm
- Game weather: Indoors; 70 °F (21 °C)
- Game attendance: 18,498
- Referee: Grant Henderson
- TV: ESPN+
- Box score, Recap

Statistics	South Dakota	North Dakota State
First downs	13	24
Plays–yards	48–296	69–547
Rushes–yards	27–88	50–274
Passing yards	208	273
Passing: comp–att–int	13–21–1	15–19–0
Turnovers	1	0
Time of possession	24:53	35:07

Team	Category	Player	Statistics
South Dakota	Passing	Aidan Bouman	13/21, 208 yds, INT
South Dakota	Rushing	Reid Watkins	8 car, 39 yds
South Dakota	Receiving	Tennel Bryant	2 rec, 50 yds
North Dakota State	Passing	Cole Payton	14/18, 273 yds, 2 TD
North Dakota State	Rushing	Cole Payton	11 car, 102 yds, TD
North Dakota State	Receiving	Bryce Lance	4 rec, 98 yds, TD

Scoring summary

Quarter	Time	Drive			Team	Scoring information	Score	
Quarter	Time	Plays	Yards	TOP	Team	Scoring information	USD	NDSU
1st	10:49	8	77	4:06	NDSU	Barika Kpeenu (#8) 7-yard touchdown run, Eli Ozick (#38) kick good	0	7
1st	2:17	12	90	6:16	NDSU	Cole Payton (#9) 1-yard touchdown run, Eli Ozick (#38) kick no good	0	13
2nd	13:44	6	46	2:44	NDSU	Barika Kpeenu (#8) 6-yard touchdown run, Eli Ozick (#38) kick good	0	20
2nd	5:38	11	95	5:49	NDSU	Bryce Lance (#5) 2-yard touchdown reception from Cole Payton (#9), Eli Ozick (#38) kick good	0	27
2nd	0:53	9	83	1:54	NDSU	Reis Kessel (#81) 29-yard touchdown reception from Cole Payton (#9), Eli Ozick (#38) kick good	0	34
2nd	0:00	6	62	0:53	USD	31-yard field goal by Will Leyland (#15)	3	34
3rd	12:43				NDSU	Interception returned 43 yards for touchdown by Nathaniel Staehling (#52), Eli Ozick (#38) kick good	3	41
3rd	7:39	8	49	3:58	NDSU	29-yard field goal by Eli Ozick (#38)	3	44
4th	12:23	11	88	6:32	NDSU	Jackson Williams (#18) 9-yard touchdown run, Eli Ozick (#38) kick good	3	51
4th	8:06	8	42	4:17	USD	51-yard field goal by Zeke Mata (#39)	6	51
4th	1:11	8	80	4:23	USD	Carson Fletcher (#33) 4-yard touchdown run, Will Leyland (#15) kick good	13	51
"TOP" = time of possession. For other American football terms, see Glossary of American football.							13	51

==== Illinois State ====
No. 1 North Dakota State Bison (4–0) vs. No. 6 Illinois State Redbirds (3–1)

Quarter	1	2	3	4	Total
No. 1 Bison	7	8	3	15	33
No. 6 Redbirds	2	7	7	0	16

at Hancock Stadium, Normal, IL

- Date: October 4, 2025
- Game time: 6:00 pm
- Game weather: Sunny; 82 °F (28 °C); Wind: N 10 mph
- Game attendance: 9,829
- Referee: Jason Berg
- TV announcers (ESPN+): Greg Halbleib (play-by-play) and Clay Harbor (analyst)
- Box score, Recap

Statistics	North Dakota State	Illinois State
First downs	21	22
Plays–yards	50–407	66–328
Rushes–yards	36–213	31–137
Passing yards	194	191
Passing: comp–att–int	12–14–0	20–35–1
Turnovers	0	2
Time of possession	29:38	30:22

Team	Category	Player	Statistics
North Dakota State	Passing	Cole Payton	12/14, 194 yds, TD
North Dakota State	Rushing	Barika Kpeenu	14 car, 116 yds, TD
North Dakota State	Receiving	Jackson Williams	3 rec, 71 yds
Illinois State	Passing	Tommy Rittenhouse	20/35, 191 yds, TD, INT
Illinois State	Rushing	Victor Dawson	11 car, 68 yds
Illinois State	Receiving	Daniel Sobkowicz	7 rec, 75 yds, TD

Scoring summary

Quarter	Time	Drive			Team	Scoring information	Score	
Quarter	Time	Plays	Yards	TOP	Team	Scoring information	NDSU	ILST
1st	9:35				ILST	Barika Kpeenu (#8) tackled in end zone for a safety by Tye Niekamp (#46)	0	2
1st	2:50	7	47	3:53	NDSU	Cole Payton (#9) 13-yard touchdown run, Eli Ozick (#38) kick good	7	2
2nd	11:37	10	65	6:13	ILST	Wenkers Wright (#32) 6-yard touchdown run, Matt Maldonado (#31) kick good	7	9
2nd	4:56	3	68	1:25	NDSU	Barika Kpeenu (#8) 42-yard touchdown run, 2-point run by Cole Payton (#9) good	15	9
3rd	8:15	11	65	6:38	NDSU	38-yard field goal by Eli Ozick (#38)	18	9
3rd	3:06	9	75	5:09	ILST	Daniel Sobkowicz (#2) 3-yard touchdown reception from Tommy Rittenhouse (#16), Matt Maldonado (#31) kick good	18	16
4th	13:14	8	70	4:45	NDSU	Bryce Lance (#5) 23-yard touchdown reception from Cole Payton (#9), Eli Ozick (#38) kick good	25	16
4th	8:21	6	73	3:51	NDSU	DJ Scott (#7) 5-yard touchdown run, 2-point run by Cole Payton (#9) good	33	16
"TOP" = time of possession. For other American football terms, see Glossary of American football.							33	16

==== Southern Illinois ====
No. 8 Southern Illinois Salukis (4–1) vs. No. 1 North Dakota State Bison (5–0)

Quarter	1	2	3	4	Total
No. 8 Salukis	3	7	0	7	17
No. 1 Bison	7	10	14	14	45

at Fargodome, Fargo, ND

- Date: October 11, 2025
- Game time: 2:30 pm
- Game weather: Indoors; 70 °F (21 °C)
- Game attendance: 15,812
- Referee: Carl Chapman
- TV: ESPN+
- Box score, Recap

Statistics	Southern Illinois	North Dakota State
First downs	22	24
Plays–yards	61–313	62–540
Rushes–yards	32–123	43–264
Passing yards	190	276
Passing: comp–att–int	15–29–1	16–19–0
Turnovers	3	0
Time of possession	27:14	32:46

Team	Category	Player	Statistics
Southern Illinois	Passing	DJ Williams	15/29, 190 yds, INT
Southern Illinois	Rushing	DJ Williams	15 car, 41 yds, TD
Southern Illinois	Receiving	Fabian McCray	4 rec, 52 yds
North Dakota State	Passing	Cole Payton	13/16, 243 yds, TD
North Dakota State	Rushing	Bryce Lance	1 car, 75 yds, TD
North Dakota State	Receiving	Bryce Lance	4 rec, 79 yds, TD

Scoring summary

Quarter	Time	Drive			Team	Scoring information	Score	
Quarter	Time	Plays	Yards	TOP	Team	Scoring information	SIU	NDSU
1st	7:15	13	58	7:45	SIU	35-yard field goal by Paul Geelen (#19)	3	0
1st	7:02	1	75	0:13	NDSU	Bryce Lance (#5) 75-yard touchdown run, Eli Ozick (#38) kick good	3	7
2nd	14:56	6	65	3:15	SIU	Chandler Chapman (#8) 5-yard touchdown run, Paul Geelen (#19) kick good	10	7
2nd	6:12	6	42	2:35	NDSU	38-yard field goal by Eli Ozick (#38)	10	10
2nd	0:29	5	71	0:44	NDSU	Bryce Lance (#5) 9-yard touchdown reception from Cole Payton (#5), Eli Ozick (#38) kick good	10	17
3rd	10:57	75	75	4:03	NDSU	Cole Payton (#9) 2-yard touchdown run, Eli Ozick (#38) kick good	10	24
3rd	4:51	9	74	5:29	NDSU	Cole Payton (#9) 41-yard touchdown run, Eli Ozick (#38) kick good	10	31
4th	11:23	9	75	5:32	NDSU	Barika Kpeenu (#8) 6-yard touchdown run, Eli Ozick (#38) kick good	10	38
4th	8:57	4	32	1:54	NDSU	DJ Scott (#7) 24-yard touchdown run, Eli Ozick (#38) kick good	10	45
4th	6:58	6	75	1:59	SIU	DJ Williams (#1) 3-yard touchdown run, Paul Geelen (#19) kick good	17	45
"TOP" = time of possession. For other American football terms, see Glossary of American football.							17	45

==== Indiana State ====
No. 1 North Dakota State Bison (6–0) vs. Indiana State Sycamores (2–4)

Quarter	1	2	3	4	Total
No. 1 Bison	0	10	14	14	38
Sycamores	7	0	0	0	7

at Memorial Stadium, Terre Haute, IN

- Date: October 18, 2025
- Game time: 12:00 pm
- Game weather: Sunny; 55 °F (13 °C)
- Game attendance: 3,252
- Referee: Grant Henderson
- TV: ESPN+
- Box score, Recap

Statistics	North Dakota State	Indiana State
First downs	26	10
Plays–yards	72–444	53–192
Rushes–yards	52–283	29–85
Passing yards	161	107
Passing: comp–att–int	13–20–1	14–24–1
Turnovers	1	1
Time of possession	37:19	22:41

Team	Category	Player	Statistics
North Dakota State	Passing	Cole Payton	12/18, 149 yds, TD, INT
North Dakota State	Rushing	Barika Kpeenu	23 car, 113 yds, 2 TD
North Dakota State	Receiving	Bryce Lance	4 rec, 74 yds
Indiana State	Passing	Keegan Patterson	14/24, 107 yds, INT
Indiana State	Rushing	Nick Osho	16 car, 48 yds, TD
Indiana State	Receiving	Zack Drawdy Jr.	3 rec, 49 yds

Scoring summary

Quarter	Time	Drive			Team	Scoring information	Score	
Quarter	Time	Plays	Yards	TOP	Team	Scoring information	NDSU	INST
1st	4:11	14	97	6:21	INST	Nick Osho (#9) 3-yard touchdown run, Sebastian Lopez (#37) kick good	0	7
2nd	13:38	12	75	5:33	NDSU	Truman Werremeyer (#46) 3-yard touchdown reception from Cole Payton (#9), Eli Ozick (#38) kick good	7	7
2nd	1:44	7	19	1:56	NDSU	54-yard field goal by Eli Ozick (#38)	10	7
3rd	14:44	1	3	0:04	NDSU	Cole Payton (#9) 3-yard touchdown run, Eli Ozick (#38) kick good	17	7
3rd	7:27	9	80	5:25	NDSU	Barika Kpeenu (#8) 15-yard touchdown run, Eli Ozick (#38) kick good	24	7
4th	14:24	10	88	5:43	NDSU	DJ Scott (#7) 18-yard touchdown run, Eli Ozick (#38) kick good	31	7
4th	8:26	8	64	4:40	NDSU	Barika Kpeenu (#8) 1-yard touchdown run, Eli Ozick (#38) kick good	38	7
"TOP" = time of possession. For other American football terms, see Glossary of American football.							38	7

==== South Dakota State ====
No. 1 North Dakota State Bison (7–0) vs. No. 2 South Dakota State Jackrabbits (7–0)

Quarter	1	2	3	4	Total
No. 1 Bison	14	17	0	7	38
No. 2 Jackrabbits	0	7	0	0	7

at Dana J. Dykhouse Stadium, Brookings, SD

- Date: October 25, 2025
- Game time: 7:00 pm
- Game weather: Cloudy; 57 °F (14 °C); Wind: SE 14 mph
- Game attendance: 19,477
- Referee: David Hergert
- TV announcers (ESPNU): Richard Cross (play-by-play), Taylor McHargue (commentator), Tori Petry (sideline)
- Announcers, Box score, Recap

Statistics	North Dakota State	South Dakota State
First downs	24	11
Plays–yards	73–500	47–166
Rushes–yards	49–257	28–43
Passing yards	243	123
Passing: comp–att–int	18–24–1	9–19–0
Turnovers	1	0
Time of possession	38:01	21:59

Team	Category	Player	Statistics
North Dakota State	Passing	Cole Payton	18/23, 243 yds, INT
North Dakota State	Rushing	Cole Payton	17 car, 137 yds, 4 TD
North Dakota State	Receiving	Bryce Lance	5 rec, 103 yds
South Dakota State	Passing	Luke Marble	7/16, 89 yds, TD
South Dakota State	Rushing	Julius Loughridge	10 car, 38 yds
South Dakota State	Receiving	Lofton O'Groske	2 rec, 43 yds, TD

Scoring summary

Quarter	Time	Drive			Team	Scoring information	Score	
Quarter	Time	Plays	Yards	TOP	Team	Scoring information	NDSU	SDSU
1st	5:11	16	84	9:00	NDSU	Cole Payton (#9) 1-yard touchdown run, Eli Ozick (#38) kick good	7	0
1st	0:16	5	63	3:00	NDSU	Cole Payton (#9) 2-yard touchdown run, Eli Ozick (#38) kick good	14	0
2nd	10:55	7	68	3:48	NDSU	Barika Kpeenu (#8) 2-yard touchdown run, Eli Ozick (#38) kick good	21	0
2nd	5:54	2	43	0:28	SDSU	Lofton O'Groske (#1) 17-yard touchdown reception from Luke Marble (#13), Eli Stader (#26) kick good	21	7
2nd	2:38	5	70	3:10	NDSU	Cole Payton (#9) 57-yard touchdown run, Eli Ozick (#38) kick good	28	7
2nd	0:02	10	49	0:58	NDSU	43-yard field goal by Eli Ozick (#38)	31	7
4th	11:55	1	47	0:09	NDSU	Cole Payton (#9) 47-yard touchdown run, Eli Ozick (#38) kick good	38	7
"TOP" = time of possession. For other American football terms, see Glossary of American football.							38	7

==== Youngstown State ====
No. 18 Youngstown State Penguins (5–3) vs. No. 1 North Dakota State Bison (8–0)

Quarter	1	2	3	4	Total
No. 18 Penguins	3	17	3	7	30
No. 1 Bison	7	21	7	3	38

at Fargodome, Fargo, ND

- Date: November 1, 2025
- Game time: 2:30 pm
- Game weather: Indoors; 70 °F (21 °C)
- Game attendance: 14,607
- Referee: John Shay
- TV: ESPN+
- Box score, Recap

Statistics	Youngstown State	North Dakota State
First downs	21	18
Plays–yards	59–371	64–327
Rushes–yards	29–168	40–133
Passing yards	203	194
Passing: comp–att–int	19–30–1	17–24–1
Turnovers	3	1
Time of possession	26:45	33:15

Team	Category	Player	Statistics
Youngstown State	Passing	Beau Brungard	19/30, 203 yds, TD, INT
Youngstown State	Rushing	Jaden Gilbert	6 car, 63 yds
Youngstown State	Receiving	Max Tomczak	5 rec, 59 yds
North Dakota State	Passing	Cole Payton	17/24, 194 yds, INT
North Dakota State	Rushing	Barika Kpeenu	15 car, 74 yds, 3 TD
North Dakota State	Receiving	Bryce Lance	5 rec, 65 yds

Scoring summary

Quarter	Time	Drive			Team	Scoring information	Score	
Quarter	Time	Plays	Yards	TOP	Team	Scoring information	YSU	NDSU
1st	6:22	11	43	7:16	YSU	47-yard field goal by Andrew Lastovka (#24)	3	0
1st	0:41	11	56	5:34	NDSU	Barika Kpeenu (#8) 1-yard touchdown run, Eli Ozick (#38) kick good	3	7
2nd	10:43	9	68	4:51	YSU	Beau Brungard (#12) 10-yard touchdown run, Andrew Lastovka (#24) kick good	10	7
2nd	4:52	4	19	1:07	NDSU	DJ Scott (#7) 3-yard touchdown run, Eli Ozick (#38) kick good	10	14
2nd	4:17	2	9	0:30	NDSU	Barika Kpeenu (#8) 4-yard touchdown run, Eli Ozick (#38) kick good	10	21
2nd	1:49	6	46	2:19	YSU	Alex McDonald (#17) 16-yard touchdown reception from Beau Brungard (#12), Andrew Lastovka (#24) kick good	17	21
2nd	1:32				NDSU	Kickoff returned 100 yards for touchdown by Jackson Williams (#18), Eli Ozick (#38) kick good	17	28
2nd	0:08	7	44	1:24	YSU	49-yard field goal by Andrew Lastovka (#24)	20	28
3rd	12:51	7	51	2:09	YSU	42-yard field goal by Andrew Lastovka (#24)	23	28
3rd	6:22	12	84	6:23	NDSU	Barika Kpeenu (#8) 1-yard touchdown run, Eli Ozick (#38) kick good	23	35
4th	13:54	7	65	2:53	YSU	Beau Brungard (#12) 2-yard touchdown run, Andrew Lastovka (#24) kick good	30	35
4th	6:20	12	73	7:25	NDSU	21-yard field goal by Eli Ozick (#38)	30	38
"TOP" = time of possession. For other American football terms, see Glossary of American football.							30	38

==== North Dakota ====
No. 1 North Dakota State Bison (9–0) vs. No. 13 North Dakota Fighting Hawks (6–3)

Quarter	1	2	3	4	Total
No. 1 Bison	0	6	3	6	15
No. 13 Fighting Hawks	7	0	3	0	10

at Alerus Center, Grand Forks, ND

- Date: November 8, 2025
- Game time: 1:00 pm
- Game weather: Indoors; 70 °F (21 °C)
- Game attendance: 12,749
- Referee: Jason Perkins
- TV: ESPN+
- Box score, Recap

Statistics	North Dakota State	North Dakota
First downs	10	23
Plays–yards	51–268	81–286
Rushes–yards	36–143	43–116
Passing yards	125	170
Passing: comp–att–int	8–15–1	21–38–3
Turnovers	1	3
Time of possession	25:18	34:42

Team	Category	Player	Statistics
North Dakota State	Passing	Cole Payton	8/15, 125 yds, INT
North Dakota State	Rushing	Barika Kpeenu	18 car, 73 yds
North Dakota State	Receiving	Bryce Lance	3 rec, 61 yds
North Dakota	Passing	Jerry Kaminski	21/38, 170 yds, 3 INT
North Dakota	Rushing	Sawyer Seidl	23 car, 68 yds, TD
North Dakota	Receiving	BJ Fleming	6 rec, 53 yds

Scoring summary

Quarter	Time	Drive			Team	Scoring information	Score	
Quarter	Time	Plays	Yards	TOP	Team	Scoring information	NDSU	UND
1st	2:52	2	11	0:27	UND	Sawyer Seidl (#9) 2-yard touchdown run, Kenten Laughman (#27) kick good	0	7
2nd	12:46	13	72	5:01	NDSU	24-yard field goal by Eli Ozick (#38)	3	7
2nd	2:28	7	60	4:05	NDSU	38-yard field goal by Eli Ozick (#38)	6	7
3rd	7:13	14	60	7:47	UND	32-yard field goal by Kenten Laughman (#27)	6	10
3rd	1:09	4	6	1:30	NDSU	33-yard field goal by Eli Ozick (#38)	9	10
4th	2:22	4	49	2:02	NDSU	Cole Payton (#9) 8-yard touchdown run, 2-point run by Cole Payton (#9) failed	15	10
"TOP" = time of possession. For other American football terms, see Glossary of American football.							15	10

==== Northern Iowa ====
Northern Iowa Panthers (3–7) vs. No. 1 North Dakota State Bison (10–0)

Quarter	1	2	3	4	Total
Panthers	0	2	7	7	16
No. 1 Bison	14	17	7	10	48

at Fargodome, Fargo, ND

- Date: November 15, 2025
- Game time: 2:30 pm
- Game weather: Indoors; 70 °F (21 °C)
- Game attendance: 14,736
- Referee: Gregory Gompf
- TV: ESPN+
- Box score, Recap

Statistics	Northern Iowa	North Dakota State
First downs	13	24
Plays–yards	58–201	64–477
Rushes–yards	35–102	39–209
Passing yards	99	268
Passing: comp–att–int	9–23–2	18–25–0
Turnovers	2	1
Time of possession	29:47	30:13

Team	Category	Player	Statistics
Northern Iowa	Passing	Jaxon Dailey	9/23, 99 yds, TD, 2 INT
Northern Iowa	Rushing	Harrison Bey-Buie	9 car, 62 yds
Northern Iowa	Receiving	JC Roque Jr.	3 rec, 42 yds, TD
North Dakota State	Passing	Cole Payton	15/17, 212 yds, TD
North Dakota State	Rushing	Cole Payton	10 car, 74 yds, 2 TD
North Dakota State	Receiving	Bryce Lance	8 rec, 131 yds, TD

Scoring summary

Quarter	Time	Drive			Team	Scoring information	Score	
Quarter	Time	Plays	Yards	TOP	Team	Scoring information	UNI	NDSU
1st	9:17	10	83	5:34	NDSU	Barika Kpeenu (#8) 1-yard touchdown run, Eli Ozick (#38) kick good	0	7
1st	3:06	1	5	0:05	NDSU	Cole Payton (#9) 5-yard touchdown run, Eli Ozick (#38) kick good	0	14
2nd	14:54				UNI	Cole Payton (#9) tackled in end zone for a safety by Caleb Frazer (#17)	2	14
2nd	5:57	8	87	4:32	NDSU	Bryce Lance (#5) 14-yard touchdown reception from Cole Payton (#9), Eli Ozick (#38) kick good	2	21
2nd	0:59	9	41	3:17	NDSU	Barika Kpeenu (#8) 5-yard touchdown run, Eli Ozick (#38) kick good	2	28
2nd	0:03	5	30	0:33	NDSU	46-yard field goal by Eli Ozick (#38)	2	31
3rd	13:12	1	64	0:11	NDSU	Cole Payton (#9) 64-yard touchdown run, Eli Ozick (#38) kick good	2	38
3rd	7:21				UNI	Punt blocked by Ethan Schoville (#31) returned for touchdown, Max Bartacheck (#0) kick good	9	38
4th	9:59	11	65	5:24	UNI	JC Roque Jr. (#0) 14-yard touchdown reception from Jaxon Dailey (#15), Max Bartacheck (#0) kick good	16	38
4th	6:20	9	50	3:33	NDSU	23-yard field goal by Eli Ozick (#38)	16	41
4th	1:25	9	70	3:17	NDSU	Nathan Hayes (#12) 34-yard touchdown run, Eli Ozick (#38) kick good	16	48
"TOP" = time of possession. For other American football terms, see Glossary of American football.							16	48

==== St. Thomas ====
St. Thomas Tommies (7–4) vs. No. 1 North Dakota State Bison (11–0)

Quarter	1	2	3	4	Total
Tommies	0	0	0	7	7
No. 1 Bison	28	17	14	3	62

at Fargodome, Fargo, ND

- Date: November 22, 2025
- Game time: 2:30 pm
- Game weather: Indoors; 70 °F (21 °C)
- Game attendance: 15,278
- Referee: Tyler Downs
- TV: ESPN+
- Box score, Recap

Statistics	St. Thomas	North Dakota State
First downs	12	23
Plays–yards	65–229	61–665
Rushes–yards	32–77	38–268
Passing yards	152	397
Passing: comp–att–int	17–33–2	17–23–0
Turnovers	4	2
Time of possession	31:06	28:54

Team	Category	Player	Statistics
St. Thomas	Passing	Amari Powell	14/26, 110 yds, 2 INT
St. Thomas	Rushing	Amari Powell	9 car, 66 yds, TD
St. Thomas	Receiving	JaShawn Todd	8 rec, 70 yds
North Dakota State	Passing	Cole Payton	9/12, 279 yds, 3 TD
North Dakota State	Rushing	Barika Kpeenu	10 car, 107 yds, 2 TD
North Dakota State	Receiving	Bryce Lance	3 rec, 106 yds, 2 TD

Scoring summary

Quarter	Time	Drive			Team	Scoring information	Score	
Quarter	Time	Plays	Yards	TOP	Team	Scoring information	UST	NDSU
1st	12:32	2	82	0:48	NDSU	Barika Kpeenu (#8) 74-yard touchdown run, Eli Ozick (#38) kick good	0	7
1st	9:35	4	62	2:08	NDSU	Barika Kpeenu (#8) 4-yard touchdown run, Eli Ozick (#38) kick good	0	14
1st	5:58	3	82	0:47	NDSU	Bryce Lance (#5) 81-yard touchdown reception from Cole Payton (#9), Eli Ozick (#38) kick good	0	21
1st	2:51	3	64	1:28	NDSU	Barika Kpeenu (#8) 47-yard touchdown reception from Cole Payton (#9), Eli Ozick (#38) kick good	0	28
2nd	14:07	6	80	2:40	NDSU	Jackson Williams (#18) 43-yard touchdown reception from Cole Payton (#9), Eli Ozick (#38) kick good	0	35
2nd	7:14	10	42	5:17	NDSU	38-yard field goal by Eli Ozick (#38)	0	38
2nd	0:12	7	67	1:02	NDSU	Bryce Lance (#5) 9-yard touchdown reception from Nathan Hayes (#12), Eli Ozick (#38) kick good	0	45
3rd	11:42				NDSU	Punt returned 64 yards for touchdown by Mikhale Ford (#31), Drew Klein (#37) kick good	0	52
3rd	2:34	9	91	5:15	NDSU	Cade Osterman (#83) 24-yard touchdown reception from Nathan Hayes (#12), Drew Klein (#37) kick good	0	59
4th	13:33	4	3	1:55	NDSU	46-yard field goal by Drew Klein (#37)	0	62
4th	8:11	2	8	0:49	UST	Amari Powell (#7) 7-yard touchdown run, Ben Hoiland (#39) kick good	7	62
"TOP" = time of possession. For other American football terms, see Glossary of American football.							7	62

=== NCAA Division I playoffs ===
==== Illinois State (second round) ====
No. 17т Illinois State Redbirds (9–4) vs. No. 1 North Dakota State Bison (12–0)

Quarter	1	2	3	4	Total
No. 17т Redbirds	0	14	0	15	29
No. 1 Bison	14	7	0	7	28

at Fargodome, Fargo, ND

- Date: December 6, 2025
- Game time: 12:00 pm
- Game weather: Indoors; 70 °F (21 °C)
- Game attendance: 10,464
- Referee: Gregg Wilson
- TV announcers (ESPN+): Shawn Kenney (play-by-play), Charles Arbuckle (commentator)
- Announcers, Box score, Recap

Statistics	Illinois State	North Dakota State
First downs	23	6
Plays–yards	91–422	46–179
Rushes–yards	39–173	27–59
Passing yards	249	120
Passing: comp–att–int	35–52–5	6–19–0
Turnovers	5	2
Time of possession	42:01	17:59

Team	Category	Player	Statistics
Illinois State	Passing	Tommy Rittenhouse	35/52, 249 yds, 3 TD, 5 INT
Illinois State	Rushing	Victor Dawson	23 car, 137, TD
Illinois State	Receiving	Daniel Sobkowicz	8 rec, 67 yds, 3 TD
North Dakota State	Passing	Cole Payton	4/12, 101 yds, TD
North Dakota State	Rushing	Barika Kpeenu	16 car, 55 yds, TD
North Dakota State	Receiving	Bryce Lance	1 rec, 78 yds, TD

Scoring summary

Quarter	Time	Drive			Team	Scoring information	Score	
Quarter	Time	Plays	Yards	TOP	Team	Scoring information	ILST	NDSU
1st	12:39	1	78	0:11	NDSU	Bryce Lance (#5) 78-yard touchdown reception from Cole Payton (#9), Eli Ozick (#38) kick good	0	7
1st	4:40				NDSU	Punt returned 52 yards for touchdown by Jackson Williams (#18), Eli Ozick (#38) kick good	0	14
2nd	11:21	4	86	2:27	ILST	Victor Dawson (#5) 69-yard touchdown run, Matt Maldonado (#31) kick good	7	14
2nd	8:09				NDSU	Interception returned 73 yards for touchdown by Nathaniel Staehling (#52), Eli Ozick (#38) kick good	7	21
2nd	0:50	14	82	7:14	ILST	Daniel Sobkowicz (#2) 8-yard touchdown reception from Tommy Rittenhouse (#16), Matt Maldonado (#31) kick good	14	21
4th	12:38	1	4	0:04	NDSU	Barika Kpeenu (#8) 4-yard touchdown run, Eli Ozick (#38) kick good	14	28
4th	2:44	7	41	1:51	ILST	Daniel Sobkowicz (#2) 8-yard touchdown reception from Tommy Rittenhouse (#16), Matt Maldonado (#31) kick good	21	28
4th	1:00	6	23	0:51	ILST	Daniel Sobkowicz (#2) 6-yard touchdown reception from Tommy Rittenhouse (#16), 2-point pass to Scotty Presson Jr. (#11) good	29	28
"TOP" = time of possession. For other American football terms, see Glossary of American football.							29	28

== Roster ==
2025 North Dakota State Bison football team roster
Players
Coaches
Offense

Pos.	#	Name	Class
WR	2	Kellen Entz	Jr
WR	3	RaJa Nelson	Sr
RB	4	Owen Johnson	Sr
WR	5	Bryce Lance (C)	Sr
RB	7	DJ Scott	So
RB	8	Barika Kpeenu	Sr
QB	9	Cole Payton (C)	Sr
QB	10	Trey Drake	So
WR	11	Jacob Kilzer	Fr
QB	12	Nathan Hayes	Jr
QB	13	Zander Smith	Fr
QB	14	Preston Brown	Fr
WR	15	Mekhi Collins	Jr
WR	17	Isiah St. Romain	Fr
WR	18	Jackson Williams	So
WR	19	Chris Harris (C)	Sr
WR	20	Drake Schlosser	Fr
WR	21	Chris Kiel	Fr
RB	22	Charles Ross III	Fr
RB	26	Brady Wavrunek	So
RB	28	Cortez LeGrant	So
WR	30	Kelly Watson	So
RB	32	Barry Kpeenu	So
TE	33	Gabriel Cunningham	Fr
RB	34	Jonathan Harvey	Jr
FB	36	McClain Miller	Fr
TE	40	Kaden Zenzen	Jr
TE	42	Isaac Ellison	Fr
TE	44	Luke Kokat	Jr
RB	45	Myles Mitchell	Fr
FB	46	Truman Werremeyer	Sr
OT	57	Gavin Wang	Fr
G	59	James Nellis	Fr
C	61	Gage Schmidt	Fr
G	62	Griffin Empey	So
C	63	Trent Fraley	Jr
G	66	Jack Liwienski	So
G	67	Kaden Chadwick	Jr
G	68	Coy Okeson	Fr
G	69	Devin Lockerby	Jr
OT	70	Beau Johnson	So
OT	71	Nate Tastad	Fr
G	72	Nate Schneckloth	So
OT	73	Alex Warden	Fr
G	74	Brett Tastad	Fr
OT	75	Josh Magin	Jr
OT	76	Ryan Babatz	Fr
OT	77	Austin Schultz	So
OT	78	Noah Stommes	Fr
WR	80	John Gores	Jr
TE	81	Reis Kessel	Fr
WR	82	SJ Green	Fr
WR	83	Cade Osterman	So
WR	84	Logan Conklin	Fr
TE	85	Jett Zabel	Fr
WR	86	Dylan Vokal	Fr
TE	87	Noah Nelson	Fr
TE	88	Carson Williams	Sr
TE	89	Finn Diggins	Sr

Defense

Pos.	#	Name	Class
CB	0	Jaquise Alexander	Jr
LB	1	Donovan Woolen	So
CB	2	Jailen Duffie	So
S	6	Jaylin Crumby	So
CB	10	Antoine Booth	Sr
DE	11	Chance Symons	Jr
CB	13	Najee Nelson	So
S	14	Taylen Eady	Fr
CB	19	Will Rosenmeyer	Fr
S	20	Will Steil	Fr
LB	21	Noah Taylor	So
S	22	Hudson Artz	Jr
CB	23	Kegan Huber	Jr
CB	24	Anthony Chideme-Alfaro	Sr
LB	25	Ray James	Fr
S	26	Evrett Tait	Fr
S	27	Ryan Jones	Sr
CB	28	Kendrick Carter	Fr
S	29	Darius Givance	Jr
S	30	Jaylen Archibald	Fr
S	31	Mikhale Ford	Fr
LB	32	Austin Altepeter	Jr
S	33	Walker Braaten	Fr
S	34	Landon Meier	Fr
CB	34	Marion Moore	Fr
LB	35	Ryland Satter	Fr
S	38	Ben Schepp	Fr
LB	40	Chase Brixius	Fr
LB	41	Peder Haugo	Fr
LB	42	Alex Elliott	So
LB	43	Logan Kopp (C)	Sr
LB	44	Carter Appl	Fr
LB	45	Gavin Sell	Fr
LB	47	Jacob Wrbanek	Fr
DE	48	Blake Schiltz	Fr
DE	49	Matthew Stenbroten	Fr
LB	50	Damian Devine	Fr
LB	51	Sam Anderson	Fr
LB	52	Nathaniel Staehling (C)	Jr
DT	53	Chase Evink	Fr
DT	54	Alijah Wayne	Fr
LB	55	Oliver Lucht	So
DE	56	Allante Burley	Jr
DT	58	Keenan Wilson	So
DE	60	Thomas Roberts	Fr
DT	64	Jaxon Duttenhefer (C)	Sr
DT	65	Brody Clubb	Fr
DE	69	Carter Dauner	Fr
DE	90	Wyatt Osterbauer	Fr
DT	91	Jack Hansen	Fr
DE	91	Ethan Wood	Fr
DE	92	Kelton McCaslin	Jr
DE	93	Toby Anene	Jr
DT	94	Logan Larson	Jr
DE	95	Zach Vanderpool	Fr
DE	96	Abraham Myers	So
DE	97	Victor Isele	So
DE	98	Jack Iuliano	Sr
DT	99	Obald Niyonkuru	So

Special teams

Pos.	#	Name	Class
K	37	Drew Klein	Jr
K	38	Eli Ozick	So
P	39	Aaron Bickerton	Jr
P	41	Sam Knoll	Fr
LS	48	Caleb Bowers	Jr

Head coach

- Tim Polasek (head coach)

Coordinators/assistant coaches

- Dan Larson (offensive coordinator / tight ends / fullbacks)
- Grant Olson (defensive coordinator / linebackers)
- Joe Beschorner (quarterbacks)
- Dylan Chmura (offensive line)
- Steve Crutchley (wide receivers)
- Will Johnson (cornerbacks)
- Devin Klieman (safeties)
- Kody Morgan (defensive tackles)
- Carlton Littlejohn (defensive ends)
- Sam Ojuri (running backs)
- KeyShawn Carpenter (offensive quality control)
- Tony Moonen (defensive quality control)
- Brett Bostad (offensive analyst)
- David Wienke (defensive anaylst)
- Marcus Williams (defensive analyst)

Legend

- (C) Team captain
- (S) Suspended
- (I) Ineligible
- Injured
- Redshirt

Roster
Last update: November 4, 2025
