= Barika Kpeenu =

American football player (born 2002)

Profile
- Position: Running back

Personal information
- Listed height: 5 ft 10 in (1.78 m)
- Listed weight: 213 lb (97 kg)

Career information
- High school: Sheyenne (West Fargo, North Dakota)
- College: North Dakota State (2021–2025)
- NFL draft: 2026: undrafted

Career history
- Tampa Bay Buccaneers (2026)*
- * Offseason or practice squad member only

Awards and highlights
- 2× FCS national champion (2021, 2024); First-team All-MVFC (2025)
- Stats at ESPN

Barika Kpeenu is an American professional football running back. He played college football for the North Dakota State Bison.

== Early life ==
Kpeenu grew up in West Fargo, North Dakota and attended Sheyenne High School. As a senior, he rushed for 1,052 yards and 13 touchdowns. Kpeenu committed to play college football at North Dakota State University (NDSU).

== College career ==
Kpeenu redshirted his true freshman season with the Bison. He played in three games and rushed 52 yards and one touchdown as a redshirt freshman. Kpeenu 501 yards and four touchdowns during his redshirt sophomore season. He rushed for 725 yards and seven touchdowns on 132 carries as NDSU won the 2024 FCS national championship. Kpeenu was named first-team All-Missouri Valley Football Conference as a redshirt senior after rushing for 1,005 yards and 20 touchdowns while also catching 20 passes for 247 yards and a touchdown.

=== College statistics ===
Year	Team	Games		Receiving				Rushing			
Year	Team	GP	GS	Rec	Yds	Avg	TD	Att	Yds	Avg	TD
2021	North Dakota State	0	0	Redshirt							
2022	North Dakota State	3	0	0	0	0.0	0	15	52	3.5	1
2023	North Dakota State	15	0	1	7	7.0	0	96	502	5.2	4
2024	North Dakota State	16	6	15	122	8.1	1	132	718	5.4	7
2025	North Dakota State	13	13	20	247	12.4	1	191	1,005	5.3	20
Career		47	19	35	369	10.5	2	434	2,277	5.2	32

== Professional career ==
Pre-draft measurables
Height	Weight	Arm length	Hand span	Wingspan	40-yard dash	10-yard split	20-yard split	20-yard shuttle	Three-cone drill	Vertical jump	Broad jump	Bench press
5 ft 9 5/8 in (1.77 m)	213 lb (97 kg)	32 1/4 in (0.82 m)	9 3/8 in (0.24 m)	6 ft 2 3/8 in (1.89 m)	4.66 s	1.59 s	2.71 s	4.33 s	7.00 s	33.5 in (0.85 m)	10 ft 3 in (3.12 m)	28 reps
All values from Pro Day

After going undrafted in the 2026 NFL draft, Kpeenu attended the Los Angeles Chargers' rookie minicamp and worked out for the Carolina Panthers in May before ultimately being signed by the Tampa Bay Buccaneers on August 16, 2026. He was waived by the Buccaneers on August 29. On October 27, he was signed to the practice squad. On November 10, Kpeenu was released.
