= Cole Payton =

American football player (born 2002)

No. 18 – Philadelphia Eagles
- Position: Quarterback
- Roster status: Active

Personal information
- Born: October 26, 2002 (age 24)
- Listed height: 6 ft 3 in (1.91 m)
- Listed weight: 232 lb (105 kg)

Career information
- High school: Westside (Omaha, Nebraska)
- College: North Dakota State (2021–2025)
- NFL draft: 2026: 5th round, 178th overall pick

Career history
- Philadelphia Eagles (2026–present)

Awards and highlights
- 2× FCS national champion (2021, 2024); Second-team All-MVFC (2025)

Career NFL statistics
- Games played: 1
- Stats at Pro Football Reference
- Stats at Pro Football Reference

Cole Payton (born October 26, 2002) is an American professional football quarterback for the Philadelphia Eagles of the National Football League (NFL). He played college football for the North Dakota State Bison, receiving second-team All-MVFC honors in 2025. Payton was selected by the Eagles in the fifth round of the 2026 NFL draft.

== Early life ==
Payton grew up in Omaha, Nebraska, and attended Westside High School. He was named the Nebraska Gatorade Player of the Year after passing for 1,704 yards and 22 touchdowns while also rushing for 1,029 yards and 17 touchdowns. Payton committed to play college football at North Dakota State. He maintained his commitment despite late recruiting pushes from Iowa State and Nebraska to be a walk on. He is a left-handed quarterback.

== College career ==
Payton played in three games during his true freshman while maintaining a redshirt on the season. Payton was used in various play packages as a redshirt sophomore and rushed for 615 yards and 13 touchdowns while also completing 18 of 27 passes for 289 yards and three touchdowns. Payton completed 10 of 16 passes for 123 yards with two touchdowns and one interception and rushed for 164 yards and one touchdown as a redshirt junior before suffering a season-ending injury. Payton was named the starting quarterback going into his redshirt senior season.

=== College statistics ===
Year	Team	Games		Passing								Rushing				Receiving			
Year	Team	GP	GS	Cmp	Att	Pct	Yds	Avg	TD	Int	Rtg	Att	Yds	Avg	TD	Rec	Yds	Avg	TD
2021	North Dakota State	3	0	1	3	33.3	6	2.0	0	0	50.1	8	78	9.8	2	0	0	0.0	0
2022	North Dakota State	13	0	8	12	66.7	51	4.3	0	1	85.7	38	284	7.5	2	0	0	0.0	0
2023	North Dakota State	15	0	18	27	66.7	289	10.7	3	0	193.2	84	615	7.3	13	1	14	14.0	0
2024	North Dakota State	8	0	10	16	62.5	125	7.8	2	1	156.9	21	165	7.9	1	2	5	2.5	0
2025	North Dakota State	13	13	162	225	72.0	2,719	12.1	16	4	193.4	136	777	5.7	13	0	0	0.0	0
Career		52	13	199	283	70.3	3,190	11.3	21	6	185.3	287	1,919	6.7	31	3	19	6.3	0

== Professional career ==
Pre-draft measurables
Height	Weight	Arm length	Hand span	Wingspan	40-yard dash	10-yard split	20-yard split	20-yard shuttle	Three-cone drill	Vertical jump	Broad jump
6 ft 2 5/8 in (1.90 m)	232 lb (105 kg)	31 5/8 in (0.80 m)	10 1/4 in (0.26 m)	6 ft 6 3/4 in (2.00 m)	4.56 s	1.57 s	2.64 s	4.36 s	7.12 s	40.0 in (1.02 m)	10 ft 10 in (3.30 m)
All values from NFL Combine

Payton was selected by the Philadelphia Eagles in the fifth round with the 178th overall pick in the 2026 NFL draft. He officially signed a rookie scale contract for four-years, $4.62 million on May 1.

Payton made his professional debut on August 15, 2026 during the first preseason game against the Baltimore Ravens, where he completed 4 out of 9 passes for 37 yards and a touchdown.
