= 2025 Youngstown State Penguins football team =

American college football season

2025 Youngstown State Penguins football

NCAA Division I First Round, L 42–43 vs. Yale
- Conference: Missouri Valley Football Conference

Ranking
- STATS: No. 18
- FCS Coaches: No. 17
- Record: 8–5 (5–3 MVFC)
- Head coach: Doug Phillips (6th season)
- Offensive coordinator: Mike Yurcich (1st season)
- Offensive scheme: Pro spread
- Defensive coordinator: John Haneline (2nd season)
- Base defense: 4–2–5
- Home stadium: Stambaugh Stadium

2025 Missouri Valley Football Conference standings
	Conf.			Overall
Team	W		L	W		L
No. 4т North Dakota State $^	8	–	0	12	–	1
No. 9 South Dakota ^	6	–	2	10	–	5
No. 2 Illinois State ^	5	–	3	12	–	5
No. 14 North Dakota ^	5	–	3	8	–	6
No. 18 Youngstown State ^	5	–	3	8	–	5
No. 13 South Dakota State ^	4	–	4	9	–	5
No. 25 Southern Illinois	4	–	4	7	–	5
Northern Iowa	1	–	7	3	–	9
Murray State	1	–	7	1	–	11
Indiana State	1	–	7	3	–	9
$ – Conference champion; ^ – FCS playoff participant; Rankings from STATS Poll

The 2025 Youngstown State Penguins football team represented Youngstown State University as a member of the Missouri Valley Football Conference (MVFC) during the 2025 NCAA Division I FCS football season. The Penguins were led by sixth-year head coach Doug Phillips, and played their games at Stambaugh Stadium located in Youngstown, Ohio.

== Preseason ==
=== MVFC poll ===
The Missouri Valley Football Conference released its preseason poll on July 21, 2025, voted on by league athletic directors, coaches, and media members. The Penguins were predicted to finish fifth in the conference.

== Schedule ==
Date	Time	Opponent	Rank	Site	TV	Result	Attendance
August 28	6:00 p.m.	Mercyhurst*		Stambaugh Stadium; Youngstown, OH	ESPN+	W 24–15	7,040
September 6	2:00 p.m.	Robert Morris*		Stambaugh Stadium; Youngstown, OH	ESPN+	W 56–17	12,042
September 13	3:30 p.m.	at Michigan State*		Spartan Stadium; East Lansing, MI	BTN	L 24–41	71,301
September 20	6:00 p.m.	at Towson*		Johnny Unitas Stadium; Towson, MD	FloFootball	W 31–28	6,042
October 4	6:00 p.m.	No. 2 South Dakota State	No. 24	Stambaugh Stadium; Youngstown, OH	ESPN+	L 30–35	11,068
October 11	3:00 p.m.	at No. 13 North Dakota		Alerus Center; Grand Forks, ND	ESPN+	L 17–35	11,960
October 18	1:00 p.m.	at No. 10 Illinois State		Hancock Stadium; Normal, IL	ESPN+	W 40−35	9,834
October 25	2:00 p.m.	Murray State^{†}	No. 22	Stambaugh Stadium; Youngstown, OH	ESPN+	W 51–17	9,664
November 1	3:30 p.m.	at No. 1 North Dakota State	No. 18	Fargodome; Fargo, ND	ESPN+	L 30–38	14,607
November 8	2:00 p.m.	No. 15 Southern Illinois	No. 21	Stambaugh Stadium; Youngstown, OH	ESPN+	W 48–38	8,448
November 15	12:00 p.m.	Indiana State	No. 20	Stambaugh Stadium; Youngstown, OH	ESPN+	W 48–29	7,392
November 22	2:00 p.m.	at Northern Iowa	No. 18	UNI-Dome; Cedar Falls, IA	ESPN+	W 35–32	7,361
November 29	12:00 p.m.	No. 24 Yale*	No. 14	Stambaugh Stadium; Youngstown, OH (NCAA Division I First Round)	ESPN+	L 42–43	4,869
*Non-conference game; ^{†}Homecoming; Rankings from STATS Poll released prior to the game; All times are in Eastern time

== Game summaries ==
All times are Eastern time.

=== Mercyhurst ===
Mercyhurst Lakers (0–0) at Youngstown State Penguins (0–0) – Game summary

Quarter	1	2	3	4	Total
Lakers	7	0	0	8	15
Penguins	7	14	3	0	24

at Stambaugh Stadium, Youngstown, OH

- Date: August 28
- Game time: 6:00 p.m.
- Game weather: Rain • Temperature: 65 °F (18 °C) • Wind: SW at 10 miles per hour (16 km/h)
- Game attendance: 7,040
- Referee: Jason Perkins
- TV announcers (ESPN+): Drae Smith (play-by-play) and Chris Sammarone (analyst)
- Box score, Recap

Game information
First quarter
- (9:24) YSU – Jaden Gilbert 1-yard run, Andrew Lastovka kick (Drive: 11 plays, 69 yards, 5:29; YSU 7–0)
- (1:08) MERC – Evan Van Dyke 1-yard pass from Adam Urena, Max Young kick (Drive: 14 plays, 81 yards, 8:08; Tied 7–7)

Second quarter

- (11:17) YSU – Beau Brungard 4-yard run, Andrew Lastovka kick (Drive: 11 plays, 47 yards, 4:42; YSU 14–7)
- (8:54) YSU – Beau Brungard 4-yard run, Andrew Lastovka kick (Drive: 3 plays, 50 yards, 0:47; YSU 21–7)

Third quarter

- (11:10) YSU – Andrew Lastovka 37-yard field goal (Drive: 6 plays, 13 yards, 3:04; YSU 24–7)

Fourth quarter

- (6:59) MERC – Dylan Evans 8-yard pass from Adam Urena, Adam Urena pass to Dylan Evans for two-point conversion (Drive: 15 plays, 84 yards, 7:14; YSU 24–15)

Statistics	MERC	YSU
First downs	20	16
Total yards	374	301
Rushing yards	63	187
Passing yards	311	114
Passing: Comp–Att–Int	32–48–2	14–21–0
Time of possession	34:14	25:46

Team	Category	Player	Statistics
Mercyhurst	Passing	Adam Urena	32/48, 311 yards, 2 TD, 2 INT
Mercyhurst	Rushing	Brian Trobel	7 carries, 40 yards
Mercyhurst	Receiving	Dylan Evans	7 receptions, 95 yards, TD
Youngstown State	Passing	Beau Brungard	14/21, 114 yards
Youngstown State	Rushing	Beau Brungard	28 carries, 145 yards, 2 TD
Youngstown State	Receiving	Max Tomczak	2 receptions, 43 yards

=== Robert Morris ===
Robert Morris Colonials (0–1) at Youngstown State Penguins (1–0) – Game summary

Quarter	1	2	3	4	Total
Colonials	3	0	0	14	17
Penguins	14	28	14	0	56

at Stambaugh Stadium, Youngstown, OH

- Date: September 6
- Game time: 2:00 p.m.
- Game weather: Cloudy • Temperature: 67 °F (19 °C) • Wind: SW at 10 miles per hour (16 km/h)
- Game attendance: 12,042
- Referee: Tyler Downs
- TV announcers (ESPN+): Drae Smith (play-by-play) and Chris Sammarone (analyst)
- Box score, Recap

Game information
First quarter
- (8:19) RMU – Jayson Jenkins 46-yard field goal (Drive: 11 plays, 46 yards, 6:41; RMU 3–0)
- (4:41) YSU – Max Tomczak 1-yard pass from Beau Brungard, Andrew Lastovka kick (Drive: 8 plays, 91 yards, 3:33; YSU 7–3)
- (3:03) YSU – Beau Brungard 72-yard run, Andrew Lastovka kick (Drive: 2 plays, 78 yards, 0:36; YSU 14–3)

Second quarter

- (13:45) YSU – Beau Brungard 20-yard run, Andrew Lastovka kick (Drive: 6 plays, 63 yards, 3:12; YSU 21–3)
- (9:37) YSU – Antuan Gardner 2-yard run, Andrew Lastovka kick (Drive: 2 plays, 80 yards, 1:00; YSU 28–3)
- (1:54) YSU – Beau Brungard 4-yard run, Andrew Lastovka kick (Drive: 12 plays, 85 yards, 5:02; YSU 35–3)
- (0:12) YSU – Kylon Wilson 4-yard run, Andrew Lastovka kick (Drive: 5 plays, 17 yards, 1:31; YSU 42–3)

Third quarter

- (12:51) YSU – Beau Brungard 28-yard run, Andrew Lastovka kick (Drive: 4 plays, 69 yards, 2:00; YSU 49–3)
- (7:04) YSU – Tahir Mills 18-yard run, Andrew Lastovka kick (Drive: 7 plays, 80 yards, 4:13; YSU 56–3)

Fourth quarter

- (13:16) RMU – Thomas Lee 34-yard pass from Zach Tanner, Jayson Jenkins kick (Drive: 6 plays, 49 yards, 2:57; YSU 56–10)
- (1:29) RMU – Kai Holloway 16-yard pass from Zach Tanner, Jayson Jenkins kick (Drive: 12 plays, 80 yards, 5:56; YSU 56–17)

Statistics	RMU	YSU
First downs	14	27
Total yards	233	593
Rushing yards	41	424
Passing yards	192	169
Passing: Comp–Att–Int	16–29–0	20–24–0
Time of possession	28:40	31:20

Team	Category	Player	Statistics
Robert Morris	Passing	Zach Tanner	16/29, 192 yards, 2 TD
Robert Morris	Rushing	Donta Whack	10 carries, 37 yards
Robert Morris	Receiving	Thomas Lee	5 receptions, 75 yards, TD
Youngstown State	Passing	Beau Brungard	12/16, 122 yards, TD
Youngstown State	Rushing	Beau Brungard	10 carries, 264 yards, 4 TD
Youngstown State	Receiving	Max Tomczak	5 receptions, 69 yards, TD

=== at Michigan State (FBS) ===
Youngstown State Penguins (2–0) at Michigan State Spartans (FBS) (2–0) – Game summary

Quarter	1	2	3	4	Total
Penguins	3	7	7	7	24
Spartans (FBS)	7	10	14	10	41

at Spartan Stadium, East Lansing, MI

- Date: September 13
- Game time: 3:30 p.m.
- Game weather: Sunny • Temperature: 76 °F (24 °C) • Wind: N at 5 miles per hour (8.0 km/h)
- Game attendance: 71,301
- Referee: Gregory Bloom
- TV announcers (BTN): Guy Haberman (play-by-play) and Yogi Roth (analyst)
- Box score, Recap

Game information
First quarter
- (7:21) YSU – Andrew Lastovka 28-yard field goal (Drive: 15 plays, 65 yards, 7:39; YSU 3–0)
- (1:13) MSU – Rodney Bullard Jr. 8-yard run, Martin Connington kick (Drive: 10 plays, 82 yards, 6:01; MSU 7–3)

Second quarter

- (8:07) MSU – Makhi Frazier 1-yard run, Martin Connington kick (Drive: 12 plays, 87 yards, 6:37; MSU 14–3)
- (5:59) YSU – Jaden Gilbert 1-yard run, Andrew Lastovka kick (Drive: 4 plays, 65 yards, 2:08; MSU 14–10)
- (0:00) MSU – Martin Connington 24-yard field goal (Drive: 9 plays, 70 yards, 1:14; MSU 17–10)

Third quarter

- (10:57) MSU – Brandon Tullis 4-yard run, Martin Connington kick (Drive: 1 play, 4 yards, 0:04; MSU 24–10)
- (6:22) MSU – Michael Masunas 28-yard pass from Aidan Chiles, Martin Connington kick (Drive: 6 plays, 64 yards, 3:32; MSU 31–10)
- (1:17) YSU – RK Dandridge 3-yard pass from Beau Brungard, Andrew Lastovka kick (Drive: 8 plays, 80 yards, 4:59; MSU 31–17)

Fourth quarter

- (8:44) MSU – Martin Connington 27-yard field goal (Drive: 11 plays, 71 yards, 6:11; MSU 34–17)
- (3:05) YSU – Kylon Wilson 19-yard pass from Beau Brungard, Andrew Lastovka kick (Drive: 11 plays, 75 yards, 5:39; MSU 34–24)
- (1:48) MSU – Elijah Tau-Tolliver 22-yard run, Martin Connington kick (Drive: 5 plays, 45 yards, 1:16; MSU 41–24)

Statistics	YSU	MSU
First downs	14	23
Plays–yards	61–339	62–444
Rushes–yards	26–97	33–174
Passing yards	242	270
Passing: comp–att–int	24–35–1	22–29–1
Turnovers	1	1
Time of possession	29:54	30:06

Team	Category	Player	Statistics
Youngstown State	Passing	Beau Brungard	24/34, 242 yards, 2 TD, INT
Youngstown State	Rushing	Jaden Gilbert	7 carries, 72 yards, TD
Youngstown State	Receiving	Max Tomczak	7 receptions, 78 yards
Michigan State	Passing	Aidan Chiles	22/29, 270 yards, TD, INT
Michigan State	Rushing	Aidan Chiles	8 carries, 76 yards
Michigan State	Receiving	Nick Marsh	6 receptions, 94 yards

=== at Towson ===
Youngstown State Penguins (2–1) at Towson Tigers (2–1) – Game summary

Quarter	1	2	3	4	Total
Penguins	7	0	10	14	31
Tigers	0	14	7	7	28

at Johnny Unitas Stadium, Towson, MD

- Date: September 20
- Game time: 6:00 p.m.
- Game weather: Sunny
- Game attendance: 6,042
- Referee: Eric Lewis
- TV announcers (FloFootball): Spiro Morekas (play-by-play) and Gordy Combs (analyst)
- Box score, Recap

Game information
First quarter
- (4:21) YSU – Beau Brungard 1-yard run, Andrew Lastovka kick (Drive: 11 plays, 80 yards, 5:32; YSU 7–0)

Second quarter

- (14:10) TOW – Al Wooten II 2-yard run, Caden Williams kick (Drive: 4 plays, 69 yards, 2:04; Tied 7–7)
- (8:03) TOW – Kemarrion Battles 33-yard pass from John Dunmore, Caden Williams kick (DriveL 8 plays, 64 yards, 4:49; TOW 14–7)

Third quarter

- (12:11) YSU – Alex McDonald 2-yard pass from Beau Brungard, Andrew Lastovka kick (Drive: 6 plays, 23 yards, 2:40; Tied 14–14)
- (6:02) TOW – John Dunmore 19-yard pass from Andrew Indorf, Caden Williams kick (Drive: 12 plays, 75 yards, 6:09; TOW 21–14)
- (0:08) YSU – Andrew Lastovka 27-yard field goal (Drive: 11 plays, 62 yards, 5:47; TOW 21–17)

Fourth quarter

- (12:09) TOW – Al Wooten II 1-yard run, Caden Williams kick (Drive: 7 plays, 81 yards, 2:54; TOW 28–17)
- (6:21) YSU – Beau Brungard 2-yard run, Beau Brungard pass to Max Tomczak for two-point conversion (Drive: 12 plays, 75 yards, 5:48; TOW 28–25)
- (1:37) YSU – Andrew Lastovka 48-yard field goal (Drive: 9 plays, 41 yards, 3:16; Tied 28–28)
- (0:00) YSU – Andrew Lastovka 42-yard field goal (Drive: 9 plays, 40 yards, 0:37; YSU 31–28)

Statistics	YSU	TOW
First downs	23	19
Total yards	426	378
Rushing yards	149	93
Passing yards	277	285
Passing: Comp–Att–Int	24–41–0	20–31–1
Time of possession	32:51	27:09

Team	Category	Player	Statistics
Youngstown State	Passing	Beau Brungard	24/41, 277 yards, TD
Youngstown State	Rushing	Beau Brungard	18 carries, 100 yards, 2 TD
Youngstown State	Receiving	Max Tomczak	7 receptions, 116 yards
Towson	Passing	Andrew Indorf	18/29, 238 yards, TD, INT
Towson	Rushing	Al Wooten II	12 carries, 48 yards, 2 TD
Towson	Receiving	Jaceon Doss	3 receptions, 120 yards

=== No. 2 South Dakota State ===
No. 2 South Dakota State Jackrabbits (4–0) vs. No. 24 Youngstown State Penguins (3–1) – Game summary

Quarter	1	2	3	4	Total
No. 2 Jackrabbits	0	7	21	7	35
No. 24 Penguins	7	10	0	13	30

at Stambaugh Stadium, Youngstown, OH

- Date: October 4
- Game time: 6:00 p.m.
- Game weather: Sunny • Temperature: 82 °F (28 °C) • Wind: SW at 5 miles per hour (8.0 km/h)
- Game attendance: 11,068
- Referee: John Shay
- TV announcers (ESPN+): Drae Smith (play-by-play) and Frank Stams (analyst)
- Box score, Recap

Game information
First quarter
- (11:52) YSU – Max Tomczak 23-yard pass from Beau Brungard, Andrew Lastovka kick (Drive: 3 plays, 47 yards, 1:17; YSU 7–0)

Second quarter

- (14:00) YSU – Beau Brungard 4-yard run, Andrew Lastovka kick (Drive: 15 plays, 80 yards, 6:59; YSU 14–0)
- (4:58) SDST – Greyton Gannon 4-yard pass from Chase Mason, Eli Stader kick (Drive: 9 plays, 90 yards, 3:41; YSU 14–7)
- (2:23) YSU – Andrew Lastovka 29-yard field goal (Drive: 5 plays, 71 yards, 2:29; YSU 17–7)

Third quarter

- (12:50) SDST – Julius Loughridge 3-yard run, Eli Stader kick (Drive: 2 plays, 54 yards, 0:35; YSU 17–14)
- (5:54) SDST – Julius Loughridge 14-yard run, Eli Stader kick (Drive: 7 plays, 75 yards, 3:49; SDST 21–17)
- (2:18) SDST – Julius Loughridge 2-yard run, Eli Stader kick (Drive: 6 plays, 57 yards, 2:35; SDST 28–17)

Fourth quarter

- (10:31) YSU – Max Tomczak 29-yard pass from Beau Brungard, Andrew Lastovka kick (Drive: 3 plays, 59 yards, 1:26; SDST 28–24)
- (3:17) SDST – Julius Loughridge 24-yard run, Eli Stader kick (Drive: 3 plays, 40 yards, 1:43; SDST 35–24)
- (0:38) YSU – Max Tomczak 2-yard pass from Beau Brungard, two-point conversion failed (Drive: 10 plays, 72 yards, 2:37; SDST 35–30)

Statistics	SDST	YSU
First downs	20	25
Total yards	405	431
Rushing yards	216	156
Passing yards	189	275
Passing: Comp–Att–Int	14–29–1	29–44–0
Time of possession	29:31	30:29

Team	Category	Player	Statistics
South Dakota State	Passing	Chase Mason	14/29, 189 yards, TD, INT
South Dakota State	Rushing	Julius Loughridge	25 carries, 176 yards, 4 TD
South Dakota State	Receiving	Alex Bullock	10 receptions, 162 yards
Youngstown State	Passing	Beau Brungard	29/44, 275 yards, 3 TD
Youngstown State	Rushing	Beau Brungard	22 carries, 130 yards, TD
Youngstown State	Receiving	Max Tomczak	8 receptions, 92 yards, 3 TD

=== at No. 13 North Dakota ===
Youngstown State Penguins (3–2) vs. No. 13 North Dakota Fighting Hawks (3–2) – Game summary

Quarter	1	2	3	4	Total
Penguins	0	7	10	0	17
No. 13 Fighting Hawks	14	14	0	7	35

at Alerus Center, Grand Forks, ND

- Date: October 11
- Game time: 4:00 p.m.
- Game weather: Indoors • Temperature: 72 °F (22 °C)
- Game attendance: 11,960
- Referee: Jason Berg
- TV announcers (ESPN+): Alex Heinert (play-by-play) and Ryan Kasowski (analyst)
- Box score, Recap

Game information
First quarter
- (8:18) UND – B.J. Fleming 9-yard pass from Jerry Kaminski, C.J. Elrichs kick (Drive: 9 plays, 67 yards, 4:27; UND 7–0)
- (2:44) UND – Haydn Stay 21-yard pass from Jerry Kaminski, C.J. Elrichs kick (Drive: 9 plays, 59 yards, 4:03; UND 14–0)

Second quarter

- (13:27) YSU – Mike Solomon 20-yard pass from Beau Brungard, Andrew Lastovka kick (Drive: 8 plays, 42 yards, 4:08; UND 14–7)
- (12:49) UND – Gaven Ziebarth 51-yard run, C.J. Elrichs kick (Drive: 2 plays, 58 yards, 0:32; UND 21–7)
- (8:08) UND – B.J. Fleming 14-yard pass from Jerry Kaminski, C.J. Elrichs kick (Drive: 5 plays, 48 yards, 2:17; UND 28–7)

Third quarter

- (7:44) YSU – Andrew Lastovka 34-yard field goal (Drive: 5 plays, 45 yards, 1:29; UND 28–10)
- (4:22) YSU – Kylon Wilson 37-yard pass from Beal Brungard, Andrew Lastovka kick (Drive: 4 plays, 86 yards, 1:25; UND 28–17)

Fourth quarter

- (6:40) UND – Gaven Ziebarth 1-yard run, C.J. Elrichs kick (Drive: 16 plays, 72 yards, 7:57; UND 35–17)

Statistics	YSU	UND
First downs	17	21
Total yards	377	374
Rushing yards	108	228
Passing yards	269	146
Passing: Comp–Att–Int	18–33–0	17–27–0
Time of possession	28:04	31:56

Team	Category	Player	Statistics
Youngstown State	Passing	Beau Brungard	18/33, 269 yards, 2 TD
Youngstown State	Rushing	Beau Brungard	19 carries, 71 yards
Youngstown State	Receiving	Ky Wilson	4 receptions, 102 yards, TD
North Dakota	Passing	Jerry Kaminski	17/27, 146 yards, 3 TD
North Dakota	Rushing	Sawyer Seidl	20 carries, 114 yards
North Dakota	Receiving	B.J. Fleming	5 receptions, 84 yards, 2 TD

=== at No. 10 Illinois State ===
Youngstown State Penguins (3–3) vs. No. 10 Illinois State Redbirds (4–2) – Game summary

Quarter	1	2	3	4	Total
Penguins	6	6	7	21	40
No. 10 Redbirds	0	14	14	7	35

at Hancock Stadium, Normal, IL

- Date: October 18
- Game time: 1:00 p.m.
- Game weather: Cloudy • Temperature: 75 °F (24 °C) • Wind: SW at 15 miles per hour (24 km/h)
- Game attendance: 9,834
- Referee: David Hergert
- TV announcers (ESPN+): Kurt Pegler (play-by-play), Clay Harbor (analyst) and Kacy Standohar (sideline)
- Box score, Recap

Game information
First quarter
- (9:37) YSU – Andrew Lastovka 32-yard field goal (Drive: 11 plays, 61 yards, 5:16; YSU 3–0)
- (4:40) YSU – Andrew Lastovka 23-yard field goal (Drive: 9 plays, 30 yards, 4:16; YSU 6–0)

Second quarter

- (8:49) YSU – Beau Brungard 2-yard run, two-point conversion failed (Drive: 13 plays, 92 yards, 7:27; YSU 12–0)
- (6:45) ILST – Javon Charles 13-yard pass from Tommy Rittenhouse, Matt Maldonado kick (Drive: 6 plays, 75 yards, 2:04; YSU 12–7)
- (0:31) ILST – Wenkers Wright 12-yard pass from Tommy Rittenhouse, Matt Maldonado kick (Drive: 3 plays, 39 yards, 0:18; ILST 14–12)

Third quarter

- (14:43) ILST – Eddie Kasper 37-yard pass from Tommy Rittenhouse, Matt Maldonado kick (Drive: 1 play, 37 yards, 0:08; ILST 21–12)
- (10:41) YSU – Mike Solomon 36-yard pass from Beau Brungard, Andrew Lastovka kick (Drive: 8 plays, 75 yards, 4:02; ILST 21–19)
- (2:43) ILST – Luke Mailander 18-yard pass from Tommy Rittenhouse, Matt Maldonado kick (Drive: 4 plays, 44 yards, 1:35; ILST 28–19)

Fourth quarter

- (11:52) YSU – Beau Brungard 1-yard run, Andrew Lastovka kick (Drive: 11 plays, 81 yards, 5:45; ILST 28–26)
- (8:06) YSU – Fresh Walter 53-yard pass from Beau Brungard, Andrew Lastovka kick (Drive: 5 plays, 79 yards, 1:56; YSU 33–28)
- (5:51) YSU – Beau Brungard 48-yard run, Andrew Lastovka kick (Drive: 2 plays, 52 yards, 0:53; YSU 40–28)
- (3:12) ILST – Wenkers Wright 3-yard pass from Tommy Rittenhouse, Matt Maldonado kick (Drive: 11 plays, 75 yards, 2:39; YSU 40–35)

Statistics	YSU	ILST
First downs	27	23
Total yards	561	348
Rushing yards	233	142
Passing yards	328	206
Passing: Comp–Att–Int	23–34–1	16–30–2
Time of possession	39:15	20:45

Team	Category	Player	Statistics
Youngstown State	Passing	Beau Brungard	23/34, 328 yards, 2 TD, INT
Youngstown State	Rushing	Beau Brungard	30 carries, 200 yards, 3 TD
Youngstown State	Receiving	Ethan Wright	4 receptions, 86 yards
Illinois State	Passing	Tommy Rittenhouse	16/29, 206 yards, 5 TD, 2 INT
Illinois State	Rushing	Tommy Rittenhouse	10 carries, 65 yards
Illinois State	Receiving	Luke Mailander	4 receptions, 51 yards, TD

=== Murray State ===
Murray State Racers (0–7) vs. No. 22 Youngstown State Penguins (4–3) – Game summary

Quarter	1	2	3	4	Total
Racers	7	0	0	10	17
No. 22 Penguins	7	17	14	3	41

at Stambaugh Stadium, Youngstown, OH

- Date: October 25
- Game time: 1:00 p.m.
- Game weather: Sunny • Wind: SW at 5 miles per hour (8.0 km/h)
- Game attendance: 9,664
- Referee: Carl Chapman
- TV announcers (ESPN+): Drae Smith (play-by-play) and Chris Sammarone (analyst)
- Box score, Recap

Game information
First quarter
- (10:48) MUR – Lucas Desjardins 32-yard pass from Tim Ogle, Jack Tannehill kick (Drive: 9 plays, 75 yards, 4:12; MUR 7–0)
- (7:03) YSU – Beau Brungard 5-yard run, Andrew Lastovka kick (Drive: 7 plays, 56 yards, 3:41; Tied 7–7)

Second quarter

- (10:32) YSU – Ethan Wright 1-yard run, Andrew Lastovka kick (Drive: 15 plays, 91 yards, 7:51; YSU 14–7)
- (5:39) YSU – Kylon Wilson 62-yard pass from Beau Brungard, Andrew Lastovka kick (Drive: 5 plays, 72 yards, 2:47; YSU 21–7)
- (0:06) YSU – Andrew Lastovka 34-yard field goal (Drive: 10 plays, 75 yards, 2:58; YSU 24–7)

Third quarter

- (12:08) YSU – Beau Brungard 50-yard pass from Fresh Walter, Andrew Lastovka kick (Drive: 6 plays, 76 yards, 2:45; YSU 31–7)
- (7:00) YSU – Beau Brungard 1-yard run, Andrew Lastovka kick (Drive: 9 plays, 62 yards, 4:16; YSU 38–7)

Fourth quarter

- (13:34) MUR – Jack Tannehill 38-yard field goal (Drive: 7 plays, 40 yards, 3:41; YSU 38–10)
- (13:15) YSU – Kylon Wilson 100-yard kickoff return, Andrew Lastovka kick (YSU 45–10)
- (11:22) MUR – Cam Bulluck 17-yard pass from Baxter Wright, Jack Tannehill kick (Drive: 5 plays, 48 yards, 1:45; YSU 45–17)
- (7:04) YSU – Max Tomczak 2-yard pass from Beau Brungard, Jonathan Schmidt kick failed (Drive: 8 plays, 62 yards, 4:12; YSU 51–17)

Statistics	MUR	YSU
First downs	15	26
Total yards	271	539
Rushing yards	79	241
Passing yards	192	298
Passing: Comp–Att–Int	19–29–1	23–27–0
Time of possession	24:14	35:46

Team	Category	Player	Statistics
Murray State	Passing	Jim Ogle	11/20, 102 yards, TD, INT
Murray State	Rushing	Baxter Wright	7 carries, 30 yards
Murray State	Receiving	Lucas Desjardins	3 receptions, 47 yards, TD
Youngstown State	Passing	Beau Brungard	22/25, 248 yards, 2 TD
Youngstown State	Rushing	Beau Brungard	15 carries, 64 yards, 2 TD
Youngstown State	Receiving	Kylon Wilson	5 receptions, 89 yards, TD

=== at No. 1 North Dakota State ===
No. 18 Youngstown State Penguins (5–3) vs. No. 1 North Dakota State Bison (8–0) – Game summary

Quarter	1	2	3	4	Total
No. 18 Penguins	3	17	3	7	30
No. 1 Bison	7	21	7	3	38

at Fargodome, Fargo, ND

- Date: November 1
- Game time: 3:30 p.m.
- Game weather: Indoors; 70 °F (21 °C)
- Game attendance: 14,607
- Referee: John Shay
- TV announcers (ESPN+): Dom Izzo (play-by-play), Kyle Emanuel (analyst) and Sam Goetzinger (sideline)
- Box score, Recap

Game information
First quarter
- (6:22) YSU – Andrew Lastovka 47-yard field goal (Drive: 11 plays, 43 yards, 7:16; YSU 3–0)
- (0:41) NDSU – Barika Kpeenu 1-yard run, Eli Ozick (Drive: 11 plays, 56 yards, 5:34; NDSU 7–3)

Second quarter

- (10:43) YSU – Beau Brungard 10-yard run, Andrew Lastovka kick (Drive: 9 plays, 68 yards, 4:51; YSU 10–7)
- (4:52) NDSU – DJ Scott 3-yard run, Eli Ozick kick (Drive: 4 plays, 19 yards, 1:07; NDSU 14–10)
- (4:17) NDSU – Barika Kpeenu 4-yard run, Eli Ozick kick (Drive: 2 plays, 9 yards. 0:30; NDSU 21–10)
- (1:49) YSU – Alex McDonald 16-yard pass from Beau Brungard, Andrew Lastovka kick (Drive: 6 plays, 46 yards, 2:19; NDSU 21–17)
- (1:32) NDSU – Jackson Williams 100-yard kickoff return, Eli Ozick kick (NDSU 28–17)
- (0:08) YSU – Andrew Lastovka 49-yard field goal (Drive: 7 plays, 44 yards, 1:24; NDSU 28–20)

Third quarter

- (12:51) YSU – Andrew Lastovka 42-yard field goal (Drive: 7 plays, 51 yards, 2:09; NDSU 28–23)
- (6:22) NDSU – Barika Kpeenu 1-yard run, Eli Ozick kick (Drive: 12 plays, 84 yards, 6:23; NDSU 35–23)

Fourth quarter

- (13:54) YSU – Beau Brungard 2-yard run, Andrew Lastovka kick (Drive: 7 plays, 65 yards, 2:53; NDSU 35–30)
- (6:20) NDSU – Eli Ozick 21-yard field goal (Drive: 12 plays, 73 yards, 7:25; NDSU 38–30)

Statistics	YSU	NDSU
First downs	21	18
Total yards	371	327
Rushing yards	168	133
Passing yards	203	194
Passing: Comp–Att–Int	19–30–1	17–24–1
Time of possession	26:45	33:15

Team	Category	Player	Statistics
Youngstown State	Passing	Beau Brungard	19/30, 203 yards, TD, INT
Youngstown State	Rushing	Jaden Gilbert	6 carries, 63 yards
Youngstown State	Receiving	Max Tomczak	5 receptions, 59 yards
North Dakota State	Passing	Cole Payton	17/24, 194 yards, INT
North Dakota State	Rushing	Barika Kpeenu	15 carries, 74 yards, 3 TD
North Dakota State	Receiving	Bryce Lance	5 receptions, 65 yards

=== No. 15 Southern Illinois ===
No. 15 Southern Illinois Salukis (6–3) vs. No. 21 Youngstown State Penguins (5–4) – Game summary

Quarter	1	2	3	4	Total
No. 15 Salukis	17	7	0	14	38
No. 21 Penguins	7	7	21	13	48

at Stambaugh Stadium, Youngstown, OH

- Date: November 8
- Game time: 2:00 p.m.
- Game weather: Cloudy • Temperature: 53 °F (12 °C) • Wind: N at 5 miles per hour (8.0 km/h)
- Game attendance: 8,448
- Referee: David Hergert
- TV announcers (ESPN+): Drae Smith (play-by-play) and Chris Sammarone (analyst)
- Box score, Recap

Game information
First quarter
- (14:08) SIU – Eddie Robinson 12-yard pass from DJ Williams, Paul Geelen kick (Drive: 2 plays, 70 yards, 0:52; SIU 7–0)
- (11:09) YSU – Kylon Wilson 12-yard pass from Beau Brungard, Andrew Lastovka kick (Drive: 6 plays, 80 yards, 2:54; Tied 7–7)
- (9:03) SIU – Paul Geelen 36-yard field goal (Drive: 4 plays, -1 yard, 0:52; SIU 10–7)
- (4:08) SIU – DJ Williams 1-yard run, Geelen Paul kick (Drive: 6 plays, 69 yards, 2:45; SIU 17–7)

Second quarter

- (10:47) SIU – Vinson Davis III 23-yard pass from DJ Williams, Paul Geelen kick (Drive: 9 plays, 85 yards, 3:32; SIU 24–7)
- (8:05) YSU – Beau Brungard 5-yard run, Andrew Lastovka kick (Drive: 6 plays, 75 yards, 2:42; SIU 24–14)

Third quarter

- (11:41) YSU – Kylon Wilson 17-yard pass from Beau Brungard, Andrew Lastovka kick (Drive: 6 plays, 69 yards, 3:12; SIU 24–21)
- (7:56) YSU – Ethan Wright 19-yard pass from Beau Brungard, Andrew Lastovka kick (Drive: 5 plays, 90 yards, 2:01; YSU 28–24)
- (3:02) YSU – Jaden Gilbert 40-yard run, Andrew Lastovka kick (Drive: 8 plays, 91 yards, 3:36; YSU 35–24)

Fourth quarter

- (12:36) SIU – Miles Marshall 2-yard pass from DJ Williams, DJ Williams conversion pass failed (Drive: 14 plays, 75 yards, 5:26; YSU 35–30)
- (10:25) YSU – Beau Brungard 17-yard run, Andrew Lastovka kick (Drive: 5 plays, 75 yards, 2:11; YSU 42–30)
- (1:51) YSU – Jaden Gilbert 13-yard pass from Beau Brungard, Andrew Lastovka kick failed (Drive: 11 plays, 58 yards, 6:09; YSU 48–30)
- (0:35) SIU – Lem Wash 3-yard run, DJ Williams pass to Ryan Schwendeman for two-point conversion (Drive: 8 plays, 68 yards, 1:11; YSU 48–38)

Statistics	SIU	YSU
First downs	25	29
Total yards	537	648
Rushing yards	176	303
Passing yards	361	345
Passing: Comp–Att–Int	23–42–0	26–35–0
Time of possession	25:17	34:43

Team	Category	Player	Statistics
Southern Illinois	Passing	DJ Williams	23/42, 361 yards, 3 TD
Southern Illinois	Rushing	Edward Robinson	11 carries, 85 yards
Southern Illinois	Receiving	Ryan Schwendeman	5 receptions, 96 yards
Youngstown State	Passing	Beau Brungard	26/35, 345 yards, 4 TD
Youngstown State	Rushing	Jaden Gilbert	9 carries, 149 yards, TD
Youngstown State	Receiving	Luke Hensley	4 receptions, 70 yards

=== Indiana State ===
Indiana State Sycamores (3–7) vs. No. 20 Youngstown State Penguins (6–4) – Game summary

Quarter	1	2	3	4	Total
Sycamores	6	20	0	3	29
No. 20 Penguins	14	17	7	10	48

at Stambaugh Stadium, Youngstown, OH

- Date: November 15
- Game time: 12:00 p.m.
- Game weather: Cloudy • Temperature: 55 °F (13 °C) • Wind: SW at 57 miles per hour (92 km/h)
- Game attendance: 7,392
- Referee: Jason Berg
- TV: ESPN+
- Box score, Recap

Game information
First quarter
- (3:59) YSU – Beau Brungard 8-yard run, Andrew Lastovka kick (Drive: 1 play, 8 yards, 0:06; YSU 7–0)
- (2:10) INST – Rashad Rochelle 11-yard pass from Keegan Patterson, Sebastian Lopez kick failed (Drive: 4 plays, 75 yards, 1:49; YSU 7–6)
- (0:27) YSU – Beau Brungard 1-yard run, Andrew Lastovka kick (Drive: 10 plays, 75 yards, 4:22; YSU 14–6)

Second quarter

- (11:05) INST – Nick Osho 2-yard run, Keegan Patterson pass failed (Drive: 10 plays, 75 yards, 4:22; YSU 14–12)
- (7:32) YSU – Beau Brungard 1-yard run, Andrew Lastovka kick (Drive: 6 plays, 54 yards, 3:20; YSU 21–12)
- (6:46) INST – Rashad Rochelle 78-yard pass from Keegan Patterson, Sebastian Lopez kick (Drive: 2 plays, 79 yards, 0:37; YSU 21–19)
- (3:54) YSU – Kylon Wilson 20-yard pass from Beau Brungard, Andrew Lastovka kick (Drive: 6 plays, 75 yards, 2:52; YSU 28–19)
- (3:01) INST – Rashad Rochelle 74-yard pass from Keegan Patterson, Sebastial Lopez kick (Drive: 2 plays, 72 yards, 0:47; YSU 28–26)
- (0:14) YSU – Andrew Lastovka 39-yard field goal (Drive: 7 plays, 6 yards, 1:03; YSU 31–26)

Third quarter

- (9:08) YSU – Austin Bray 2-yard pass from Beau Brungard, Andrew Lastovka kick (Drive: 8 plays, 79 yards, 3:56; YSU 38–26)

Fourth quarter

- (12:55) YSU – Austin Bray 5-yard pass from Beau Brungard, Andrew Lastovka kick (Drive: 8 plays, 79 yards, 3:48; YSU 45–26)
- (7:13) INST – Sebastian Lopez 38-yard field goal (Drive: 13 plays, 55 yards, 5:42; YSU 45–29)
- (2:58) YSU – Andrew Lastovka 42-yard field goal (Drive: 8 plays, 27 yards, 4:14; YSU 48–29)

Statistics	INST	YSU
First downs	19	25
Total yards	492	482
Rushing yards	173	218
Passing yards	319	264
Passing: Comp–Att–Int	15–24–1	23–30–0
Time of possession	25:16	34:44

Team	Category	Player	Statistics
Indiana State	Passing	Keegan Patterson	15/24, 319 yards, 3 TD, INT
Indiana State	Rushing	Nick Osho	15 carries, 102 yards, TD
Indiana State	Receiving	Rashad Rochelle	6 receptions, 224 yards, 3 TD
Youngstown State	Passing	Beau Brungard	23/30, 264 yards, 3 TD
Youngstown State	Rushing	Jaden Gilbert	9 carries, 91 yards
Youngstown State	Receiving	Max Tomczak	7 receptions, 109 yards

=== at Northern Iowa ===
No. 18 Youngstown State Penguins (7–4) vs. Northern Iowa Panthers (3–8) – Game summary

Quarter	1	2	3	4	Total
No. 18 Penguins	14	14	7	0	35
Panthers	3	0	15	14	32

at UNI-Dome, Cedar Falls, IA

- Date: November 22
- Game time: 2:00 p.m.
- Game weather: Indoors; 72 °F (22 °C)
- Game attendance: 7,361
- Referee: Jason Perkins
- TV announcers (ESPN+): Mark Simpson (play-by-play) and Justin Surrency (analyst)
- Box score, Recap

Game information
First quarter
- (11:29) YSU – Beau Brungard 7-yard run, Andrew Lastovka kick (Drive: 6 plays, 52 yards, 3:20; YSU 7–0)
- (4:37) YSU – Beau Brungard 29-yard run, Andrew Lastovka kick (Drive: 5 plays, 91 yards, 3:09; YSU 14–0)
- (0:49) UNI – Max Bartachek 40-yard field goal (Drive: 9 plays, 53 yards, 3:48; YSU 14–3)

Second quarter

- (10:27) YSU – Alex McDonald 12-yard pass from Beau Brungard, Andrew Lastovka kick (Drive: 1 plays, 71 yards, 5:22; YSU 21–3)
- (0:51) YSU – Beau Brungard 7-yard run, Andrew Lastovka kick (Drive: 7 plays, 50 yards, 3:18; YSU 28–3)

Third quarter

- (13:01) UNI – JC Roque Jr. 6-yard pass from Jaxon Dailey, Max Bartachek kick (Drive: 6 plays, 75 yards, 1:59; YSU 28–10)
- (5:15) UNI – Harrison Bey-Buie 1-yard run, Jaxon Dailey pass to JC Roque Jr. for two-point conversion (Drive: 11 plays, 87 yards, 6:01; YSU 28–18)
- (3:27) YSU – Ethan Wright 3-yard pass from Beau Brungard, Andrew Lastovka kick (Drive: 5 plays, 75 yards, 1:48; YSU 35–18)

Fourth quarter

- (13:20) UNI – Harrison Bey-Buie 2-yard run, Max Bartachek kick (Drive: 10 plays, 75 yards, 5:07; YSU 35–25)
- (6:31) UNI – JC Roque Jr. 34-yard pass from Jaxon Dailey, Max Bartachek kick (Drive: 4 plays, 57 yards, 2:20; YSU 35–32)

Statistics	YSU	UNI
First downs	19	18
Total yards	417	483
Rushing yards	191	131
Passing yards	226	352
Passing: Comp–Att–Int	20–25–0	25–34–0
Time of possession	30:14	29:46

Team	Category	Player	Statistics
Youngstown State	Passing	Beau Brungard	20/25, 226 yards, 2 TD
Youngstown State	Rushing	Beau Brungard	22 carries, 143 yards, 3 TD
Youngstown State	Receiving	Max Tomczak	5 receptions, 82 yards
Northern Iowa	Passing	Jaxon Dailey	25/34, 352 yards, 2 TD
Northern Iowa	Rushing	Jaxon Dailey	8 carries, 52 yards
Northern Iowa	Receiving	Bill Jackson	7 receptions, 115 yards

=== No. 24 Yale (NCAA Division I Playoffs – First round) ===
2025 NCAA Division I FCS Playoffs First Round
No. 24 Yale Bulldogs (8–2) vs. No. 14 Youngstown State Penguins (8–4) – Game summary

Quarter	1	2	3	4	Total
No. 24 Bulldogs	0	7	15	21	43
No. 14 Penguins	14	21	7	0	42

at Stambaugh Stadium, Youngstown, OH

- Date: November 29
- Game time: 12:00 p.m.
- Game weather: Cloudy • Temperature: 33 °F (1 °C) • Wind: SW at 5 miles per hour (8.0 km/h)
- Game attendance: 4,869
- Referee: Charles Green
- TV announcers (ESPN+): Anthony Lima (play by play) and Marcus Ray (analyst)
- Box score, Recap

Game information
First quarter
- (11:35) YSU – Max Tomczak 23-yard pass from Beau Brungard, Andrew Lastovka kick (Drive: 8 plays, 79 yards, 3:20; YSU 7–0)
- (6:17) Beau Brungard 6-yard run, Andrew Lastovka kick (Drive: 6 plays, 55 yards, 2:58; YSU 14–0)

Second quarter

- (10:40) YSU – Max Tomczak 6-yard pass from Beau Brungard, Andrew Lastovka kick (Drive: 3 plays, 19 yards, 1:45; YSU 21–0)
- (7:38) YALE – Josh Pitsenberger 4-yard run, Noah Piper kick (Drive: 7 plays, 66 yards, 2:55; YSU 21–7)
- (6:10) YSU – Beau Brungard 1-yard run, Andrew Lastovka kick (Drive: 4 plays, 75 yards, 1:28; YSU 28–7)
- (0:16) YSU – Beau Brungard 6-yard run, Andrew Lastovka kick (Drive: 5 plays, 35 yards, 0:56; YSU 35–7)

Third quarter

- (9:21) YALE – Spencer Mermans 4-yard pass from Dante Reno, Noah Piper kick (Drive: 13 plays, 75 yards, 5:39; YSU 35–14)
- (7:37) YSU – Max Tomczak 7-yard pass from Beau Brungard, Andrew Lastovka kick (Drive: 3 plays, 75 yards, 1:44; YSU 42–14)
- (2:41) YALE – Josh Pitsenberger 1-yard run, Dante Reno pass to Graham Smith for two-point conversion (Drive: 11 plays, 77 yards, 4:52; YSU 42–22)

Fourth quarter

- (14:54) YALE – Lucius Anderson 11-yard pass from Dante Reno, Noah Piper kick (Drive: 7 plays, 37 yards, 2:38; YSU 42–29)
- (5:19) YALE – Graham Smith 4-yard pass from Dante Reno, Noah Piper kick (Drive: 12 plays, 72 yards, 4:36; YSU 42–36)
- (2:47) YALE – Josh Pitsenberger 56-yard run, Noah Piper kick (Drive: 1 play, 56 yards, 0:10; YALE 43–42)

Statistics	YALE	YSU
First downs	26	21
Total yards	453	491
Rushing yards	193	174
Passing yards	260	317
Passing: Comp–Att–Int	21–39–2	23–35–0
Time of possession	34:02	25:58

Team	Category	Player	Statistics
Yale	Passing	Dante Reno	21/38, 260 yards, 3 TD, 2 INT
Yale	Rushing	Josh Pitsenberger	32 carries, 209 yards, 3 TD
Yale	Receiving	Lucius Anderson	8 receptions, 138 yards, TD
Youngstown State	Passing	Beau Brungard	23/35, 317 yards, 3 TD
Youngstown State	Rushing	Beau Brungard	17 carries, 90 yards, 3 TD
Youngstown State	Receiving	Max Tomczak	6 receptions, 105 yards, 3 TD

== Rankings ==
Ranking movements Legend: ██ Increase in ranking ██ Decrease in ranking RV = Received votes
	Week														
Poll	Pre	1	2	3	4	5	6	7	8	9	10	11	12	13	Final
STATS FCS	RV	RV	RV	RV	24	24	RV	RV	22	18	21	20	18	14	18
Coaches	RV	RV	25	24	19	18	20	25	21	19	22	19	17	13	17
