= 2026 Northwestern Wildcats football team =

American college football season

2026 Northwestern Wildcats football
- Conference: Big Ten Conference
- Record: 6–5 (3–5 Big Ten)
- Head coach: David Braun (4th season)
- Offensive coordinator: Chip Kelly (1st season)
- Offensive scheme: Multiple spread
- Defensive coordinator: Tim McGarigle (3rd season)
- Base defense: Multiple 4–3
- Home stadium: Martin Stadium; Ryan Field

Uniform

2026 Big Ten Conference football standings
	Conf.			Overall
Team	W		L	W		L
No. 4 UCLA	7	–	1	10	–	1
No. 8 Indiana	6	–	1	9	–	1
No. 13 Oregon	6	–	2	8	–	3
No. 15 Iowa	5	–	2	8	–	2
No. 14 Ohio State	5	–	3	7	–	4
Wisconsin	5	–	3	7	–	4
No. 18 USC	4	–	3	7	–	3
Illinois	4	–	3	6	–	4
Nebraska	4	–	4	7	–	4
Minnesota	4	–	4	6	–	5
Penn State	3	–	4	6	–	4
Washington	3	–	4	6	–	4
Michigan	3	–	5	6	–	5
Northwestern	3	–	5	6	–	5
Maryland	2	–	5	4	–	6
Purdue	2	–	6	3	–	8
Rutgers	1	–	6	2	–	8
Michigan State	1	–	7	3	–	8
Championship: December 5, 2026
^ – College Football Playoff participant; $ – Conference champion; y – Championship game participant; As of November 22, 2026; Rankings from CFP rankings

The 2026 Northwestern Wildcats football team will represent Northwestern University as a member of the Big Ten Conference during the 2026 NCAA Division I FBS football season. They are led by fourth-year head coach David Braun. The team played its first two home games at a temporary facility constructed at the university's Martin Stadium, while playing their final five home games at Ryan Field after construction finished, debuting on October 2.

== Schedule ==
Date	Time	Opponent	Rank	Site	TV	Result	Attendance
September 5	7:00 p.m.	No. 2 (FCS) South Dakota State*		Martin Stadium; Evanston, IL	BTN	W 34–18	9,574
September 19	6:30 p.m.	Colorado*		Martin Stadium; Evanston, IL	FOX	W 41–7	12,023
September 25	7:00 p.m.	at No. 5 Indiana		Memorial Stadium; Bloomington, IN	FOX	L 23–29	54,593
October 2	7:00 p.m.	Penn State		Ryan Field; Evanston, IL	FOX	W 34–13	35,000
October 10	11:30 a.m.	Ball State*^{†}		Ryan Field; Evanston, IL	BTN	W 45–14	25,629
October 17	11:00 a.m.	at Michigan State	No. 25	Spartan Stadium; East Lansing, MI	NBCSN/Peacock	W 24–21	67,423
October 24	11:00 a.m.	Rutgers	No. 24	Ryan Field; Evanston, IL	Peacock	W 42–14	27,156
October 31	2:30 p.m.	at Oregon	No. 20т	Autzen Stadium; Eugene, OR	NBCSN/Peacock	L 26–34	55,673
November 7	6:30 p.m.	No. 19 Iowa		Ryan Field; Evanston, IL	FOX	L 10–24	31,151
November 14	11:00 a.m.	at No. 20 Ohio State		Ohio Stadium; Columbus, OH	FOX	L 19–28	101,256
November 21	11:00 a.m.	at Minnesota		Huntington Bank Stadium; Minneapolis, MN	FS1	L 17–20	39,371
November 28	11:30 a.m.	Illinois		Ryan Field; Evanston, IL (rivalry)	BTN		
*Non-conference game; ^{†}Homecoming; Rankings from AP Poll (and CFP Rankings, after November 3) – Released prior to game; All times are in Central time; Source:

== Rankings ==
Ranking movements Legend: ██ Increase in ranking ██ Decrease in ranking — = Not ranked RV = Received votes
	Week																
Poll	Pre	1	2	3	4	5	6	7	8	9	10	11	12	13	14	15	Final
AP	—	—	—	—	RV	RV	25	24	20	RV	—	—					
Coaches	—	—	—	RV	RV	RV	RV	23	18	23	RV	RV					
CFP	Not released									—	—	—					Not released

== Game summaries ==
=== vs. No. 2 (FCS) South Dakota State ===
No. 2 (FCS) South Dakota State Jackrabbits (1–0) at Northwestern Wildcats (0–0) – Game summary

Quarter	1	2	3	4	Total
No. 2 (FCS) Jackrabbits	0	6	6	6	18
Wildcats	7	3	7	17	34

at Martin Stadium • Evanston, Illinois

- Date: September 5
- Game time: 7:00 p.m. CST
- Game weather: Cloudy • Temperature: 73 °F (23 °C) • Wind: NE at 14 miles per hour (23 km/h)
- Game attendance: 9,574
- Referee: Tim O'Dey
- TV announcers (BTN): Lisa Byington, Tanner Morgan and Natalie Kerwin

Game information

First quarter

- NU – Alex Honig 11-yard pass from Aidan Chiles (Jackson Kleather kick), 11:42. Wildcats 7–0. Drive: 2 plays, 82 yards, 0:44.

Second quarter

- SDST – Tristan Alvano 21-yard field goal, 10:50. Wildcats 7–3. Drive: 12 plays, 77 yards, 6:12.
- NU – Jackson Kleather 36-yard field goal, 6:32. Wildcats 10–3. Drive: 9 plays, 56 yards, 4:18.
- SDST – Tristan Alvano 33-yard field goal, 1:16. Wildcats 10–6. Drive: 7 plays, 36 yards, 2:32.

Third quarter

- SDST – Tristan Alvano 27-yard field goal, 9:56. Wildcats 10–9. Drive: 7 plays, 17 yards, 3:23.
- NU – Caleb Komolafe 7-yard run (Jackson Kleather kick), 7:13. Wildcats 17–9. Drive: 6 plays, 75 yards, 2:43.
- SDST – Tristan Alvano 26-yard field goal, 2:16. Wildcats 17–12. Drive: 13 plays, 69 yards, 4:51.

Fourth quarter

- NU – Jackson Kleather 38-yard field goal, 13:32. Wildcats 20–12. Drive: 8 plays, 55 yards, 3:44.
- SDST – Josiah Johnson 2-yard run (pass failed), 8:16. Wildcats 20–18. Drive: 9 plays, 75 yards, 5:16.
- NU – Aidan Chiles 14-yard run (Jackson Kleather kick), 4:34. Wildcats 27–18. Drive: 9 plays, 71 yards, 3:37.
- NU – Joseph Himon II 80-yard run (Jackson Kleather kick), 1:15. Wildcats 34–18. Drive: 1 play, 80 yards, 0:12.

Statistics	SDST	NU
First downs	27	19
Plays–yards	88–432	55–497
Rushes–yards	40–147	31–224
Passing yards	285	273
Passing: comp–att–int	23–48–1	14–24–0
Turnovers	1	0
Time of possession	34:08	25:52

Team	Category	Player	Statistics
South Dakota State	Passing	Chase Mason	23/48, 285 yards, INT
South Dakota State	Rushing	Josiah Johnson	19 carries, 79 yards, TD
South Dakota State	Receiving	Grahm Goering	9 receptions, 117 yards
Northwestern	Passing	Aidan Chiles	14/24, 273 yards, TD
Northwestern	Rushing	Joseph Himon II	4 carries, 87 yards, TD
Northwestern	Receiving	Griffin Wilde	3 receptions, 104 yards

=== vs. Colorado ===
Colorado Buffaloes (2–0) at Northwestern Wildcats (1–0) – Game summary

Quarter	1	2	3	4	Total
Buffaloes	0	0	7	0	7
Wildcats	7	14	14	6	41

at Martin Stadium • Evanston, Illinois

- Date: September 19
- Game time: 6:30 p.m. CST
- Game weather: Cloudy • Temperature: 69 °F (21 °C)
- Game attendance: 12,023
- Referee: Henry Johns
- TV announcers (FOX): Noah Reed (play-by-play), Devin Gardner (analyst) and Josh Sims (sideline)

Game information

First quarter

- (0:43) NWEST – Aidan Chiles 1-yard run, Jackson Kleather kick (Drive: 7 plays, 44 yards, 4:15; Northwestern 7–0)

Second quarter

- (7:59) NWEST – Joseph Himon II 18-yard pass from Aidan Chiles, Jackson Kleather kick (Drive: 2 plays, 18 yards, 0:37; Northwestern 14–0)
- (0:59) NWEST – Aidan Chiles 3-yard run, Jackson Kleather kick (Drive: 11 plays, 72 yards, 4:19; Northwestern 21–0)

Third quarter

- (10:24) COLO – Joseph Williams 50-yard pass from Julian Lewis, Elliot Arnold kick (Drive: 4 plays, 66 yards, 1:26; Northwestern 21–7)
- (6:27) NWEST – Joseph Himon II 25-yard pass from Aidan Chiles, Jackson Kleather kick (Drive: 8 plays, 60 yards, 3:52; Northwestern 28–7)
- (3:15) NWEST – Joseph Himon II 3-yard pass from Aidan Chiles, Jackson Kleather kick (Drive: 4 plays, 47 yards, 1:16; Northwestern 35–7)

Fourth quarter

- (13:09) NWEST – Jackson Kleather 36-yard field goal (Drive: 9 plays, 61 yards, 3:07; Northwestern 38–7)
- (3:06) NWEST – Jackson Kleather 21-yard field goal (Drive: 11 plays, 66 yards, 7:13; Northwestern 41–7)

Statistics	COLO	NU
First downs	18	21
Plays–yards	62–348	73–423
Rushes–yards	33–180	51–182
Passing yards	168	241
Passing: comp–att–int	19–29–2	17–22–0
Turnovers	4	1
Time of possession	23:07	36:53

Team	Category	Player	Statistics
Colorado	Passing	Julian Lewis	19/29, 158 yards, TD, 2 INT
Colorado	Rushing	JaQuail Smith	8 carries, 91 yards
Colorado	Receiving	DeAndre Moore Jr.	7 receptions, 56 yards
Northwestern	Passing	Aidan Chiles	17/22, 241 yards, 3 TD
Northwestern	Rushing	Caleb Komolafe	11 carries, 49 yards
Northwestern	Receiving	Griffin Wilde	5 receptions, 85 yards

=== at No. 5 Indiana ===
Northwestern Wildcats (2–0) at No. 5 Indiana Hoosiers (3–0) – Game summary

Quarter	1	2	3	4	Total
Wildcats	0	0	7	16	23
No. 5 Hoosiers	2	10	3	14	29

at Memorial Stadium • Bloomington, Indiana

- Date: September 25
- Game time: 7:00 p.m. CST
- Game weather: Cloudy • Temperature: 67 °F (19 °C) • Wind: NE 5 mph
- Game attendance: 54,593
- Referee: Jason Nickleby
- TV announcers (FOX): Connor Onion (play-by-play), Robert Griffin III (analyst), and Alexa Landestoy (sideline)
- Box score and Recap

Game information
First quarter
- IU – Aidan Chiles tackled in own end zone by Daniel Ndukwe, 7:20. Hoosiers 2–0.

Second quarter

- IU – Nico Radicic 43-yard field goal, 13:06. Hoosiers 5–0. Drive: 9 plays, 51 yards, 4:42.
- IU – Nick Marsh 8-yard pass from Josh Hoover (Nico Radicic kick), 5:04. Hoosiers 12–0. Drive: 7 plays, 90 yards, 3:59.

Third quarter

- NU – Griffin Wilde 4-yard pass from Aidan Chiles (Jackson Kleather kick), 6:34. Hoosiers 12–7. Drive: 10 plays, 75 yards, 4:55.
- IU – Nico Radicic 22-yard field goal, 2:06. Hoosiers 15–7. Drive: 10 plays, 90 yards, 4:28.

Fourth quarter

- NU – Griffin Wilde 8-yard pass from Aidan Chiles (run failed), 14:54. Hoosiers 15–13. Drive: 6 plays, 75 yards, 2:12.
- IU – Lee Beebe 4-yard run (Nico Radicic kick), 9:39. Hoosiers 22–13. Drive: 10 plays, 75 yards, 5:15.
- NU – Aidan Chiles 7-yard run (Jackson Kleather kick), 5:10. Hoosiers 22–20. Drive: 9 plays, 78 yards, 4:25.
- IU – Josh Hoover 1-yard run (Nico Radicic kick), 1:56. Hoosiers 29–20. Drive: 6 plays, 75 yards, 3:14.
- NU – Jackson Kleather 42-yard field goal, 0:58. Hoosiers 29–23. Drive: 8 plays, 51 yards, 0:58.

Statistics	NU	IU
First downs	21	24
Plays–yards	57–325	69–472
Rushes–yards	27–32	40–271
Passing yards	293	201
Passing: comp–att–int	22–30–0	19–29–0
Turnovers	0	0
Time of possession	25:13	34:47

Team	Category	Player	Statistics
Northwestern	Passing	Aidan Chiles	22/29, 293 yards, 2 TD
Northwestern	Rushing	Aidan Chiles	13 carries, 43 yards, TD
Northwestern	Receiving	Luke Dehnicke	7 receptions, 140 yards
Indiana	Passing	Josh Hoover	19/29, 201 yards, TD
Indiana	Rushing	Lee Beebe	24 carries, 203 yards, TD
Indiana	Receiving	Charlie Becker	7 receptions, 98 yards

=== vs. Penn State ===
Penn State Nittany Lions (3–1) at Northwestern Wildcats (2–1) – Game summary

Quarter	1	2	3	4	Total
Nittany Lions	0	7	0	6	13
Wildcats	10	14	7	3	34

at Ryan Field • Evanston, Illinois

- Date: October 2
- Game time: 7:00 p.m. CST
- Game weather: 57 °F (14 °C) • clear
- Game attendance: 35,000
- Referee: Gregory Blum
- TV announcers (FOX): Connor Onion (play-by-play), Robert Griffin III (analyst), and Alexa Landestoy (sideline)
- Box score and Recap

Game information

First quarter

- NU – Jackson Kleather, 50-yard field goal, 10:09 (3–0 NU)
- NU – Aidan Chiles, 2-yard TD run, Kleather kick, 5:07 (10–0 NU)

Second quarter

- PSU – Carson Hansen, 8-yard TD run, Ryan Barker kick, 10:39 (10–7 NU)
- NU – Joseph Himon II, 35-yard TD run, Kleather kick, 9:21 (17–7 NU)
- NU – Himon, 11-yard TD run, Kleather kick, 1:55 (24–7 NU)

Third quarter

- NU – Caleb Komolafe, 1-yard TD rush, Kleather kick, 1:13 (31–7 NU)

Fourth quarter

- PSU – Chase Sowell, 16-yard TD pass from Rocco Becht, 2-point conversion pass incomplete, 7:53 (31–13 NU)
- NU – Kleather, 37-yard field goal, 2:17 (34–13 NU)

Statistics	PSU	NU
First downs	20	25
Plays–yards	63–291	69–506
Rushes–yards	22–48	55–413
Passing yards	243	93
Passing: comp–att–int	26–41–2	10–14–0
Turnovers	2	1
Time of possession	23:55	36:05

Team	Category	Player	Statistics
Penn State	Passing	Rocco Becht	26/41, 243 yards, TD, 2 INT
Penn State	Rushing	Carson Hansen	4 carries, 19 yards, TD
Penn State	Receiving	Chase Sowell	5 receptions, 68 yards, TD
Northwestern	Passing	Aidan Chiles	10/14, 93 yards
Northwestern	Rushing	Caleb Komolafe	25 carries, 188 yards, TD
Northwestern	Receiving	Griffin Wilde	2 receptions, 36 yards

=== vs. Ball State ===
Ball State Cardinals (1–4) at Northwestern Wildcats (3–1) – Game summary

Quarter	1	2	3	4	Total
Cardinals	0	14	0	0	14
Wildcats	14	17	14	0	45

at Ryan Field • Evanston, Illinois

- Date: October 10
- Game time: 11:30 a.m. CST
- Game weather: Sunny • Temperature: 76 °F (24 °C) • Wind: S 13 mph
- Game attendance: 25,629
- Referee: Bryan Banks
- TV announcers (BTN): Chris Vosters (play-by-play), Anthony Herron (analyst), and Dannie Rogers (sideline)

Statistics	BALL	NU
First downs	22	26
Plays–yards	78–360	55–436
Rushes–yards	31–90	31–164
Passing yards	270	272
Passing: comp–att–int	32–47–1	17–24–0
Turnovers	1	0
Time of possession	33:59	26:01

Team	Category	Player	Statistics
Ball State	Passing	Keldric Luster	27/41, 209 yards, TD, INT
Ball State	Rushing	Johnny Thompson Jr. Ace Cooper	7 carries, 15 yards 2 carries, 15 yards
Ball State	Receiving	Jabari Smith	7 receptions, 64 yards
Northwestern	Passing	Aidan Chiles	17/23, 272 yards, 3 TD
Northwestern	Rushing	Caleb Komolafe	8 carries, 44 yards, TD
Northwestern	Receiving	Griffin Wilde	8 receptions, 144 yards, TD

=== at Michigan State ===
No. 25 Northwestern Wildcats (4–1) at Michigan State Spartans (2–4) – Game summary

Quarter	1	2	3	4	Total
No. 25 Wildcats	3	7	3	11	24
Spartans	7	7	0	7	21

at Spartan Stadium • East Lansing, Michigan

- Date: October 17
- Game time: 11:00 a.m. CST
- Game weather: Sunny • Temperature: 46 °F (8 °C) • Wind: NW at 6 miles per hour (9.7 km/h)
- Game attendance: 67,423
- Referee: Jim Wharrie
- TV announcers (Peacock/NBCSN): Paul Burmeister (play-by-play), Yogi Roth (analyst), and Caroline Pineda (sideline)
- Box score and Recap

Game information

First quarter

- NU – Jackson Kleather 39-yard field goal, 8:23. Wildcats 3–0. Drive: 4 plays, -10 yards, 2:12.
- MSU – Alessio Milivojevic 3-yard run (Liam Boyd kick), 2:02. Spartans 7–3. Drive: 12 plays, 49 yards, 6:10.

Second quarter

- NU – Caleb Komolafe 10-yard run (Jackson Kleather kick), 11:04. Wildcats 10–7. Drive: 12 plays, 75 yards, 5:58.
- MSU – Bryson Williams 32-yard pass from Alessio Milivojevic (Liam Boyd kick), 0:47. Spartans 14–10. Drive: 9 plays, 77 yards, 2:01.

Third quarter

- NU – Jackson Kleather 37-yard field goal, 4:24. Spartans 14–13. Drive: 14 plays, 61 yards, 7:32.

Fourth quarter

- MSU – Chrishon McCray 53-yard pass from Alessio Milivojevic (Liam Boyd kick), 11:48. Spartans 21–13. Drive: 2 plays, 57 yards, 1:00.
- NU – Aidan Chiles 1-yard run (Aidan Chiles–Alex Honig pass), 7:24. Tied 21–21. Drive: 9 plays, 77 yards, 4:18.
- NU – Jackson Kleather 34-yard field goal, 0:02. Wildcats 24–21. Drive: 8 plays, 64 yards, 0:58.

Statistics	NU	MSU
First downs	23	15
Plays–yards	71–360	57–305
Rushes–yards	42–134	27–89
Passing yards	226	216
Passing: comp–att–int	18–28–0	19–30–0
Turnovers	0	1
Time of possession	34:55	25:05

Team	Category	Player	Statistics
Northwestern	Passing	Aidan Chiles	18/27, 226 yards
Northwestern	Rushing	Caleb Komolafe	15 carries, 67 yards, TD
Northwestern	Receiving	Griffin Wilde	6 receptions, 57 yards
Michigan State	Passing	Alessio Milivojevic	19/30, 216 yards, 2 TD
Michigan State	Rushing	Jaziun Patterson	15 carries, 72 yards
Michigan State	Receiving	Chrishon McCray	3 receptions, 64 yards, TD

=== vs. Rutgers ===
Rutgers Scarlet Knights (2–4) at No. 24 Northwestern Wildcats (5–1) – Game summary

Quarter	1	2	3	4	Total
Scarlet Knights	3	3	8	0	14
No. 24 Wildcats	21	7	0	14	42

at Ryan Field • Evanston, Illinois

- Date: October 24
- TV announcers (Peacock): Paul Burmeister (play-by-play), Yogi Roth (analyst), and Caroline Pineda (sideline)

Statistics	RUTG	NU
First downs		
Plays–yards		
Rushes–yards		
Passing yards		
Passing: comp–att–int		
Time of possession		

Team	Category	Player	Statistics
Rutgers	Passing		
Rutgers	Rushing		
Rutgers	Receiving		
Northwestern	Passing		
Northwestern	Rushing		
Northwestern	Receiving		

=== at Oregon ===
No. 20т Northwestern Wildcats (6–1) at Oregon Ducks (4–3) – Game summary

Quarter	1	2	3	4	Total
No. 20т Wildcats	10	10	3	3	26
Ducks	3	10	7	14	34

at Autzen Stadium • Eugene, Oregon

- Date: October 31
- TV announcers (Peacock/NBCSN): Paul Burmeister (play-by-play), Yogi Roth (analyst), and Caroline Pineda (sideline)

Statistics	NU	ORE
First downs		
Plays–yards		
Rushes–yards		
Passing yards		
Passing: comp–att–int		
Time of possession		

Team	Category	Player	Statistics
Northwestern	Passing		
Northwestern	Rushing		
Northwestern	Receiving		
Oregon	Passing		
Oregon	Rushing		
Oregon	Receiving		

=== vs. No. 19 Iowa ===
No. 19 Iowa Hawkeyes (6–2) at Northwestern Wildcats (6–2) – Game summary

Quarter	1	2	3	4	Total
No. 19 Hawkeyes	7	7	10	0	24
Wildcats	0	0	3	7	10

at Ryan Field • Evanston, Illinois

- Date: November 7
- TV announcers (FOX): Connor Onion (play-by-play), Robert Griffin III (analyst), and Alexa Landestoy (sideline)

Statistics	IOWA	NU
First downs		
Plays–yards		
Rushes–yards		
Passing yards		
Passing: comp–att–int		
Time of possession		

Team	Category	Player	Statistics
Iowa	Passing		
Iowa	Rushing		
Iowa	Receiving		
Northwestern	Passing		
Northwestern	Rushing		
Northwestern	Receiving		

=== at No. 20 Ohio State ===
Northwestern Wildcats (6–3) at No. 20 Ohio State Buckeyes (6–3) – Game summary

Quarter	1	2	3	4	Total
Wildcats	3	3	7	6	19
No. 20 Buckeyes	0	14	7	7	28

at Ohio Stadium • Columbus, Ohio

- Date: November 14
- TV announcers (FOX): Connor Onion (play-by-play), Robert Griffin III (analyst), and Alexa Landestoy (sideline)

Statistics	NU	OSU
First downs		
Plays–yards		
Rushes–yards		
Passing yards		
Passing: comp–att–int		
Time of possession		

Team	Category	Player	Statistics
Northwestern	Passing		
Northwestern	Rushing		
Northwestern	Receiving		
Ohio State	Passing		
Ohio State	Rushing		
Ohio State	Receiving		

=== at Minnesota ===
Northwestern Wildcats (6–4) at Minnesota Golden Gophers (5–5) – Game summary

Quarter	1	2	3	4	Total
Wildcats	0	0	0	0	0
Golden Gophers	0	0	0	0	0

at Huntington Bank Stadium • Minneapolis, Minnesota

- Date: November 21

Statistics	NU	MINN
First downs		
Plays–yards		
Rushes–yards		
Passing yards		
Passing: comp–att–int		
Time of possession		

Team	Category	Player	Statistics
Northwestern	Passing		
Northwestern	Rushing		
Northwestern	Receiving		
Minnesota	Passing		
Minnesota	Rushing		
Minnesota	Receiving		

=== vs. Illinois ===
Illinois Fighting Illini (0–0) at Northwestern Wildcats (0–0) – Game summary

Quarter	1	2	3	4	Total
Fighting Illini	0	0	0	0	0
Wildcats	0	0	0	0	0

at Ryan Field • Evanston, Illinois

- Date: November 28

Statistics	ILL	NU
First downs		
Plays–yards		
Rushes–yards		
Passing yards		
Passing: comp–att–int		
Time of possession		

Team	Category	Player	Statistics
Illinois	Passing		
Illinois	Rushing		
Illinois	Receiving		
Northwestern	Passing		
Northwestern	Rushing		
Northwestern	Receiving		
