= Aidan Chiles =

American football player (born 2005)

No. 0 – Northwestern Wildcats
- Position: Quarterback
- Class: Senior

Personal information
- Born: September 12, 2005 (age 21); Long Beach, California, U.S.
- Listed height: 6 ft 4 in (1.93 m)
- Listed weight: 220 lb (100 kg)

Career information
- High school: Downey (Downey, California)
- College: Oregon State (2023); Michigan State (2024–2025); Northwestern (2026–present)
- Stats at ESPN

Aidan Chiles (born September 12, 2005) is an American college football quarterback who plays for the Northwestern Wildcats. He previously played for the Oregon State Beavers and Michigan State Spartans.

== Early life ==
Chiles attended Downey High School in Downey, California. As a senior, he passed for 3,350 yards and 38 touchdowns with five interceptions. He was selected to play in the 2023 All-American Bowl. Chiles committed to Oregon State University to play college football.

== College career ==
=== Oregon State ===
Chiles competed with DJ Uiagalelei and Ben Gulbranson for the starting position in his freshman season with the Beavers in 2023. Uiagalelei won the competition, with Chiles named the backup. Chiles made his collegiate debut in the 2023 season opener against San Jose State in a 42–17 victory. The following week against UC Davis, Chiles saw his most extensive action of the season, completing 9 of 13 passes for 74 yards and a touchdown while rushing for 42 yards and a touchdown in the win. He was utilized as a dual-threat quarterback, frequently entering the game in important situations and being deployed in designed formations to take advantage of his running ability. He appeared in nine games during the season, completing 24 of 35 passes for 309 yards and four touchdowns while adding three rushing touchdowns. Chiles entered the NCAA transfer portal on December 4, 2023, and opted out of the 2023 Sun Bowl.

=== Michigan State ===
On December 14, 2023, Chiles announced that he would transfer to Michigan State University, following his head coach Jonathan Smith. He was named the Spartans' starting quarterback over Tommy Schuster and Alessio Milivojevic. Chiles made his Michigan State debut in the 2024 season opener against Florida Atlantic. Although Michigan State entered the game as a heavy favorite, Chiles completed just 10 of 24 passes for 114 yards and two interceptions while adding a rushing touchdown in a 16–10 victory. He played much better the following week, completing 24 of 38 passes for a season-high 363 yards, three touchdowns, and two interceptions in a 27–24 victory over Maryland. Chiles threw a game-tying 77-yard touchdown pass to Nick Marsh late in the fourth quarter and led the Spartans down the field on their final possession, setting up a game-winning 37-yard field goal. Chiles led the Spartans to their third consecutive win in Week 3, throwing one touchdown pass and rushing for another in a 40–0 victory over Prairie View A&M. In Week 4 against Boston College, Chiles threw three interceptions in a narrow 23–19 loss, handing Michigan State its first loss of the season. Chiles and the Spartans struggled throughout the remainder of the season, winning just two more games and finishing 5–7. Chiles started all 12 games, completing 192 of 323 passes for 2,415 yards, 13 touchdowns, and 11 interceptions while adding 225 rushing yards and three touchdowns.

Chiles returned as the starting quarterback for the 2025 season. He completed 17 of 23 passes for 155 yards and a touchdown in the season-opening 23–6 victory over Western Michigan. The following week against Boston College, Chiles threw for 231 yards and four touchdowns while rushing for another in a 42–40 double-overtime victory. He threw the game-winning two-point conversion to Omari Kelly, avenging Michigan State's loss to Boston College the previous season. For his performance, Chiles was named the Big Ten Co-Offensive Player of the Week. In Week 3, Chiles led the Spartans to their third consecutive victory, a 41–24 win over Youngstown State, giving Michigan State three consecutive wins to begin the season for the second consecutive year. In Week 4 against No. 25 USC, Chiles completed 12 of 21 passes for 212 yards and three touchdowns while rushing for another in a 45–31 loss. The Spartans went on to lose four more games, with Chiles throwing just one touchdown during that stretch. After Michigan State fell to 3–5, Chiles was benched in favor of Milivojevic. He finished the season appearing in nine games with eight starts, completing 128 of 203 passes for 1,392 yards, 10 touchdowns, and three interceptions. He also rushed for 227 yards and a team-leading six touchdowns. Following the season, after Smith was fired, Chiles entered the transfer portal for the second time.

=== Northwestern ===
On January 6, 2026, Chiles announced that he would transfer to Northwestern University. Chiles was named the starting quarterback for the Wildcats ahead of the 2026 season after competing with Ryan Boe and transfer Nicco Marchiol.

=== College statistics ===
Year	Team	Games			Passing								Rushing			
Year	Team	GP	GS	Record	Cmp	Att	Pct	Yds	Y/A	TD	Int	Rtg	Att	Yds	Avg	TD
2023	Oregon State	9	0	—	24	35	68.6	309	8.8	4	0	180.4	17	79	4.6	3
2024	Michigan State	12	12	5–7	192	323	59.4	2,415	7.5	13	11	128.7	97	225	2.3	3
2025	Michigan State	9	8	3–5	128	203	63.1	1,392	6.9	10	3	134.0	81	227	2.8	6
2026	Northwestern	8	8	6−2	139	202	68.8	1,898	9.4	13	1	168.0	86	274	3.2	10
Career		38	28	14−14	483	763	63.3	6,014	7.9	40	15	142.9	281	805	2.9	22
