= 2025 Michigan State Spartans football team =

American college football season

2025 Michigan State Spartans football
- Conference: Big Ten Conference
- Record: 4–8 (1–8 Big Ten)
- Head coach: Jonathan Smith (2nd season)
- Offensive coordinator: Brian Lindgren (2nd season)
- Offensive scheme: Multiple
- Defensive coordinator: Joe Rossi (2nd season)
- Base defense: Multiple 4–2–5
- Home stadium: Spartan Stadium

Uniform
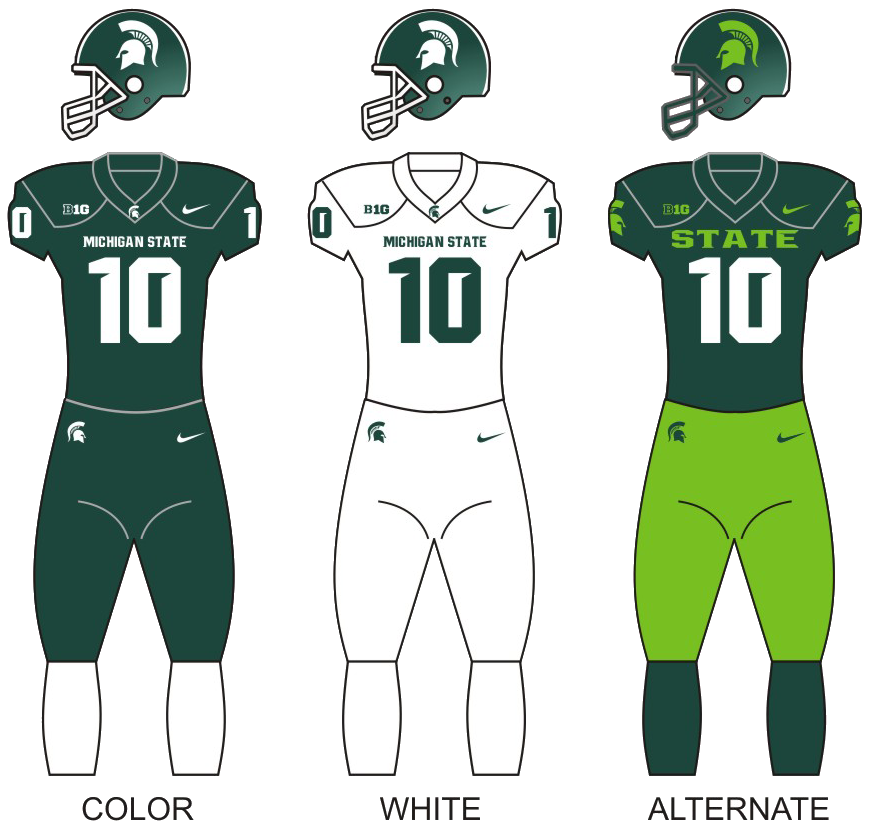

2025 Big Ten Conference football standings
	Conf.			Overall
Team	W		L	W		L
No. 1 Indiana y$#^	9	–	0	16	–	0
No. 5 Ohio State y^	9	–	0	12	–	2
No. 4 Oregon ^	8	–	1	13	–	2
No. 21 Michigan	7	–	2	9	–	4
No. 20 USC	7	–	2	9	–	4
No. 17 Iowa	6	–	3	9	–	4
Illinois	5	–	4	9	–	4
Washington	5	–	4	9	–	4
Minnesota	5	–	4	8	–	5
Nebraska	4	–	5	7	–	6
Northwestern	4	–	5	7	–	6
Penn State	3	–	6	7	–	6
UCLA	3	–	6	3	–	9
Rutgers	2	–	7	5	–	7
Wisconsin	2	–	7	4	–	8
Maryland	1	–	8	4	–	8
Michigan State	1	–	8	4	–	8
Purdue	0	–	9	2	–	10
Championship: Indiana 13, Ohio State 10
# – College Football Playoff champion; ^ – College Football Playoff participant; $ – Conference champion; y – Championship game participant; As of November 21, 2026; Rankings from AP Poll

The 2025 Michigan State Spartans football team represented Michigan State University as a member of the Big Ten Conference during the 2025 NCAA Division I FBS football season. The Spartans played their home games at Spartan Stadium located in East Lansing, Michigan, and were led by second-year head coach Jonathan Smith.

After beating Youngstown State on September 3, Smith became the first Spartan head coach to start his first two seasons 3–0. However, the Spartans lost their next eight games before winning their final game of the season to finish the season 4–8, 1–8 in Big Ten play.

On November 30, the school fired Smith after two seasons. Shortly thereafter, the school named former Northwestern head coach Pat Fitzgerald the team's new coach.

== Schedule ==
Date	Time	Opponent	Site	TV	Result	Attendance
August 29	7:00 p.m.	Western Michigan*	Spartan Stadium; East Lansing, MI	FS1	W 23–6	71,657
September 6	7:30 p.m.	Boston College*	Spartan Stadium; East Lansing, MI	NBC	W 42–40 ^{2OT}	70,510
September 13	3:30 p.m.	Youngstown State*	Spartan Stadium; East Lansing, MI	BTN	W 41–24	71,301
September 20	11:00 p.m.	at No. 25 USC	Los Angeles Memorial Coliseum; Los Angeles, CA	FOX	L 31–45	67,614
October 4	4:00 p.m.	at Nebraska	Memorial Stadium; Lincoln, NE	FS1	L 27–38	86,496
October 11	12:00 p.m.	UCLA^{†}	Spartan Stadium; East Lansing, MI	BTN	L 13–38	72,109
October 18	3:30 p.m.	at No. 3 Indiana	Memorial Stadium; Bloomington, IN (rivalry)	Peacock	L 13–38	55,165
October 25	7:30 p.m.	No. 25 Michigan	Spartan Stadium; East Lansing, MI (rivalry)	NBC	L 20–31	75,085
November 1	3:30 p.m.	at Minnesota	Huntington Bank Stadium; Minneapolis, MN	BTN	L 20–23 ^{OT}	45,339
November 15	3:30 p.m.	Penn State	Spartan Stadium; East Lansing, MI (rivalry)	CBS	L 10–28	61,671
November 22	3:30 p.m.	at Iowa	Kinnick Stadium; Iowa City, IA	FS1	L 17–20	69,250
November 29	7:00 p.m.	vs. Maryland	Ford Field; Detroit, MI	FS1	W 38–28	30,317
*Non-conference game; ^{†}Homecoming; Rankings from AP Poll - Released prior to game; All times are in Eastern time; Source:

== Game summaries ==
=== vs Western Michigan ===
Western Michigan Broncos (0–0) at Michigan State Spartans (0–0) – Game summary

Quarter	1	2	3	4	Total
Broncos	0	0	0	6	6
Spartans	7	14	2	0	23

at Spartan Stadium • East Lansing, Michigan

- Date: August 29
- Game time: 7:00 p.m.
- Game weather: 68 °F (20 °C), Wind: 5 mph S, Sunny
- Game attendance: 71,657
- Referee: Jason Nickleby
- TV announcers (FS1): Dan Hellie (play-by-play) and Petros Papadakis (analyst)

Game information

First quarter

- MSU – Brandon Tullis 12-yard run (Blake Sislo kick), 5:30. Spartans 7–0. Drive: 10 plays, 74 yards, 5:42.

Second quarter

- MSU – Nick Marsh 7-yard pass from Aidan Chiles (Blake Sislo kick), 10:43. Spartans 14–0. Drive: 12 plays, 75 yards, 5:59.
- MSU – Makhi Frazier 9-yard run (Blake Sislo kick), 1:58. Spartans 21–0. Drive: 6 plays, 54 yards, 2:25.

Third quarter

- MSU – Team safety, 8:01. Spartans 23–0.

Fourth quarter

- WMU – Tate Hallock 32-yard interception return (pass failed), 2:51. Spartans 23–6. Drive: 4 plays, 77 yards, 0:23.

Statistics	WMU	MSU
First downs	10	20
Plays–yards	57–217	65–341
Rushes–yards	24–29	41–186
Passing yards	188	155
Passing: Comp–Att–Int	16–33–1	17–24–1
Turnovers	1	2
Time of possession	23:13	36:47

Team	Category	Player	Statistics
Western Michigan	Passing	Brady Jones	11/23, 97 yards, INT
Western Michigan	Rushing	Jalen Buckley	9 carries, 21 yards
Western Michigan	Receiving	Baylin Brooks	3 receptions, 85 yards
Michigan State	Passing	Aidan Chiles	17/23, 155 yards, TD
Michigan State	Rushing	Makhi Frazier	14 carries, 103 yards, TD
Michigan State	Receiving	Omari Kelly	7 receptions, 75 yards

=== vs Boston College ===
Boston College Eagles (1–0) at Michigan State Spartans (1–0) – Game summary

Quarter	1	2	3	4	OT	2OT	Total
Eagles	0	21	3	3	7	6	40
Spartans	7	7	10	3	7	8	42

at Spartan Stadium • East Lansing, Michigan

- Date: September 6
- Game time: 7:30 p.m.
- Game weather: 55 °F (13 °C), Wind: 3 mph NW, Cloudy
- Game attendance: 70,510
- Referee: Jerry Magallanes
- TV announcers (NBC): Noah Eagle (play-by-play), Todd Blackledge (analyst), and Kathryn Tappen (sideline)

Game information

First quarter

- (05:23) MSU - Nick Marsh 11-yard pass from Aidan Chiles (Blake Sislo kick), Drive: 11 plays, 80 yards, 5:53 (Spartans 7–0)

Second quarter

- (12:50) BC - Turbo Richard 8-yard pass from Dylan Lonergan, (Luca Lombardo kick), Drive: 6 plays, 88 yards, 3:03 (Tied 7–7)
- (07:45) BC - Jaedn Skeete 12-yard pass from Dylan Lonergan, (Luca Lombardo kick), Drive : 8 plays, 49 yards, 3:12 (Eagles 14–7)
- (05:40) MSU - Michael Masunas 3-yard pass from Aidan Chiles, (Blake Sislo kick), Drive: 4 plays, 33 yards, 1:50 (Tied 14–14)
- (00:31) BC - Reed Harris 14 yard pass from Dylan Lonergan (Luca Lombardo kick), Drive: 10 plays, 80 yards, 5:04 (Eagles 21–14)

Third quarter

- (12:50) MSU - Nick Marsh 41-yard pass from Aidan Chiles, (Blake Sislo kick), Drive: 4 plays, 75 yards, 2:10 (Tied 21–21)
- (07:00) BC - Dylan Lonergan 37-yard field goal, Drive: 10 plays, 56 yards, 5:46 (Eagles 24–21)
- (02:17) MSU - Martin Connington 50-yard field goal, Drive: 9 plays, 41-yard, 4:38 (Tied 24–24)

Fourth quarter

- (04:08) MSU - Martin Connington 39-yard field goal, Drive: 11 plays, 46 yards, 6:26 (Spartans 27–24)
- (01:16) BC - Luca Lombardo 38 -yard field goal, Drive: 12 plays, 61 yards, 2:46 (Tied 27–27)

First Overtime

- (00:00) MSU - Jay Coyne 5-yard pass from Aidan Chiles, (Martin Connington kick), Drive: 5 plays, 25 yards, 00:00 (Spartans 34–27)
- (00:00) BC - Jeremiah Franklin 6-yard pass from Dylan Lonergan, (Luca Lombardo kick), Drive: 4 plays, 25 yards, 00:00 (Tied 34–34)

Second Overtime

- (00:00) BC - Turbo Richard 8-yaed run (Two point conversion failed pass), Drive: 2 plays, 25 yards, 00:00 (Eagles 40–34)
- (00:00) MSU - Aidan Chiles 3-yard run (Two point conversion good Omari Kelly pass), Drive: 3 plays, 25 yards, 00:00 (Spartans 42–40)

Statistics	BC	MSU
First downs	25	21
Plays–yards	70–457	64–380
Rushes–yards	25–67	35–149
Passing yards	390	231
Passing: comp–att–int	34–45–0	19–29–0
Turnovers	1	1
Time of possession	30:12	29:48

Team	Category	Player	Statistics
Boston College	Passing	Dylan Lonergan	34/45, 390 yards, 4 TD
Boston College	Rushing	Turbo Richard	13 carries, 55 yards, TD
Boston College	Receiving	Lewis Bond	11 receptions, 90 yards
Michigan State	Passing	Aidan Chiles	19/29, 231 yards, 4 TD
Michigan State	Rushing	Makhi Frazier	17 carries, 81 yards
Michigan State	Receiving	Nick Marsh	5 receptions, 68 yards, 2 TD

=== vs Youngstown State (FCS) ===
Youngstown State Penguins (FCS) (2–0) at Michigan State Spartans (2–0) – Game summary

Quarter	1	2	3	4	Total
Penguins (FCS)	3	7	7	7	24
Spartans	7	10	14	10	41

at Spartan Stadium • East Lansing, Michigan

- Date: September 13
- Game time: 3:30 p.m.
- Game weather: 76 °F (24 °C), Wind: 5 mph N, Sunny
- Game attendance: 71,301
- Referee: Gregory Blum
- TV announcers (BTN): Guy Haberman (play-by-play), Yogi Roth (analyst), and Rhett Lewis (sideline)

Game information
First quarter
- (7:21) YSU – Andrew Lastovka 28-yard field goal (Drive: 15 plays, 65 yards, 7:39; YSU 3–0)
- (1:13) MSU – Rodney Bullard Jr. 8-yard run, Martin Connington kick (Drive: 10 plays, 82 yards, 6:01; MSU 7–3)

Second quarter

- (8:07) MSU – Makhi Frazier 1-yard run, Martin Connington kick (Drive: 12 plays, 87 yards, 6:37; MSU 14–3)
- (5:59) YSU – Jaden Gilbert 1-yard run, Andrew Lastovka kick (Drive: 4 plays, 65 yards, 2:08; MSU 14–10)
- (0:00) MSU – Martin Connington 24-yard field goal (Drive: 9 plays, 70 yards, 1:14; MSU 17–10)

Third quarter

- (10:57) MSU – Brandon Tullis 4-yard run, Martin Connington kick (Drive: 1 play, 4 yards, 0:04; MSU 24–10)
- (6:22) MSU – Michael Masunas 28-yard pass from Aidan Chiles, Martin Connington kick (Drive: 6 plays, 64 yards, 3:32; MSU 31–10)
- (1:17) YSU – RK Dandridge 3-yard pass from Beau Brungard, Andrew Lastovka kick (Drive: 8 plays, 80 yards, 4:59; MSU 31–17)

Fourth quarter

- (8:44) MSU – Martin Connington 27-yard field goal (Drive: 11 plays, 71 yards, 6:11; MSU 34–17)
- (3:05) YSU – Kylon Wilson 19-yard pass from Beau Brungard, Andrew Lastovka kick (Drive: 11 plays, 75 yards, 5:39; MSU 34–24)
- (1:48) MSU – Elijah Tau-Tolliver 22-yard run, Martin Connington kick (Drive: 5 plays, 45 yards, 1:16; MSU 41–24)

Statistics	YSU	MSU
First downs	14	23
Plays–yards	61–339	62–444
Rushes–yards	26–97	33–174
Passing yards	242	270
Passing: comp–att–int	24–35–1	22–29–1
Turnovers	1	1
Time of possession	29:54	30:06

Team	Category	Player	Statistics
Youngstown State	Passing	Beau Brungard	24/34, 242 yards, 2 TD, INT
Youngstown State	Rushing	Jaden Gilbert	7 carries, 72 yards, TD
Youngstown State	Receiving	Max Tomczak	7 receptions, 78 yards
Michigan State	Passing	Aidan Chiles	22/29, 270 yards, TD, INT
Michigan State	Rushing	Aidan Chiles	8 carries, 76 yards
Michigan State	Receiving	Nick Marsh	6 receptions, 94 yards

=== at No. 25 USC ===
Michigan State Spartans (3–0) at No. 25 USC Trojans (3–0) – Game summary

Quarter	1	2	3	4	Total
Spartans	7	3	14	7	31
No. 25 Trojans	10	14	7	14	45

at Los Angeles Memorial Coliseum • Los Angeles, California

- Date: September 20
- Game time: 11:00 p.m.
- Game weather: 70 °F (21 °C), Wind: 4 mph W, Clear
- Game attendance: 67,614
- Referee: Ron Snodgrass
- TV announcers (FOX): Jason Benetti (play-by-play), Robert Griffin III (analyst), and Alexa Landestoy (sideline)

Game information

First quarter

- (09:03) USC FG – Ryon Sayeri 25-yard field goal, Drive: 12 plays, 73 yards, 5:57 (Trojans 3–0)
- (05:27) MSU TD – Chrishon McCray 42-yard pass from Aidan Chiles (Martin Connington kick) Drive: 6 plays, 75 yards, 3:36 (Spartans 7–3)
- (02:38) USC TD – Jayden Maiava 15-yard run (Ryon Sayeri kick), Drive: 6 plays, 72 yards, 2:42 (Trojans 10–7)

Second quarter

- (11:36) USC TD – Makai Lemon 40-yard pass from Jayden Maiava (Ryon Sayeri kick), Drive: 5 plays, 93 yards, 2:00 (Trojans 17–7)
- (04:26) MSU FG – Martin Connington 29-yard field goal, Drive: 8 plays, 44 yards, 3:39 (Trojans 17–10)
- (00:37) USC FG – Tanook Hines 7-yard pass from Jayden Maiava (Ryon Sayeri kick), Drive: 11 plays, 88 yards, 3:42 (Trojans 24–10)

Third quarter

- (11:22) USC TD – Walker Lyons 10-yard pass from Jayden Maiava (Ryon Sayeri kick), Drive: 4 plays, 57 yards, 1:49 (Trojans 31–10)
- (05:58) MSU TD – Aidan Chiles 4-yard run (Martin Connington kick), Drive: 11 plays, 87 yards, 5:24 (Trojans 31–17)
- (00:40) MSU TD – Jack Velling 1-yard pass from Aidan Chiles (Martin Connington kick), Drive: 8 plays, 32 yards, 5:10 (Trojans 31–24)

Fourth quarter

- (8:20) USC TD – Makai Lemon 4-yard run (Ryon Sayeri kick), Drive: 13 plays, 75 yards, 7:20 (Trojans 38–24)
- (02:57) USC TD – Jayden Maiava 1-yard run (Ryon Sayeri kick), Drive: 7 plays, 28 yards, 3:33 (Trojans 45–24)
- (02:39) MSU TD – Omari Kelly 75-yard pass from Aidan Chiles (Martin Connington kick), Drive: 2 plays, 75 yards, 00:18 (Trojans 45–31)

Statistics	MSU	USC
First downs	20	27
Plays–yards	55–337	66–523
Rushes–yards	32–112	40–289
Passing yards	225	234
Passing: comp–att–int	13–23–0	20–26–0
Turnovers	0	1
Time of possession	28:54	31:06

Team	Category	Player	Statistics
Michigan State	Passing	Aidan Chiles	12/21, 212 yards, 3 TD
Michigan State	Rushing	Makhi Frazier	14 carries, 61 yards
Michigan State	Receiving	Omari Kelly	6 receptions, 133 yards, TD
USC	Passing	Jayden Maiava	20/26, 234 yards, 3 TD
USC	Rushing	Waymond Jordan	18 carries, 157 yards
USC	Receiving	Makai Lemon	8 receptions, 127 yards, TD

=== at Nebraska ===
Michigan State Spartans (3–1) at Nebraska Cornhuskers (3–1) – Game summary

Quarter	1	2	3	4	Total
Spartans	0	7	14	6	27
Cornhuskers	14	0	7	17	38

at Memorial Stadium • Lincoln, Nebraska

- Date: October 4
- Game time: 4:00 p.m.
- Game weather: 86 °F (30 °C), Wind: 20 mph S, Sunny
- Game attendance: 86,496
- Referee: Jeff Servinski
- TV announcers (FS1): Tim Brando (play-by-play), Devin Gardner (analyst), and Josh Sims (sideline)

Game information

First Quarter

- (9:09) NEB TD – Emmett Johnson 2-yard run (Kyle Cunanan kick), Drive: 9 plays, 48 yards, 4:14 (Cornhuskers 7–0)
- (7:37) NEB TD – Carter Nelson 3-yard blocked punt return (Kyle Cunanan kick), (Cornhuskers 14–0)

Second Quarter

- (12:52) MSU TD – Jack Velling 2-yard pass from Alessio Millvojevic (Martin Connington kick), Drive: 17 plays, 75 yards, 9:45 (Cornhuskers 14–7)

Third Quarter

- (6:08) MSU TD – Aidan Chiles 16-yard run (Martin Connington kick), Drive: 11 plays, 48 yards, 7:00 (Tied 14–14)
- (2:37) MSU TD – Aidan Chiles 4-yard run (Martin Connington kick), Drive: 7 plays, 38 yards, 3:24 (Spartans 21–14)
- (1:11) NEB TD - Emmett Johnson 23-yard run (Kyle Cunanan kick), Drive 5 plays, 75 yards, 1:26 (Tied 21–21)

Fourth Quarter

- (13:32) NEB FG – Kyle Cunanan 27-yard field goal, Drive: 7 plays, 19 yards, 2:36 (Cornhuskers 24–21)
- (6:45) NEB TD – Nyziah Hunter 59-yard pass from Dylan Raiola (Kyle Cunanan kick), Drive: 1 play, 59 yards, 0:09 (Cornhuskers 31–21)
- (4:27) NEB TD – Emmett Johnson 11-yard run (Kyle Cunanan kick), Drive: 2 plays, 17 yards, 0:50 (Cornhuskers 38–21)
- (2:01) MSU TD - Allessio Millvojevic 1-yard run (Omari Kelly pass from Allesssio Millvojevic two point conversion failed), Drive 7 plays, 75 yards, 2:26 (Cornhuskers 38-27)

Statistics	MSU	NEB
First downs	17	15
Plays–yards	68–240	55–261
Rushes–yards	38–84	31–67
Passing yards	156	194
Passing: comp–att–int	15–30–2	16–24–1
Turnovers	3	1
Time of possession	33:24	26:36

Team	Category	Player	Statistics
Michigan State	Passing	Aidan Chiles	9/23, 85 yards, 2 INT
Michigan State	Rushing	Makhi Frazier	18 carries, 58 yards
Michigan State	Receiving	Nick Marsh	4 receptions, 41 yards
Nebraska	Passing	Dylan Raiola	16/24, 194 yards, TD, INT
Nebraska	Rushing	Emmett Johnson	13 carries, 83 yards, 3 TD
Nebraska	Receiving	Nyziah Hunter	4 receptions, 93 yards, TD

=== vs UCLA ===
UCLA Bruins (1–4) at Michigan State Spartans (3–2) – Game summary

Quarter	1	2	3	4	Total
Bruins	10	14	14	0	38
Spartans	7	0	0	6	13

at Spartan Stadium • East Lansing, Michigan

- Date: October 11
- Game time: 12:00 p.m.
- Game weather: Sunny, • Temperature: 56 °F (13 °C) • Wind: NW at 10 miles per hour (16 km/h)
- Game attendance: 72,109
- Referee: Bryan Banks
- TV announcers (BTN): Mark Followill (play-by-play), Yogi Roth (analyst), and Rhett Lewis (sideline)
- ESPN box score

Game information

First quarter

- (9:07) MSU – Aidan Chiles 2-yard run (Martin Connington kick), Drive: 10 plays, 59 yards, 4:49 (Spartans 7–0))
- (4:41) UCLA – Mateen Bhaghani 47-yard field goal, Drive: 10 plays, 46 yards, 4:26 (Spartans 7–3)
- (1:39) UCLA – Jalen Berger 16-yard run (Mateen Bhaghani kick), Drive: 3 plays, 34 yards, 1:25 (Bruins 10–7)

Second quarter

- (10:17) UCLA – Jalen Berger 3-yard pass from Nico Iamaleava (Mateen Bhaghani kick), Drive: 10 plays, 63 yards, 5:21 (Bruins 17–7)
- (4:09) UCLA – Titus Mokiao-Atimalala 12-yard pass from Nico Iamaleava (Mateen Bhaghani kick), Drive: 8 plays, 32 yards, 4:05 (Bruins 24–7)

Third quarter

- (3:55) UCLA – Jaivian Thomas 1-yard run (Mateen Bhaghani kick), Drive: 12 plays, 62 yards, 6:46 (Bruins 31-7)
- (1:44) UCLA – Jalen Berger 13-yard pass from Nico Iamaleava (Mateen Bhaghani kick), Drive: 5 plays, 33 yards, 1:12 (Bruins 38–7)

Fourth quarter

- (13:09) MSU – Nick Marsh 5-yard pass from Alessio Milivojevic (Martin Connington PAT failed), Drive: 9 plays, 75 yards, 3:35 (Bruins 38–13)

Statistics	UCLA	MSU
First downs	20	14
Plays–yards	67-418	60-253
Rushes–yards	43-238	25-87
Passing yards	180	166
Passing: comp–att–int	16-24-0	16-35-0
Turnovers	0	1
Time of possession	36:24	23:36

Team	Category	Player	Statistics
UCLA	Passing	Nico Iamaleava	16/24, 180 yards, 3 TD
UCLA	Rushing	Jalen Berger	12 carries, 89 yards, TD
UCLA	Receiving	Mikey Matthews	2 receptions, 46 yards
Michigan State	Passing	Alessio Milivojevic	8/18, 100 yards, TD
Michigan State	Rushing	Makhi Frazier	12 carries, 58 yards
Michigan State	Receiving	Nick Marsh	7 receptions, 77 yards, TD

=== at No. 3 Indiana (Old Brass Spittoon) ===
Michigan State Spartans (3–3) at No. 3 Indiana Hoosiers (6–0) – Game summary

Quarter	1	2	3	4	Total
Spartans	3	7	0	3	13
No. 3 Hoosiers	7	14	14	3	38

at Memorial Stadium • Bloomington, Indiana

- Date: October 18
- Game time: 3:30 p.m.
- Game weather: Cloudy
- Game attendance: 55,165
- Referee: Chris Coyte
- TV announcers (Peacock): Dan Hicks (play-by-play), Jason Garrett (analyst), and Zora Stephenson (sideline)

Game information

First quarter

- (8:07) MSU FG – Martin Connington 38-yard field goal, Drive: 13 plays, 55 yards, 6:53 (Spartans 3–0)
- (2:40) IU TD – E.J. Williams Jr. 13-yard pass from Fernando Mendoza (Nico Radicic kick), Drive: 11 plays, 75 yards, 5:27 (Hoosiers 7–3)

Second quarter

- (9:22) MSU TD – Nick Marsh 15-yard pass from Aidan Chiles (Martin Connington kick), Drive: 12 plays, 75 yards, 8:18 (Spartans 10–7)
- (6:47) IU TD – Elijah Sarratt 24-yard pass from Fernando Mendoza (Nico Radicic kick), Drive: 5 plays, 75 yards, 2:35 (Hoosiers 14–10)
- (0:59) IU TD - Kaelon Black 29-yard run (Nico Radicic kick), Drive: 8 plays, 80 yards, 1:47 (Hoosiers 21-10)

Third quarter

- (13:09) IU TD – Omar Cooper Jr. 48-yard pass from Fernando Mendoza (Nico Radicic kick), Drive: 4 plays, 75 yards, 1:51 (Hoosiers 28–10)
- (3:55) IU TD – Elijah Sarratt 27-yard pass from Fernando Mendoza (Nico Radicic kick), Drive: 8 plays, 68 yards, 4:01 (Hoosiers 35–10)

Fourth quarter

- (1:56) IU FG – Nico Radicic 31-yard field goal, Drive: 11 plays, 54 yards, 7:03 (Hoosiers 38–10)
- (0:33) MSU FG – Martin Connington 34-yard field goal, Drive: 8 plays, 59 yards, 1:23 (Hoosiers 38–13)

Statistics	MSU	IU
First downs	19	24
Plays–yards	65–367	57–464
Rushes–yards	24–74	28–132
Passing yards	293	332
Passing: comp–att–int	30–38–0	24–28–0
Turnovers	0	0
Time of possession	31:14	28:46

Team	Category	Player	Statistics
Michigan State	Passing	Aidan Chiles	27/33, 243 yards, TD
Michigan State	Rushing	Aidan Chiles	8 carries, 48 yards
Michigan State	Receiving	Nick Marsh	7 receptions, 64 yards, TD
Indiana	Passing	Fernando Mendoza	24/28, 332 yards, 4 TD
Indiana	Rushing	Kaelon Black	10 carries, 64 yards, TD
Indiana	Receiving	Omar Cooper Jr.	8 receptions, 115 yards, TD

=== vs No. 25 Michigan (Paul Bunyan Trophy) ===
No. 25 Michigan Wolverines (5–2) at Michigan State Spartans (3–4) – Game summary

Quarter	1	2	3	4	Total
No. 25 Wolverines	10	0	14	7	31
Spartans	0	7	0	13	20

at Spartan Stadium • East Lansing, Michigan

- Date: October 25
- Game time: 7:30 p.m.
- Game weather: 48 °F (9 °C), sunny, NE 5 miles per hour (8.0 km/h)
- Game attendance: 75,085
- Referee: Ron Snodgrass
- TV announcers (NBC): Noah Eagle (play-by-play), Todd Blackledge (analyst), and Kathryn Tappen (sideline)

Game information

First quarter

- (10:07) MICH – Dominic Zvada 21-yard field goal (Drive: 10 plays, 31 yards, 4:07; MICH 3–0)
- (3:58) MICH – Bryce Underwood 13-yard run (Dominic Zvada kick) (Drive: 7 plays, 63 yards, 3:18; MICH 10–0)

Second quarter

- (8:24) MSU – Aidan Chiles 1-yard run (Martin Connington kick) (Drive: 10 plays, 73 yards, 6:36; MICH 10–7)

Third quarter

- (11:50) MICH – Justice Haynes 5-yard run (Dominic Zvada kick) (Drive: 7 plays, 71 yards, 3:02; MICH 17–7)
- (3:08) MICH – Justice Haynes 14-yard run (Dominic Zvada kick) (Drive: 5 plays, 52 yards, 2:38; MICH 24–7)

Fourth quarter

- (12:34) MSU – Brandon Tullis 1-yard run (pass failed) (Drive: 12 plays, 75 yards, 5:34; MICH 24–13)
- (2:48) MICH – Jordan Marshall 56-yard run (Dominic Zvada kick) (Drive: 5 plays, 71 yards, 1:49; MICH 31–13)
- (0:07) MSU – Michael Masunas 21-yard pass from Alessio Milivojevic (Martin Connington kick) (Drive: 9 plays, 75 yards, 2:41; Michigan 31–20)

Statistics	MICH	MSU
First downs	20	18
Plays–yards	67–362	72–305
Rushes–yards	49–276	38–115
Passing yards	86	190
Passing: comp–att–int	8-17-0	19-34-0
Turnovers	1	1
Time of possession	29:27	30:33

Team	Category	Player	Statistics
Michigan	Passing	Bryce Underwood	8/17, 86 yards
Michigan	Rushing	Justice Haynes	26 carries, 152 yards, 2 TD
Michigan	Receiving	Andrew Marsh	3 receptions, 54 yards
Michigan State	Passing	Aidan Chiles	14/28, 130 yards
Michigan State	Rushing	Makhi Frazier	14 carries, 109 yards
Michigan State	Receiving	Nick Marsh	6 receptions, 75 yards

=== at Minnesota ===
Michigan State Spartans (3–5) at Minnesota Golden Gophers (5–3) – Game summary

Quarter	1	2	3	4	OT	Total
Spartans	0	0	7	10	3	20
Golden Gophers	7	3	0	7	6	23

at Huntington Bank Stadium • Minneapolis, Minnesota

- Date: November 1
- Game time: 3:30 p.m.
- Game weather: 45 °F (7 °C), sunny, S 4 miles per hour (6.4 km/h)
- Game attendance: 45,339
- Referee: Tim O'Dey
- TV announcers (BTN): Guy Haberman (play-by-play), Yogi Roth (analyst), and Rhett Lewis (sideline)

Game information

First quarter

- (2:24) MINN – Fame Ijeboi 1-yard run, Brady Denaburg kick (Drive: 5 plays, 63 yards, 2:10; Minnesota 7-0)

Second quarter

- (9:10) MINN – Brady Denaburg 30-yard field goal (Drive: 10 plays, 51 yards, 4:34; Minnesota 10-0)

Third quarter

- (14:05) MSU – Rodney Bullard Jr. 71-yard pass from Alessio Milivojevic, Martin Connington kick (Drive: 3 plays, 75 yards, 0:55; Minnesota 10-7)

Fourth quarter

- (14:16) MSU – Martin Connington 34-yard field goal (Drive: 3 plays, 88 yards, 1:07; 10-10)
- (1:52) MSU – Brandon Tullis 1-yard run, Martin Connington kick (Drive: 3 plays, 88 yards, 1:07; Michigan State 17-10)
- (0:29) MINN – Drake Lindsey 2-yard run, Brady Denaburg kick (Drive: 9 plays, 65 yards, 1:23; 17-17)

Overtime

- MSU – Martin Connington 36-yard field goal (Drive: 4 plays, 7 yards Michigan State 20-17)
- MINN – Drake Lindsey 3-yard run (Drive: 5 plays, 25 yards Minnesota 23-20)

Statistics	MSU	MINN
First downs	19	18
Plays–yards	69–467	62–301
Rushes–yards	41–156	23–104
Passing yards	311	197
Passing: comp–att–int	20–28–0	26–39–0
Turnovers	0	0
Time of possession	34:34	25:26

Team	Category	Player	Statistics
Michigan State	Passing	Alessio Milivojevic	20/28, 311 yards, TD
Michigan State	Rushing	Elijah Tau-Tolliver	11 carries, 127 yards
Michigan State	Receiving	Rodney Bullard Jr.	4 receptions, 102 yards, TD
Minnesota	Passing	Drake Lindsey	26/39, 197 yards
Minnesota	Rushing	Fame Ijeboi	17 carries, 108 yards, TD
Minnesota	Receiving	Javon Tracy	7 receptions, 61 yards

=== vs Penn State (Land Grant Trophy) ===
Penn State Nittany Lions (3–6) at Michigan State Spartans (3–6) – Game summary

Quarter	1	2	3	4	Total
Nittany Lions	7	7	0	14	28
Spartans	7	3	0	0	10

at Spartan Stadium • East Lansing, Michigan

- Date: November 15
- Game time: 3:30 p.m.
- Game weather: 64 °F (18 °C) • Mostly cloudy
- Game attendance: 61,671
- Referee: Kole Knueppel
- TV announcers (CBS): Brad Nessler (play-by-play), Gary Danielson (analyst) and Jenny Dell (sideline)
- ESPN box score

Game information

First quarter

- MSU – Elijah Tau-Tolliver 57-yard run (Martin Connington kick), 12:46. Spartans 7–0. Drive: 1 play, 57 yards, 0:10.
- PSU – Kaytron Allen 8-yard run (Ryan Barker kick), 5:50. Tied 7–7. Drive: 12 plays, 75 yards, 6:52.

Second quarter

- MSU – Martin Connington 24-yard field goal, 8:40. Spartans 10–7. Drive: 8 plays, 52 yards, 4:47.
- PSU – Devonte Ross 75-yard pass from Ethan Grunkemeyer (Ryan Barker kick), 8:30. Nittany Lions 14–10. Drive: 1 play, 75 yards, 0:10.

Third quarter

- No scoring plays.

Fourth quarter

- PSU – Devonte Ross 4-yard pass from Ethan Grunkemeyer (Ryan Barker kick), 4:32. Nittany Lions 21–10. Drive: 13 plays, 76 yards, 9:05.
- PSU – Kaytron Allen 26-yard run (Ryan Barker kick), 2:07. Nittany Lions 28–10. Drive: 3 plays, 62 yards, 1:08.

Statistics	PSU	MSU
First downs	19	13
Plays–yards	63–367	49–229
Rushes–yards	50–240	22–101
Passing yards	127	128
Passing: comp–att–int	8–13–0	17–27–0
Turnovers	0	1
Time of possession	37:19	22:41

Team	Category	Player	Statistics
Penn State	Passing	Ethan Grunkemeyer	8/13, 127 yards, 2 TD
Penn State	Rushing	Kaytron Allen	25 carries, 181 yards, 2 TD
Penn State	Receiving	Devonte Ross	2 receptions, 79 yards, 2 TD
Michigan State	Passing	Alessio Milivojevic	17/27, 128 yards
Michigan State	Rushing	Elijah Tau-Tolliver	6 carries, 79 yards, TD
Michigan State	Receiving	Elijah Tau-Tolliver	8 receptions, 73 yards

=== at Iowa ===
Michigan State Spartans (3–7) at Iowa Hawkeyes (6–4) – Game summary

Quarter	1	2	3	4	Total
Spartans	0	3	14	0	17
Hawkeyes	7	0	0	13	20

at Kinnick Stadium • Iowa City, Iowa

- Date: November 22
- Game time: 3:30 p.m.
- Game weather: 54 °F (12 °C), Sunny, Wind SW 13 mph (21 km/h)
- Game attendance: 69,250
- Referee: Mark Kluczynski
- TV announcers (FS1): Connor Onion (play-by-play) and Mark Helfrich (analyst)

Game information

First quarter

- IOWA – Kaden Wetjen 62-yard punt return (Drew Stevens kick), 3:38. Hawkeyes 7–0.

Second quarter

- MSU – Martin Connington 27-yard field goal, 2:54. Hawkeyes 7–3. 14 plays, 78 yards, 6:19.

Third quarter

- MSU – Chrishon McCray 45-yard pass from Alessio Milivojevic (Martin Connington kick), 8:58. Spartans 10–7. 2 plays, 38 yards, 1:13.
- MSU – Chrishon McCray 5-yard pass from Alessio Milivojevic (Martin Connington kick), 1:13. Spartans 17–7. 11 plays, 80 yards, 5:35.

Fourth quarter

- IOWA – Drew Stevens 26-yard field goal, 11:27. Spartans 17–10. 14 plays, 78 yards, 6:19.
- IOWA – Jacob Gill 13-yard pass from Mark Gronowski (Drew Stevens kick), 1:29. Tied 17–17. 5 plays, 42 yards, 1:08.
- IOWA – Drew Stevens 44-yard field goal, 0:00. Hawkeyes 20–17. 5 plays, 53 yards, 0:41.

Statistics	MSU	IOWA
First downs	19	16
Plays–yards	69–335	61–301
Rushes–yards	27–80	39–154
Passing yards	255	147
Passing: comp–att–int	25–42–1	12–22–1
Turnovers	1	2
Time of possession	29:31	28:41

Team	Category	Player	Statistics
Michigan State	Passing	Alessio Milivojevic	25/42, 255 yards, 2 TD, INT
Michigan State	Rushing	Brandon Tullis	8 carries, 56 yards
Michigan State	Receiving	Jack Velling	8 receptions, 88 yards
Iowa	Passing	Mark Gronowski	12/22, 147 yards, TD, INT
Iowa	Rushing	Kamari Moulton	18 carries, 78 yards
Iowa	Receiving	Reece Vander Zee	2 receptions, 46 yards

=== vs Maryland ===
Maryland Terrapins (4-7) at Michigan State Spartans (3-8) – Game summary

Quarter	1	2	3	4	Total
Terrapins	0	7	21	0	28
Spartans	7	17	7	7	38

at Ford Field • Detroit, Michigan

- Date: November 29
- Game time: 7:00 p.m.
- Game weather: Indoor
- Game attendance: 30,317
- Referee: Francisco Villar
- TV announcers (FS1): Dan Hellie (play-by-play) and Petros Papadakis (analyst)

Game information

First quarter

- (9:45) MSU – Kai Rios 1-yard pass from Alessio Milivojevic, Martin Connington kick (Drive: 10 plays, 70 yards, 5:09; Michigan State 7-0)

Second quarter

- (12:26) MSU – Martin Connington 25-yard field goal (Drive: 7 plays, 76 yards, 2:57; Michigan State 10-0)
- (8:40) MSU – Nick Marsh 15-yard pass from Alessio Milivojevic, Martin Connington kick (Drive: 6 plays, 64 yards, 2:30; Michigan State 17-0)
- (5:43) MD – Jalil Farooq 7-yard pass from Malik Washington, Sean O'Haire kick (Drive: 8 plays, 75 yards, 2:57; Michigan State 17-7)
- (0:04) MSU – Jack Velling 9-yard pass from Alessio Milivojevic, Martin Connington kick (Drive: 8 plays, 75 yards, 0:55; Michigan State 24-7)

Third quarter

- (11:36) MD – DeJuan Williams 5-yard run, Sean O'Haire kick (Drive: 10 plays, 75 yards, 3:24; Michigan State 24-14)
- (6:26) MD – Shaleak Knotts 25-yard pass from Malik Washington, Sean O'Haire kick (Drive: 8 plays, 73 yards, 2:15; Michigan State 24-21)
- (6:12) MSU – Alante Brown 92-yard kickoff return, Martin Connington kick (Drive: 0 plays, 0 yards, 0:00; Michigan State 31-21)
- (5:06) MD – Jalil Farooq 24-yard pass from Malik Washington, Sean O'Haire kick (Drive: 4 plays, 75 yards, 1:06; Michigan State 31-28)

Fourth quarter

- (1:56) MSU – Omari Kelly 10-yard pass from Alessio Milivojevic, Martin Connington kick (Drive: 6 plays, 35 yards, 1:05; Michigan State 38-28)

Statistics	MD	MSU
First downs	26	24
Plays–yards	77–534	70–453
Rushes–yards	16–75	31–161
Passing yards	459	292
Passing: comp–att–int	38–61–1	27–39–1
Turnovers	1	1
Time of possession	28:06	31:54

Team	Category	Player	Statistics
Maryland	Passing	Malik Washington	38/61, 459 yards, 3 TD, INT
Maryland	Rushing	DeJuan Williams	5 carries, 52 yards, TD
Maryland	Receiving	Shaleak Knotts	8 receptions, 139 yards, TD
Michigan State	Passing	Alessio Milivojevic	27/39, 292 yards, 4 TD, INT
Michigan State	Rushing	Elijah Tau-Tolliver	13 carries, 95 yards
Michigan State	Receiving	Nick Marsh	7 receptions, 85 yards, TD

== Personnel ==
=== Roster ===
2025 Michigan State Spartans football team roster
Players
Coaches
Offense

Pos.	#	Name	Class
WR	0	Alante Brown	Sr
WR	1	Omari Kelly	Sr
QB	2	Aidan Chiles	Jr
WR	3	Rodney Bullard Jr.	Sr
RB	4	Elijah Tau-Tolliver	Sr
RB	5	Makhi Frazier	So
WR	6	Nick Marsh	So
RB	7	Brandon Tullis	So
WR	8	Evan Boyd	So
QB	11	Alessio Milivojevic	Fr
TE	12	Jack Velling	Sr
WR	13	Chrishon McCray	Jr
WR	14	Bryson Williams	Fr
QB	15	Leo Hannan	Fr
QB	16	Ryland Jessee	Fr
WR	17	Braylon Collier	Fr
WR	18	Atticus Carridine	So
WR	19	Charles Taplin	Fr
RB	20	Shawn Foster	So
WR	22	Jack Yanachik	So
RB	25	Jace Clarizio	Fr
RB	26	Chris Williams	Jr
RB	27	Darrin Jones Jr.	Fr
RB	28	Zion Gist	Fr
TE	31	Jayden Savoury	Fr
RB	33	Jaxon McCaig	Fr
TE	41	Jaxson Wilson	So
FB	44	Jay Coyne	Jr
TE	48	Charlie Baker	Fr
OL	50	Antonio Johnson	Fr
OL	51	Matt Gulbin	Sr
OL	54	Cooper Terpstra	So
OL	55	Rakeem Johnson	Fr
OL	56	Cole Dellinger	So
OL	58	Conner Moore	Jr
OL	62	Justin Bell	Fr
OL	63	Payton Stewart	Fr
OL	65	Stanton Ramil	So
OL	66	Ashton Lepo	Jr
OL	67	Hayden Lorius	Fr
OL	68	Rashawn Rogers	Fr
OL	70	Luka Vincic	Jr
OL	71	Kristian Phillips	Jr
OL	72	Caleb Carter	Sr
OL	73	Rustin Young	Fr
OL	74	Gavin Broscious	Jr
OL	75	Charlton Luniewski	Fr
OL	76	Drew Nichols	Fr
OL	77	Andrew Dennis	Fr
OL	79	Mercer Luniewski	Fr
TE	81	Michael Masunas	Jr
TE	82	Brennan Paracheck	Jr
TE	84	Wyatt Hook	Fr
WR	85	Grant Calcagno	So
TE	88	Kai Rios	Jr
WR	89	Nick Hardy	Fr

Defense

Pos.	#	Name	Class
DB	0	NiJhay Burt	Sr
DB	1	Nikai Martinez	Sr
DB	2	Aydan West	Fr
DB	3	Jeremiah Hughes	Jr
LB	4	Marcellius Pulliam	Jr
LB	5	Jordan Hall	Jr
DB	6	Ade Willie	Sr
DB	7	Joshua Eaton	Sr
LB	8	Aisea Moa	Jr
DL	9	Jalen Thompson	Jr
LB	10	Wayne Matthews III	Sr
DE	11	Anelu Lafaele	Fr
DB	12	Justin Denson Jr.	So
DE	13	Isaac Smith	Sr
DB	14	Malcolm Bell	Sr
DB	15	Caleb Gash	So
DL	16	Grady Kelly	Sr
LB	17	Semaj Bridgeman	So
DB	18	Andrew Brinson IV	So
DB	19	Armorion Smith	Sr
DB	20	Keshawn Williams	Fr
DB	21	Tracy Revels	So
DE	22	Tyler Gillison	Jr
LB	23	Darius Snow	Sr
DB	24	Anthony Pinnace III	Jr
DB	25	Chase Rucker	So
DE	26	Stone Chaney	Fr
DB	27	Devynn Cromwell	Sr
DB	28	Dontavius Nash	Sr
DB	29	George Mullins	Fr
DB	30	Aveon Grose	Jr
DB	31	Deuce Edwards	Fr
DB	32	Evan Young	Fr
LB	33	DiMari Malone	Fr
DB	34	Khalil Majeed	Sr
LB	35	Sam Edwards	Sr
LB	36	Leonard Ah You	Fr
DB	38	Dorian Davis	Jr
DB	39	Elisha West	Fr
LB	40	DeJae White	Fr
DE	41	David Santiago	So
LB	42	David Millikin	Jr
DB	43	Malik Spencer	Sr
DE	44	Cam Williams	Sr
LB	45	Brady Pretzlaf	Fr
DL	51	Kekai Burnett	Fr
DL	52	Mikeshun Beeler	Fr
DL	55	Ben Roberts	Jr
LB	56	Chris Piwowarczyk	Fr
DL	75	Ben Nelson	Jr
DE	87	Luke DeJager	Fr
DL	88	Ru'Quan Buckley	Sr
DL	91	Alex VanSumeren	Jr
DL	93	Jalen Satchell	Sr
DL	94	Cal Thrush	Fr
DL	98	Derrick Simmons	Fr
DL	99	Quindarius Dunnigan	GS

Special teams

Pos.	#	Name	Class
K	29	Martin Connington	Fr
K	40	Tarik Ahmetbasic	So
LS	47	Kaden Schickel	Sr
P	48	Carson Voss	Sr
LS	61	Aiden DeCorte	So
K	86	Blake Sislo	Sr
LS	87	Jack Wills	Fr
P	96	Ryan Eckley	Jr

Head coach

Jonathan Smith

Coordinators/assistant coaches

- Keith Bhonapha – Assistant head coach/co-special teams coordinator/running backs
- Brian Lindgren – Offensive coordinator
- Joe Rossi – Defensive coordinator/linebackers
- Chad Wilt – Co-Special teams coordinator/rush ends
- Jim Michalczik – Offensive linemen/run game coordinator
- Aaron Pflugrad – Pass game coordinator
- Jon Boyer – Quarterbacks
- Blue Adams – Secondary
- James Adams – Safeties
- Courtney Hawkins – Wide receivers
- Legi Suiaunoa – Defensive linemen
- Brian Wozniak – Tight ends/recruiting coordinator
- Joe Begnal – Assistant special teams
- Andrew Bindelglass – Assistant linebackers
- Chris Gordon – Assistant defensive backs
- Cordale Grundy – Assistant tight ends
- Antjuan Simmons – Assistant defensive linemen

Legend

- (C) Team captain
- (S) Suspended
- (I) Ineligible
- Injured
- Redshirt

Roster
Last update: September 14, 2025

=== Coaching staff ===
Name	Position	Season
Jonathan Smith	Head Coach	2nd
Blue Adams	Secondary Coach	2nd
James Adams	Safeties Coach	1st
Keith Bhonapha	Assistant Head Coach/Co-Special Teams Coordinator/Running Backs	2nd
Jon Boyer	Quarterbacks Coach	1st
Courtney Hawkins	Wide Receivers Coach	6th
Brian Lindgren	Offensive Coordinator	2nd
Jim Michalczik	Offensive Line Coach/Run Game Coordinator	2nd
Joe Rossi	Defensive Coordinator/Linebackers Coach	2nd
Legi Suiaunoa	Defensive Line Coach	2nd
Chad Wilt	Co-Special Teams Coordinator/Rush Ends Coach	2nd
Brian Wozniak	Tight Ends Coach/Recruiting Coordinator	2nd
