= Alessio Milivojevic =

American football player (born 2005)

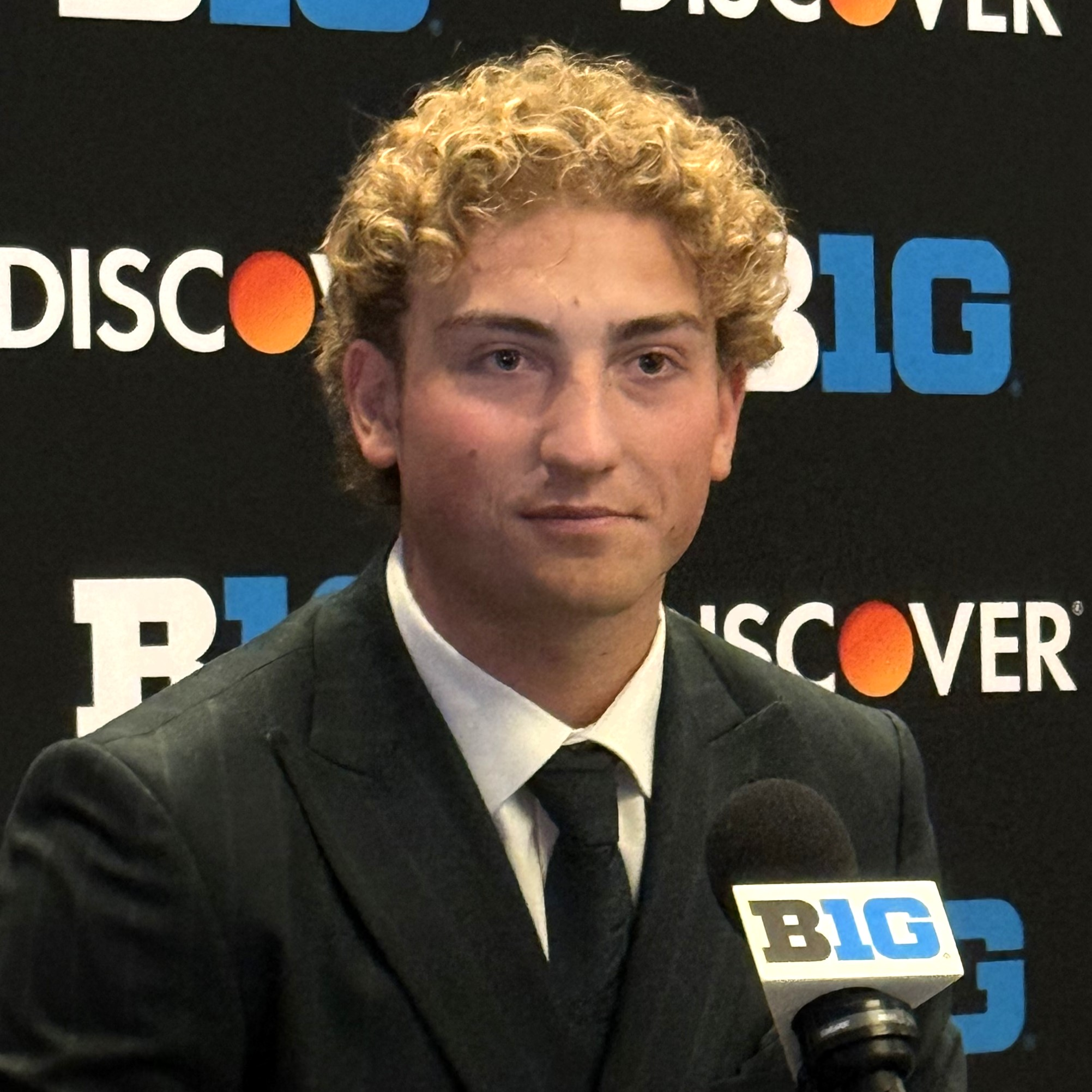
- Milivojevic at 2026 Big Ten Media Day

No. 11 – Michigan State Spartans
- Position: Quarterback
- Class: (redshirt) Sophomore

Personal information
- Born: November 20, 2005 (age 20)
- Listed height: 6 ft 3 in (1.91 m)
- Listed weight: 223 lb (101 kg)

Career information
- High school: St. Francis (Wheaton, Illinois)
- College: Michigan State (2024–present)
- Stats at ESPN

Alessio Milivojevic (born November 20, 2005) is an American college football quarterback for the Michigan State Spartans.

== Early life ==
Milivojevic attended St. Francis High School in Wheaton, Illinois. As a senior, he threw for 3,408 yards and 40 touchdowns. One of the top quarterback recruits from the state of Illinois, Milivojevic flipped his commitment to play college football from Ball State to Michigan State University.

== College career ==
Milivojevic redshirted in 2024, appearing in one game and throwing an interception. He entered the 2025 season as the backup quarterback behind Aidan Chiles. Following poor play from Chiles, Milivojevic was named the Spartans' starting quarterback against Minnesota. In his first career start, he completed 20 passes for 311 yards and a touchdown in a 20–23 overtime loss.

=== Statistics ===
Season	Team	Games			Passing								Rushing			
Season	Team	GP	GS	Record	Comp	Att	Pct	Yards	Avg	TD	Int	Rate	Att	Yards	Avg	TD
2024	Michigan State	1	0	0–0	0	1	0.0	0	0	0	1	-200.0	–	–	–	–
2025	Michigan State	9	4	1–3	111	173	64.2	1,267	7.3	10	3	141.3	31	-59	-1.9	1
2026	Michigan State	7	7	2–5	121	185	65.4	1,263	6.8	7	3	131.8	72	-14	-0.3	1
Career		17	11	3−8	213	359	64.6	2,530	7.0	17	7	135.5	72	-73	-1.0	2
