= Makhi Frazier =

American football player

No. 25 – Ole Miss Rebels
- Position: Running back
- Class: Sophomore

Personal information
- Listed height: 5 ft 10 in (1.78 m)
- Listed weight: 218 lb (99 kg)

Career information
- High school: McKinney (McKinney, Texas)
- College: Michigan State (2024–2025); Ole Miss (2026–present)
- Stats at ESPN

Makhi Frazier is an American college football running back for the Ole Miss Rebels. He previously played for the Michigan State Spartans.

== Early life ==
Frazier attended McKinney High School in McKinney, Texas. He was a two-way player in high school, playing both running back and linebacker. Originally committed to Oregon State, Frazier flipped his commitment to play college football to Michigan State University, following head coach Jonathan Smith.

== College career ==
As a freshman, Frazier totaled seven carries for 21 yards. The following season, his playing time increased, rushing for 103 yards and a touchdown in his first career start against Western Michigan in the 2025 season opener. Frazier finished his sophomore campaign rushing for a team-leading 520 yards on 116 carries and two touchdowns. On November 30, 2025, he announced his decision to enter the transfer portal.

=== Statistics ===
College statistics
Season	Team	Games	Rushing				Receiving			
Season	Team	GP	Att	Yards	Avg	TD	Rec	Yards	Avg	TD
2024	Michigan State	9	7	21	3.0	0	1	12	12.0	0
2025	Michigan State	9	116	520	4.5	2	12	25	2.1	0
2026	Ole Miss	7	68	357	5.3	0	8	25	3.1	0
Career		25	191	898	4.7	2	21	62	3.0	0
