= Omari Kelly =

American football player (born 2003)

Profile
- Position: Wide receiver

Personal information
- Born: October 23, 2003 (age 23)
- Listed height: 6 ft 0 in (1.83 m)
- Listed weight: 190 lb (86 kg)

Career information
- High school: Hewitt-Trussville (Trussville, Alabama)
- College: Auburn (2022–2023); Middle Tennessee (2024); Michigan State (2025)
- NFL draft: 2026: undrafted

Career history
- Chicago Bears (2026)*
- * Offseason or practice squad member only

Awards and highlights
- First-team All-Conference USA (2024)

Omari Kelly (born October 23, 2003) is an American professional football wide receiver. Kelly played college football at Auburn from 2022 to 2023, Middle Tennessee in 2024, and Michigan State in 2025. Kelly signed with the Bears after going undrafted in the 2026 NFL draft.

== Early life ==
Omari Kelly was born on October 23, 2003, and was originally from Jesup, Georgia. He began playing flag football at the age of 3 before moving to tackle football. He lived with his mother, Kendra, and older brother, Demarcus, while growing up in Alabama.

== High school career ==
Kelly attended Hewitt-Trussville High School in Trussville, Alabama, where he played as a wide receiver beginning late in his sophomore year. In his junior year in 2020, Kelly caught 39 passes for 710 yards and seven touchdowns. In the leadup to his senior season, he was listed in the top 15 of 2022 senior recruits by AL.com, having received offers from several schools, including Alabama, Arizona State, Arkansas, Auburn, Cincinnati, Florida, Florida State, Georgia, Georgia Tech, Indiana, Kentucky, UCF, and Western Kentucky. Randy Kennedy of AL.com described Kelly as "a force on defense, offense, and special teams," adding that he "should develop into a receiver who can catch the ball in traffic as well as pose a deep threat."

== College career ==
In his first two years at Auburn, Kelly recorded five receptions for 101 yards in 19 games. Kelly announced he would enter the transfer portal on December 1, 2023.

In his 2024 season with Middle Tennessee, Kelly recorded 53 receptions for 869 yards and four touchdowns. He also returned a punt for a touchdown. At the end of the season, he earned first-team All-Conference USA honors.

Kelly transferred to Michigan State on December 15, 2024, and led the team in receiving in its first game against Western Michigan before catching the game-winning two-point conversion in the Spartans' second game against Boston College. Kelly finished second on the Spartans with 47 receptions and 626 receiving yards, with two receiving touchdowns. He was an All-Big Ten Conference honorable mention following the season.

== Professional career ==
Pre-draft measurables
Height	Weight	Arm length	Hand span	Wingspan	40-yard dash	10-yard split	20-yard split	20-yard shuttle	Three-cone drill	Vertical jump	Broad jump
5 ft 11.1 in (1.81 m)	190 lb (86 kg)	33 1/8 in (0.84 m)	9 in (0.23 m)	6 ft 6 1/8 in (1.98 m)	4.58 s	1.62 s	2.63 s	4.58 s	7.15 s	34 1/2 in (0.88 m)	9 ft 9 in (2.97 m)
All values from Pro Day

After going undrafted in the 2026 NFL draft, Kelly signed with the Chicago Bears as an undrafted free agent. He was waived by Chicago as a part of final roster cuts on August 30, 2026.
