= Nick Marsh (American football) =

American football player (born 2006)

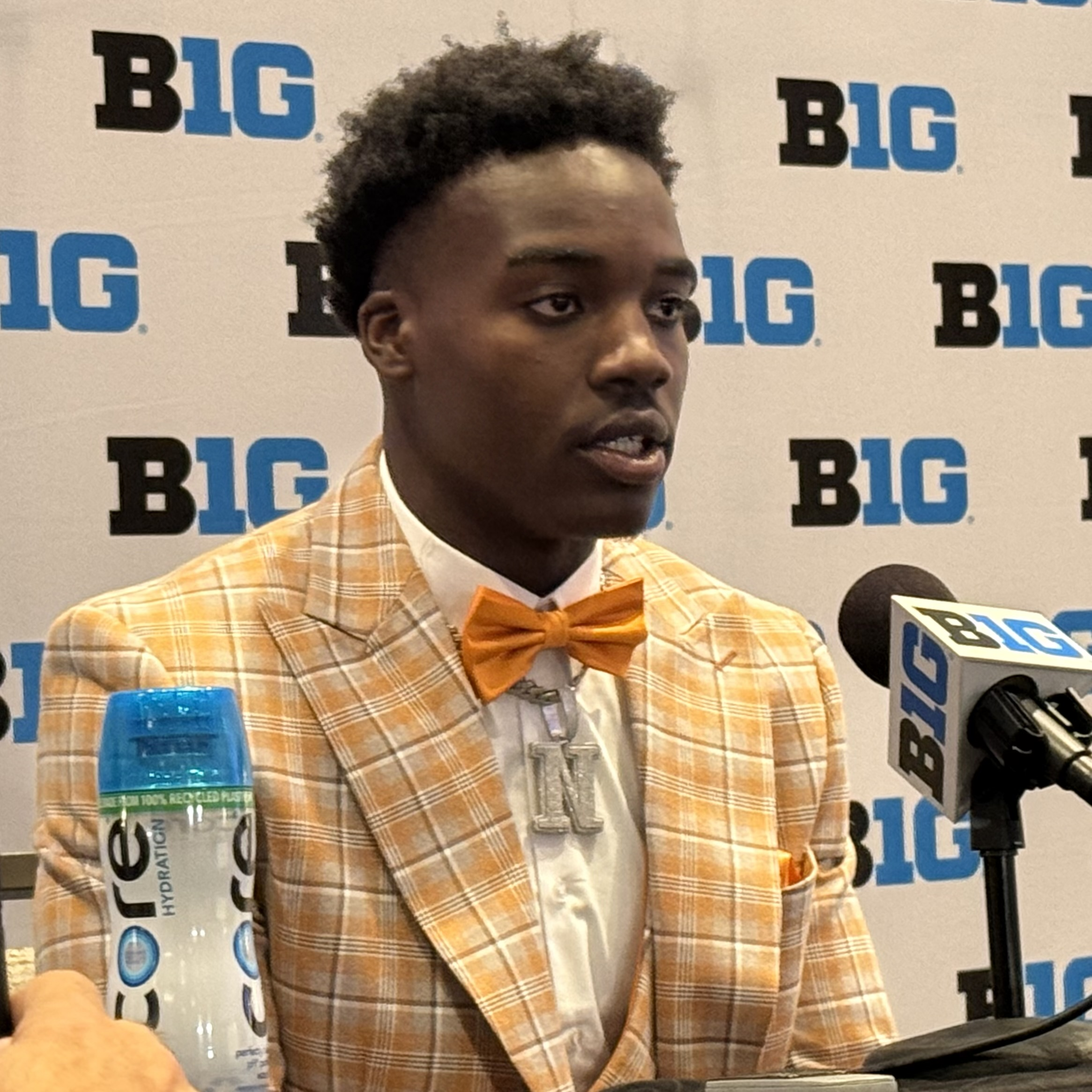
- Marsh at 2025 Big Ten Media Days

No. 11 – Indiana Hoosiers
- Position: Wide receiver
- Class: Junior

Personal information
- Born: October 1, 2006 (age 20)
- Listed height: 6 ft 3 in (1.91 m)
- Listed weight: 213 lb (97 kg)

Career information
- High school: River Rouge (River Rouge, Michigan)
- College: Michigan State (2024–2025); Indiana (2026–present)
- Stats at ESPN

Nick Marsh (born October 1, 2006) is an American college football wide receiver for the Indiana Hoosiers. He previously played for the Michigan State Spartans.

== Career ==
=== Michigan State ===
Marsh attended River Rouge High School in River Rouge, Michigan. As a senior, he had 41 receptions for 718 yards and eight touchdowns. Marsh played in the 2023 All-American Bowl. He committed to Michigan State University to play college football.

In his second career game his true freshman season at Michigan State in 2024, Marsh had eight receptions for 194 yards and a touchdown.

After Michigan State fired coach Jonathan Smith at the conclusion of the 2025 season, Marsh announced his intentions to enter the transfer portal after leading the Spartans in receiving in 2024 and 2025.

=== Indiana ===
On January 4, 2026 Marsh announced his commitment to the Indiana Hoosiers.

=== Statistics ===
| Year | Team | Games | | Receiving | | | | Rushing | | | |
| Year | Team | GP | GS | Rec | Yds | Avg | TD | Att | Yds | Avg | TD |
|---|---|---|---|---|---|---|---|---|---|---|---|
| 2024 | Michigan State | 11 | 8 | 41 | 649 | 15.8 | 3 | 4 | 23 | 5.8 | 0 |
| 2025 | Michigan State | 12 | 12 | 59 | 662 | 11.2 | 6 | 3 | 11 | 3.7 | 0 |
| 2026 | Indiana | – | – | – | – | – | – | – | – | – | – |
| Career | | 23 | 20 | 100 | 1,311 | 13.1 | 9 | 7 | 34 | 4.9 | 0 |
