= 2023 Minnesota Golden Gophers football team =

American college football season

2023 Minnesota Golden Gophers football

Quick Lane Bowl champion

Quick Lane Bowl, W 30–24 vs. Bowling Green
- Conference: Big Ten Conference
- Record: 6–7 (3–6 Big Ten)
- Head coach: P. J. Fleck (7th season)
- Co-offensive coordinators: Matt Simon (4th season); Greg Harbaugh Jr. (1st season)
- Offensive scheme: Multiple
- Defensive coordinator: Joe Rossi (6th season)
- Co-defensive coordinator: Nick Monroe (1st season)
- Base defense: 4–3
- Home stadium: Huntington Bank Stadium

2023 Big Ten Conference football standings
	Conf.			Overall
Team	W		L	W		L
East Division
No. 1 Michigan xy$#^	9	–	0	15	–	0
No. 10 Ohio State	8	–	1	11	–	2
No. 13 Penn State	7	–	2	10	–	3
Maryland	4	–	5	8	–	5
Rutgers	3	–	6	7	–	6
Indiana	1	–	8	3	–	9
Michigan State†	0	–	7	0	–	8
West Division
No. 24 Iowa xy	7	–	2	10	–	4
Northwestern	5	–	4	8	–	5
Wisconsin	5	–	4	7	–	6
Minnesota	3	–	6	6	–	7
Illinois	3	–	6	5	–	7
Nebraska	3	–	6	5	–	7
Purdue	3	–	6	4	–	8
Championship: Michigan 26, Iowa 0
# – College Football Playoff champion; ^ – College Football Playoff participant; $ – Conference champion; x – Division champion/co-champions; y – Championship game participant; † — NCAA vacated all wins for Michigan State (4–8, 2–7); Rankings from AP Poll

The 2023 Minnesota Golden Gophers football team represented the University of Minnesota in the West Division of the Big Ten Conference during the 2023 NCAA Division I FBS football season. The Golden Gophers were led by P. J. Fleck in his seventh year as head coach. They played their home games at Huntington Bank Stadium in Minneapolis. The team was originally ineligible for a bowl game due to a losing record; however, they were awarded a berth due to having the highest Academic Progress Rating among 5–7 teams.

== Schedule ==
Date	Time	Opponent	Site	TV	Result	Attendance
August 31	7:00 p.m.	Nebraska	Huntington Bank Stadium; Minneapolis, MN (rivalry)	FOX	W 13–10	53,629
September 9	6:30 p.m.	Eastern Michigan*	Huntington Bank Stadium; Minneapolis, MN	BTN	W 25–6	48,101
September 16	2:30 p.m.	at No. 20 North Carolina*	Kenan Memorial Stadium; Chapel Hill, NC	ESPN	L 13–31	45,151
September 23	6:30 p.m.	at Northwestern	Ryan Field; Evanston, IL	BTN	L 34–37 ^{OT}	20,148
September 30	11:00 a.m.	Louisiana*^{†}	Huntington Bank Stadium; Minneapolis, MN	BTN	W 35–24	46,843
October 7	6:30 p.m.	No. 2 Michigan	Huntington Bank Stadium; Minneapolis, MN (Little Brown Jug)	NBC	L 10–52	52,179
October 21	2:30 p.m.	at No. 24 Iowa	Kinnick Stadium; Iowa City, IA (rivalry)	NBC	W 12–10	69,250
October 28	2:30 p.m.	Michigan State	Huntington Bank Stadium; Minneapolis, MN	BTN	W 27–12	47,392
November 4	2:30 p.m.	Illinois	Huntington Bank Stadium; Minneapolis, MN	BTN	L 26–27	42,906
November 11	2:30 p.m.	at Purdue	Ross–Ade Stadium; West Lafayette, IN	NBC	L 30–49	59,049
November 18	3:00 p.m.	at No. 2 Ohio State	Ohio Stadium; Columbus, OH	BTN	L 3–37	104,019
November 25	2:30 p.m.	Wisconsin	Huntington Bank Stadium; Minneapolis, MN (rivalry)	FS1	L 14–28	48,119
December 26	1:00 p.m.	vs. Bowling Green*	Ford Field; Detroit, MI (Quick Lane Bowl)	ESPN	W 30–24	28,521
*Non-conference game; ^{†}Homecoming; Rankings from AP Poll (and CFP Rankings, from the date when issued) - Released prior to game; All times are in Central time; Source:

== Rankings ==
Ranking movements Legend: ██ Increase in ranking ██ Decrease in ranking — = Not ranked RV = Received votes
	Week															
Poll	Pre	1	2	3	4	5	6	7	8	9	10	11	12	13	14	Final
AP	RV	RV	RV	—	—	—	—	—	—	—	—	—	—	—	—	
Coaches	RV	RV	RV	—	—	—	—	—	—	—	—	—	—	—	—	
CFP	Not released									—	—	—	—	—	—	Not released

== Game summaries ==
=== Nebraska ===
Nebraska at Minnesota
Rivalry

Team	1	2	3	4	Total
Cornhuskers	0	0	7	3	10
• Golden Gophers	0	3	0	10	13

- Date: August 31
- Location:
  Huntington Bank Stadium
  Minneapolis, MN
- Game start: 7:05 pm CDT
- Elapsed time: 3:26
- Game attendance: 53,629
- Game weather: 79 °F (26 °C), Sunny, Wind SE 13 mph (21 km/h)
- Referee: Larry Smith
- TV announcers (FOX): Gus Johnson (play-by-play), Joel Klatt (analyst), and Jenny Taft (sideline)
- Source: Box Score

Scoring summary
2	12:31	Minn	Dragan Kesich 34-yard field goal	Minn 3–0
3	14:03	Neb	Alex Bullock 34-yard pass from Jeff Sims (Tristan Alvano kick)	Neb 7–3
4	12:42	Neb	Tristan Alvano 27-yard field goal	Neb 10–3
4	2:32	Minn	Daniel Jackson 13-yard pass from Athan Kaliakmanis (Dragan Kesich kick)	Tied 10–10
4	0:00	Minn	Dragan Kesich 47-yard field goal	Minn 13–10

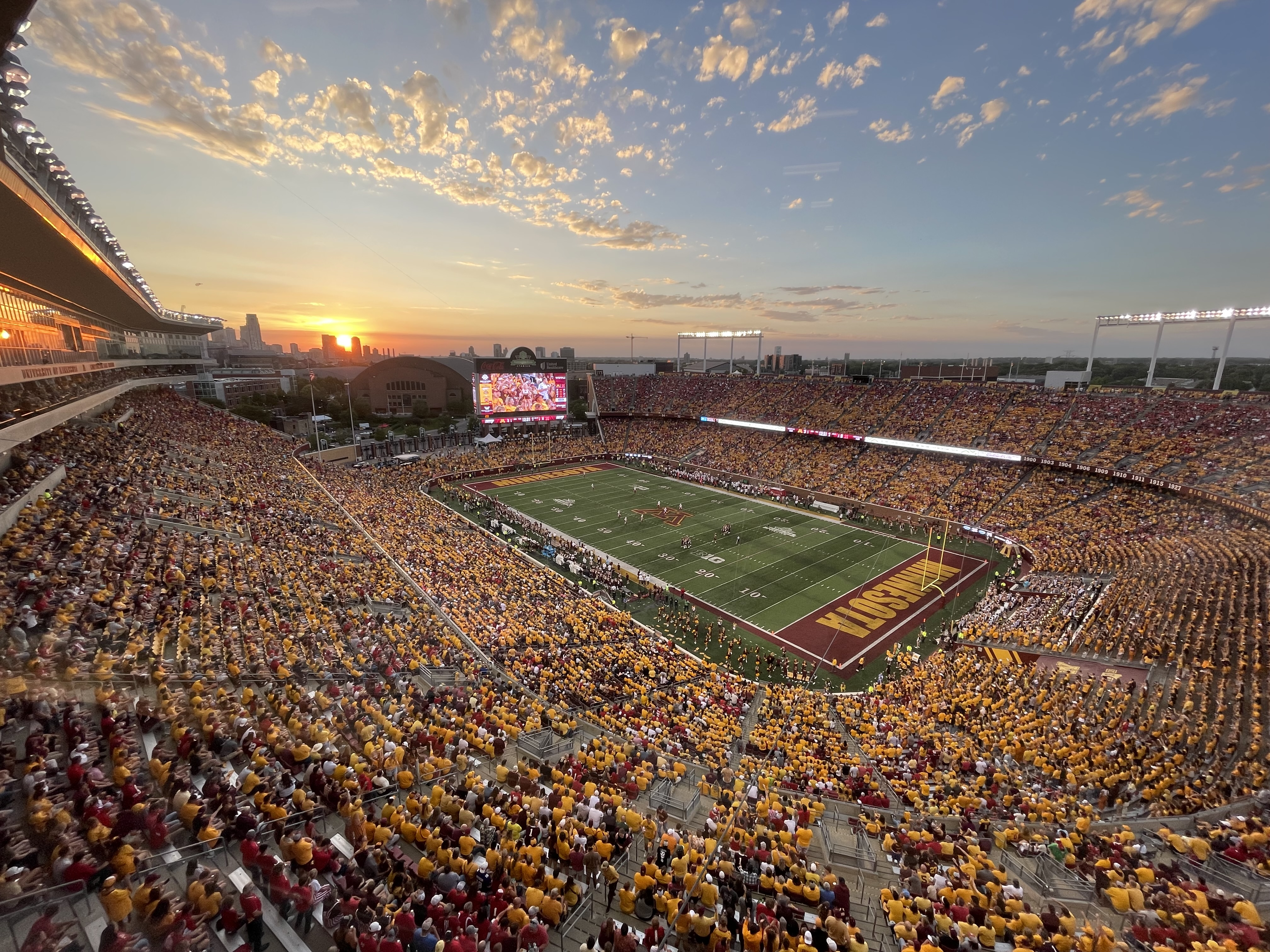
Sunset over a sold-out Huntington Bank Stadium for the season opener.

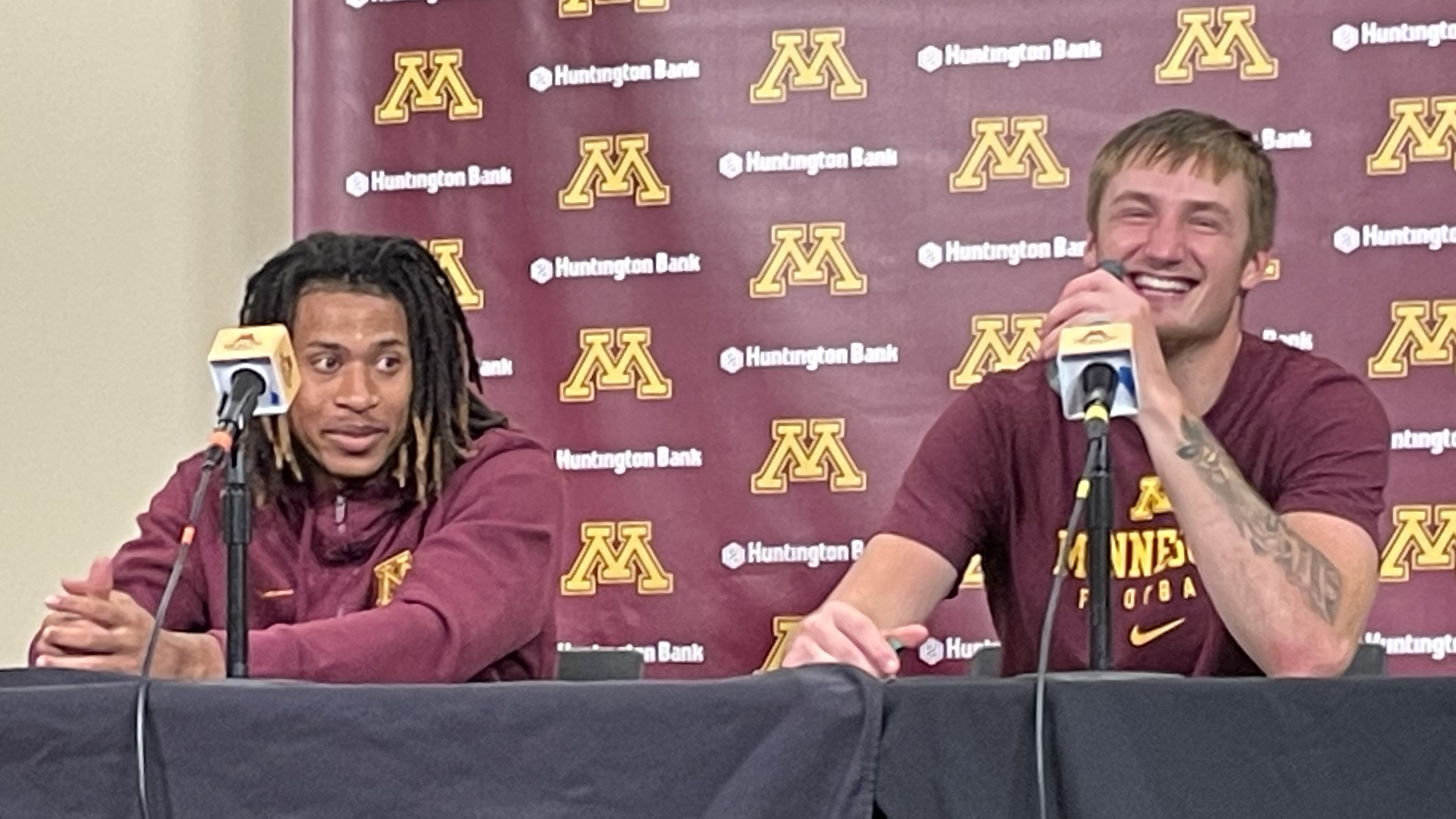
WR Daniel Jackson and QB Athan Kaliakmanis talk about Jackson's game-tying, toe-dragging touchdown catch in the 4th Quarter against Nebraska.

=== Eastern Michigan ===
Eastern Michigan at Minnesota

Team	1	2	3	4	Total
Eagles	0	6	0	0	6
• Golden Gophers	0	10	10	5	25

- Date: September 9
- Location:
  Huntington Bank Stadium
  Minneapolis, MN
- Game start: 6:40 pm CDT
- Elapsed time: 3:05
- Game attendance: 48,101
- Game weather: 69 °F (21 °C), Cloudy, Wind NW 11 mph (18 km/h)
- Referee: Mark Kluczynski
- TV announcers (BTN): Connor Onion (play-by-play), Tommy Olson (analyst), and Audrey Dahlgren (sideline)
- Source: Box Score

=== at No. 20 North Carolina ===
Minnesota at No. 20 North Carolina

Team	1	2	3	4	Total
Golden Gophers	0	10	3	0	13
• No. 20 Tar Heels	7	14	3	7	31

- Date: September 16
- Location:
  Kenan Memorial Stadium
  Chapel Hill, NC
- Game start: 3:35 pm EDT
- Elapsed time: 3:12
- Game attendance: 50,500
- Game weather: 85 °F (29 °C), Sunny, Wind W 4 mph (6.4 km/h)
- Referee: Riley Johnson
- TV announcers (ESPN): Beth Mowins (play-by-play), Kirk Morrison (analyst), and Stormy Buonantony (sideline)
- Source: Box Score

Scoring summary
1	11:47	UNC	Nate McCollum 46 yd. pass from Drake Maye (Noah Burnette kick) (9 plays, 75 yards, 3:13)	UNC 7–0
2	13:17	UNC	Omarion Hampton 1 yd. rush (Noah Burnette kick) (6 plays, 80 yards, 2:25)	UNC 14–0
2	9:47	MIN	Dragan Kesich 23 yd. field goal (7 plays, 11 yards, 2:29)	UNC 14–3
2	2:23	UNC	Bryson Nesbit 19 yd. pass from Drake Maye (Noah Burnette kick) (7 plays, 80 yards, 2:29)	UNC 21–3
2	0:30	MIN	Darius Taylor 2 yd. rush (Dragan Kesich kick) (7 plays, 75 yards, 1:53)	UNC 21–10
3	10:22	MIN	Dragan Kesich 42 yd. field goal (9 plays, 48 yards, 4:38)	UNC 21–13
3	1:26	UNC	Noah Burnette 42 yd. field goal (8 plays, 56 yards, 1:26)	UNC 24–13
4	5:00	UNC	British Brooks 1 yd. rush (Noah Burnette kick) (11 plays, 76 yards, 5:23)	UNC 31–13

=== at Northwestern ===
Minnesota at Northwestern

Team	1	2	3	4	Total
Golden Gophers	7	17	7	0	31
Wildcats	0	7	3	21	31

- Date: September 23
- Location:
  Ryan Field
  Evanston, IL
- Game start: 6:40 pm CDT
- Elapsed time: 3:39
- Game attendance: 20,148
- Game weather: 70 °F (21 °C), Clear, Wind E 9 mph (14 km/h)
- Referee: Tim O'Dey
- TV announcers (BTN): Lisa Byington (play-by-play), Anthony Herron (analyst), and Elise Menaker (sideline)
- Source: Box Score

=== Louisiana ===
Louisiana at Minnesota

Team	1	2	3	4	Total
Ragin' Cajuns	7	10	0	7	24
• Golden Gophers	7	7	7	14	35

- Date: September 30
- Location:
  Huntington Bank Stadium
  Minneapolis, MN
- Game start: 11:01 am CDT
- Elapsed time: 3:06
- Game attendance: 46,843
- Game weather: 76 °F (24 °C), Sunny
- Referee: Ron Snodgrass
- TV announcers (BTN): Chris Vosters (play-by-play), Brock Vereen (analyst), and Dannie Rogers (sideline)
- Source: Box Score

Scoring summary
1	10:36	LA	Peter LeBlanc 7-yard pass from Zeon Chriss (Kenneth Almendares kick) (10 plays, 75 yards, 4:24)	LA 7–0
1	02:30	MIN	Daniel Jackson 10-yard pass from Athan Kaliakmanis (Dragan Kesich kick) (9 plays, 86 yards, 5:03)	TIE 7–7
2	13:26	LA	Kenneth Almendares 28-yard field goal (7 plays, 64 yards, 4:04)	LA 10–7
2	07:21	MIN	Athan Kaliakmanis 2-yard rush (Dragan Kesich kick) (10 plays, 75 yards, 6:05)	MIN 14–10
2	01:47	LA	Robert Williams 6-yard pass from Zeon Chriss (Kenneth Almendares kick) (11 plays, 75 yards, 5:41)	LA 17–14
3	08:48	MIN	Zach Evans 18-yard rush (Dragan Kesich kick) (11 plays, 80 yards, 6:09)	MIN 21–17
4	13:45	MIN	Bryce Williams 2-yard rush (Dragan Kesich kick) (8 plays, 42 yards, 3:59)	MIN 28–17
4	05:21	MIN	Daniel Jackson 37-yard pass from Athan Kaliakmanis (Dragan Kesich kick) (7 plays, 56 yards, 4:30)	MIN 35–17
4	03:01	LA	Jacob Kibodi 52-yard rush (Kenneth Almendares kick) (6 plays, 75 yards, 2:20)	MIN 35–24

=== No. 2 Michigan ===
Michigan at Minnesota
Little Brown Jug

Team	1	2	3	4	Total
• No. 2 Wolverines	10	14	21	7	52
Golden Gophers	3	7	0	0	10

- Date: October 7
- Location:
  Huntington Bank Stadium
  Minneapolis, MN
- Game start: 6:35 pm CDT
- Elapsed time: 3:11
- Game attendance: 52,179
- Game weather: 49 °F (9 °C), Cloudy, Wind E 4 mph (6.4 km/h)
- Referee: Jerry McGinn
- TV announcers (NBC): Noah Eagle (play-by-play), Todd Blackledge (analyst), and Kathryn Tappen (sideline)
- Source: Box Score

Scoring summary
1	14:14	MICH	Will Johnson 35-yard interception return (James Turner kick)	MICH 7–0
1	7:33	MICH	James Turner 31-yard field goal	MICH 10–0
1	2:35	MINN	Dragan Kesich 54-yard field goal	MICH 10–3
2	10:08	MICH	Blake Corum 1-yard run (James Turner kick)	MICH 17–3
2	5:50	MICH	J. J. McCarthy 5-yard run (James Turner kick)	MICH 24–3
2	0:06	MINN	Daniel Jackson 35-yard pass from Athan Kaliakmanis (Dragan Kesich kick)	MICH 24–10
3	8:28	MICH	J. J. McCarthy 7-yard run (James Turner kick)	MICH 31–10
3	3:20	MICH	Colston Loveland 24-yard pass from J. J. McCarthy (James Turner kick)	MICH 38–10
3	1:43	MICH	Keon Sabb 29-yard interception return (James Turner kick)	MICH 45–10
4	9:21	MICH	Leon Franklin 2-yard run (James Turner kick)	MICH 52–10

=== at No. 24 Iowa ===
Minnesota at No. 24 Iowa
Floyd of Rosedale

Team	1	2	3	4	Total
• Golden Gophers	3	0	6	3	12
No. 24 Hawkeyes	3	7	0	0	10

- Date: October 21
- Location:
  Kinnick Stadium
  Iowa City, IA
- Game start: 2:33 pm CDT
- Elapsed time: 3:38
- Game attendance: 69,250
- Game weather: 67 °F (19 °C), Sunny, Wind NW 22 mph (35 km/h)
- Referee: Tim O'Dey
- TV announcers (NBC): Paul Burmeister (play-by-play), Anthony Herron (analyst), Zora Stephenson (sideline)
- Source: Box Score

Scoring summary
1	10:35	Iowa	Drew Stevens 23-yard field goal	Iowa 3–0
1	0:17	Minn	Dragan Kesich 43-yard field goal	Tied 3–3
2	0:49	Iowa	Deacon Hill 1-yard run (Drew Stevens kick)	Iowa 10–3
3	8:59	Minn	Dragan Kesich 44-yard field goal	Iowa 10–6
3	2:25	Minn	Dragan Kesich 28-yard field goal	Iowa 10–9
4	8:33	Minn	Dragan Kesich 31-yard field goal	Minn 12–10

=== Michigan State ===
Michigan State at Minnesota

Team	1	2	3	4	Total
Spartans	6	0	0	6	12
• Golden Gophers	0	10	0	17	27

- Date: October 28
- Location:
  Huntington Bank Stadium
  Minneapolis, MN
- Game start: 2:40 pm CDT
- Elapsed time: 3:10
- Game attendance: 47,392
- Game weather: 33 °F (1 °C), Cloudy, Wind W 8 mph (13 km/h)
- Referee: Chris Coyte
- TV announcers (BTN): Cory Provus (play-by-play), Jake Butt (analyst), and Brooke Fletcher (sideline)
- Source: Box Score

Scoring summary
1	13:19	MSU	Jonathan Kim 38-yard field goal (4 plays, 5 yards, 1:22)	MSU 3–0
1	9:49	MSU	Jonathan Kim 42-yard field goal (4 plays, 9 yards, 0:50)	MSU 6–0
2	4:54	UMN	Dragan Kesich 22-yard field goal (8 plays, 94 yards, 2:55)	MSU 6–3
2	0:19	UMN	Daniel Jackson 22-yard pass from Athan Kaliakmanis (Dragan Kesich kick) (8 plays, 94 yards, 2:55)	UMN 10–6
4	12:07	UMN	Jordan Nubin 18-yard run (Dragan Kesich kick) (9 plays, 87 yards, 5:25)	UMN 17–6
4	8:37	MSU	Tyell Henry 9-yard pass from Sam Leavitt (two-point conversion failed) (8 plays, 75 yards, 3:30)	UMN 17–12
4	4:11	UMN	Jordan Nubin 2-yard run (Dragan Kesich kick) (7 plays, 46 yards, 4:25)	UMN 24–12
4	3:25	UMN	Dragan Kesich 31-yard field goal (4 plays, 9 yards, 0:30)	UMN 27–12

=== Illinois ===
Illinois at Minnesota

Team	1	2	3	4	Total
• Fighting Illini	14	0	7	6	27
Golden Gophers	7	10	3	6	26

- Date: November 4
- Location:
  Huntington Bank Stadium
  Minneapolis, MN
- Game start: 2:45 pm CST
- Elapsed time: 3:08
- Game attendance: 42,906
- Game weather: 49 °F (9 °C), Sunny, Wind S 6 mph (9.7 km/h)
- Referee: Gregory Blum
- Source: Box Score

=== at Purdue ===
Minnesota at Purdue

Team	1	2	3	4	Total
Golden Gophers	10	10	0	10	30
• Boilermakers	14	14	7	14	49

- Date: November 11
- Location:
  Ross–Ade Stadium
  West Lafayette, IN
- Game start: 3:32 pm EST
- Elapsed time: 3:29
- Game attendance: 59,049
- Game weather: 52 °F (11 °C), Sunny, Wind E 4 mph (6.4 km/h)
- Referee: Jeffrey Servinski
- Source: Box Score

=== at Ohio State ===
Minnesota at Ohio State

Team	1	2	3	4	Total
Golden Gophers	0	0	0	3	3
• Buckeyes	7	6	17	7	37

- Date: November 18
- Location:
  Ohio Stadium
  Columbus, OH
- Game start: 4:01 pm EST
- Elapsed time: 2:55
- Game attendance: 104,019
- Game weather: 49 °F (9 °C), Sunny, Wind S 4 mph (6.4 km/h)
- Referee: Kole Knueppel
- TV announcers (BTN): Cory Provus (play-by-play), Jake Butt (analyst) and Brooke Fletcher (sideline reporter)
- Source: Box Score

Scoring summary
1	9:22	OSU	TreVeyon Henderson 9-yard run (Jayden Fielding kick) (8 plays, 85 yards, 4:02)	OSU 7–0
2	13:05	OSU	Jayden Fielding 47-yard field goal (9 plays, 58 yards, 2:46)	OSU 10–0
2	4:51	OSU	Jayden Fielding 26-yard field goal (11 plays, 81 yards, 4:24)	OSU 13–0
3	14:48	OSU	TreVeyon Henderson 75-yard run (Jayden Fielding kick) (1 play, 75 yards, 0:12)	OSU 20–0
3	13:53	OSU	Marvin Harrison Jr. 4-yard pass from Kyle McCord (Jayden Fielding kick) (3 plays, 6 yards, 0:43)	OSU 27–0
3	10:17	OSU	Jayden Fielding 32-yard field goal (5 plays, 15 yards, 1:13)	OSU 30–0
4	13:43	OSU	Cade Stover 1-yard pass from Kyle McCord (Jayden Fielding kick) (16 plays, 84 yards, 9:18)	OSU 37–0
4	6:43	MINN	Dragan Kesich 54-yard field goal (12 plays, 39 yards, 7:00)	OSU 37–3

=== Wisconsin ===
Wisconsin at Minnesota
Paul Bunyan's Axe

Team	1	2	3	4	Total
• Badgers	0	14	14	0	28
Golden Gophers	7	7	0	0	14

- Date: November 25
- Location:
  Huntington Bank Stadium
  Minneapolis, MN
- Game start: 2:40 pm CST
- Elapsed time: 3:07
- Game attendance: 48,119
- Game weather: 31 °F (−1 °C), Cloudy, Wind SW 9 mph (14 km/h)
- Referee: Larry Smith
- TV announcers (FS1): Jeff Levering (play-by-play) and Mark Helfrich (analyst)
- Source: Box Score

Scoring summary
1	12:21	MINN	Jordan Nubin 1-yard run (Dragan Kesich kick) (6 plays, 72 yards, 2:34)	MIN 7–0
2	13:04	WIS	Braelon Allen 5-yard run (Nathanial Vakos kick) (11 plays, 86 yards, 5:16)	TIED 7–7
2	4:30	MINN	Daniel Jackson 7-yard pass from Athan Kaliakmanis (Dragan Kesich kick) (11 plays, 71 yards, 5:36)	MIN 14–7
2	2:38	WIS	Will Pauling 11-yard pass from Tanner Mordecai (Nathanial Vakos kick) (4 plays, 75 yards, 1:52)	TIED 14–14
3	9:24	WIS	Braelon Allen 4-yard run (Nathanial Vakos kick) (2 plays, 54 yards, 0:25)	WIS 21–14
3	0:10	WIS	Riley Nowakowski 5-yard pass from Tanner Mordecai (Nathanial Vakos kick) (10 plays, 86 yards, 4:55)	WIS 28–14

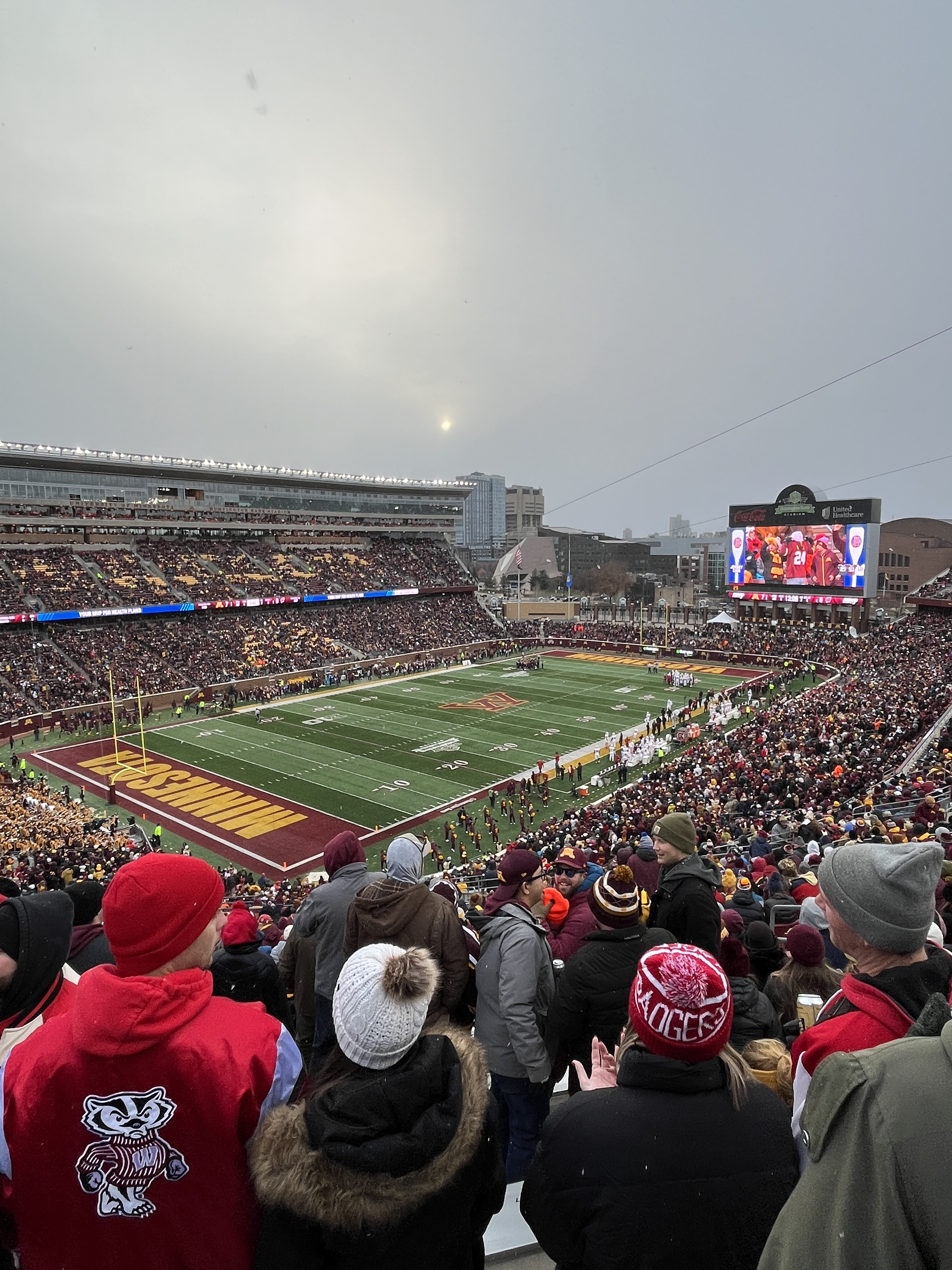

Despite the loss giving them an overall 5–7 record, the Golden Gophers would head to a bowl game due to their Academic Progress Rate.

=== vs. Bowling Green (Quick Lane Bowl) ===
Quick Lane Bowl: Bowling Green vs. Minnesota

Team	1	2	3	4	Total
Falcons	7	3	0	14	24
• Golden Gophers	6	3	14	7	30

- Date: December 26
- Location:
  Ford Field
  Detroit, Michigan
- Game start: 2:04 pm EST
- Elapsed time: 3:20
- Game attendance: 28,521
- Game weather: Indoor
- Referee: Tim Rich
- TV announcers (ESPN): Connor Onion (play-by-play), Dustin Fox (analyst), and Tori Petry (sideline)
- Source: Box Score

Scoring summary
1	13:47	BGSU	Odieu Hiliare 46-yard pass from Connor Bazelak (Alan Anaya kick) (3 plays, 75 yards, 1:13)	BGSU 7–0
1	5:56	MINN	Elijah Spencer 4-yard pass from Cole Kramer (two-point run conversion failed) (13 plays, 75 yards, 7:51)	BGSU 7–6
2	8:57	MINN	Dragan Kesich 31-yard field goal (7 plays, 42 yards, 2:58)	MINN 9–7
2	1:38	BGSU	Alan Anaya 33-yard field goal (4 plays, 0 yards, 1:02)	BGSU 10–9
3	9:20	MINN	Cole Kramer 1-yard run (Dragan Kesich kick) (11 plays, 78 yards, 5:40)	MINN 16–10
3	4:18	MINN	Jameson Geers 7-yard pass from Cole Kramer (Dragan Keisch kick) (6 plays, 27 yards, 3:31)	MINN 23–10
4	11:10	BGSU	PaSean Wimberly 18-yard run (Alan Anaya kick) (7 plays, 80 yards, 3:29)	MINN 23–17
4	8:03	MINN	Darius Taylor 17-yard run (Dragan Kesich kick) (5 plays, 48 yards, 3:07)	MINN 30–17
4	2:33	BGSU	Connor Bazelak 2-yard run (Alan Anaya kick) (14 plays, 75 yards, 5:30)	MINN 30–24

== Roster ==
2023 Minnesota Golden Gophers football team roster
Players
Coaches
Offense

Pos.	#	Name	Class
WR	0	Le'Meke Brockington	So
RB	1	Darius Taylor	Fr
RB	2	Sean Tyler	Sr
WR	4	Corey Crooms Jr.	Sr
WR	7	Chris Autman-Bell	GS
QB	8	Athan Kaliakmanis	So
WR	9	Daniel Jackson	Sr
WR	11	Elijah Spencer	Jr
QB	12	Cole Kramer	Sr
WR	13	Kristen Hoskins	Fr
WR	14	Evan Redding	Fr
WR	15	Kenric Lanier II	Fr
WR	17	Cade Conzemius	Fr
QB	18	Drew Viotto	Fr
RB	21	Bryce Williams (injured)	GS
RB	26	Zach Evans	Fr
WR	28	Zach Jorgensen	Fr
RB	30	Jordan Nubin	So
RB	33	Max Grand	Fr
OL	50	J. J. Guedet	Sr
OL	52	Spencer Alvarez	Fr
OL	55	Karter Shaw	GS
OL	58	Jackson Hunter	So
OL	59	Tony Nelson	Fr
OL	60	Phillip Daniels	Fr
OL	65	Greg Johnson	Fr
OL	66	Nathan Boe	GS
OL	67	De'Eric Mister	Fr
OL	68	Jackson Ruschmeyer (injured)	Jr
OL	69	Aireontae Ersery	Jr
OL	70	Cade McConnell	Fr
OL	71	Martes Lewis	Jr
OL	73	Tyrell Lawrence	Jr
OL	75	Tyler Cooper	Sr
OL	76	Reese Tripp	Fr
OL	77	Quinn Carroll	GS
OL	78	Ashton Beers	Fr
OL	79	Logan Purcell	So
WR	80	Dino Kaliakmanis	So
WR	81	Quentin Redding	So
TE	82	Wyatt Schroeder	Sr
TE	84	Jack DiSano	Fr
TE	85	Frank Bierman	Jr
TE	86	Jameson Geers	So
TE	87	Nick Kallerup	Sr
TE	88	Brevyn Spann-Ford	GS
TE	89	Nathan Jones	Fr

Defense

Pos.	#	Name	Class
DL	0	Anthony Smith	Fr
DB	5	Justin Walley	Jr
LB	6	Maverick Baranowski	Fr
DL	8	Darnell Jefferies (injured)	GS
LB	9	Devon Williams	So
DL	11	Karter Menz	Fr
DB	12	Darius Green	So
DL	13	Chris Collins	GS
DB	14	Kerry Brown	Fr
DB	16	Coleman Bryson	Fr
DL	17	Jah Joyner	Jr
DB	18	Rhyland Kelly	Fr
LB	19	Joey Gerlach	Fr
DB	20	Jack Henderson	Sr
DB	23	Garrison Monroe	Fr
DB	24	Tariq Watson	Fr
DB	26	Victor Pless	Jr
DB	27	Tyler Nubin	GS
DL	28	Colton Gregersen	Fr
DB	31	Jordan Greenhow	So
LB	33	Ryan Selig	GS
LB	34	Jack Tinnen	Fr
LB	35	Derik LeCaptain (injured)	Sr
LB	41	Cade Larson	Fr
DL	42	Jack Hawkinson	So
LB	43	Eli Mau	So
LB	44	Tyler Stolsky	Fr
LB	45	Cody Lindenberg	Jr
LB	46	Lucas Finnessy	Sr
DL	47	Hayden Schwartz	Fr
DL	52	Luther McCoy	So
DL	62	Jacob Schuster	So
DL	87	Martin Owusu	Fr
DL	89	Nate Becker	So
DL	91	Deven Eastern	So
DL	92	Danny Striggow	Sr
DL	93	Kyler Baugh	GS
DL	96	Logan Richter	Sr
DL	97	Jalen Logan-Redding	Jr

Special teams

Pos.	#	Name	Class
P	36	Ryan Shamburger	Jr
LS	37	Brady Weeks	GS
K	48	Jacob Lewis	Jr
P	96	Mark Crawford	Sr
K	99	Dragan Kesich	Sr

Head coach

- P. J. Fleck (head coach)

Coordinators/assistant coaches

- Greg Harbaugh Jr. (co-offensive coordinator / quarterbacks)
- Matt Simon (co-offensive coordinator / wide receivers)
- Joe Rossi (defensive coordinator / linebackers)
- Nick Monroe (co-defensive coordinator / cornerbacks)
- Rob Wenger (special teams coordinator / defensive ends)
- Danny Collins (safeties / pass game coordinator)
- Brian Callahan (run game coordinator / offensive line)
- Winston DeLattiboudere (defensive line)
- Nic McKissic-Luke (running backs)
- Andrew Sowder (tight ends)
- Gerrit Chernoff (general manager)
- Dan Nichol (head strength & conditioning)
- Norries Wilson (director of player development)
- Eric Koehler (offensive analyst)
- Mariano Sori-Marin (defensive analyst)

Legend

- (C) Team captain
- (S) Suspended
- (I) Ineligible
- Injured
- Redshirt

Roster
Last update: November 6, 2023
