= 2026 Minnesota Golden Gophers football team =

American college football season

2026 Minnesota Golden Gophers football
- Conference: Big Ten Conference
- Record: 6–5 (4–4 Big Ten)
- Head coach: P. J. Fleck (10th season)
- Offensive coordinator: Greg Harbaugh Jr. (4th season; first ten games); Eric Koehler (interim; remainder of season)
- Offensive scheme: Pro-style
- Defensive coordinator: Danny Collins (2nd season)
- Co-defensive coordinator: Nick Monroe (4th season)
- Base defense: 4–2–5
- Home stadium: Huntington Bank Stadium

2026 Big Ten Conference football standings
	Conf.			Overall
Team	W		L	W		L
No. 4 UCLA	7	–	1	10	–	1
No. 8 Indiana	6	–	1	9	–	1
No. 13 Oregon	6	–	2	8	–	3
No. 15 Iowa	5	–	2	8	–	2
No. 14 Ohio State	5	–	3	7	–	4
Wisconsin	5	–	3	7	–	4
No. 18 USC	4	–	3	7	–	3
Illinois	4	–	3	6	–	4
Nebraska	4	–	4	7	–	4
Minnesota	4	–	4	6	–	5
Penn State	3	–	4	6	–	4
Washington	3	–	4	6	–	4
Michigan	3	–	5	6	–	5
Northwestern	3	–	5	6	–	5
Maryland	2	–	5	4	–	6
Purdue	2	–	6	3	–	8
Rutgers	1	–	6	2	–	8
Michigan State	1	–	7	3	–	8
Championship: December 5, 2026
^ – College Football Playoff participant; $ – Conference champion; y – Championship game participant; As of November 22, 2026; Rankings from CFP rankings

The 2026 Minnesota Golden Gophers football team represents the University of Minnesota as a member of the Big Ten Conference during the 2026 NCAA Division I FBS football season. The Golden Gophers are led by their tenth-year head coach P. J. Fleck. They play their home games at Huntington Bank Stadium located in Minneapolis.

Their Week 5 home win against longtime rival Michigan for the Little Brown Jug marked their first home win against them since 1977.

For the first time since 2020, Minnesota would make its appearance on College Gameday in week 9, when the Gophers traveled to face the defending National Champions, the Indiana Hoosiers.

Offensive coordinator Greg Harbaugh Jr. was fired after a Week 11 road loss to Penn State. Tight ends coach Eric Koehler was named interim offensive coordinator for the rest of the season.

== Schedule ==
Date	Time	Opponent	Site	TV	Result	Attendance	Source
September 3	7:00 p.m.	Eastern Illinois*	Huntington Bank Stadium; Minneapolis, MN	NBCSN/Peacock	W 59–7	41,048	
September 12	2:30 p.m.	Mississippi State*	Huntington Bank Stadium; Minneapolis, MN	CBS	L 13–38	48,048	
September 19	11:00 a.m.	Akron*	Huntington Bank Stadium; Minneapolis, MN	BTN	W 41–7	40,168	
September 26	10:00 p.m.	at Washington	Husky Stadium; Seattle, WA	FOX	W 27–24	63,323	
October 3	11:00 a.m.	Michigan	Huntington Bank Stadium; Minneapolis, MN (Little Brown Jug, Big Noon Kickoff)	FOX	W 20–14	51,012	
October 10	7:00 p.m.	at Purdue	Ross–Ade Stadium; West Lafayette, IN	BTN	L 13–41	48,559	
October 24	2:30 p.m.	No. 15 Iowa^{†}	Huntington Bank Stadium; Minneapolis, MN (Floyd of Rosedale)	FS1	W 13–10	53,004	
October 31	2:30 p.m.	at No. 4 Indiana	Memorial Stadium; Bloomington, IN (College GameDay)	CBS	L 16–23 ^{OT}	54,400	
November 7	11:00 a.m.	No. 8 UCLA	Huntington Bank Stadium; Minneapolis, MN	FOX	L 20–34	43,841	
November 14	6:00 p.m.	at Penn State	Beaver Stadium; University Park, PA (Governor's Victory Bell)	FS1	L 14–42	105,291	
November 21	11:00 a.m.	Northwestern	Huntington Bank Stadium; Minneapolis, MN	FS1	W 20–17	39,371	
November 27	6:30 p.m.	at Wisconsin	Camp Randall Stadium; Madison, WI (Paul Bunyan's Axe)	NBC			
*Non-conference game; ^{†}Homecoming; Rankings from AP Poll (and CFP Rankings, after November 3) – Released prior to game; All times are in Central time; Source:

== Offseason ==
Positions key
Offense	Defense	Special teams
QB — Quarterback; RB — Running back; FB — Fullback; WR — Wide receiver; TE — Tight end; OL — Offensive lineman; T — Tackle; G — Guard; C — Center	DL — Defensive lineman; DT — Defensive tackle (Note: Includes nose tackle (NT)); DE — Defensive end; EDGE — Edge rusher; LB — Linebacker (Note: Includes middle linebacker (MLB/MIKE), weakside linebacker (WILL), strongside linebacker (SAM), off-ball linebacker, and outside linebacker (OLB)); DB — Defensive back; CB — Cornerback; S — Safety (Note: Includes free safety (FS) and strong safety (SS))	K — Kicker (Note: Also known as a placekicker (PK)); P — Punter; LS — Long snapper; RS — Return specialist (Note: Includes kickoff and punt returners)

=== Coaching staff changes ===
==== Departures ====
Name	Position	New team	New position
Jayden Everett	Running backs coach	Wisconsin	Running backs coach
Bob Ligashesky	Special teams coordinator	Wisconsin	Special teams coordinator

==== Additions ====
Name	Position	Previous team	Previous position
Daniel Da Prato	Special teams coordinator	New Mexico	Special teams coordinator
Isaac Fruechte	Wide receivers coach	North Dakota	Offensive coordinator/Quarterbacks coach
Mohamed Ibrahim	Running backs coach	Kent State	Running backs coach

=== Entered NFL draft ===
Player	Position	Round	Pick	Drafted by
Deven Eastern	DT	7	242	Seattle Seahawks

=== Transfer portal ===
==== Outgoing ====
2026 Minnesota Golden Gophers outgoing transfers
Name	No.	Pos.	Height	Weight	Year	Hometown	New school	Ref.
Ethan Carrier	#29	S	6'1	175	Junior	Detroit Lakes, MN	South Dakota	
Legend Lyons	#7	WR	6'1	190	Freshman	Covina, CA		
Cristian Driver	#4	WR	5'11	192	Senior	Flower Mound, TX	Montana	
David Kemp	#98	K	5'9	170	(redshirt) Senior	Jacksonville, FL	Kennesaw State	
Brody Richter	#25	P	6'3	205	Junior	Scottsdale, AZ	New Mexico State	
Jaylen Bowden	#5	CB	6'2	165	Junior	Charlotte, NC	East Carolina	
Za'Quan Bryan	#4	CB	5'11	179	Junior	Savannah, GA	South Florida	
Ohifame Ijeboi	#3	RB	6'0	190	Sophomore	Philadelphia, PA	Purdue	
Steven Curtis	#8	DL	6'5	230	Junior	West Palm Beach, FL	North Texas	
Tre Berry	#22	RB	6'0	189	Freshman	Montgomery, AL	Tennessee State	
Malachi Coleman	#16	WR	6'4	210	(redshirt) Sophomore	Lincoln, NE	Wisconsin	
Koi Perich	#3	S	6'1	200	Sophomore	Esko, MN	Oregon	
Reese Tripp	#76	OT	6'7	315	Junior	Kasson, MN	Middle Tennessee	
Kahlee Tafai	#71	IOL	6'6	300	(redshirt) Sophomore	Lawndale, CA	California	
Kenric Lanier II	#15	WR	6'4	180	Junior	Decatur, GA	Missouri	
Jackson Kollock	#12	QB	6'3.5	220	Freshman	Laguna Beach, CA	UC Davis	
Caleb McGrath	#95	P	6'2	190	Sophomore	Saint Paul, MN	North Dakota State	
Quentin Redding	#81	WR	5'7	155	(redshirt) Senior	Menomonee Falls, WI	Rutgers	
Drew Wilson	#30	LB	6'0	225	(redshirt) Sophomore	Mequon, WI	Lafayette	
Johann Cardenas	#-	RB	6'0	223	Sophomore	Katy, TX		
Harrison Brun	#33	S	6'1	205	(redshirt) Freshman	Buffalo, MN	South Dakota	

==== Incoming ====
2026 Minnesota Golden Gophers incoming transfers
Name	No.	Pos.	Height	Weight	Year	Hometown	Prev. school	Ref.
Michael Merdinger	#12	QB	6'1.5	195	Sophomore	Deerfield Beach, FL	Liberty	
Jaron Thomas	#22	RB	6'0	200	Freshman	Elkhart, IN	Purdue	
Bennett Warren	#68	OT	6'7.5	325	(redshirt) Freshman	Sugar Land, TX	Tennessee	
Andrew Marshall	#29	LB	6'3	220	Junior	Carroll, OH	Eastern Michigan	
Parker Knutson	#20	S	6'1	190	(redshirt) Sophomore	Sartell, MN	Southwest Minnesota State	
Naquan Crowder	#70	DL	6'3	320	Junior	Aliquippa, PA	Marshall	
Perry Thompson	#3	WR	6'3	205	Sophomore	Foley, AL	Auburn	
Zachary Robbins	#37	P	6'3	220	Freshman	Payson, UT	Utah State	
Aydan West	#5	CB	6'0	180	Freshman	Gaithersburg, MD	Michigan State	
Elisha West	#26	DB	5'10	195	Sophomore	Germantown, MD	Michigan State	
Beckham Sunderland	#92	K	6'1	201	Sophomore	Newport, KY	Michigan	
Mekhai Smith	#22	S	6'2	210	Sophomore	Lower Merion, PA	Lehigh	
TJ Bush Jr.	#3	EDGE	6'3	250	Junior	Woodbridge, VA	California	
Kaden Helms	#87	TE	6'4.5	220	(redshirt) Junior	Bellevue, NE	Oklahoma	
Noah Jennings	#13	WR	6'1	175	Junior	Bellevue, NE	Cincinnati	
Zion Steptoe	#25	WR	5'11	171	(redshirt) Junior	Frisco, TX	Tulsa	
Xion Chapman	#90	DL	6'5	280	Sophomore	Allentown, PA	FIU	
TJ Thomas	#23	RB	5'8	190	Sophomore	Thomasville, GA	Elon	
Sid Kaba	#92	DL	6'3	260	(redshirt) Sophomore	Columbus, OH	Marshall	
Luke Drzewiecki	#12	K	6'0	171	Senior	Detroit, MI	New Mexico	

==== Team departures ====
2026 Minnesota Golden Gophers departures
Name	No.	Pos.	Height	Weight	Year	Hometown	Reason
Le'Meke Brockington	#0	WR	6'0	195	(redshirt) Senior	Moultrie, GA	Graduated
Emmett Morehead	#9	QB	6'6	235	Fifth Year	Woodside, CA	Graduated
Devon Williams	#9	LB	6'1	230	(redshirt) Senior	Dublin, OH	Graduated
Darius Green	#12	DB	6'0	210	(redshirt) Senior	Covington, GA	Graduated
Rushawn Lawrence	#16	DL	6'2	270	Sixth Year	Philadelphia, PA	Graduated
Logan Loya	#17	WR	5'11	190	Sixth Year	Garden Grove, CA	Graduated
Jeff Roberson	#20	LB	6'2	230	Sixth Year	Choctaw, OK	Graduated
Evan Redding	#22	DB	5'10	185	(redshirt) Junior	Menomonee Falls, WI	Not rostered (Note: He does not appear in the official roster anymore.)
Cam Davis	#23	RB	6'1	215	Graduate Student	Upland, CA	Graduated
Jai'Onte' McMillan	#24	DB	5'10	190	Sixth Year	Atlanta, GA	Graduated
Sam Henson	#30	K	6'1	200	Graduate Student	Owatonna, MN	Graduated
Derik LeCaptain	#35	LB	6'2	235	Graduate Student	Gardner, WI	Graduated
Frank Bierman	#44	TE	6'4	250	Sixth Year	Tipton, IA	Graduated
Lucas Finnessy	#46	DL	6'3	255	Sixth Year	Pewaukee, WI	Graduated
Mo Omonode	#50	DL	6'0	285	Senior	West Lafayette, IN	Graduated
Spencer Alvarez	#52	OL	6'6	290	(redshirt) Junior	Columbia Heights, MN	Graduated
Aluma Nkele	#70	OL	6'6	380	(redshirt) Senior	Gardena, CA	Graduated
Dylan Ray	#73	OL	6'6	320	Fifth Year	Noblesville, IN	Graduated
Marcellus Marshall	#74	OL	6'6	330	Sixth Year	Morgantown, WV	Graduated
Jack DiSano	#84	TE	6'3	245	(redshirt) Junior	Glenview, IL	Not rostered
Jameson Geers	#86	TE	6'5	250	(redshirt) Senior	Channahon, IL	Graduated
Drew Biber	#87	TE	6'4	245	(redshirt) Senior	Cedarburg, WI	Graduated
Nate Becker	#89	DL	6'6	300	(redshirt) Senior	Maple Grove, MN	Graduated
Deven Eastern	#91	DL	6'6	320	(redshirt) Senior	Shakopee, MN	Graduated
Luke Ryerse	#91	P	6'1	220	Freshman	Woodbury, MN	Not rostered
Brady Denaburg	#92	K	5'11	195	Senior	Merritt Island, FL	Graduated
Jalen Logan-Redding	#97	DL	6'4	295	Sixth Year	Columbia, MS	Graduated

== Game summaries ==
=== vs Eastern Illinois (FCS) ===
Eastern Illinois Panthers (FCS) (1–0) at Minnesota Golden Gophers (0–0) – Game summary

Quarter	1	2	3	4	Total
Panthers (FCS)	0	7	0	0	7
Golden Gophers	14	21	10	14	59

at Huntington Bank Stadium • Minneapolis, Minnesota

- Date: September 3
- Game time: 7:00 p.m. CST
- Game weather: Sunny • Temperature: 83 °F (28 °C) • Wind: SE 9 mph
- Game attendance: 41,048
- Referee: Kole Knueppel
- TV announcers (Peacock/NBCSN): Jason Benetti, Yogi Roth, and Ashley ShahAhmadi

Game information

First quarter

- MINN – Darius Taylor 1-yard run (Daniel Jackson kick), 4:29. Golden Gophers 7–0. Drive: 9 plays, 51 yards, 5:46.
- MINN – Javon Tracy 87-yard punt return (Daniel Jackson kick), 2:14. Golden Gophers 14–0.

Second quarter

- MINN – Darius Taylor 27-yard run (Daniel Jackson kick), 14:20. Golden Gophers 21–0. Drive: 3 plays, 66 yards, 1:11.
- EIU – Tyren Buggs 8-yard pass from Cole LaCrue (Drew Schiller kick), 9:00. Golden Gophers 21–7. Drive: 11 plays, 75 yards, 5:20.
- MINN – Darius Taylor 3-yard run (Daniel Jackson kick), 3:15. Golden Gophers 28–7. Drive: 9 plays, 73 yards, 5:41.
- MINN – Pierce Walsh 1-yard pass from Drake Lindsey (Daniel Jackson kick), 0:06. Golden Gophers 35–7. Drive: 10 plays, 53 yards, 1:37.

Third quarter

- MINN – Javon Tracy 69-yard punt return (Daniel Jackson kick), 13:26. Golden Gophers 42–7.
- MINN – Daniel Jackson 31-yard field goal, 3:17. Golden Gophers 45–7. Drive: 7 plays, 45 yards, 3:49.

Fourth quarter

- MINN – Max Shikenjanksi 2-yard run (Daniel Jackson kick), 12:29. Golden Gophers 52–7. Drive: 7 plays, 52 yards, 3:44.
- MINN – Xavier Ford 1-yard run (Beckham Sunderland kick), 0:25. Golden Gophers 59–7. Drive: 9 plays, 34 yards, 3:46.

Statistics	EIU	MINN
First downs	4	24
Plays–yards	43–110	71–495
Rushes–yards	28–51	38–147
Passing yards	59	348
Passing: comp–att–int	9–15–0	26–33–0
Turnovers	0	1
Time of possession	23:39	36:21

Team	Category	Player	Statistics
Eastern Illinois	Passing	Cole LaCrue	7/12, 51 yards, TD
Eastern Illinois	Rushing	Cole LaCrue	5 carries, 22 yards
Eastern Illinois	Receiving	Tyren Buggs	2 receptions, 38 yards, TD
Minnesota	Passing	Drake Lindsey	19/24, 264 yards, TD
Minnesota	Rushing	Darius Taylor	14 carries, 56 yards, 3 TD
Minnesota	Receiving	Javon Tracy	5 receptions, 98 yards

=== vs Mississippi State ===
Mississippi State Bulldogs (1–0) at Minnesota Golden Gophers (1–0) – Game summary

Quarter	1	2	3	4	Total
Bulldogs	14	14	3	7	38
Golden Gophers	3	3	7	0	13

at Huntington Bank Stadium • Minneapolis, Minnesota

- Date: September 12
- Game time: 2:30 p.m. CST
- Game weather: Sunny • Temperature: 73 °F (23 °C) • Wind: NW 11 mph
- Game attendance: 48,048
- Referee: Steve Marlowe
- TV announcers (CBS): Brad Nessler, Charles Davis, and Jenny Dell

Game information

First quarter

- MSST – Zion Ragins 22-yard pass from Kamario Taylor (Kyle Ferrie kick), 13:12. Bulldogs 7–0. Drive: 5 plays, 75 yards, 1:48.
- MINN – Luke Drzewiecki 44-yard field goal, 2:58. Bulldogs 7–3. Drive: 16 plays, 58 yards, 10:11.
- MSST – Fluff Bothwell 5-yard run (Kyle Ferrie kick), 0:22. Bulldogs 14–3. Drive: 9 plays, 75 yards, 2:36.

Second quarter

- MSST – Sanfrisco Magee 30-yard pass from Kamario Taylor (Kyle Ferrie kick), 11:27. Bulldogs 21–3. Drive: 7 plays, 72 yards, 2:38.
- MSST – Anthony Evans III 15-yard pass from Kamario Taylor (Kyle Ferrie kick), 4:32. Bulldogs 28–3. Drive: 12 plays, 76 yards, 5:03.
- MINN – Luke Drzewiecki 41-yard field goal, 0:00. Bulldogs 28–6. Drive: 11 plays, 52 yards, 4:32.

Third quarter

- MINN – Aydan West 0-yard fumble recover (Luke Drzewiecki kick), 11:01. Bulldogs 28–13.
- MSST – Kyle Ferrie 52-yard field goal, 9:53. Bulldogs 31–13. Drive: 6 plays, 41 yards, 1:08.

Fourth quarter

- MSST – Fluff Bothwell 3-yard run (Kyle Ferrie kick), 12:32. Bulldogs 38–13. Drive: 10 plays, 96 yards, 4:58.

Statistics	MSST	MINN
First downs	28	18
Plays–yards	68–479	63–292
Rushes–yards	46–252	15–13
Passing yards	227	279
Passing: comp–att–int	16–22–0	31–48–0
Turnovers	1	0
Time of possession	30:15	29:45

Team	Category	Player	Statistics
Mississippi State	Passing	Kamario Taylor	16/22, 227 yards, 3 TD
Mississippi State	Rushing	Fluff Bothwell	18 carries, 103 yards, 2 TD
Mississippi State	Receiving	Anthony Evans III	7 receptions, 121 yards, TD
Minnesota	Passing	Drake Lindsey	31/48, 279 yards
Minnesota	Rushing	Darius Taylor	6 carries, 15 yards
Minnesota	Receiving	Noah Jennings	7 receptions, 88 yards

=== vs Akron ===
Akron Zips (1–1) at Minnesota Golden Gophers (1–1) – Game summary

Quarter	1	2	3	4	Total
Zips	0	0	0	7	7
Golden Gophers	10	10	7	14	41

at Huntington Bank Stadium • Minneapolis, Minnesota

- Date: September 19
- Game time: 11:00 a.m. CST
- Game weather: Cloudy • Temperature: 60 °F (16 °C) • Wind: NE at 7 miles per hour (11 km/h)
- Game attendance: 40,168
- Referee: Mark Kluczynski
- TV announcers (BTN): Joe Beninati, Tanner Morgan and Anna Connelly

Statistics	AKR	MINN
First downs	16	20
Plays–yards	60–221	64–395
Rushes–yards	21–48	33–191
Passing yards	173	204
Passing: comp–att–int	21–39–0	17–31–1
Turnovers	2	1
Time of possession	25:56	34:04

Team	Category	Player	Statistics
Akron	Passing	Brayden Roggow	12/25, 131 yards
Akron	Rushing	Cibastian Broughton	3 carries, 17 yards
Akron	Receiving	Gentz Hillburn	3 receptions, 49 yards
Minnesota	Passing	Drake Lindsey	17/31, 204 yards, 3 TD, INT
Minnesota	Rushing	TJ Thomas	13 carries, 122 yards, TD
Minnesota	Receiving	Javon Tracy	5 receptions, 91 yards

=== at Washington ===
Minnesota Golden Gophers (2–1) at Washington Huskies (3–0) – Game summary

Quarter	1	2	3	4	Total
Golden Gophers	14	7	3	3	27
Huskies	0	10	0	14	24

at Husky Stadium • Seattle, Washington

- Date: September 26
- Game time: 10:00 p.m. CST
- Game weather: Clear • Temperature: 56 °F (13 °C) • Wind: NNW at 6 miles per hour (9.7 km/h)
- Game attendance: 63,323
- Referee: Kole Knueppel
- TV announcers (FOX): Jack Kizer (play-by-play) and Mark Helfrich (analyst)

Game information

First quarter
Second quarter
Third quarter
Fourth quarter

Statistics	MINN	WASH
First downs	18	16
Plays–yards	62–329	55–279
Rushes–yards	33–125	27–40
Passing yards	204	239
Passing: comp–att–int	21–29–1	18–28–2
Turnovers	1	2
Time of possession	36:01	23:59

Team	Category	Player	Statistics
Minnesota	Passing	Drake Lindsey	21/29, 204 yards, 3 TD, INT
Minnesota	Rushing	TJ Thomas	11 carries, 78 yards
Minnesota	Receiving	Noah Jennings	4 receptions, 58 yards
Washington	Passing	Demond Williams Jr.	18/28, 239 yards, 2 TD, 2 INT
Washington	Rushing	Brian Bonner	7 carries, 23 yards
Washington	Receiving	Dezmen Roebuck	7 receptions, 87 yards, TD

=== vs Michigan (Little Brown Jug) ===
Michigan Wolverines (3–1) at Minnesota Golden Gophers (3–1) – Game summary

Quarter	1	2	3	4	Total
Wolverines	0	14	0	0	14
Golden Gophers	7	0	3	10	20

at Huntington Bank Stadium • Minneapolis, Minnesota

- Date: October 3
- Game time: 11:00 a.m. CST
- Game weather: 60 °F (16 °C), sunny, NW 13 miles per hour (21 km/h)
- Game attendance: 51,012
- Referee: Francisco Villar
- TV announcers (FOX): Gus Johnson, Joel Klatt, and Jenny Taft

Game information

First quarter

- (7:29) MIN ― Darius Taylor 2-yard run, Luke Drzewiecki kick (Drive: 7 plays, 80 yards, 4:26; Minnesota 7–0)

Second quarter

- (13:46) MICH ― Jordan Marshall 5-yard run, Trey Butkowski kick (Drive: 5 plays, 34 yards, 2:02; Tied 7–7)
- (2:48) MICH ― Nathaniel Staehling 79-yard interception, Trey Butkowski kick (Michigan 14–7)

Third quarter

- (5:46) MIN ― Luke Drzewiecki 31-yard field goal (Drive: 4 plays, 4 yards, 1:36; Michigan 14–10)

Fourth quarter

- (14:58) MIN ― Luke Drzewiecki 26-yard field goal (Drive: 8 plays, 34 yards, 5:01; Michigan 14–13)
- (13:44) MIN ― Darius Taylor 3-yard pass from Drake Lindsey, Luke Drzewiecki kick (Drive: 3 plays, 35 yards, 1:07; Minnesota 20–14)

Statistics	MICH	MINN
First downs	11	17
Plays–yards	49–180	65–262
Rushes–yards	28–79	40–126
Passing yards	101	136
Passing: comp–att–int	10–21–2	17–25–2
Turnovers	3	2
Time of possession	22:24	37:36

Team	Category	Player	Statistics
Michigan	Passing	Bryce Underwood	10/21, 101 yards, 2 INT
Michigan	Rushing	Jordan Marshall	10 carries, 50 yards, TD
Michigan	Receiving	JJ Buchanan	4 receptions, 50 yards
Minnesota	Passing	Drake Lindsey	17/25, 136 yards, TD, 2 INT
Minnesota	Rushing	TJ Thomas	12 carries, 56 yards
Minnesota	Receiving	Noah Jennings	7 receptions, 70 yards

=== at Purdue ===
Minnesota Golden Gophers (4–1) at Purdue Boilermakers (2–3) – Game summary

Quarter	1	2	3	4	Total
Golden Gophers	0	3	10	0	13
Boilermakers	10	10	7	14	41

at Ross–Ade Stadium • West Lafayette, Indiana

- Date: October 10
- Game time: 7:00 p.m. CST
- Game weather: Cloudy • Temperature: 67 °F (19 °C) • Wind: E at 6 miles per hour (9.7 km/h)
- Game attendance: 48,559
- Referee: Gregory Blum
- TV announcers (BTN): Wayne Randazzo (play-by-play), Rhett Lewis (analyst), and Caroline Hendershot (sideline)

Game information
First quarter
- PUR – Jacobo Echeverria Lozano 45-yard field goal, 12:53. Boilermakers 3–0. Drive: 6 plays, 41 yards, 2:00.
- PUR – George Burhenn 15-yard pass from Ryan Browne (Jacobo Echeverria Lozano kick), 2:26. Boilermakers 10–0. Drive: 14 plays, 98 yards, 7:55.

Second quarter

- MINN – Luke Drzewiecki 49-yard field goal, 10:48. Boilermakers 10–3. Drive: 7 plays, 29 yards, 2:42.
- PUR – Jacobo Echeverria Lozano 28-yard field goal, 7:38. Boilermakers 13–3. Drive: 9 plays, 65 yards, 3:10.
- PUR – Fame Ijeboi 3-yard run (Jacobo Echeverria Lozano kick), 1:55. Boilermakers 20–3. Drive: 7 plays, 92 yards, 4:09.

Third quarter

- PUR – Fame Ijeboi 1-yard run (Jacobo Echeverria Lozano kick), 9:33. Boilermakers 27–3. Drive: 7 plays, 69 yards, 3:11.
- MINN – Luke Drzewiecki 37-yard field goal, 4:45. Boilermakers 27–6. Drive: 12 plays, 57 yards, 4:48.
- MINN – Jalen Smith 42-yard pass from Drake Lindsey (Luke Drzewiecki kick), 3:11. Boilermakers 27–13. Drive: 3 plays, 5 yards, 0:22.

Fourth quarter

- PUR – Ryan Browne 12-yard run (Jacobo Echeverria Lozano kick), 13:17. Boilermakers 34–13. Drive: 9 plays, 75 yards, 4:54.
- PUR – Fame Ijeboi 1-yard run (Jacobo Echeverria Lozano kick), 7:35. Boilermakers 41–13. Drive: 4 plays, 10 yards, 2:24.

Statistics	MINN	PUR
First downs	10	27
Plays–yards	52–275	71–464
Rushes–yards	13–27	47–305
Passing yards	248	159
Passing: comp–att–int	22–39–1	14–24–0
Turnovers	2	0
Time of possession	22:53	37:07

Team	Category	Player	Statistics
Minnesota	Passing	Drake Lindsey	22/39, 248 yards, TD, INT
Minnesota	Rushing	Darius Taylor	7 carries, 15 yards
Minnesota	Receiving	Jalen Smith	3 receptions, 89 yards, TD
Purdue	Passing	Ryan Browne	14/24, 159 yards, TD
Purdue	Rushing	Fame Ijeboi	31 carries, 195 yards, 3 TD
Purdue	Receiving	De'Nylon Morrissette	2 receptions, 51 yards

=== vs No. 15 Iowa (Floyd of Rosedale) ===
No. 15 Iowa Hawkeyes (5–1) at Minnesota Golden Gophers (4–2) – Game summary

Quarter	1	2	3	4	Total
No. 15 Hawkeyes	0	3	0	7	10
Golden Gophers	3	0	7	3	13

at Huntington Bank Stadium • Minneapolis, Minnesota

- Date: October 24
- Game time: 2:30 p.m. CST
- Game weather: Cloudy • Temperature: 74 °F (23 °C) • Wind: NE at 9 miles per hour (14 km/h)
- Game attendance: 53,004
- Referee: Kole Knueppel
- TV announcers (FS1): Tim Brando, Devin Gardner, and Josh Sims

Game information

First quarter

- 12:14 MINN – Luke Drzewiecki 31-yard field goal (Drive: 4 plays, 1 yard, 1:27; Minnesota 3–0)

Second quarter

- 6:49 IOWA – Caden Buhr 32-field goal (Drive: 4 plays, –3 yards, 1:41; Tied 3–3)

Third quarter

- 8:08 MINN – Darius Taylor 1-yard run (Luke Drzewiecki kick) (Drive: 10 plays, 71 yards, 6:46; Minnesota 10–3)

Fourth quarter

- 3:46 IOWA – Reece Vander Zee 37-yard pass from Hank Brown (Caden Buhr kick) (Drive: 4 plays, 98 yards, 1:58; Tied 10–10)
- 0:00 MINN – Luke Drzewiecki 46-yard field goal (Drive: 7 plays, 44 yards, 1:46; Minnesota 13–10)

Statistics	IOWA	MINN
First downs	16	11
Plays–yards	67–288	62–209
Rushes–yards	30–90	35–72
Passing yards	198	137
Passing: comp–att–int	20–37–3	14–27–1
Turnovers	4	1
Time of possession	31:07	28:53

Team	Category	Player	Statistics
Iowa	Passing	Hank Brown	11/21, 136 yards, TD, 2 INT
Iowa	Rushing	L. J. Phillips Jr.	7 carries, 25 yards
Iowa	Receiving	Reece Vander Zee	4 receptions, 69 yards, TD
Minnesota	Passing	Drake Lindsey	14/26, 137 yards, INT
Minnesota	Rushing	Xavier Ford	8 carries, 33 yards
Minnesota	Receiving	Javon Tracy	7 receptions, 45 yards

=== at No. 4 Indiana ===
Minnesota Golden Gophers (5–2) at No. 4 Indiana Hoosiers (7–1) – Game summary

Quarter	1	2	3	4	OT	Total
Golden Gophers	3	7	0	6	0	16
No. 4 Hoosiers	7	0	3	6	7	23

at Memorial Stadium • Bloomington, Indiana

- Date: October 31
- Game time: 2:30 p.m. CST
- Game attendance: 54,400
- TV announcers (CBS): Brad Nessler, Charles Davis, and Jenny Dell

Game information

First quarter
Second quarter
Third quarter
Fourth quarter

Statistics	MINN	IU
First downs	10	21
Plays–yards	60–215	69–419
Rushes–yards	23–95	33–144
Passing yards	120	275
Passing: comp–att–int	20–37–0	17–36–1
Turnovers	1	1
Time of possession	28:27	31:33

Team	Category	Player	Statistics
Minnesota	Passing	Drake Lindsey	20/37, 120 yards, 1 TD
Minnesota	Rushing	TJ Thomas	6 carries, 54 yards
Minnesota	Receiving	Javon Tracy	7 receptions, 40 yards
Indiana	Passing	Grant Wilson	9/17, 156 yards, 1 TD
Indiana	Rushing	Lee Beebe Jr.	15 carries, 84 yards
Indiana	Receiving	Charlie Becker	8 receptions, 149 yards, 1 TD

=== vs No. 8 UCLA ===
No. 8 UCLA Bruins (8–0) at Minnesota Golden Gophers (5–3) – Game summary

Quarter	1	2	3	4	Total
No. 8 Bruins	10	0	7	17	34
Golden Gophers	0	10	0	10	20

at Huntington Bank Stadium • Minneapolis, Minnesota

- Date: November 7
- Game time: 11:00 a.m.
- Game weather: Sunny • Temperature: 44 °F (7 °C) • Wind: NE at 9 miles per hour (14 km/h)
- Game attendance: 43,841
- Referee: Mark Kluczynski
- TV announcers (FOX): Gus Johnson, Joel Klatt, and Jenny Dell

Game information

First quarter
Second quarter
Third quarter
Fourth quarter

Statistics	UCLA	MINN
First downs	15	14
Plays–yards	55–466	66–296
Rushes–yards	39–163	29–91
Passing yards	303	205
Passing: comp–att–int	8–16–1	19–37–1
Turnovers	2	1
Time of possession	27:08	32:52

Team	Category	Player	Statistics
UCLA	Passing	Ty Dieffenbach	8/16, 303 yards, 3 TD
UCLA	Rushing	Wayne Knight	18 carries, 109 yards, 1 TD
UCLA	Receiving	Aidan Mizell	2 receptions, 150 yards, 2 TD
Minnesota	Passing	Drake Lindsey	19/37, 205 yards, 1 TD, 1 INT
Minnesota	Rushing	Darius Taylor	14 carries, 46 yards, 1 TD
Minnesota	Receiving	Jalen Smith	5 receptions, 85 yards

=== at Penn State (Governor's Victory Bell) ===
Minnesota Golden Gophers (5–4) at Penn State Nittany Lions (5–4) – Game summary

Quarter	1	2	3	4	Total
Golden Gophers	0	0	14	0	14
Nittany Lions	14	14	7	7	42

at Beaver Stadium • University Park, Pennsylvania

- Date: November 14
- Game time: 7:00 p.m.
- Game weather: Rain
- Game attendance: 105,291
- Referee: Francisco Villar
- TV announcers (FS1): Dan Hellie (play-by-play) and Robert Smith (analyst)

Game information

First quarter

- PSU – Rocco Becht, 1-yard TD run, Ryan Barker kick, 8:44 (7–0 PSU)
- PSU – Benjamin Brahmer, 19-yard TD pass from Becht, Barker kick, 5:15 (14–0 PSU)

Second quarter

- PSU – Carson Hansen, 46-yards TD run, Barker kick, 10:10 (21–0 PSU)
- PSU – Cam Wallace, 1-yard TD pass from Becht, Barker kick, 0:33 (28–0 PSU)

Third quarter

- PSU – Brahmer, 4-yard TD pass from Becht, Barker kick, 8:33 (35–0 PSU)
- UM – Javon Tracy, 10-yard TD pass from Drake Lindsey, Luke Drzewiecki kick, 6:14 (35–7 PSU)
- UM – Tracy, 15-yard TD pass from Lindsey, Drzewiecki kick, 1:40 (35–14 PSU)

Fourth quarter

- PSU –James Peoples, 22-yard TD pass from Alex Manske, Barker kick 2:51 (42–14 PSU)

Statistics	MINN	PSU
First downs	14	16
Plays–yards	57–226	58–351
Rushes–yards	27–41	41–229
Passing yards	185	122
Passing: comp–att–int	16–30–0	11–17–0
Turnovers	1	0
Time of possession	27:30	32:30

Team	Category	Player	Statistics
Minnesota	Passing	Drake Lindsey	16/30, 185 yards, 2 TD
Minnesota	Rushing	Darius Taylor	13 carries, 32 yards
Minnesota	Receiving	Darius Taylor	4 receptions, 85 yards
Penn State	Passing	Rocco Becht	9/15, 84 yards, 3 TD
Penn State	Rushing	Carson Hansen	12 carries, 126 yards, 1 TD
Penn State	Receiving	Andrew Rappleyea	4 receptions, 45 yards

=== vs Northwestern ===
Northwestern Wildcats (6–4) at Minnesota Golden Gophers (5–5) – Game summary

Quarter	1	2	3	4	Total
Wildcats	0	0	0	0	0
Golden Gophers	0	0	0	0	0

at Huntington Bank Stadium • Minneapolis, Minnesota

- Date: November 21

Game information

First quarter
Second quarter
Third quarter
Fourth quarter

Statistics	NU	MINN
First downs		
Plays–yards		
Rushes–yards		
Passing yards		
Passing: comp–att–int		
Turnovers		
Time of possession		

Team	Category	Player	Statistics
Northwestern	Passing		
Northwestern	Rushing		
Northwestern	Receiving		
Minnesota	Passing		
Minnesota	Rushing		
Minnesota	Receiving		

=== at Wisconsin (Paul Bunyan's Axe) ===
Minnesota Golden Gophers (0–0) at Wisconsin Badgers (0–0) – Game summary

Quarter	1	2	3	4	Total
Golden Gophers	0	0	0	0	0
Badgers	0	0	0	0	0

at Camp Randall Stadium • Madison, Wisconsin

- Date: November 27
- Game time: 6:30 p.m. CST
- TV announcers (NBC): TBD

Statistics	MINN	WIS
First downs		
Plays–yards		
Rushes–yards		
Passing yards		
Passing: comp–att–int		
Turnovers		
Time of possession		

Team	Category	Player	Statistics
Minnesota	Passing		
Minnesota	Rushing		
Minnesota	Receiving		
Wisconsin	Passing		
Wisconsin	Rushing		
Wisconsin	Receiving		

== Personnel ==
=== Coaching staff ===
Name	Position	Consecutive season in current position
P. J. Fleck	Head coach	10th
Greg Harbaugh Jr.	Offensive coordinator/Quarterbacks coach	4th
Danny Collins	Defensive coordinator/Safeties coach	2nd/5th
Nick Monroe	Co-defensive coordinator/Cornerbacks coach	4th
Daniel Da Prato	Special teams coordinator	1st
Mohamed Ibrahim	Running backs coach	1st
Isaac Fruechte	Wide receivers coach	1st
Eric Koehler	Tight ends coach	3rd
Brian Callahan	Offensive line coach	9th
C. J. Robbins	Defensive line coach	1st
Mariano Sori-Marin	Linebackers coach	2nd

=== Roster ===
2026 Minnesota Golden Gophers football team roster
Players
Coaches
Offense

Pos.	#	Name	Class
RB	1	Darius Taylor	Sr
RB	2	A.J. Turner	Sr
WR	3	Perry Thompson	Jr
TE	4	Roman Voss	Fr
QB	5	Drake Lindsey	So
QB	6	Max Shikenjanski	Jr
WR	7	Bradley Martino	So
WR	8	Jalen Smith	So
RB	9	Xavier Ford	So
WR	11	Javon Tracy	Sr
QB	12	Michael Merdinger	Jr
WR	13	Noah Jennings	Sr
QB	14	Dylan Wittke	Jr
QB	15	Owen Lansu	Fr
QB	16	Brady Palmer	Fr
WR	18	Donielle Hayes	Jr
TE	19	Pierce Walsh	Jr
RB	20	Ryan Estrada	Fr
RB	21	Grant Washington	So
RB	22	Jaron Thomas	So
RB	23	TJ Thomas	Jr
WR	24	Braiden Stevens	Fr
WR	25	Zion Steptoe	GS
RB	26	Zeke Bates	Fr
RB	28	Niko Castillo	Fr
TE	44	George Rohl	Fr
OL	50	Nathan Roy	So
OL	51	Daniel Shipp	So
OL	55	Jerome Williams	Jr
OL	56	Brett Carroll	So
OL	57	Aaron Thomas	Fr
OL	58	Jaden Ball	So
OL	59	Tony Nelson	Sr
OL	60	Kaveon Lee	So
OL	65	Greg Johnson	Sr
OL	66	Beckett Schreiber	Fr
OL	68	Bennett Warren	Jr
OL	69	Gavin Meier	Fr
OL	71	Lucas Tielsch	Fr
OL	75	Mark Handy	So
OL	77	Nick Spence	So
OL	78	Ashton Beers	Sr
OL	79	Andrew Trout	Fr
WR	81	Josiah Dozier	Fr
TE	82	Julian Johnson	So
TE	83	Sam Peters	Jr
WR	84	Hayden Moore	Fr
WR	85	Rico Blassingame	Fr
TE	86	Gabe Weaver	Fr
TE	87	Kaden Helms	Sr
TE	88	Jacob Simpson	So
WR	89	Quayd Hendryx	Fr

Defense

Pos.	#	Name	Class
DL	0	Anthony Smith	Sr
DL	1	Jaxon Howard	Jr
LB	2	Emmanuel Karmo	So
DL	3	TJ Bush Jr.	Sr
DB	4	Zack Harden	So
DB	5	Aydan West	So
LB	6	Maverick Baranowski	Sr
DB	7	Aidan Gousby	Sr
DB	8	Mike Gerald	So
DB	9	Garrison Monroe	Jr
DL	11	Karter Menz	Jr
DB	13	Zahir Rainer	So
DB	14	Kerry Brown	Jr
DB	15	Samuel Madu	So
LB	16	Hudson Dunn	Fr
DB	17	John Nestor	Sr
DB	18	Rhyland Kelly	Sr
LB	19	Joey Gerlach	Sr
DB	20	Parker Knutson	Sr
DB	21	Naiim Parrish	So
DB	22	Mekhai Smith	Jr
DB	23	Lamont Hamilton	Fr
DB	24	Chance Payne	Fr
DB	25	Justin Hopkins	Fr
DB	26	Elisha West	Jr
DB	27	Simon Seidl	So
DB	28	Trason Richardson	Fr
LB	29	Andrew Marshall	Sr
DB	31	Jordan Lampkins	Fr
LB	32	Angel Luciano	Fr
DL	33	Rhett Hlavacka	So
LB	35	Nate Cleveland	So
DB	36	Tavian White	Fr
DL	41	Anthony Charles	Fr
LB	44	Ethan Stendel	So
DL	45	Sam Macy	So
LB	46	Mason Carrier	So
DL	47	Enoch Atewogbola	So
DL	48	Aaden Aytch	Fr
LB	49	Matt Kingsbury	Jr
DL	55	Jaylin Hicks	So
DL	56	Jay'Quan Stubbs	So
DL	70	Naquan Crowder	Sr
DL	88	Josiah Anyansi	Fr
DL	90	Xion Chapman	Sr
DL	91	Howie Johnson	Fr
DL	92	Sid Kaba	Sr
DL	93	Riley Sunram	So
DL	94	Mo Saine	So
DL	95	Colin Hansen	So
DL	96	Abu Tarawallie	So
DL	97	Jeremiah Benson	Fr
DL	98	Adam Kissayi	So
DL	99	Theorin Randle	Jr

Special teams

Pos.	#	Name	Class
K	12	Luke Drzewiecki	5th
K	36	Daniel Jackson	So
P	37	Zachary Robbins	So
P	42	Tom Weston	Jr
LS	52	Alan Soukup	Jr
LS	53	Jakob Lutz	So
K	92	Beckham Sunderland	Sr

Head coach

- P. J. Fleck

Coordinators/assistant coaches

- Greg Harbaugh Jr. (offensive coordinator / quarterbacks)
- Danny Collins (defensive coordinator / safeties)
- Nick Monroe (co-defensive coordinator / cornerbacks)
- Brian Callahan (run game coordinator / offensive line)
- Eric Koehler (tight ends)
- Mariano Sori-Marin (linebackers)
- C.J. Robbins (defensive line)
- Isaac Fruechte (wide receivers)
- Mohamed Ibrahim (running backs)
- Steve Stanard (rush ends)
- Daniel Da Prato (special teams coordinator)
- Matt Limegrover (assistant offensive line)
- Keegan O'Hara (assistant quarterbacks)
- Nick Faus (assistant wide receivers)
- Travis Moore (assistant defensive line)
- Christian Pawola (assistant defensive backs)
- Bryan Nardo (senior defensive assistant)
- Brian Sheehan (senior offensive assistant / game management)
- Mike Shula (offensive assistant)
- Caleb Richardson (offensive line assistant)
- Micah Strahan (special teams assistant)
- Kody Schutzman (defensive quality control)
- Brandon Bostick (offensive analyst)
- Karter Johnson (offensive analyst)
- Mike Scott (offensive analyst)
- Gerrit Chernoff (general manager)
- Dan Nichol (head strength & conditioning)
- Norries Wilson (director of player development)

Legend

- (C) Team captain
- (S) Suspended
- (I) Ineligible
- Injured
- Redshirt

Roster
Last update: November 9, 2026
