= 2026 Michigan State Spartans football team =

American college football season

2026 Michigan State Spartans football
- Conference: Big Ten Conference
- Record: 3–8 (1–7 Big Ten)
- Head coach: Pat Fitzgerald (1st season)
- Offensive coordinator: Nick Sheridan (1st season)
- Offensive scheme: Pro spread
- Defensive coordinator: Joe Rossi (3rd season)
- Co-defensive coordinator: Max Bullough (1st season)
- Base defense: Multiple 4–2–5
- Home stadium: Spartan Stadium

2026 Big Ten Conference football standings
	Conf.			Overall
Team	W		L	W		L
No. 4 UCLA	7	–	0	10	–	0
No. 8 Indiana	6	–	1	9	–	1
No. 13 Oregon	6	–	2	8	–	3
No. 15 Iowa	5	–	2	8	–	2
No. 14 Ohio State	5	–	3	7	–	4
Wisconsin	5	–	3	7	–	4
No. 18 USC	4	–	3	7	–	3
Illinois	4	–	3	6	–	4
Nebraska	4	–	4	7	–	4
Minnesota	4	–	4	6	–	5
Penn State	3	–	4	6	–	4
Washington	3	–	4	6	–	4
Northwestern	3	–	5	6	–	5
Maryland	2	–	5	4	–	6
Michigan	2	–	5	5	–	5
Purdue	2	–	6	3	–	8
Rutgers	1	–	6	2	–	8
Michigan State	1	–	7	3	–	8
Championship: December 5, 2026
^ – College Football Playoff participant; $ – Conference champion; y – Championship game participant; As of November 21, 2026; Rankings from CFP rankings

The 2026 Michigan State Spartans football team represents Michigan State University as a member of the Big Ten Conference during the 2026 NCAA Division I FBS football season. The Spartans play their home games at Spartan Stadium located in East Lansing, Michigan, and are led by first-year head coach Pat Fitzgerald.

== Offseason ==
=== Coaching changes ===
Following the conclusion of the 2025 season, the school fired head coach Jonathan Smith after two seasons. On December 1, 2025, the school named former Northwestern head coach Pat Fitzgerald the team's new coach. Fitzgerald retained defensive coordinator Joe Rossi, receivers coach Courtney Hawkins, safeties coach James Adams, and tight ends coach Brian Wozniak. Former MSU linebacker Max Bullough was hired as a co-defensive coordinator/linebackers coach and LeVar Woods was named special teams coach.

== Schedule ==
Date	Time	Opponent	Site	TV	Result	Attendance
September 4	8:00 p.m.	Toledo*	Spartan Stadium; East Lansing, MI	FS1	W 30–20	72,083
September 12	3:30 p.m.	Eastern Michigan*	Spartan Stadium; East Lansing, MI	BTN	W 35–7	70,712
September 19	7:30 p.m.	at No. 3 Notre Dame*	Notre Dame Stadium; South Bend, IN (Megaphone Trophy)	NBC	L 10–27	77,622
September 26	5:00 p.m.	Nebraska	Spartan Stadium; East Lansing, MI	BTN	L 13–31	68,161
October 3	12:30 p.m.	at Wisconsin	Camp Randall Stadium; Madison, WI	BTN	L 3–31	67,001
October 10	3:30 p.m.	Illinois^{†}	Spartan Stadium; East Lansing, MI	FS1	L 37–38 ^{OT}	65,837
October 17	12:00 p.m.	No. 25 Northwestern	Spartan Stadium; East Lansing, MI	NBCSN/Peacock	L 21–24	67,423
October 24	3:30 p.m.	at No. 9 UCLA	Rose Bowl; Pasadena, CA	CBS	L 10–28	33,757
November 7	7:30 p.m.	at Michigan	Michigan Stadium; Ann Arbor, MI (Paul Bunyan Trophy)	NBCSN/Peacock	W 15–6	111,172
November 14	5:30 p.m.	Washington	Spartan Stadium; East Lansing, MI	BTN	L 14–21	60,275
November 20	8:00 p.m.	No. 13 Oregon	Spartan Stadium; East Lansing, MI	FOX	L 7–45	61,331
November 28	4:15 p.m.	at Rutgers	SHI Stadium; Piscataway, NJ	BTN		
*Non-conference game; ^{†}Homecoming; Rankings from AP Poll (and CFP Rankings, after November 3) – Released prior to game; All times are in Eastern time; Source:

== Game summaries ==
=== vs Toledo ===
Toledo Rockets (0–0) at Michigan State Spartans (0–0) – Game summary

Quarter	1	2	3	4	Total
Rockets	0	7	7	6	20
Spartans	10	9	0	11	30

at Spartan Stadium • East Lansing, Michigan

- Date: September 4
- Game time: 8:00 p.m. EST
- Game weather: Sunny • Temperature: 80 °F (27 °C) • Wind: NW at 6 miles per hour (9.7 km/h)
- Game attendance: 72,083
- Referee: Matthew Richards
- TV announcers (FS1): Noah Reed (play-by-play) and Petros Papadakis (analyst)

Game information

First quarter

- MSU – Cam Edwards 2-yard run (Liam Boyd kick), 6:59. Spartans 7–0. Drive: 13 plays, 63 yards, 7:14.
- MSU – Liam Boyd 32-yard field goal, 0:06. Spartans 10–0. Drive: 11 plays, 56 yards, 5:34.

Second quarter

- MSU – Liam Boyd 42-yard field goal, 11:37. Spartans 13–0. Drive: 5 plays, 16 yards, 2:45.
- TOL – Adjatay Dabbs 60-yard pass from John Alan Richter (Reice Griffith kick), 7:50. Spartans 13–7. Drive: 7 plays, 75 yards, 3:47.
- MSU – Liam Boyd 48-yard field goal, 4:10. Spartans 16–7. Drive: 7 plays, 15 yards, 3:32.
- MSU – Liam Boyd 35-yard field goal, 0:00. Spartans 19–7. Drive: 10 plays, 46 yards, 2:33.

Third quarter

- TOL – Adjatay Dabbs 6-yard pass from John Alan Richter (Reice Griffith kick), 6:49. Spartans 19–14. Drive: 6 plays, 60 yards, 2:08.

Fourth quarter

- TOL – Connor Walendzak 71-yard run (pass failed), 13:47. Rockets 20–19. Drive: 2 plays, 71 yards, 0:49.
- MSU – Rodney Bullard Jr. 5-yard pass from Alessio Milivojevic (Alessio Milivojevic–Rodney Bullard Jr. pass), 10:37. Spartans 27–20. Drive: 7 plays, 70 yards, 3:10.
- MSU – Liam Boyd 51-yard field goal, 1:55. Spartans 30–20. Drive: 11 plays, 43 yards, 5:55.

Statistics	TOL	MSU
First downs	10	26
Plays–yards	41–273	83–397
Rushes–yards	20–77	89–150
Passing yards	196	247
Passing: comp–att–int	12–21–1	26–34–0
Turnovers	1	0
Time of possession	16:44	43:16

Team	Category	Player	Statistics
Toledo	Passing	John Alan Richter	12/21, 196 yards, 2 TD, INT
Toledo	Rushing	Connor Walendzak	7 carries, 76 yards, TD
Toledo	Receiving	Adjatay Dabbs	4 receptions, 101 yards, 2 TD
Michigan State	Passing	Alessio Milivojevic	26/34, 247 yards, TD
Michigan State	Rushing	Cam Edwards	27 carries, 98 yards, TD
Michigan State	Receiving	Rodney Bullard Jr.	7 receptions, 90 yards, TD

=== vs Eastern Michigan ===
Eastern Michigan Eagles (1–1) at Michigan State Spartans (1–0) – Game summary

Quarter	1	2	3	4	Total
Eagles	0	7	0	0	7
Spartans	7	7	14	7	35

at Spartan Stadium • East Lansing, Michigan

- Date: September 12
- Game time: 3:30 p.m. EST
- Game weather: Sunny • Temperature: 82 °F (28 °C) • Wind: N at 8 miles per hour (13 km/h)
- Game attendance: 70,712
- Referee: Tim Day
- TV announcers (BTN): Chris Vosters (play-by-play), Matt Millen (analyst), and Dannie Rogers (sideline)

Game information

First quarter

- MSU – Fredrick Moore 18-yard pass from Alessio Milivojevic (Liam Boyd kick), 6:32. Spartans 7–0. Drive: 3 plays, 24 yards, 0:27.

Second quarter

- MSU – Cam Edwards 1-yard run (Liam Boyd kick), 8:45. Spartans 14–0. Drive: 16 plays, 80 yards, 7:19.
- EMU – Noah Kim 4-yard run (Rudy Kessinger kick), 1:50. Spartans 14–7. Drive: 13 plays, 78 yards, 6:50.

Third quarter

- MSU – Cam Edwards 2-yard run (Liam Boyd kick), 8:50. Spartans 21–7. Drive: 13 plays, 75 yards, 6:10.
- MSU – Charles Taplin 38-yard pass from Alessio Milivojevic (Liam Boyd kick), 5:46. Spartans 28–7. Drive: 3 plays, 60 yards, 1:22.

Fourth quarter

- MSU – Jaziun Patterson 7-yard run (Liam Boyd kick), 7:48. Spartans 35–7. Drive: 3 plays, 53 yards, 1:12.

Statistics	EMU	MSU
First downs	13	26
Plays–yards	52–219	71–472
Rushes–yards	26–101	45–258
Passing yards	118	214
Passing: comp–att–int	16–26–0	18–26–0
Turnovers	1	1
Time of possession	28:39	31:21

Team	Category	Player	Statistics
Eastern Michigan	Passing	Noah Kim	16/26, 118 yards
Eastern Michigan	Rushing	Braydon Bennett	9 carries, 56 yards
Eastern Michigan	Receiving	Harold Mack	5 receptions, 49 yards
Michigan State	Passing	Alessio Milivojevic	12/20, 170 yards, 2 TD
Michigan State	Rushing	Cam Edwards	21 carries, 152 yards, 2 TD
Michigan State	Receiving	Charles Taplin	3 receptions, 65 yards, TD

=== at No. 3 Notre Dame (rivalry) ===
Michigan State Spartans (2–0) at No. 3 Notre Dame Fighting Irish (2–0) – Game summary

Quarter	1	2	3	4	Total
Spartans	0	10	0	0	10
No. 3 Fighting Irish	10	7	3	7	27

at Notre Dame Stadium • Notre Dame, Indiana

- Date: September 19
- Game time: 7:30 p.m. EST
- Game weather: Cloudy • Temperature: 71 °F (22 °C) • Wind: E at 4 miles per hour (6.4 km/h)
- Game attendance: 77,622
- Referee: Gregory Blum
- TV announcers (NBC): Noah Eagle (play-by-play), Todd Blackledge (analyst), and Kathryn Tappen (sideline)

Game information

First quarter

- ND – Spencer Porath 25-yard field goal, 12:06. Fighting Irish 3–0. Drive: 5 plays, 68 yards, 2:54.
- ND – Nolan James JR. 2-yard run (Spencer Porath kick), 4:31. Fighting Irish 10–0. Drive: 11 plays, 41 yards, 6:06.

Second quarter

- MSU – Liam Boyd 32-yard field goal, 10:05. Fighting Irish 10–3. Drive: 12 plays, 36 yards, 5:29.
- ND – Aneyas Williams 1-yard run (Spencer Porath kick), 4:46. Fighting Irish 17–3. Drive: 10 plays, 75 yards, 5:19.
- MSU – Cam Fancher 15-yard run (Liam Boyd kick), 3:31. Fighting Irish 17–10. Drive: 3 plays, 68 yards, 1:17.

Third quarter

- ND – Spencer Porath 35-yard field goal, 1:00. Fighting Irish 20–10. Drive: 17 plays, 77 yards, 9:42.

Fourth quarter

- ND – CJ Carr 3-yard run (Spencer Porath kick), 10:55. Fighting Irish 27–10. Drive: 4 plays, 68 yards, 2:13.

Statistics	MSU	ND
First downs	11	20
Plays–yards	45–167	67–395
Rushes–yards	27–44	43–161
Passing yards	123	234
Passing: comp–att–int	9–18–2	18–24–0
Turnovers	2	0
Time of possession	22:58	37:02

Team	Category	Player	Statistics
Michigan State	Passing	Alessio Milivojevic	9/17, 123 yards, 2 INT
Michigan State	Rushing	Cam Edwards	12 carries, 38 yards
Michigan State	Receiving	Rodney Bullard Jr.	2 receptions, 66 yards
Notre Dame	Passing	CJ Carr	18/24, 234 yards
Notre Dame	Rushing	Nolan James Jr.	26 carries, 121 yards, 1 TD
Notre Dame	Receiving	Micah Gilbert	8 receptions, 170 yards

=== vs Nebraska ===
Nebraska Cornhuskers (3–0) at Michigan State Spartans (2–1) – Game summary

Quarter	1	2	3	4	Total
Cornhuskers	7	17	0	7	31
Spartans	3	7	3	0	13

at Spartan Stadium • East Lansing, Michigan

- Date: September 26
- Game time: 5:00 p.m. EST
- Game weather: Sunny • Temperature: 72 °F (22 °C) • Wind: SW at 8 miles per hour (13 km/h)
- Game attendance: 68,161
- Referee: Jeff Servinski
- TV announcers (BTN): Jeff Levering (play-by-play), Jake Butt (analyst), and Brooke Fletcher (sideline)

Game information

First quarter

- MSU – Liam Boyd 48-yard field goal, 5:10. Spartans 3–0. Drive: 11 plays, 51 yards, 6:04.
- NEB – Kwazi Gilmer 44-yard pass from Anthony Colandrea (Kyle Cunanan kick), 1:45. Cornhuskers 7–3. Drive: 6 plays, 75 yards, 3:25.

Second quarter

- NEB – Mekhi Nelson 4-yard run (Kyle Cunanan kick), 11:54. Cornhuskers 14–3. Drive: 8 plays, 79 yards, 3:11.
- NEB – Kyle Cunanan 32-yard field goal, 10:00. Cornhuskers 17–3. Drive: 5 plays, 15 yards, 1:11.
- MSU – Jaziun Patterson 2-yard run (Liam Boyd kick), 6:07. Cornhuskers 17–10. Drive: 10 plays, 79 yards, 3:49.
- NEB – Vincent Genatone 13-yard pass from Anthony Colandrea (Kyle Cunanan kick), 0:02. Cornhuskers 24–10. Drive: 14 plays, 74 yards, 5:58.

Third quarter

- MSU – Liam Boyd 46-yard field goal, 10:02. Cornhuskers 24–13. Drive: 14 plays, 34 yards, 4:12.

Fourth quarter

- NEB – Vincent Genatone 1-yard run (Kyle Cunanan kick), 10:05. Cornhuskers 31–13. Drive: 12 plays, 66 yards, 6:22.

Statistics	NEB	MSU
First downs	22	22
Plays–yards	68–369	60–257
Rushes–yards	41–157	32–39
Passing yards	212	218
Passing: comp–att–int	15–17–0	19–28–1
Turnovers	0	3
Time of possession	30:19	29:41

Team	Category	Player	Statistics
Nebraska	Passing	Anthony Colandrea	15/27, 212 yards, 2 TD
Nebraska	Rushing	Anthony Colandrea	10 carries, 66 yards
Nebraska	Receiving	Kwazi Gilmer	4 receptions, 101 yards, TD
Michigan State	Passing	Alessio Milivojevic	18/26, 208 yards, INT
Michigan State	Rushing	Jaziun Patterson	16 carries, 54 yards, TD
Michigan State	Receiving	Chrishon McCray	4 receptions, 47 yards

=== at Wisconsin ===
Michigan State Spartans (2–2) at Wisconsin Badgers (3–1) – Game summary

Quarter	1	2	3	4	Total
Spartans	0	3	0	0	3
Badgers	14	3	7	7	31

at Camp Randall Stadium • Madison, Wisconsin

- Date: October 3
- Game time: 12:30 p.m. EST
- Game weather: Sunny • Temperature: 59 °F (15 °C) • Wind: S at 10 miles per hour (16 km/h)
- Game attendance: 67,001
- Referee: Kole Knueppel
- TV announcers (BTN): Jason Horowitz (play-by-play), Jake Butt (analyst), and Brooke Fletcher (sideline)

Game information

First quarter

- WIS – Jacob Harris 20-yard pass from Colton Joseph (Gavin Lahm kick), 8:16. Badgers 7–0. Drive: 13 plays, 75 yards, 6:44.
- WIS – Jacob Harris 15-yard pass from Colton Joseph (Gavin Lahm kick), 1:01. Badgers 14–0. Drive: 5 plays, 59 yards, 2:16.

Second quarter

- WIS – Gavin Lahm 30-yard field goal, 3:56. Badgers 17–0. Drive: 16 plays, 64 yards, 7:08.
- MSU – Liam Boyd 31-yard field goal, 0:09. Badgers 17–3. Drive: 8 plays, 51 yards, 0:51.

Third quarter

- WIS – Colton Jeseph 47-yard run (Gavin Lahm kick), 10:35. Badgers 24–3. Drive: 3 plays, 54 yards, 1:28.

Fourth quarter

- WIS – Malachi Coleman 46-yard pass from Colton Joseph (Gavin Lahm kick), 7:56. Badgers 31–3. Drive: 5 plays, 57 yards, 2:42.

Statistics	MSU	WIS
First downs	19	17
Plays–yards	79–235	62–373
Rushes–yards	45–127	42–228
Passing yards	108	145
Passing: comp–att–int	16–34–0	9–20–0
Turnovers	0	0
Time of possession	31:10	28:50

Team	Category	Player	Statistics
Michigan State	Passing	Alessio Milivojevic	15/32, 103 yards
Michigan State	Rushing	Jaziun Patterson	18 carries, 62 yards
Michigan State	Receiving	Jayden Savoury	4 receptions, 26 yards
Wisconsin	Passing	Colton Joseph	9/20, 145 yards, 3 TD
Wisconsin	Rushing	Colton Joseph	13 carries, 141 yards, TD
Wisconsin	Receiving	Malachi Coleman	1 receptions, 46 yards, TD

=== vs Illinois ===
Illinois Fighting Illini (2–3) at Michigan State Spartans (2–3) – Game summary

Quarter	1	2	3	4	OT	Total
Fighting Illini	10	10	3	8	7	38
Spartans	0	7	10	14	6	37

at Spartan Stadium • East Lansing, Michigan

- Date: October 10
- Game time: 3:30 p.m. EST
- Game weather: Sunny • Temperature: 77 °F (25 °C) • Wind: SE at 14 miles per hour (23 km/h)
- Game attendance: 65,837
- Referee: Mark Kluczynski
- TV announcers (FS1): Jack Kizer (play-by-play) and Mark Helfrich (analyst)

Game information

First quarter

- ILL – Ethan Moczulski 40-yard field goal, 11:46. Fighting Illini 3–0. Drive: 7 plays, 54 yards, 3:14.
- ILL – Aidan Laughery 5-yard pass from Katin Houser (Ethan Moczulski kick), 3:21. Fighting Illini 10–0. Drive: 11 plays, 80 yards, 6:51.

Second quarter

- ILL – Katin Houser 2-yard run (Ethan Moczulski kick), 8:57. Fighting Illini 17–0. Drive: 14 plays, 82 yards, 7:18.
- MSU – Jaziun Patterson 6-yard pass from Alessio Milivojevic (Liam Boyd kick), 3:29. Fighting Illini 17–7. Drive: 11 plays, 75 yards, 5:28.
- ILL – Ethan Moczulski 35-yard field goal, 0:00. Fighting Illini 20–7. Drive: 12 plays, 58 yards, 3:29.

Third quarter

- ILL – Ethan Moczulski 38-yard field goal, 8:48. Fighting Illini 23–7. Drive: 8 plays, 30 yards, 3:16.
- MSU – Liam Boyd 42-yard field goal, 2:52. Fighting Illini 23–10. Drive: 10 plays, 64 yards, 5:52.
- MSU – Jaziun Patterson 11-yard run (Liam Boyd kick), 1:30. Fighting Illini 23–17. Drive: 1 plays, 11 yards, 0:11.

Fourth quarter

- ILL – Collin Dixon 14-yard pass from Michael Clayton II (Aidan Laughery rush), 13:14. Fighting Illini 31–17. Drive: 7 plays, 75 yards, 3:16.
- MSU – Fredrick Moore 24-yard pass from Alessio Milivojevic (Liam Boyd kick), 7:47. Fighting Illini 31–24. Drive: 10 plays, 75 yards, 3:16.
- MSU – Jaziun Patterson 2-yard run (Liam Boyd kick), 1:17. Tied 31–31. Drive: 6 plays, 33 yards, 2:10.

Overtime

- ILL – Hudson Clement 25-yard pass from Michael Clayton II (Ethan Moczulski kick), 0:00. Fighting Illini 38–31. Drive: 1 plays, 25 yards, 0:00.
- MSU – Jaziun Patterson 1-yard run (pass failed), 0:00. Fighting Illini 38–37. Drive: 5 plays, 25 yards, 0:00.

Statistics	ILL	MSU
First downs	25	19
Plays–yards	70–409	54–342
Rushes–yards	33–127	27–127
Passing yards	282	215
Passing: comp–att–int	26–37–1	23–27–0
Turnovers	1	1
Time of possession	33:52	26:08

Team	Category	Player	Statistics
Illinois	Passing	Katin Houser	20/29 194 yards, TD, INT
Illinois	Rushing	Aidan Laughery	17 carries, 70 yards
Illinois	Receiving	Hudson Clement	6 receptions, 105 yards, TD
Michigan State	Passing	Alessio Milivojevic	22/26, 196 yards, 2 TD
Michigan State	Rushing	Jaziun Patterson	17 carries, 93 yards, 3 TD
Michigan State	Receiving	Jayden Savoury	6 receptions, 49 yards

=== vs No. 25 Northwestern ===
No. 25 Northwestern Wildcats (4–1) at Michigan State Spartans (2–4) – Game summary

Quarter	1	2	3	4	Total
No. 25 Wildcats	3	7	3	11	24
Spartans	7	7	0	7	21

at Spartan Stadium • East Lansing, Michigan

- Date: October 17
- Game time: 12:00 p.m. EST
- Game weather: Sunny • Temperature: 46 °F (8 °C) • Wind: NW at 6 miles per hour (9.7 km/h)
- Game attendance: 67,423
- Referee: Jim Wharrie
- TV announcers (Peacock/NBCSN): Paul Burmeister (play-by-play), Yogi Roth (analyst), and Caroline Pineda (sideline)

Game information

First quarter

- NU – Jackson Kleather 39-yard field goal, 8:23. Wildcats 3–0. Drive: 4 plays, -10 yards, 2:12.
- MSU – Alessio Milivojevic 3-yard run (Liam Boyd kick), 2:02. Spartans 7–3. Drive: 12 plays, 49 yards, 6:10.

Second quarter

- NU – Caleb Komolafe 10-yard run (Jackson Kleather kick), 11:04. Wildcats 10–7. Drive: 12 plays, 75 yards, 5:58.
- MSU – Bryson Williams 32-yard pass from Alessio Milivojevic (Liam Boyd kick), 0:47. Spartans 14–10. Drive: 9 plays, 77 yards, 2:01.

Third quarter

- NU – Jackson Kleather 37-yard field goal, 4:24. Spartans 14–13. Drive: 14 plays, 61 yards, 7:32.

Fourth quarter

- MSU – Chrishon McCray 53-yard pass from Alessio Milivojevic (Liam Boyd kick), 11:48. Spartans 21–13. Drive: 2 plays, 57 yards, 1:00.
- NU – Aidan Chiles 1-yard run (Aidan Chiles–Alex Honig pass), 7:24. Tied 21–21. Drive: 9 plays, 77 yards, 4:18.
- NU – Jackson Kleather 34-yard field goal, 0:02. Wildcats 24–21. Drive: 8 plays, 64 yards, 0:58.

Statistics	NU	MSU
First downs	23	15
Plays–yards	71–360	57–305
Rushes–yards	42–134	27–89
Passing yards	226	216
Passing: comp–att–int	18–28–0	19–30–0
Turnovers	0	1
Time of possession	34:55	25:05

Team	Category	Player	Statistics
Northwestern	Passing	Aidan Chiles	18/27, 226 yards
Northwestern	Rushing	Caleb Komolafe	15 carries, 67 yards, TD
Northwestern	Receiving	Griffin Wilde	6 receptions, 57 yards
Michigan State	Passing	Alessio Milivojevic	19/30, 216 yards, 2 TD
Michigan State	Rushing	Jaziun Patterson	15 carries, 72 yards
Michigan State	Receiving	Chrishon McCray	3 receptions, 64 yards, TD

=== at No. 9 UCLA ===
Michigan State Spartans (2–5) at No. 9 UCLA Bruins (6–0) – Game summary

Quarter	1	2	3	4	Total
Spartans	7	0	0	3	10
No. 9 Bruins	0	14	14	0	28

at Rose Bowl • Pasadena, California

- Date: October 24
- Game time: 3:30 p.m. EST
- Game weather: Sunny • Temperature: 74 °F (23 °C) • Wind: SE at 4 miles per hour (6.4 km/h)
- Game attendance: 33,757
- Referee: Bryan Banks
- TV announcers (CBS): Brad Nessler (play-by-play), Charles Davis (analyst), and Jenny Dell (sideline)

Game information

First quarter

- MSU – Kenneth Williams 14-yard pass from Kayd Coffman (Liam Boyd kick), 5:26. Spartans 7–0. Drive: 2 plays, 15 yards, 0:43.

Second quarter

- UCL – Jaivian Thomas 7-yard run (Mateen Bhaghani kick), 11:00. Tied 7–7. Drive: 5 plays, 19 yards, 2:01.
- UCL – Wayne Knight 1-yard run (Mateen Bhaghani kick), 3:04. Bruins 14–7. Drive: 5 plays, 21 yards, 2:32.

Third quarter

- UCL – Brian Rowe Jr. 63-yard pass from Ty Dieffenbach (Mateen Bhaghani kick), 13:00. Bruins 21–7. Drive: 4 plays, 75 yards, 1:56.
- UCL – Anthony Woods 4-yard run (Mateen Bhaghani kick), 5:27. Bruins 28–7. Drive: 10 plays, 70 yards, 5:27.

Fourth quarter

- MSU – Liam Boyd 46-yard field goal, 6:18. Bruins 28–10. Drive: 15 plays, 69 yards, 5:29.

Statistics	MSU	UCLA
First downs	11	25
Plays–yards	54–156	79–443
Rushes–yards	29–47	48–245
Passing yards	109	198
Passing: comp–att–int	13–25–2	18–31–0
Turnovers	3	2
Time of possession	24:02	35:58

Team	Category	Player	Statistics
Michigan State	Passing	Leo Hannan	9/15, 67 yards, INT
Michigan State	Rushing	Kenneth Williams	17 carries, 54 yards
Michigan State	Receiving	Chrishon McCray	3 receptions, 42 yards
UCLA	Passing	Ty Dieffenbach	18/31, 198 yards, TD
UCLA	Rushing	Anthony Woods	14 carries, 112 yards, TD
UCLA	Receiving	Brian Rowe Jr.	3 receptions, 74 yards, TD

=== at Michigan (rivalry) ===
Michigan State Spartans (2–6) at Michigan Wolverines (5–3) – Game summary

Quarter	1	2	3	4	Total
Spartans	0	6	3	6	15
Wolverines	0	0	0	6	6

at Michigan Stadium • Ann Arbor, Michigan

- Date: November 7
- Game time: 7:30 p.m. EST
- Game weather: Cloudy • Temperature: 40 °F (4 °C) • Wind: W at 5 miles per hour (8.0 km/h)
- Game attendance: 111,172
- Referee: Jeff Winters
- TV announcers (NBCSN/Peacock): Paul Burmeister (play-by-play), Yogi Roth (analyst) and Lewis Johnson (sideline)

Game information

First quarter

- No Scoring plays

Second quarter

- MSU – Liam Boyd 21-yard field goal, 1:33. Spartans 3–0. Drive: 10 plays, 47 yards, 3:24.
- MSU – Liam Boyd 37-yard field goal, 0:05. Spartans 6–0. Drive: 9 plays, 41 yards, 0:58.

Third quarter

- MSU – Liam Boyd 38-yard field goal, 2:12. Spartans 9–0. Drive: 17 plays, 79 yards, 10:41.

Fourth quarter

- MSU – Liam Boyd 24-yard field goal, 5:04. Spartans 12–0. Drive: 10 plays, 56 yards, 5:19.
- MSU – Liam Boyd 49-yard field goal, 4:09. Spartans 15–0. Drive: 4 plays, 6 yards, 0:21.
- MICH – Savion Hiter 1-yard run (pass failed), 1:35. Spartans 15–6. Drive: 13 plays, 75 yards, 2:34.

Statistics	MSU	MICH
First downs	17	13
Plays–yards	75–298	52–192
Rushes–yards	43–110	26–54
Passing yards	188	138
Passing: comp–att–int	21–32–0	14–26–2
Turnovers	0	4
Time of possession	36:31	23:29

Team	Category	Player	Statistics
Michigan State	Passing	Alessio Milivojevic	21/32, 188 yards
Michigan State	Rushing	Brandon Tullis	25 carries, 86 yards
Michigan State	Receiving	Chrishon McCray	6 receptions, 92 yards
Michigan	Passing	Tommy Carr	14/26, 138 yards, 2 INT
Michigan	Rushing	Bryson Kuzdzal	9 carries, 49 yards
Michigan	Receiving	Andrew Marsh	4 receptions, 38 yards

=== vs Washington ===
Washington Huskies (5–4) at Michigan State Spartans (3–6) – Game summary

Quarter	1	2	3	4	Total
Huskies	7	7	0	7	21
Spartans	7	7	0	0	14

at Spartan Stadium • East Lansing, Michigan

- Date: November 14
- Game time: 5:30 p.m. EST
- Game weather: Cloudy • Temperature: 41 °F (5 °C) • Wind: SE at 6 miles per hour (9.7 km/h)
- Game attendance: 60,275
- Referee: Jason Nickleby
- TV announcers (BTN): Chris Vosters (play-by-play) and Rhett Lewis (analyst)

Game information

First quarter

- MSU – Carson Gulker 1-yard run (Liam Boyd kick), 11:38. Spartans 7–0. Drive: 7 plays, 75 yards, 3:22.
- UW – Chris Lawson 58-yard pass from Demond Williams Jr. (Tyler Robles kick), 0:28. Tied 7–7. Drive: 7 plays, 86 yards, 2:12.

Second quarter

- UW – Chris Lawson 17-yard pass from Demond Williams Jr. (Tyler Robles kick), 7:52. Huskies 14–7. Drive: 7 plays, 87 yards, 3:39.
- MSU – Bryson Williams 2-yard pass from Cam Fancher (Liam Boyd kick), 1:55. Tied 14–14. Drive: 13 plays, 69 yards, 5:51.

Third quarter

- No Scoring plays

Fourth quarter

- UW – Jayden Limar 1-yard run (Tyler Robles kick), 2:24. Huskies 21–14. Drive: 8 plays, 78 yards, 4:48.

Statistics	WASH	MSU
First downs	17	20
Plays–yards	55–332	71–342
Rushes–yards	22–44	36–100
Passing yards	288	242
Passing: comp–att–int	22–33–0	21–34–1
Turnovers	1	2
Time of possession	27:19	32:41

Team	Category	Player	Statistics
Washington	Passing	Demond Williams Jr.	22/33, 288 yards, 2 TD
Washington	Rushing	Jayden Limar	10 carries, 29 yards, TD
Washington	Receiving	Chris Lawson	5 receptions, 124 yards, 2 TD
Michigan State	Passing	Cam Fancher	14/22, 134 yards, TD, INT
Michigan State	Rushing	Brandon Tullis	21 carries, 82 yards
Michigan State	Receiving	Fredrick Moore	4 receptions, 66 yards

=== vs No. 13 Oregon ===
No. 13 Oregon Ducks (7–3) at Michigan State Spartans (3–7) – Game summary

Quarter	1	2	3	4	Total
No. 13 Ducks	7	10	14	14	45
Spartans	0	0	7	0	7

at Spartan Stadium • East Lansing, Michigan

- Date: November 20
- Game time: 8:00 p.m. EST
- Game weather: Cloudy • Temperature: 48 °F (9 °C) • Wind: S at 12 miles per hour (19 km/h)
- Game attendance: 61,331
- Referee: Francisco Villar
- TV announcers (FOX): Tim Brando (play-by-play), Devin Gardner (analyst), and Josh Sims (sideline)

Game information

First quarter

- ORE – Brandon Smith 5-yard run (Gage Hurych kick), 5:14. Ducks 7–0. Drive: 9 plays, 51 yards, 4:07.

Second quarter

- ORE – Gage Hurych 40-yard field goal, 2:53. Ducks 10–0. Drive: 4 plays, -6 yards, 1:02.
- ORE – Gage Hurych fake field goal 15-yard touchdown run, 0:02. Ducks 17–0. Drive: 13 plays, 85 yards, 1:39.

Third quarter

- ORE – Simeon Price 1-yard run (Gage Hurych kick), 9:58. Ducks 24–0. Drive: 10 plays, 65 yards, 4:57.
- MSU – Jaziun Patterson 1-yard run (Liam Boyd kick), 2:50. Ducks 24–7. Drive: 13 plays, 67 yards, 7:00.
- ORE – Brandon Smith 1-yard run (Gage Hurych kick), 0:01. Ducks 31–7. Drive: 6 plays, 75 yards, 2:49.

Fourth quarter

- ORE – Dakorien Moore 31-yard pass from Dylan Raiola (Gage Hurych kick), 13:41. Ducks 38–7. Drive: 3 plays, 33 yards, 3:50.
- ORE – Simeon Price 1-yard run (Gage Hurych kick), 3:56. Ducks 45–7. Drive: 10 plays, 82 yards, 3:50.

Statistics	ORE	MSU
First downs	24	13
Plays–yards	72–422	60–200
Rushes–yards	38–188	37–80
Passing yards	234	120
Passing: comp–att–int	21–34–0	12–23–1
Turnovers	0	1
Time of possession	28:09	31:51

Team	Category	Player	Statistics
Oregon	Passing	Dylan Raiola	21/34, 234 yards, TD
Oregon	Rushing	Brandon Smith	14 carries, 121 yards, 2 TD
Oregon	Receiving	Dakorien Moore	5 receptions, 55 yards, TD
Michigan State	Passing	Kayd Coffman	10/19, 106 yards, INT
Michigan State	Rushing	Jaziun Patterson	16 carries, 26 yards, TD
Michigan State	Receiving	Fredrick Moore	2 receptions, 31 yards

=== at Rutgers ===
Michigan State Spartans (0–0) at Rutgers Scarlet Knights (0–0) – Game summary

Quarter	1	2	Total
Spartans			0
Scarlet Knight			0

at SHI Stadium • Piscataway, New Jersey

- Date: November 28
- Game time: 4:15 p.m. EST
- TV: BTN

Statistics	MSU	RUTG
First downs		
Plays–yards		
Rushes–yards		
Passing yards		
Passing: comp–att–int		
Time of possession		

Team	Category	Player	Statistics
Michigan State	Passing		
Michigan State	Rushing		
Michigan State	Receiving		
Rutgers	Passing		
Rutgers	Rushing		
Rutgers	Receiving		

== Personnel ==
=== Roster ===
2026 Michigan State Spartans football team roster
Players
Coaches
Offense

Pos.	#	Name	Class
RB	0	Cam Edwards	Sr
QB	2	Cam Fancher
WR	3	Rodney Bullard Jr.	Sr
RB	4	Jaziun Patterson	Sr
WR	5	Samson Gash	Fr
WR	6	Fredrick Moore	Jr
RB	7	Brandon Tullis	Jr
WR	8	KK Smith	Jr
QB	10	Kayd Coffman	Fr
QB	11	Alessio Milivojevic	So
TE	12	Carson Gulker
WR	13	Chrishon McCray	Sr
WR	14	Bryson Williams	Fr
QB	15	Leo Hannan	Fr
WR	16	Zach Washington	Fr
WR	17	Braylon Collier	Fr
WR	19	Charles Taplin	Fr
RB	20	Zion Gist	Fr
RB	21	Marvis Parrish	So
WR	22	Jack Yanachik	Jr
QB	23	Peyton Babbitt	Fr
RB	25	Jace Clarizio	Fr
RB	26	Cedric Williams Jr.	Fr
RB	27	Darrin Jones Jr.	Fr
TE	31	Jayden Savoury	Fr
RB	32	Kenneth Williams	Jr
RB	33	Jaxon McCaig	So
WR	37	Darelle Cochran	Fr
FB	44	Jay Coyne	Sr
TE	48	Charlie Baker	So
OL	52	Nick Sharpe
OL	54	Antonio Johnson	Fr
OL	55	Rakeem Johnson	So
OL	56	Jack Ziarko	Fr
OL	58	Conner Moore	Sr
OL	61	Collin Campbell	Fr
OL	63	Trent Fraley	Sr
OL	65	Cole Bertke	Fr
OL	68	Eli Bickel	Fr
OL	70	Luka Vincic	Sr
OL	71	Robert Wright Jr.	Jr
OL	73	Rustin Young	So
OL	75	Ben Murawski	Sr
OL	76	Drew Nichols	Fr
OL	77	Andrew Dennis	So
OL	79	Tristan Comer	Fr
WR	81	Colin Charles	Fr
TE	82	Brennan Paracheck	Jr
TE	84	Eddie Whiting	Fr
TE	86	Ethan Melville	Fr
TE	87	Joe Caudill	Fr
TE	88	Kai Rios	Sr
WR	89	Nick Hardy	Fr

Defense

Pos.	#	Name	Class
CB	0	NiJhay Burt	Sr
EDGE	1	Kenny Soares Jr.	Sr
S	2	Devin Vaught	Jr
CB	3	Tre Bell	Sr
CB	4	Charles Brantley
LB	5	Jordan Hall	Sr
EDGE	6	Leonard Ah You	Fr
S	7	Michael Richard	Sr
EDGE	8	Trey Lisle	So
EDGE	9	Keahnist Thompson	Sr
LB	10	DiMari Malone	Fr
DE	11	Anelu Lafaele	So
LB	12	Cam Stodghill	Sr
EDGE	13	Isaac Smith
DB	14	Andrew Brinson IV	So
S	15	Caleb Gash	Jr
LB	16	Adam Shaw	Fr
S	17	Jonathan Granby	Fr
LB	18	Dion Crawford	Sr
CB	20	Keshawn Williams	So
DB	21	Nikai Martinez	Sr
CB	22	Tyran Chappell	So
LB	23	DeJae White	Fr
CB	24	Jeremiah Favorite	Fr
DL	25	Carlos Hazelwood	So
S	26	Trevaughn Martinez	Jr
CB	27	Truth Umenyiora	Fr
S	28	Brayden Thomas	Fr
CB	29	KJ Deriso	Fr
S	30	Aveon Grose	Sr
S	31	Deuce Edwards	Fr
S	32	Evan Young	So
EDGE	33	Cory House Jr.	Fr
S	34	Khalil Majeed
S	35	Eliyjah Caldwell	Fr
LB	39	Jack Lansing III	Fr
CB	42	Luca Genrich	Fr
LB	44	Caleb Wheatland	Sr
LB	45	Brady Pretzlaff	So
EDGE	47	Jaxson Wilson	Jr
EDGE	51	Kekai Burnett	So
DL	52	Mikeshun Beeler	So
DL	55	Ben Roberts	Sr
EDGE	56	Chris Piwowarczyk	So
DL	57	Hudson Aultman	Fr
DL	91	Jackson Pahl	Fr
EDGE	94	Aidan Boehle	Jr
DL	96	Eli Coenen	Jr
DL	97	Cal Thrush	Fr
DL	98	Derrick Simmons	Fr

Special teams

Pos.	#	Name	Class
P	9	Rhys Dakin	Jr
K	37	Liam Boyd	5th
P	49	Alex Weeks	Fr
LS	50	Nick Duzansky	Jr
LS	53	Trey Serauskis	Fr
K	85	Stephen Gonzales	Fr

Head coach

- Pat Fitzgerald

Coordinators/assistant coaches

- LeVar Woods – Assistant head coach/special teams coordinator
- Joe Rossi – Defensive coordinator
- Nick Sheridan – Offensive coordinator
- Max Bullough – Co-defensive coordinator/linebackers
- James Adams – Safeties
- Andrew Bindelglass – Rush ends
- Winston DeLattiboudere III – Defensive linemen
- Courtney Hawkins – Wide receivers
- John McNulty – Quarterbacks
- Hank Poteat – Cornerbacks
- Devon Spalding – Running backs
- Nick Tabacca – Offensive linemen
- Brian Wozniak – Tight ends
- Morgan Bequeaith – Assistant quarterbacks
- Grover Bortolotti – Assistant running backs
- Jake Chaney – Assistant defensive linemen
- Elijah Douglass – Assistant cornerbacks
- Ted Flaherty – Assistant secondary
- Zac Garvin – Assistant special teams
- Chris Gordon – Assistant linebackers
- Colin Johnson – Assistant offensive linemen
- Jacob Lail – Assistant tight ends
- Josh Robinson – Assistant special teams coordinator
- Dominic Spalding – Assistant wide receivers

Legend

- (C) Team captain
- (S) Suspended
- (I) Ineligible
- Injured
- Redshirt

Roster
Last update: September 29, 2026

=== Coaching staff ===
Name	Position	Season
Pat Fitzgerald	Head Coach	1st
LeVar Woods	Assistant Head Coach/Special Teams Coordinator	1st
Joe Rossi	Defensive Coordinator	3rd
Nick Sheridan	Offensive Coordinator	1st
Max Bullough	Co-Defensive Coordintator/Linebackers Coach	1st
James Adams	Safeties Coach	2nd
Andrew Bindelglass	Rush Ends Coach	1st
Winston DeLattiboudere III	Defensive Line Coach	1st
Courtney Hawkins	Wide Receivers Coach	7th
John McNulty	Quarterbacks Coach	1st
Hank Poteat	Cornerbacks Coach	1st
Devon Spalding	Running Backs Coach	1st
Nick Tabacca	Offensive Line Coach	1st
Brian Wozniak	Tight Ends Coach	3rd
