= Matt Simon (disambiguation) =

Matt Simon (born 1986) is an Australian former soccer player

Matt Simon may also refer to:

- Matt Simon (American football, born 1953), American football coach and former player
- Matt Simon (American football, born 1985), American football coach and former player
- Matthew Simon (politician), American politician in New Hampshire
- Matilda Simon, 3rd Baroness Simon of Wythenshawe (born Matthew Simon), transgender British peeress

== See also ==
- Matt Simons (born 1987), American singer-songwriter
