= Isaac Fruechte =

American football player and coach (born 1991)

Minnesota Golden Gophers
- Title: Wide receivers coach

Personal information
- Born: March 7, 1991 (age 35); Caledonia, Minnesota, U.S.
- Listed height: 6 ft 3 in (1.91 m)
- Listed weight: 210 lb (95 kg)

Career information
- High school: Caledonia (MN)
- College: Rochester C&T (2010); Minnesota (2011–2014)
- NFL draft: 2015: undrafted

Career history

Playing
- Minnesota Vikings (2015–2016)*; Detroit Lions (2016)*; Minnesota Vikings (2016)
- * Offseason or practice squad member only

Coaching
- Wisconsin–La Crosse (2018) Co-offensive coordinator & wide receivers coach; Northern Iowa (2019) Wide receivers coach; Northern State (2020–2021) Offensive coordinator, quarterbacks coach, & wide receivers coach; Winona State (2022–2023) Associate head coach, offensive coordinator, quarterbacks coach, & wide receivers coach; North Dakota (2024–2025) Offensive coordinator & quarterbacks coach; Minnesota (2026–present) Wide receivers coach

Awards and highlights
- Second-team All-MCAC (2010)
- Stats at Pro Football Reference

Isaac Fruechte (born March 7, 1991) is an American college football coach and former wide receiver. He is the wide receivers coach for the University of Minnesota, a position he has held since 2026. Fruechte played college football at Rochester Community and Technical College and Minnesota as well as in high school in-state at Caledonia.

== Early life ==
Fruechte is a graduate of Caledonia High School in Caledonia, Minnesota. Under the guidance of his father Carl, who is a legendary football and basketball coach at Caledonia, Isaac played as a wide receiver and safety and helped lead the Warriors to two consecutive state championships (2007, 2008), three section championships, and two 3 Rivers Conference titles. He was a two-time Associated Press Honorable Mention All-State selection and a three-time All-3 Rivers conference selection. Following his senior season, he was named to the St. Paul Pioneer Press All-State team. In addition to football, Fruechte was also a standout track and field athlete at Caledonia, earning four straight berths at the state championships. He had a personal-best time of 10.82 seconds in the 100-meter dash and was timed under 4.4 seconds in the 40-yard dash.

== College career ==
=== Rochester C&T ===
Fruechte had been asked to walk on at the University of Minnesota out of high school, but due to Minnesota's strict admission standards, Isaac's math score in high school was not good enough; therefore, he opted to enroll at Rochester Community and Technical College in the fall of 2010 instead. Listed at 6-foot-3, 200-pound, Fruechte played his freshman season in 2010 with the Yellowjackets, catching 30 passes for 805 yards and nine touchdowns, helping the team finish with a 10–2 record, beating Central Lakes 34–31 in the Minnesota College Athletic Conference (MCAC) championship game before falling to Iowa Central 32–7 in the North Star Bowl. For his efforts, he was named to the second-team All-MCAC. After graduating from Rochester in December, Fruechte enrolled at Minnesota for the spring semester.

=== Minnesota ===
In his first season with the Gophers, Isaac started nine out of 12 games. He recorded 19 receptions for 256 yards and two touchdowns for the run-heavy Minnesota offense. The Gophers improved their record to 6–7 and went to the Texas Bowl, their first bowl game in years. Fruechte was named Minnesota's Wide Receiver of the Year at the Gophers' annual football banquet.

As a sophomore in 2013, Fruechte started six out of 13 games. He recorded 13 receptions for 154 yards in a year where the passing game struggled and the running game flourished. The Gophers improved their record to 8–5 and went back to the Texas Bowl for the second year in a row.

During his senior year, Fruechte played in all 13 games and set career-highs in receptions with 18 and receiving yards with 292. As the year went on, his role on the team expanded. He had three receptions for 46 yards against Northwestern in Week 6, and a 45-yard catch against Purdue the following week. On October 25 against Illinois, he had a career game with three receptions for 105 yards, including his lone touchdown of the season on a 52-yard pass from quarterback Mitch Leidner. The Gophers went 8–5 again, beating Michigan, Iowa, and Nebraska, to earn a New Years Day bowl game in the Citrus Bowl.

==== Statistics ====
Season	Team	Games		Receiving				Rushing			
Season	Team	GP	GS	Rec	Yds	Avg	TD	Att	Yds	Avg	TD
2012	Minnesota	12	9	19	256	13.5	2	0	0	0.0	0
2013	Minnesota	13	6	13	154	11.8	0	3	5	1.7	0
2014	Minnesota	13	3	18	292	16.2	1	2	-10	-5.0	0
Total		38	18	50	702	14.0	3	5	-5	-1.0	0

== Professional career ==
Pre-draft measurables
Height	Weight	Arm length	Hand span	40-yard dash	10-yard split	20-yard split	20-yard shuttle	Three-cone drill	Vertical jump	Broad jump	Bench press
6 ft 2 5/8 in (1.90 m)	209 lb (95 kg)	30 1/2 in (0.77 m)	9 3/8 in (0.24 m)	4.50 s	1.54 s	2.57 s	4.22 s	6.89 s	36 in (0.91 m)	10 ft 7 in (3.23 m)	11 reps
All values from Minnesota's Pro Day

=== Minnesota Vikings (first stint) ===
Fruechte was signed by the Minnesota Vikings after going undrafted in the 2015 NFL draft. On September 3, 2016, he was released by the Vikings as part of final roster cuts.

=== Detroit Lions ===
On September 5, 2016, Fruechte was signed to the Detroit Lions practice squad. He was released by the team on September 21, 2016.

=== Minnesota Vikings (second stint) ===
On September 27, 2016, Fruechte was signed to the Vikings' practice squad. With the Vikings set to take on the Chicago Bears for their last game of the regular season, the Vikings promoted Fruechte to the active roster on December 31 due to injury issues at the wide receiver position.

On September 2, 2017, Fruechte was waived by the Vikings.

== Coaching career ==
In spring 2018, Fruechte was hired as the wide receivers coach for Wisconsin–La Crosse. Prior to the season starting he was promoted to co-offensive coordinator and quarterbacks coach.

In 2019, Fruechte was hired as the wide receivers coach for Northern Iowa.

In 2020, Fruechte was hired as the offensive coordinator, quarterbacks coach, and wide receivers coach for Northern State.

In 2022, Fruechte was hired as the associate head coach, offensive coordinator, quarterbacks coach, and wide receivers coach for Winona State.

In 2024, Fruechte was hired as the offensive coordinator and quarterbacks coach for North Dakota.

On December 1, 2024, Fruechte was named the interim head coach for the University of North Dakota after previous head coach Bubba Schweigert stepped down.

Fruechte was hired as the Wide Receivers coach for Minnesota in January 2026.
