= Luke Drzewiecki =

American football player (born 2003)

No. 12 – Minnesota Golden Gophers
- Position: Placekicker
- Class: Senior

Personal information
- Born: October 6, 2003 (age 23)
- Listed height: 6 ft 0 in (1.83 m)
- Listed weight: 186 lb (84 kg)

Career information
- High school: Eisenhower (Shelby Township, Michigan)
- College: New Mexico (2022–2025); Minnesota (2026–present)
- Stats at ESPN

Luke Drzewiecki (born October 6, 2003) is an American football kicker for the Minnesota Golden Gophers. He previously played for the New Mexico Lobos.

== Early life ==
Drzewiecki committed to play college football for the New Mexico Lobos as a preferred walk-on.

== College career ==
In four seasons at New Mexico from 2022 to 2025, Drzewiecki converted 51 of 65 field goals and 120 of 122 extra points. After the 2025 season, he entered the NCAA transfer portal.

Drzewiecki transferred to play for the Minnesota Golden Gophers. In week 8 of the 2026 season, he hit a game-winning 46-yard field goal against Iowa.
