= Brian Wozniak =

American football player and coach

Current position
- Title: Tight ends coach
- Team: Michigan State
- Conference: Big Ten

Biographical details
- Born: Loveland, Ohio, U.S.

Playing career
- 2009–2013: Wisconsin
- Position(s): Tight end

Coaching career (HC unless noted)
- 2015–2017: Oregon State (GA)
- 2018: Oregon State (Analyst)
- 2019–2023: Oregon State (TE)
- 2024–present: Michigan State (TE)

Brian Wozniak is an American former football tight end who played at Wisconsin. Wozniak is currently the tight ends coach at Michigan State. age 32

== Playing career ==
Wozniak graduated from Loveland High School in Loveland, Ohio where he played at tight end and linebacker. As a senior, Wozniak was named second-team All-Ohio and first-team all-conference. After high school, Wozniak joined the Wisconsin program where he played tight end from 2009-2014 winning three Big Ten Championships. Wozniak was named a team captain as a senior. Following graduation, Wozniak signed with the Atlanta Falcons as an undrafted free agent.

== Coaching career ==
After a brief stint with the Atlanta Falcons, Wozniak joined the Oregon State coaching staff as a graduate assistant. Wozniak was promoted to offensive analyst in December 2017. Wozniak was elevated to tight ends coach and recruiting coordinator in July 2018. In November 2023, Wozniak joined the Michigan State staff as tight ends coach.
