= Greg Harbaugh Jr. =

American football player and coach (born 1986)

Greg Harbaugh
Biographical details
- Born: September 21, 1986 (age 40); Raleigh, North Carolina, U.S.
- Education: Averett University (2009); Western Michigan University (2016)

Playing career
- 2005–2008: Averett
- Positions: Quarterback, wide receiver

Coaching career (HC unless noted)
- 2009–2010: North Carolina Wesleyan (WR/RB)
- 2011–2012: Methodist (CB)
- 2013–2014: Marietta (PGC/RC)
- 2015–2016: Western Michigan (GA)
- 2017: Minnesota (QC)
- 2018: Chattanooga (WR)
- 2019: Minnesota (QC)
- 2020–2021: Western Michigan (WR)
- 2022: Minnesota (TE)
- 2023–2024: Minnesota (co-OC/QB)
- 2025–2026: Minnesota (OC/QB)

Administrative career (AD unless noted)
- 2013–2014: Marietta (AC)

Greg Harbaugh Jr. (HAR-bo; born September 21, 1986) is an American college football coach. He was most recently the offensive coordinator and quarterbacks coach for the University of Minnesota. Harbaugh played college football for Averett as a quarterback and wide receiver. He also coached for North Carolina Wesleyan, Methodist, Marietta, Western Michigan, and Chattanooga.

== Early life and education ==
Harbaugh was born on September 21, 1986, in Raleigh, North Carolina. He attended and played high school football for Sanderson High School in Raleigh before playing college football for Averett as a quarterback and wide receiver.

Harbaugh graduated from Averett University in 2009 with a bachelor's degree in sport management and earned his master's degree in sport management from Western Michigan University in 2016.

Harbaugh is not related to the Harbaugh family.

== Coaching career ==
Harbaugh began coaching upon graduating from Averett with a position with North Carolina Wesleyan as the school's wide receiver and running backs coach. In two seasons with the team he helped lead them to two conference championships and one NCAA Division III playoff appearance in 2009.

In 2011, Harbaugh moved onto Methodist where he worked as the cornerbacks coach for two seasons before moving on to Marietta. With Marietta he served as the passing game coordinator, recruiting coordinator, video coordinator, and academic coordinator. In 2015, he joined Western Michigan as a graduate assistant as he earned his master's degree.

In 2017, Harbaugh began his first stint with Minnesota as a quality control coach. In 2018, with Chattanooga he coached wide receivers before being fired and returning for a second time to Minnesota as a quality control coach. He returned to coaching wide receivers as he returned for a second stint with Western Michigan in 2020 through 2021.

In 2022, Harbaugh began his third stint with Minnesota—this time as the tight ends coach. After Kirk Ciarrocca left to become the offensive coordinator for Rutgers, Harbaugh joined Matt Simon as co-offensive coordinators for the 2023 season. He also took on the role of quarterbacks coach, alongside his co-offensive duties, for the 2023 season. Prior to the 2025 season, he was named offensive coordinator, with Simon being named co-offensive coordinator. On November 15, 2026, with two games left in the season, and not scoring more than 20 points in six consecutive games, Minnesota fired Harbaugh.

== See also ==
- List of current NCAA Division I FBS football coaches
