= Brandon Smith (running back) =

American football player

No. 26 – Oregon Ducks
- Position: Running back
- Class: Freshman

Personal information
- Listed height: 6 ft 0 in (1.83 m)
- Listed weight: 203 lb (92 kg)

Career information
- High school: Central (Fresno, California)
- College: Oregon (2026–present)
- Stats at ESPN

Brandon Smith is an American college football running back for the Oregon Ducks.

== Early life ==
Smith attended Central High School in Fresno, California, where he played running back and linebacker. As a junior, he rushed for 1,871 yards with 25 touchdowns and had 71 tackles with two interceptions on defense. As a senior, he was The Fresno Bee Player of the Year after rushing for 2,189 yards with 32 touchdowns on offense and 88 tackles with four interceptions on defense. Smith originally committed to play college football at the University of Arizona before flipping his commitment to the University of Oregon.

== College career ==
Smith earned playing time his freshman year at Oregon in 2026.
