= Mariano Sori-Marin =

American football player and coach (born 1999)

Current position
- Title: Nickelbacks coach Assistant linebackers coach
- Team: Minnesota Golden Gophers
- Conference: Big Ten

Biographical details
- Born: December 15, 1999 (age 26); Mokena, Illinois, U.S.
- Education: University of Minnesota

Playing career
- 2018–2022: Minnesota
- Position: Linebacker

Coaching career (HC unless noted)
- 2023: Minnesota (defensive analyst)
- 2024–present: Minnesota (Linebackers Coach)

Mariano Sori-Marin (born December 15, 1999) is an American football coach who currently serves as the nickelbacks and assistant linebackers coach for the University of Minnesota. He played college football for the Minnesota Golden Gophers as a linebacker from 2018 to 2022.

== Early years ==
Sori-Marin was born on December 15, 1999, in Mokena, Illinois.

== High school career ==
Sori-Marin attended Providence Catholic High School in New Lenox, Illinois, and played high school football for the Celtics. He played as a linebacker and wide receiver, and also ran track.

Finishing his high school career, he was ranked as a three-star prospect, and received nine offers to played college football. All of them but one were to play in the NCAA FCS level. The only offer from a FBS level team were the Minnesota Golden Gophers, and he finally committed to play with them.

The other teams that offered him were the Brown Bears, Colgate Raiders, Cornell Big Red, Harvard Crimson, Lehigh Mountain Hawks, Penn Quakers, Western Illinois Leathernecks and Yale Bulldogs.

== College career ==
Sori-Marin attended University of Minnesota and played college football for the Minnesota Golden Gophers from 2018 to 2022.

In 2018, his freshman year, he only appeared on the special teams.

In 2019 he played 13 games, starting seven times, and finished the season with 42 tackles and 18 solo tackles.

In 2020 he started all 7 games, and finished the year with 54 tackles, leading his team. On week 8 against the Nebraska Cornhuskers, he recorded his career-high 18 tackles and forced one fumble, and he was named the Big Ten Defensive Player of the Week.

In 2021, Sori-Marin registered 85 total tackles, which was the second-best mark of the Gophers, starting the 13 games.

In his final season, he again started all 13 games, recording 88 total tackles (45 solo), six tackles for loss, 1.5 quarterback sacks and three pass deflections.

=== Highlights ===
- Third-team All-Big Ten (2022)
- All-Big Ten Honorable Mention (2021)
- 4× Academic All-Big Ten (2019–2022)

=== College statistics ===
Year	Team	Games		Tackles					Interceptions			Fumbles
Year	Team	GP	GS	Cmb	Solo	Ast	Sck	TFL	Int	Yds	PD	FF
2018	Minnesota	12	0	5	1	4	0	0	0	0	0	0
2019	Minnesota	13	7	42	18	24	0	2	0	0	0	0
2020	Minnesota	7	7	54	28	26	0	1.5	0	0	3	1
2021	Minnesota	13	13	85	45	40	0	4.5	1	10	3	2
2022	Minnesota	13	13	88	45	43	1.5	6	0	0	3	0
Career		58	40	274	137	137	1.5	14.5	1	10	9	3

== Professional career ==
Pre-draft measurables
Height	Weight	Arm length	Hand span	40-yard dash	10-yard split	20-yard split	20-yard shuttle	Three-cone drill	Vertical jump	Broad jump	Bench press
6 ft 2 in (1.88 m)	236 lb (107 kg)	31 1/8 in (0.79 m)	9 1/2 in (0.24 m)	4.64 s	1.69 s	2.64 s	4.27 s	7.17 s	35 in (0.89 m)	9 ft 9 in (2.97 m)	16 reps
All values from Pro Day.

Sori-Marin was signed as an undrafted free agent by the San Francisco 49ers after the 2023 NFL draft. He was waived with an injury designation on June 22, 2023.

== Coaching career ==
On September 6, 2023, Sori-Marin returned to Minnesota Golden Gophers as an intern. On September 18, 2023, he was named a volunteer defensive analyst.

For the 2024 season, Sori-Marin was promoted to the nickelbacks and assistant linebackers coach.
