= Nick Monroe (American football) =

American football coach (born 1979)

Current position
- Title: Co-defensive coordinator, cornerbacks coach
- Team: Minnesota
- Conference: Big Ten

Biographical details
- Born: May 25, 1979 (age 47); Mahtomedi, Minnesota, U.S.
- Education: St. Cloud State University (2001)

Playing career
- 1997–2001: St. Cloud State
- Position: Defensive back

Coaching career (HC unless noted)
- 2002–2003: Allegheny College (DB)
- 2004: Colgate (OLB)
- 2005: Colgate (OLB/Recruiting Coordinator)
- 2006–2008: Colgate (DB/Recruiting Coordinator)
- 2009: Colgate (co-DC/DB/Recruiting Coordinator)
- 2010–2015: Bowling Green (DB)
- 2016–2017: Syracuse (DB)
- 2018–2021: Syracuse (S)
- 2022: Syracuse (DPGC/S)
- 2023–present: Minnesota (co-DC/CB)

Nick Monroe (born May 25, 1979) is an American football coach who is currently the co-defensive coordinator and cornerbacks coach for the Minnesota Golden Gophers.

== Coaching career ==
Monroe got his first career coaching job in 2002 with Allegheny College as the team's secondary coach. In 2004, Monroe was hired by the Colgate Raiders where he coached for the next six years serving in various roles and finishing his tenure as the team's co-defensive coordinator. In 2010, Monroe was hired by the Bowling Green Falcons to coach the team's safeties. In 2016, Monroe was hired by the Syracuse Orange to be the team's secondary coach. In 2018, Monroe transitioned to primarily coach Syracuse's safeties. In 2022, Monroe become Syracuse's safeties coach and pass game coordinator. For the 2023 Pinstripe Bowl, Monroe was temperley promoted to serve as the Orange's defensive coordinator. In 2023, Monroe joined the Minnesota Golden Gophers, as the team's co-defensive coordinator and cornerbacks coach.
