= Joe Rossi (American football) =

American football player and coach (born 1979)

Current position
- Title: Defensive coordinator & linebackers coach
- Team: Michigan State
- Conference: Big Ten

Biographical details
- Born: April 5, 1979 (age 47); Pittsburgh, Pennsylvania, U.S.

Playing career
- 1997–2000: Allegheny
- Position: Defensive end

Coaching career (HC unless noted)
- 2001–2002: Thiel (DL)
- 2003–2006: Thiel (DC/LB)
- 2007–2008: Maine (ST/DB)
- 2009–2011: Maine (DC/LB)
- 2012–2013: Rutgers (ST)
- 2014–2015: Rutgers (DC/S)
- 2017: Minnesota (QC)
- 2018: Minnesota (DL)
- 2018: Minnesota (Interim DC/LB)
- 2019–2023: Minnesota (DC/LB)
- 2024–present: Michigan State (DC/LB)

Joseph Rossi (born 1979) is an American football coach who is the defensive coordinator and linebackers coach for Michigan State.

== Early life ==
Rossi grew up in Pittsburgh, Pennsylvania, where he attended Central Catholic High School. He competed on the football team as a defensive lineman. Rossi then accepted an academic scholarship to continue his playing career at Allegheny College. He was a three-time All-North Coast Athletic Conference (NCAC).

== Coaching career ==
On March 12, 2012, Rossi was named the special teams coordinator for the Rutgers Scarlet Knights football team. In 2013, Rossi was elevated to defensive coordinator for the Scarlet Knights.

Rossi was named Gophers defensive line coach in January 2018 after working as a quality control assistant for Minnesota in 2017. On November 24, 2018, Joe Rossi was promoted to defensive coordinator. In 2022, he coached the Gophers defense to a pair of shutouts for the first time since 2006.

On December 11, 2023, Rossi was named the defensive coordinator and linebackers coach for Michigan State
