= Deven Eastern =

American football player (born 2003)

No. 97 – Seattle Seahawks
- Position: Nose tackle
- Roster status: Practice squad

Personal information
- Born: April 5, 2003 (age 23); Shakopee, Minnesota, U.S.
- Listed height: 6 ft 5 in (1.96 m)
- Listed weight: 315 lb (143 kg)

Career information
- High school: Shakopee (Shakopee, Minnesota)
- College: Minnesota (2021–2025)
- NFL draft: 2026: 7th round, 242nd overall pick

Career history
- Seattle Seahawks (2026–present)
- Stats at Pro Football Reference

Deven Eastern (born April 5, 2003) is an American professional football nose tackle for the Seattle Seahawks of the National Football League (NFL). He played college football for the Minnesota Golden Gophers and was selected by the Seahawks in the seventh round of the 2026 NFL draft.

== Early life ==
Eastern attended Shakopee High School in Shakopee, Minnesota. Coming out of high school, he was rated as a four-star recruit and committed to play college football for the Minnesota Golden Gophers over multiple other power five offers.

== College career ==
As a freshman in 2021, Eastern took a redshirt. In 2022, he totaled four tackles with one going for a loss, and a pass deflection in six games. In 2023, Eastern tallied 27 tackles with one being for a loss. In 2024, he started in all 13 games, totaling 27 tackles with five being for a loss, two sacks, two pass deflections, a forced fumble. Eastern returned to the Golden Gophers for the 2025 season. In week 11, he notched two tackles and a sack versus Michigan State.

== Professional career ==
Pre-draft measurables
Height	Weight	Arm length	Hand span	Wingspan	Three-cone drill	Vertical jump	Broad jump
6 ft 5 1/4 in (1.96 m)	315 lb (143 kg)	34 in (0.86 m)	10 in (0.25 m)	6 ft 10 1/2 in (2.10 m)	8.07 s	27.5 in (0.70 m)	9 ft 4 in (2.84 m)
All values from NFL Combine

Eastern was selected by the Seattle Seahawks in the seventh round with the 242nd overall pick of the 2026 NFL draft. He was waived by Seattle on August 30, 2026, as a part of final roster cuts, and re-signed a day later to the practice squad. He was promoted to the active roster on November 7. He was waived on November 16, and re-signed to the practice squad a day later.
