= Eric Koehler =

American football coach (born c. 1974)

Current position
- Title: Tight ends coach
- Team: Minnesota
- Conference: Big Ten

Biographical details
- Born: c. 1974 (age 51–52); Fowler, Indiana, U.S.

Playing career
- 1993–1996: Hanover
- Position: Wide receiver

Coaching career (HC unless noted)
- 1997: Hanover (WR)
- 1998: WPI (WR)
- 1999–2000: Wisconsin–Platteville (OC/WR)
- 2001: Rose–Hulman (OC/QB)
- 2002–2005: Wartburg (AHC/OC)
- 2006–2007: Wartburg
- 2008: Grand Valley State (OC/RB)
- 2009–2012: Grand Valley State (OC/QB)
- 2013: Illinois State (QB)
- 2014–2020: Miami (OH) (co-OC/QB)
- 2021–2022: Miami (OH) (AHC/OC/QB)
- 2023: Minnesota (OA)
- 2024–present: Minnesota (TE)

Head coaching record
- Overall: 16–4

Eric Koehler (born c. 1974) is an American college football coach. He is the tight ends coach for the University of Minnesota, a position he has held since 2024. He was the head football coach for Wartburg College from 2006 to 2007. He also coached for Hanover, WPI, Wisconsin–Platteville, Rose–Hulman, Grand Valley State, Illinois State, and Miami of Ohio. He played college football for Hanover as a wide receiver.

== Head coaching record ==
Year	Team	Overall	Conference	Standing	Bowl/playoffs	D3^{#}
Wartburg Knights (Iowa Conference) (2006–2007)
2006	Wartburg	8–2	6–2	2nd		
2007	Wartburg	8–2	7–1	2nd		20
Wartburg:		16–4	13–3			
Total:		16–4				
