= Matt Simon (American football, born 1985) =

American football player and coach (born 1985)

Biographical details
- Born: December 4, 1985 (age 40); Farmington, Minnesota, U.S.
- Education: Northern Illinois University

Playing career
- 2004–2008: Northern Illinois
- Position: Wide receiver

Coaching career (HC unless noted)
- 2010: Northern Illinois (Offensive quality control)
- 2011: St. Thomas (MN) (TE)
- 2012: Rutgers (Player development)
- 2013: Rutgers (WR)
- 2014–2016: Western Michigan (WR)
- 2017–2018: Minnesota (WR)
- 2018: Minnesota (Interim OC/WR)
- 2019: Minnesota (Passing game coordinator/WR)
- 2020–2025: Minnesota (co-OC/WR)

Matt Simon (born December 4, 1985) is an American football coach and former player who was most recently the co-offensive coordinator and wide receivers coach for the Minnesota Golden Gophers. He played college football for the Northern Illinois Huskies.

== Playing career ==
Despite being offered a preferred walk-on spot at Minnesota, Simon chose play wide receiver at Northern Illinois.

He signed with the New Orleans Saints after his career at Northern Illinois as an undrafted free agent, spending time on their practice squad for the 2009 and taking a year off, before rejoining them for the 2010 season.

== Coaching career ==
=== Early coaching career ===
After failing to make the Saints active roster in 2010, he joined the coaching staff at his alma mater Northern Illinois as an offensive quality control coach. He spent one season at the University of St. Thomas as a tight ends coach before joining the coaching staff at Rutgers.

=== Rutgers ===
Simon joined the staff at Rutgers in 2012 as a player development coach. During his stint as a player development coach, Simon worked with the Scarlet Knights special teams unit. He was promoted to wide receivers coach in 2013,

=== Western Michigan ===
Simon was named the wide receivers coach at Western Michigan in 2014, joining the coaching staff of P. J. Fleck, who was Simon's position coach for the last two seasons of Simon's playing career. During his time at Western Michigan, Simon was pivotal in the development of receiver Corey Davis, who set the NCAA Division I FBS record for most career receiving yards during his time at Western Michigan and was the highest NFL draft pick from Western Michigan.

=== Minnesota ===
After Fleck was named the head coach at Minnesota, Simon joined Fleck's staff as the wide receivers coach. He added passing game coordinator to his duties for the 2019 season.

After offensive coordinator Kirk Ciarrocca left to be the offensive coordinator at rival Penn State, Simon was named the interim offensive coordinator for the 2020 Outback Bowl against Auburn. Simon's performance as the offensive play-caller was praised by Fleck and others as the Gophers offense put up 494 total yards in the 31–24 victory.

After Mike Sanford Jr. was hired to be the Gophers offensive coordinator, Simon was promoted to co-offensive coordinator.

Simon was fired by the Gophers after the 2025 season.

== Personal life and education ==
A native of Farmington, Minnesota, Simon attended Farmington High School, graduating in 2004. He graduated from Northern Illinois in 2008 with a degree in organizational management. During his break off from the NFL, Simon worked at an oil equipment rental company in Louisiana.

Simon married his wife Charlotte in July 2016. They have a son, Dean.
