= 2026 UCLA Bruins football team =

American college football season

2026 UCLA Bruins football
- Conference: Big Ten Conference

Ranking
- Coaches: No. 4
- AP: No. 4
- CFP: No. 4
- Record: 10–1 (7–1 Big Ten)
- Head coach: Bob Chesney (1st season)
- Offensive coordinator: Dean Kennedy (1st season)
- Offensive scheme: Spread
- Defensive coordinator: Colin Hitschler (1st season)
- Base defense: 4–2–5
- Home stadium: Rose Bowl

Uniform

2026 Big Ten Conference football standings
	Conf.			Overall
Team	W		L	W		L
No. 4 UCLA	7	–	1	10	–	1
No. 8 Indiana	6	–	2	9	–	2
No. 15 Iowa	6	–	2	9	–	2
No. 13 Oregon	6	–	2	8	–	3
No. 18 USC	5	–	3	8	–	3
No. 14 Ohio State	5	–	3	7	–	4
Wisconsin	5	–	3	7	–	4
Nebraska	4	–	4	7	–	4
Washington	4	–	4	7	–	4
Illinois	4	–	4	6	–	5
Minnesota	4	–	4	6	–	5
Michigan	3	–	5	6	–	5
Northwestern	3	–	5	6	–	5
Penn State	3	–	5	6	–	5
Maryland	2	–	6	4	–	7
Purdue	2	–	6	3	–	8
Rutgers	2	–	6	3	–	8
Michigan State	1	–	7	3	–	8
Championship: December 5, 2026
^ – College Football Playoff participant; $ – Conference champion; y – Championship game participant; As of November 22, 2026; Rankings from CFP rankings

The 2026 UCLA Bruins football team represents the University of California, Los Angeles as a member of the Big Ten Conference during the 2026 NCAA Division I FBS football season. They are led by first-year head coach Bob Chesney, and play their home games at Rose Bowl located in Pasadena, California. It is the Bruins' 107th season overall and 3rd as a member of the Big Ten. Coming off a 3–9 record in 2025, they began the season 10–0 and ranked No. 4 in the Associated Press (AP) poll, their highest ranking since reaching No. 4 after a 6–0 start in 2001. UCLA opened the season with Nico Iamaleava as their starting quarterback, but he was lost for the season after a leg injury in week 5 against Oregon. He was replaced by Ty Dieffenbach.

== Offseason ==
=== Departures ===
==== NFL draft ====
Name	Pos.	Team	Round	Pick

==== Outgoing transfers ====
Name	No.	Pos.	Height	Weight	Year	Hometown	New school
Kanye Clark	1	DL	6'0"	190	FR	Sacramento, CA	Florida
Rico Flores Jr.	1	WR	6'2"	205	SO	North Highlands, CA	Virginia
Andre Jordan Jr.	2	DB	6'1"	175	JR	Federal Way, WA	Auburn
Kwazi Gilmer	3	WR	6'2"	190	SO	Los Angeles, CA	Nebraska
Ezavier Staples	4	WR	6'4"	205	SR	Long Beach, CA	
Ben Perry	10	LB	6'3"	210	Sr	Chicago, IL	Louisville
Jaedon Wilson	11	WR	6'3"	185	SR	DeSoto, TX	
Jamir Benjamin	12	DB	5'10"	185	FR	Lansing, MI	Rice
Luke Duncan	12	QB	6'6"	210	SO	Orinda, CA	Nevada
Carter Shaw	14	WR	6'3"	195	SO	Atherton, CA	Stanford
Anthony Jones	15	DL	6'5"	265	JR	Las Vegas, NV	Nebraska
Henry Hasselbeck	18	QB	6'3"	180	FR	Weston, MA	Appalachian State
Jadyn Marshall	18	DB	6'1"	200	JR	Stockton, CA	Cal Poly
Jamier Johnson	19	DB	6'0"	190	SR	Pasadena, CA	
Croix Stewart	22	DB	6'2"	205	JR	Vallejo, CA	Fresno State
Bryon Threats	23	DB	5'10"	185	SR	Byron, GA	
Jadyn Hudson	27	DB	6'2"	195	FR	Pittsburg, CA	College of San Mateo
Scooter Jackson	28	DB	6'1"	185	JR	Compton, CA	Withdrew/returning to UCLA
Jack Pedersen	28	TE	6'5"	240	JR	Murrieta, CA	Washington State
Marquise Villahermosa	29	DB	5'10"	175	RS-SO	Los Angeles, CA	Colorado Mesa
Isaiah Chisom	32	LB	6'1"	235	SO	Santa Clarita, CA	Oklahoma State
Morrow Evans	41	LS	6'1"	220	FR	Houston, TX	Rice
Will Karol	49	P	6'4"	210	JR	Mosman, NSW	Texas Tech
Garrison Blank	54	OL	6'7"	330	FR	Rocklin, CA	Sacramento State
A.J. Fuimaono	55	DL	6'4"	311	SO	Las Vegas, NV	Withdrew/returning to UCLA
Oluwafunto Akinshilo	69	OL	6'5"	325	SR	Lagos, Nigeria	Syracuse
Siale Taupaki	92	DL	6'4"	335	JR	Oakland, CA	Penn State
Mateen Bhaghani	94	PK	6'1"	175	JR	San Diego, CA	Withdrew/returning to UCLA
Jalen Hargrove	95	DL	6'3"	310	RS-SR	Paterson, NJ	
Keanu Williams	99	DL	6'5"	320	SR	Clovis, CA	Penn State

==== Coaching departures ====
Name	Previous Position	New Position
DeShaun Foster	UCLA - Head coach	None
Jethro Franklin	UCLA - Defensive line coach	None
Ramsen Golpashin	UCLA - Senior defensive analyst	San Jose State - Offensive line coach
Andy Kwon	UCLA - Offensive line coach	Memphis - Offensive line coach
Ikaika Malloe	UCLA - Defensive coordinator and interior linebackers coach	Penn State - Run game coordinator and defensive line coach
Demetrice Martin	UCLA - Passing game coordinator and secondary	Arizona State - Senior defensive analyst
Corey Miller	UCLA - Head football performance coach	Liberty - Assistant football performance coach
Jerry Neuheisel	UCLA - Interim offensive coordinator, assistant head coach and tight ends coach	Northwestern - Quarterbacks coach
Tim Skipper	UCLA - Interim head coach	Cal Poly - Head coach
Tino Sunseri	UCLA - Offensive coordinator and quarterbacks coach	Indiana - Co-offensive coordinator and quarterbacks coach
Burl Toler III	UCLA - Pass game coordinator and wide receivers coach	None
Scott White	UCLA - Associate head coach and linebackers coach	San Diego State - Run game coordinator and linebackers coach

=== Acquisitions ===
==== Incoming transfers ====
Name	No.	Pos.	Height	Weight	Year	Hometown	Prev. school
Leland Smith	0	WR	6'2"	200	Sr	Houston, TX	San Jose State
Aidan Mizell	1	WR	6'2"	170	R-Jr	Orlando, FL	Florida
Brian Rowe Jr.	2	WR	5'11"	155	So	Concord, NC	South Carolina
Wayne Knight	3	RB	5'7"	189	R-Sr	Smyrna, DE	James Madison
Semaj Morgan	4	WR	5'9.5"	185	Sr	Detroit, MI	Michigan
Tao Johnson	6	S	6'2"	180	R-Sr	Idaho Falls, ID	Utah
Sammy Omosigho	10	LB	6'1"	215	R-Sr	Heartland, TX	Oklahoma
Landon Ellis	11	WR	6'3"	185	Sr	Orange, VA	James Madison
Malik Hartford	12	S	6'2.5"	175	R-Jr	West Chester, OH	Ohio State
Ty Dieffenbach	14	QB	6'5"	185	R-Jr	Agoura Hills, CA	Cal Poly
Marcus Harris	15	WR	5'11"	185	R-Fr	Eastvale, CA	Washington
Sahir West	15	DL	6'3"	220	R-So	Baltimore, MD	James Madison
Osiris Gilbert	18	CB	5'9"	160	So	Duluth, GA	UConn
Ryan McCulloch	19	DL	6'3"	235	R-Jr	Arcadia, CA	California
Dante Lovett Jr.	21	CB	6'0"	195	R-Jr	Crofton, MD	Virginia Tech
Dylan Lee	22	RB	6'0"	185	R-So	Gilbert, AZ	Iowa State
Jhase McMillan	23	CB	5'9"	170	So	Fulshear, TX	Montana State
Trent Hendrick	25	LB	6'0"	234	R-Sr	Richmond, VA	James Madison
Ta'Shawn James	27	S	6'1"	185	R-Jr	Oklahoma City, OK	Iowa State
Derrick Barksdale	32	CB	5'9"	160	Sr	Rock Hill, SC	James Madison
Curtis Gerrand	35	P	6'1"	190	So	Melbourne, AUS	Sam Houston
Dallin Havea	35	DL	6'3"	250	R-So	Orem, UT	Utah Tech
Anthony Sacca	39	LB	6'2.5"	225	R-Fr	Delran, NJ	Notre Dame
Chase Barry	45	P/K	6'4"	208	R-Sr	San Juan Capistrano, CA	Oklahoma State
Riley Robell	51	IOL	6'2"	280	R-Jr	Harrisburg, PA	James Madison
Carter Sweazie	52	IOL	6'2"	300	R-Sr	Ashburn, VA	James Madison
Derek Osman	54	IOL	6'4"	290	R-Sr	Mercer Island, WA	Harvard
Drew Spinogatti	56	LB	6'0"	228	R-Sr	Winter Garden, FL	James Madison
Hall Schmidt	65	OT	6'7"	285	R-Sr	Gig Harbor, WA	Boise State
Jordan Davis	68	OT	6'5"	300	R-Sr	Fairburn, GA	South Alabama
Sean Na'a	71	IOL	6'2"	311	R-Jr	Inglewood, CA	Arizona State
Mack Indestad	76	OT	6'7"	265	R-Sr	Lemont, IL	Eastern Michigan
JD Rayner	77	IOL	6'5"	270	R-Fr	Canton, MA	James Madison
Brayden Loftin	85	TE	6'4"	225	R-Sr	Omaha, NE	Kansas State
Stevie Amar Jr.	88	TE	6'3.5"	225	R-Fr	Oxnard, CA	Boston College
Josh Phifer	89	TE	6'5"	225	R-Jr	Peachtree City, GA	James Madison
Amier Washington	90	DL	6'2.5"	245	R-Jr	Orange, TX	Texas Tech
Darold DeNgohe	92	DL	6'3"	260	R-Jr	Philadelphia, PA	Rutgers
Tyson Ford	95	DL	6'4.2"	265	R-Jr	St. Louis, MO	California
Aiden Gobaira	97	DL	6'5"	220	R-Sr	Fairfax, VA	James Madison
Maxwell Roy	99	DL	6'2.5"	290	R-Fr	Philadelphia, PA	Ohio State
Harry Lodge	--	TE	6'6"	240	R-Sr	Cambridge, MA	Wake Forest
Mason Rivera	--	S	6'0"	190	R-Sr	Tracy, CA	Cal Poly

==== Recruiting class ====
College recruiting (2026)
Name	Hometown	School	Height	Weight	Commit date
Overall recruit ranking:
Note: In many cases, Scout, Rivals, 247Sports, On3, and ESPN may conflict in their listings of height and weight.; In these cases, the average was taken. ESPN grades are on a 100-point scale.; Sources:

==== Coaches acquisitions ====
Name	Previous Position	New Position
Drew Canan	JMU - Special teams coordinator and tight ends coach	UCLA - Special teams coordinator and tight ends coach
Bob Chesney	JMU - Head coach	UCLA - Head coach
Sam Daniels	JMU - Defensive line coach	UCLA - Defensive ends coach
Anthony DiMichele	JMU - Safeties coach	UCLA - Safeties coach
Colin Hitschler	JMU - Defensive coordinator	UCLA - Defensive coordinator
Dean Kennedy	JMU - Offensive coordinator and quarterbacks coach	UCLA - Offensive coordinator
Colin Lockett	New Mexico - Wide receivers coach	UCLA - Wide receivers coach
Chris Smith	JMU - Offensive line coach and run game coordinator	UCLA - Offensive line coach and run game coordinator
Vic So'oto	Cal - Linebackers coach	UCLA - Linebackers coach
Legi Suiaunoa	Michigan State - Defensive line coach	UCLA - Defensive line coach
Eddie Whitley Jr.	JMU - Cornerbacks coach	UCLA - Defensive backs coach
Jon Boyer	Michigan State	assistant quarterbacks coach
Mike Cordova	James Madison	assistant tight ends coach
Chris Monfiletto	Buffalo	assistant special teams coordinator/specialist coach

== Preseason ==
=== Big Ten media days ===
- July 29, 2026 – UCLA Big Ten Conference media day

== Schedule ==
Date	Time	Opponent	Rank	Site	TV	Result	Attendance
September 5	7:30 p.m.	at California*		California Memorial Stadium; Berkeley, CA (rivalry)	ESPN	W 45–24	54,283
September 12	4:15 p.m.	San Diego State*		Rose Bowl; Pasadena, CA	BTN	W 28–10	31,973
September 19	8:00 p.m.	Purdue		Rose Bowl; Pasadena, CA	BTN	W 52–38	30,916
September 26	10:30 a.m.	at Maryland		SECU Stadium; College Park, MD	BTN	W 54–3	40,125
October 10	12:30 p.m.	at No. 13 Oregon	No. 21	Autzen Stadium; Eugene, OR	CBS	W 17–15	59,262
October 17	4:30 p.m.	Wisconsin	No. 12	Rose Bowl; Pasadena, CA	NBC	W 17–7	36,045
October 24	12:30 p.m.	Michigan State^{†}	No. 9	Rose Bowl; Pasadena, CA	CBS	W 28–10	33,757
October 31	1:15 p.m.	Nevada*	No. 7	Rose Bowl; Pasadena, CA	BTN	W 27–0	24,611
November 7	9:00 a.m.	at Minnesota	No. 8	Huntington Bank Stadium; Minneapolis, MN	FOX	W 34–20	43,841
November 13	6:00 p.m.	Illinois	No. 4	Rose Bowl; Pasadena, CA	FOX	W 22–14	45,800
November 21	12:30 p.m.	at Michigan	No. 4	Michigan Stadium; Ann Arbor, MI	CBS	L 16–18 ^{3OT}	109,618
November 28	12:30 p.m.	USC		Rose Bowl; Pasadena, CA (Victory Bell)	CBS		
*Non-conference game; ^{†}Homecoming; Rankings from AP Poll (and CFP Rankings, after November 3) – Released prior to game; All times are in Pacific time; Source:

== Rankings ==
UCLA began the season unranked before entering the AP poll at No. 23 following a 4–0 start. After improving to 8–0, the Bruins were No. 8 in the initial College Football Playoff (CFP) rankings. It tied the program's then-highest CFP ranking, set in 2014. Their road win over Minnesota the following week pushed UCLA to No. 4 in the CFP rankings.

Ranking movements Legend: ██ Increase in ranking ██ Decrease in ranking — = Not ranked RV = Received votes ( ) = First-place votes
	Week																
Poll	Pre	1	2	3	4	5	6	7	8	9	10	11	12	13	14	15	Final
AP	—	RV	RV	RV	23	21	12	9	7	5	4	4					
Coaches	—	RV	RV	RV	23	22	12	10	7 (1)	5	4 (1)	4					
CFP	Not released									8	4	4					Not released

== Game summaries ==
=== at California (rivalry) ===
UCLA Bruins (0–0) at California Golden Bears (0–0) – Game summary

Quarter	1	2	3	4	Total
Bruins	7	17	0	21	45
Golden Bears	7	10	7	0	24

at California Memorial Stadium • Berkeley, California

- Date: September 5
- Game time: 7:30 p.m. PST
- Game weather: Sunny • Temperature: 70 °F (21 °C)
- Game attendance: 54,283
- Referee: Francisco Villar
- TV announcers (ESPN): Tom Hart, Roddy Jones, and Quint Kessenich

Game information

First quarter

- CAL – Chase Hendricks 9-yard pass from Jaron-Keawe Sagapolutele (Towns McGough kick), 10:28. Golden Bears 7–0. Drive: 10 plays, 75 yards, 4:32.
- UCLA – Nico Iamaleava 9-yard run (Mateen Bhaghani kick), 7:00. Tied 7–7. Drive: 7 plays, 71 yards, 3:21.

Second quarter

- CAL – Towns McGough 28-yard field goal, 12:46. Golden Bears 10–7. Drive: 13 plays, 61 yards, 5:10.
- UCLA – Anthony Woods 31-yard run (Mateen Bhaghani kick), 10:19. Bruins 14–10. Drive: 5 plays, 75 yards, 2:27.
- UCLA – Wayne Knight 8-yard run (Mateen Bhaghani kick), 3:23. Bruins 21–10. Drive: 9 plays, 76 yards, 4:46.
- CAL – Mason Mini 8-yard pass from Jaron-Keawe Sagapolutele (Towns McGough kick), 0:13. Bruins 21–17. Drive: 5 plays, 87 yards, 0:38.
- UCLA – Mateen Bhaghani 38-yard field goal, 0:03. Bruins 24–17. Drive: 2 plays, 43 yards, 0:09.

Third quarter

- CAL – Adam Mohammed 1-yard run (Towns McGough kick), 3:50. Tied 24–24. Drive: 14 plays, 85 yards, 8:28.

Fourth quarter

- UCLA – Wayne Knight 31-yard run (Mateen Bhaghani kick), 8:46. Bruins 31–24. Drive: 1 play, 31 yards, 0:07.
- UCLA – Wayne Knight 4-yard run (Mateen Bhaghani kick), 2:58. Bruins 38–24. Drive: 8 plays, 46 yards, 4:03.
- UCLA – Anthony Woods 53-yard run (Mateen Bhaghani kick), 1:17. Bruins 45–24. Drive: 1 play, 53 yards, 0:09.

Statistics	UCLA	CAL
First downs	20	23
Plays–yards	54–461	87–410
Rushes–yards	277	119
Passing yards	184	291
Passing: comp–att–int	14–22–1	26–47–2
Turnovers	1	3
Time of possession	25:11	34:49

Team	Category	Player	Statistics
UCLA	Passing	Nico Iamaleava	14/22, 184 yards, INT
UCLA	Rushing	Anthony Woods	8 carries, 118 yards, 2 TD
UCLA	Receiving	Mikey Matthews	4 receptions, 88 yards
California	Passing	Jaron-Keawe Sagapolutele	24/41, 271 yards, 2 TD, 2 INT
California	Rushing	Adam Mohammed	28 carries, 120 yards, TD
California	Receiving	Ian Strong	5 receptions, 94 yards

Wayne Knight ran for three touchdowns to help UCLA win 45–24 over California in Bob Chesney's first game as the Bruins head coach. UCLA safety Ta'Shawn James recorded two interceptions off Jaron-Keawe Sagapolutele in the fourth quarter, when the Bruins outscored the Golden Bears 21–0. UCLA rushed for all six of its touchdowns, including two by Anthony Woods.

=== vs San Diego State ===
San Diego State Aztecs (1–0) at UCLA Bruins (1–0) – Game summary

Quarter	1	2	3	4	Total
Aztecs	0	0	0	10	10
Bruins	0	0	7	21	28

at Rose Bowl • Pasadena, California

- Date: September 12
- Game time: 4:15 p.m.
- Game weather: Sunny • Temperature: 87 °F (31 °C) • Wind: SW at 6 miles per hour (9.7 km/h)
- Game attendance: 31,973
- Referee: Gary Reed
- TV announcers (BTN): Wayne Randazzo, Brett Hundley, and Emma Carpenter

Game information

First quarter

- No scoring plays.

Second quarter

- No scoring plays.

Third quarter

- UCLA – Wayne Knight 8-yard run (Mateen Bhaghani kick), 11:17. Bruins 7–0. Drive: 4 plays, 43 yards, 2:05.

Fourth quarter

- SDSU – Cooper DiLeva 46-yard field goal, 13:11. Bruins 7–3. Drive: 9 plays, 48 yards, 2:28.
- UCLA – Wayne Knight 7-yard run (Mateen Bhaghani kick), 7:17. Bruins 14–3. Drive: 9 plays, 75 yards, 5:54.
- UCLA – Jaivian Thomas 1-yard run (Mateen Bhaghani kick), 4:31. Bruins 21–3. Drive: 4 plays, 19 yards, 1:59.
- SDSU – Jackson Ford 19-yard pass from Jayden Denegal (Cooper DiLeva kick), 2:28. Bruins 21–10. Drive: 5 plays, 65 yards, 2:03.
- UCLA – Wayne Knight 36-yard run (Mateen Bhaghani kick), 2:16. Bruins 28–10. Drive: 2 plays, 42 yards, 2:16.

Statistics	SDSU	UCLA
First downs	14	19
Plays–yards	56–189	66–365
Rushes–yards	38–144	43–214
Passing yards	45	151
Passing: comp–att–int	6–18–1	14–23–1
Turnovers	1	1
Time of possession	25:05	34:55

Team	Category	Player	Statistics
San Diego State	Passing	Jayden Denegal	6/17, 45 yards, TD, INT
San Diego State	Rushing	Lucky Sutton	19 carries, 81 yards
San Diego State	Receiving	Jackson Ford	1 reception, 19 yards, TD
UCLA	Passing	Nico Iamaleava	14/22, 151 yards, INT
UCLA	Rushing	Wayne Knight	13 carries, 97 yards, 3 TD
UCLA	Receiving	Semaj Morgan	6 receptions, 73 yards

Knight scored three touchdowns for the second consecutive week, and the Bruins won their home opener 28–10 over San Diego State. UCLA ran for 214 yards, their second straight game over 200 yards. They did not allow a touchdown until 2:28 remaining in the game.

=== vs Purdue ===
Purdue Boilermakers (1–1) at UCLA Bruins (2–0) – Game summary

Quarter	1	2	3	4	Total
Boilermakers	7	14	10	7	38
Bruins	21	3	14	14	52

at Rose Bowl • Pasadena, California

- Date: September 19
- Game time: 8:00 p.m. PST
- Game weather: Sunny • Temperature: 72 °F (22 °C) • Wind: SW at 3 miles per hour (4.8 km/h)
- Game attendance: 30,916
- Referee: Jason Nickleby
- TV announcers (BTN): Jason Horowitz, Brock Vereen, and Kelsie Kasper

Statistics	PUR	UCLA
First downs	23	35
Plays–yards	59–488	80–645
Rushes–yards	28–63	48–369
Passing yards	425	276
Passing: comp–att–int	20–31–1	19–32–0
Turnovers	3	0
Time of possession	23:50	36:10

Team	Category	Player	Statistics
Purdue	Passing	Ryan Browne	19/30, 378 yards, 3 TD, INT
Purdue	Rushing	Fame Ijeboi	17 carries, 47 yards, 2 TD
Purdue	Receiving	Xavier Townsend	6 receptions, 162 yards, 2 TD
UCLA	Passing	Nico Iamaleava	19/31, 276 yards, 3 TD
UCLA	Rushing	Wayne Knight	18 carries, 177 yards, 2 TD
UCLA	Receiving	Semaj Morgan	4 receptions, 72 yards, 2 TD

In UCLA's Big Ten opener, Knight ran for 177 yards and two touchdowns and Nico Iamaleava passed for 276 yards and three touchdowns in a 52–28 win over Purdue. Woods ran for a 16-yard touchdown on the Bruins first drive of the third quarter to help them regain the lead, and they pulled away in the second half. UCLA improved to 3–0, matching their win total from the previous season. Chesney became the third Bruins coach in the last 50 years to begin their tenure 3–0, joining Terry Donahue (1976) and Jim Mora (2012).

=== at Maryland ===
UCLA Bruins (3–0) at Maryland Terrapins (2–1) – Game summary

Quarter	1	2	3	4	Total
Bruins	0	20	14	20	54
Terrapins	0	3	0	0	3

at SECU Stadium • College Park, Maryland

- Date: September 26
- Game time: 10:30 a.m. PST
- Game weather: Cloudy • Temperature: 65 °F (18 °C) • Wind: N at 11 miles per hour (18 km/h)
- Game attendance: 40,125
- Referee: Gregory Blum
- TV announcers (BTN): Mark Followill (play-by-play), Rhett Lewis (analyst), and Caroline Hendershot (sideline)

Statistics	UCLA	MD
First downs	19	13
Plays–yards	63–475	69–181
Rushes–yards	39–266	30–39
Passing yards	209	142
Passing: comp–att–int	15–24–0	19–39–4
Time of possession	31:34	28:24

Team	Category	Player	Statistics
UCLA	Passing	Nico Iamaleava	15/24, 209 yards, TD
UCLA	Rushing	Wayne Knight	10 carries, 100 yards, TD
UCLA	Receiving	Aidan Mizell	1 reception, 83 yards, TD
Maryland	Passing	Malik Washington	18/38, 142 yards, 4 INT
Maryland	Rushing	Iverson Howard	12 carries, 34 yards
Maryland	Receiving	Chris Durr	7 receptions, 56 yards

The Bruins intercepted Maryland quarterback Malik Washington four times, returning two for touchdowns, in a 54–3 win over the Terrapins. Knight rushed for 100 yards and a touchdown, and UCLA gained 266 yards running, their fourth straight game with 200+ yards on the ground. Chesney became the second head coach to win their first four games with UCLA, joining Red Sanders in 1949.

=== at No. 13 Oregon ===
No. 21 UCLA Bruins (4–0) at No. 13 Oregon Ducks (3–1) – Game summary

Quarter	1	2	3	4	Total
No. 21 Bruins	3	7	0	7	17
No. 13 Ducks	6	0	0	9	15

at Autzen Stadium • Eugene, Oregon

- Date: October 10
- Game time: 12:30 p.m.
- Game weather: Sunny • Temperature: 56 °F (13 °C) • Wind: E at 2 miles per hour (3.2 km/h)
- Game attendance: 59,262
- Referee: Chris Coyte
- TV announcers (CBS): Brad Nessler (play-by-play), Charles Davis (analyst), and Jenny Dell (sideline reporter)

Game information

First quarter

- UCLA – Mateen Bhaghani 21-yard field goal, 10:47. Bruins 3–0. Drive: 8 plays, 73 yards, 4:13.
- ORE – Jordon Davison 1-yard run (run failed), 7:57. Ducks 6–3. Drive: 1 plays, 1 yards, 0:04.

Second quarter

- UCLA – Wayne Knight 35-yard run (Mateen Bhaghani kick), 8:08. Bruins 10–6. Drive: 4 plays, 51 yards, 2:17.

Third quarter

- No scoring plays.

Fourth quarter

- UCLA – Wayne Knight 9-yard pass from Ty Dieffenbach (Mateen Bhaghani kick), 13:31. Bruins 17–6. Drive: 6 plays, 33 yards, 2:55.
- ORE – Gage Hurych 26-yard field goal, 5:16. Bruins 17–9. Drive: 8 plays, 60 yards, 3:23.
- ORE – Evan Stewart 44-yard pass from Brock Thomas (run failed), 2:16. Bruins 17–15. Drive: 4 plays, 57 yards, 0:50.

Statistics	UCLA	ORE
First downs	17	12
Plays–yards	70–345	62–272
Rushes–yards	47–140	27–73
Passing yards	205	199
Passing: comp–att–int	13–23–2	17–35–2
Time of possession	39:15	20:45

Team	Category	Player	Statistics
UCLA	Passing	Nico Iamaleava	10/17, 162 yards, 2 INT
UCLA	Rushing	Wayne Knight	22 carries, 103 yards, TD
UCLA	Receiving	Aidan Mizell	1 reception, 62 yards
Oregon	Passing	Brock Thomas	11/15, 156 yards, TD
Oregon	Rushing	Dierre Hill	10 carries, 44 yards
Oregon	Receiving	Dakorien Moore	4 receptions, 77 yards

Knight ran for a touchdown and caught a pass for another, while the Bruins defense forced seven turnovers, as No. 21 UCLA upset the No. 13 Oregon Ducks 17–15. It ended a five-game losing streak against Oregon, and it was the Bruins' first road win against the Ducks since 2004. It was also their first win on the road against a ranked opponent since 2019. Chesney became the first coach to begin their UCLA career 5–0, and it was the program's first 5–0 start since 2022.

In the game's opening series, the Bruins drove to the Ducks two-yard line, before settling on a 21-yard field goal by Mateen Bhaghani. After Iamaleava was sacked and fumbled on the UCLA 1, the Ducks recovered the ball and scored on a one-yard run by Jordon Davison to go up 6–3. Following a sack and fumble by Oregon quarterback Dylan Raiola, Knight scored on a 35-yard run to give the Bruins a 10–6 lead. They failed to extend their lead in the first half despite outgaining the Ducks 241–58 in total yards, including a 162–36 advantage in passing yards and 79–22 in rushing. Iamaleava fumbled once and threw two interceptions. He injured his right leg late in the second quarter, which sidelined him in the second half. He was replaced by backup Ty Dieffenbach, who threw a nine-yard touchdown to Knight for a 17–6 lead with 13 minutes remaining in the game.

An Oregon touchdown with 2:16 remaining brought the score to 17–15. The Ducks attempted a two-point conversion to tie the game. Game officials spotted the ball at half the distance from the line of scrimmage. instead of spotting the ball half the distance from the end of the previous play, which had ended in a facemask penalty by the Bruins. The Bruins stopped the second two-point attempt by the Ducks from the 1-1/2 yard line. The Big Ten announced the next day that officials had made an error on the ball spot following the penalty on the two-point conversion attempt.

Knight ran for 103 yards on 22 carries and had three catches for 12 yards. Iamaleava completed 10 of 17 passes for 162 yards. Dieffenbach was three of six passing for 43 yards, one touchdown and did not turn the ball over. Raiola, starting in place of Dante Moore, completed six of 19 passes for 43 yards and two interceptions. He was replaced by third-string quarterback Brock Thomas, who was 11-of-15 passing for 156 yards, one touchdown and no turnovers.

=== vs Wisconsin ===
Wisconsin Badgers (4–1) at No. 12 UCLA Bruins (5–0) – Game summary

Quarter	1	2	3	4	Total
Badgers	0	0	7	0	7
No. 12 Bruins	3	7	0	7	17

at Rose Bowl • Pasadena, California

- Date: October 17
- Game time: 4:30 p.m.
- Game weather: Cloudy • Temperature: 85 °F (29 °C) • Wind: S at 4 miles per hour (6.4 km/h)
- Game attendance: 36,045
- Referee: Francisco Villar
- TV announcers (NBC): Noah Eagle, Todd Blackledge, and Kathryn Tappen

Game information

First quarter

- (3:07) UCLA – Mateen Bhaghani 24-yard field goal (Drive: 16 plays, 84 yards, 8:42; UCLA 3–0)

Second quarter

- (7:16) UCLA – Wayne Knight 1-yard run, Mateen Bhaghani kick (Drive: 13 plays, 91 yards, 7:34; UCLA 10–0)

Third quarter

- (8:17) WIS – Colton Joseph 3-yard run, Gavin Lahm kick (Drive: 11 plays, 44 yards, 5:50; UCLA 10–7)

Fourth quarter

- (11:31) UCLA – Anthony Woods 3-yard run, Mateen Bhaghani kick (Drive: 6 plays, 89 yards, 3:33; UCLA 17–7)

Statistics	WIS	UCLA
First downs	13	20
Plays–yards	49–214	71–384
Rushes–yards	33–148	37–120
Passing yards	66	264
Passing: comp–att–int	6–16–0	22–34–2
Time of possession	22:58	37:02

Team	Category	Player	Statistics
Wisconsin	Passing	Colton Joseph	6/16, 66 yards
Wisconsin	Rushing	Colton Joseph	18 carries, 83 yards, TD
Wisconsin	Receiving	Jaylon Domingeaux	2 receptions, 26 yards
UCLA	Passing	Ty Dieffenbach	22/33, 264 yards, INT
UCLA	Rushing	Anthony Woods	8 carries, 39 yards
UCLA	Receiving	Semaj Morgan	5 receptions, 84 yards

Dieffenbach threw for 264 yards in his first start for the Bruins, and UCLA won 17–7 over Wisconsin for their first 6–0 start since 2022. Knight and Woods both ran for touchdowns for the Bruins. Their defense held the Badgers to 214 total yards and just 66 yards passing. UCLA was the only undefeated team remaining in the Big Ten or Southeastern Conference (SEC).

=== vs Michigan State ===
Michigan State Spartans (2–5) at No. 9 UCLA Bruins (6–0) – Game summary

Quarter	1	2	3	4	Total
Spartans	7	0	0	3	10
No. 9 Bruins	0	14	14	0	28

at Rose Bowl • Pasadena, California

- Date: October 24
- Game time: 12:30 p.m.
- Game weather: Sunny • Temperature: 74 °F (23 °C) • Wind: SE at 4 miles per hour (6.4 km/h)
- Game attendance: 33,757
- Referee: Bryan Banks
- TV announcers (CBS): Brad Nessler, Charles Davis, and Jenny Dell

Game information

First quarter

- MSU – Kenneth Williams 14-yard pass from Kayd Coffman (Liam Boyd kick), 5:26. Spartans 7–0. Drive: 2 plays, 15 yards, 0:43.

Second quarter

- UCL – Jaivian Thomas 7-yard run (Mateen Bhaghani kick), 11:00. Tied 7–7. Drive: 5 plays, 19 yards, 2:01.
- UCL – Wayne Knight 1-yard run (Mateen Bhaghani kick), 3:04. Bruins 14–7. Drive: 5 plays, 21 yards, 2:32.

Third quarter

- UCL – Brian Rowe Jr. 63-yard pass from Ty Dieffenbach (Mateen Bhaghani kick), 13:00. Bruins 21–7. Drive: 4 plays, 75 yards, 1:56.
- UCL – Anthony Woods 4-yard run (Mateen Bhaghani kick), 5:27. Bruins 28–7. Drive: 10 plays, 70 yards, 5:27.

Fourth quarter

- MSU – Liam Boyd 46-yard field goal, 6:18. Bruins 28–10. Drive: 15 plays, 69 yards, 5:29.

Statistics	MSU	UCLA
First downs	11	25
Plays–yards	54–156	79–443
Rushes–yards	29–47	48–245
Passing yards	109	198
Passing: comp–att–int	13–25–2	18–31–0
Time of possession	24:02	35:58

Team	Category	Player	Statistics
Michigan State	Passing	Leo Hannan	9/15, 67 yards, INT
Michigan State	Rushing	Kenneth Williams	17 carries, 54 yards
Michigan State	Receiving	Chrishon McCray	3 receptions, 42 yards
UCLA	Passing	Ty Dieffenbach	18/31, 198 yards, TD
UCLA	Rushing	Anthony Woods	14 carries, 112 yards, TD
UCLA	Receiving	Brian Rowe Jr.	3 receptions, 74 yards, TD

The Bruins defense had four sacks and forced three turnovers, and UCLA won 28–10 over Michigan State to improve to 7–0 for the first time since 2005. Dieffenbach threw a 63-yard touchdown to Brian Rowe Jr., and the Bruins ran for three other scores. UCLA outgained Michigan State 443–156 in total yards. The Bruins rushed for 245 rushing yards on 5.1 yards per carry after failing to run for more than 150 yards in their prior two games. Woods ran for a team-high 112 yards on 14 carries, including a touchdown.

=== vs Nevada ===
Nevada Wolf Pack (3–4) at No. 7 UCLA Bruins (7–0) – Game summary

Quarter	1	2	3	4	Total
Wolf Pack	0	0	0	0	0
No. 7 Bruins	10	7	7	3	27

at Rose Bowl • Pasadena, California

- Date: October 31
- Game time: 1:15 p.m.
- Game weather: Cloudy • Temperature: 67 °F (19 °C) • Wind: SE at 4 miles per hour (6.4 km/h)
- Game attendance: 24,611
- Referee: Gregory Blum
- TV announcers (BTN): A. J. Kanell, Brett Hundley, and Emma Carpenter

Game information

First quarter
Second quarter
Third quarter
Fourth quarter

Statistics	NEV	UCLA
First downs	10	14
Plays–yards	59–176	59–303
Rushes–yards	35–65	29–125
Passing yards	111	178
Passing: comp–att–int	8–24–4	16–30–0
Time of possession	30:44	29:16

Team	Category	Player	Statistics
Nevada	Passing	AJ Bianco	6/13, 71 yards
Nevada	Rushing	Herschel Turner	11 carries, 35 yards
Nevada	Receiving	Marshaun Brown	3 receptions, 51 yards
UCLA	Passing	Ty Dieffenbach	16/30, 178 yards, 1 TD
UCLA	Rushing	Wayne Knight	11 carries, 55 yards
UCLA	Receiving	Jalen Saint Paul	3 receptions, 52 yards

UCLA's defense recorded four interceptions, including a pick-six by cornerback Derrick Barksdale in the first quarter, to win 27–0 over Nevada. It was the Bruins first shutout at the Rose Bowl since 2007. Their 8–0 record was their best start since 2005. Wolf Pack starting quarterback Luke Duncan, who backed up Iamaleava at UCLA in 2025, was intercepted on three consecutive possessions in the first quarter before being benched and replaced by AJ Bianco. Dieffenbach had one touchdown pass and ran for another, but the Bruins offense started the game slowly for the second straight week.

=== at Minnesota ===
No. 8 UCLA Bruins (8–0) at Minnesota Golden Gophers (5–3) – Game summary

Quarter	1	2	3	4	Total
No. 8 Bruins	10	0	7	17	34
Golden Gophers	0	10	0	10	20

at Huntington Bank Stadium • Minneapolis, Minnesota

- Date: November 7
- Game time: 9:00 a.m.
- Game weather: Sunny • Temperature: 44 °F (7 °C) • Wind: NE at 9 miles per hour (14 km/h)
- Game attendance: 43,841
- Referee: Mark Kluczynski
- TV announcers (FOX): Gus Johnson, Joel Klatt, and Jenny Taft

Statistics	UCLA	MINN
First downs	15	14
Plays–yards	55–466	66–296
Rushes–yards	39–163	29–91
Passing yards	303	205
Passing: comp–att–int	8–16–1	19–37–1
Turnovers	2	1
Time of possession	27:08	32:52

Team	Category	Player	Statistics
UCLA	Passing	Ty Dieffenbach	8/16, 303 yards, 3 TD
UCLA	Rushing	Wayne Knight	18 carries, 109 yards, 1 TD
UCLA	Receiving	Aidan Mizell	2 receptions, 150 yards, 2 TD
Minnesota	Passing	Drake Lindsey	19/37, 205 yards, 1 TD, 1 INT
Minnesota	Rushing	Darius Taylor	14 carries, 49 yards, 1 TD
Minnesota	Receiving	Jalen Smith	5 receptions, 85 yards

Dieffenbach threw two 75-yard touchdown passes in the fourth quarter to Aidan Mizell, and UCLA pulled away from Minnesota to win 34–20. Dieffenbach threw for a career-high 303 yards on only eight completions for three touchdowns, offsetting his interception and lost fumble. He averaged 37.9 yards per completion. Knight ran for 109 yards and a touchdown. The Bruins improved to 9–0 for the fourth time in the program's history and the first since 1998.

=== vs Illinois ===
Illinois Fighting Illini (6–3) at No. 4 UCLA Bruins (9–0) – Game summary

Quarter	1	2	3	4	Total
Fighting Illini	0	0	7	7	14
No. 4 Bruins	7	3	2	10	22

at Rose Bowl • Pasadena, California

- Date: November 13
- Game time: 6:00 p.m. PST
- Game weather: Cloudy • Temperature: 58 °F (14 °C) • Wind: SE at 4 miles per hour (6.4 km/h)
- Game attendance: 45,800
- Referee: Chris Coyte
- TV announcers (FOX): Tim Brando, Devin Gardner, and Josh Sims

Statistics	ILL	UCLA
First downs	17	17
Plays–yards	67–240	61–361
Rushes–yards	30–64	34–108
Passing yards	176	253
Passing: comp–att–int	16–37–3	16–27–1
Time of possession	30:19	29:41

Team	Category	Player	Statistics
Illinois	Passing	Katin Houser	16/34, 176 yards, 2 TD, 3 INT
Illinois	Rushing	Aidan Laughery	16 carries, 49 yards
Illinois	Receiving	Hudson Clement	3 receptions, 62 yards
UCLA	Passing	Ty Dieffenbach	13/20, 232 yards, 2 TD, 1 INT
UCLA	Rushing	Wayne Knight	18 carries, 61 yards
UCLA	Receiving	Aidan Mizell	6 receptions, 176 yards, 1 TD

Dieffenbach came back from a left elbow injury and passed for 232 yards and two touchdowns, and UCLA won 22–14 over Illinois for their third 10–0 start in program history and first since 1998. The 10 wins tied the school's single-season record. Dieffenbach left the game with 35 seconds remaining in the first half after falling on his elbow on a hit by defensive lineman Carter Janki. He returned with 55 seconds left in the third quarter, and led the Bruins on an eight-play, 75-yard drive, completing all five of his passes for 64 yards, culminating in a 26-yard touchdown pass to Morgan for a 19–7 lead. Mizell finished with six receptions for 176 yards and a touchdown, and Morgan added four catches for 56 yards. UCLA's defense had three interceptions, including two by Scooter Jackson, and they recorded a safety.

UCLA scored on the fifth play of the game on a 54-yard pass from Dieffenbach to Mizell, his third straight touchdown reception after his two 75-yard scores the previous week. Bhaghani kicked a 20-yard field goal before halftime. Midway through the third quarter, the Bruins' Aiden Gobaira sacked Illinois quarterback Katin Houser for a safety to extend the lead to 12–0. Madden Iamaleava, Nico's younger brother, filled in for Dieffenbach, but completed just three of seven passes for 21 yards as the Bruins went scoreless in three series. The Fighting Illini pulled to within 12–7, before Dieffenbach returned and extended UCLA's lead to 19–7. Houser threw a touchdown pass to Collin Dixon with 7:14 left in the game, and Illinois had chance to take the lead when Jackson intercepted Houser with 2:50 to go. Bhagnani kicked a 37-yard field goal, and the Illini were stopped on fourth down on their own 33. The loss ended Illinois' four-game winning streak. It was the 10th time the Bruins had won 10 games, the most recent in 2014.

=== at Michigan ===
No. 4 UCLA Bruins (10–0) at Michigan Wolverines (5–5) – Game summary

Quarter	1	2	3	4	OT	2OT	3OT	Total
No. 4 Bruins	0	3	0	7	3	3	0	16
Wolverines	0	3	0	7	3	3	2	18

at Michigan Stadium • Ann Arbor, Michigan

- Date: November 21
- Game time: 12:30 p.m.
- Game weather: Sunny • Temperature: 62 °F (17 °C) • Wind: S at 6 miles per hour (9.7 km/h)
- Game attendance: 109,618
- Referee: Kole Knueppel
- TV announcers (CBS): Brad Nessler, Charles Davis, and Jenny Dell

Statistics	UCLA	MICH
First downs	17	14
Plays–yards	74–296	67–247
Rushes–yards	42–107	43–120
Passing yards	189	127
Passing: comp–att–int	20–32–1	11–24–0
Time of possession	30:04	29:56

Team	Category	Player	Statistics
UCLA	Passing	Ty Dieffenbach	19/30, 188 yards, INT
UCLA	Rushing	Wayne Knight	11 carries, 30 yards
UCLA	Receiving	Wayne Knight	6 receptions, 38 yards
Michigan	Passing	Bryce Underwood	11/24, 127 yards, TD
Michigan	Rushing	Savion Hiter	26 carries, 104 yards
Michigan	Receiving	Mason Bonner	3 receptions, 47 yards, TD

Michigan quarterback Bryce Underwood threw a three-yard pass to Jalen Hoffman for a two-point conversion to beat UCLA 18–16 in triple overtime. Dieffenbach, who committed three turnovers, was injured when he was tackled on a run in the first overtime and left the field on a stretcher. The Bruins scored a field goal in each of the first two overtimes with backup Madden Iamaleava, but they were stopped in the third overtime, in which each team received a single play from the 3-yard-line for a 2-point conversion play. UCLA blew their opportunity to clinch a berth in the Big Ten championship game and strengthen their chances of a first-round bye in the playoffs; they had been No. 4 in the latest CFP rankings.

The Bruins struggled on offense for most of the game. In the second quarter, Dieffenbach was intercepted by Chris Bracy deep in the red zone. UCLA did not score until near the end of the first half, when Gobaira forced a fumble that led to a Bhaghani field goal. Late in the third quarter, Dieffenbach fumbled while attempting a throw, which the Wolverines recovered at the UCLA-19. Michigan then scored on a 6-yard touchdown pass from Underwood to tight end Mason Bonner to lead 10–3. The game went into overtime after a 15-play, 77-yard drive by the Bruins, capped by Woods taking a direct snap and throwing a 1-yard jump pass to Brayden Loftin for a touchdown with 10 seconds left in regulation.

UCLA entered the game leading the FBS with 30 takeaways. They ranked second with a turnover margin of plus-16, but were minus-2 against Michigan after forcing just one turnover. The Bruins were held to 296 total yards. Their longest play was a fake punt in the third quarter, when Anthony Sacca ran for 27 yards up the middle. Ranked nationally in the top 20 in rushing, they were limited to 107 yards on 42 carries (2.5 yards per carry), but just 80 yards on 41 attempts when excluding the fake punt. No UCLA running back ran for over 30 yards, with Knight gaining 30 yards on 11 carries, and Jaivian Thomas adding 30 yards on five attempts. Dieffenbach rushed 17 times, including four sacks, for −11 yards. The Wolverines out-rushed the Bruins 120–107.

=== vs No. TBD USC ===
No. TBD USC Trojans (8–3) at No. TBD UCLA Bruins (10–1) – Game summary

Quarter	1	2	Total
Trojans			0
Bruins			0

at Rose Bowl • Pasadena, California

- Date: November 28
- Game time: 12:30 p.m.
- TV announcers (CBS): Brad Nessler, Charles Davis and Jenny Dell

Statistics	USC	UCLA
First downs		
Plays–yards		
Rushes–yards		
Passing yards		
Passing: comp–att–int		
Time of possession		

Team	Category	Player	Statistics
USC	Passing		
USC	Rushing		
USC	Receiving		
UCLA	Passing		
UCLA	Rushing		
UCLA	Receiving		

== Personnel ==
=== Roster ===
2026 UCLA Bruins football team roster
Players
Coaches
Offense

Pos.	#	Name	Class
WR	0	Leland Smith	Sr
WR	1	Aidan Mizell	Jr
WR	2	Brian Rowe Jr.	So
RB	3	Wayne Knight	Sr
WR	4	Semaj Morgan	Sr
RB	6	Anthony Woods	Sr
WR	7	Mikey Matthews	Sr
QB	9	Nico Iamaleava (injured)	Jr
QB	10	Madden Iamaleava	Fr
WR	11	Landon Ellis	Sr
WR	12	Jace Brown	Fr
QB	14	Ty Dieffenbach	Jr
WR	15	Marcus Harris	Fr
QB	17	Colton Gumino	Fr
TE	19	Harry Lodge	Sr
WR	20	Shane Rosenthal	Fr
RB	21	Jaivian Thomas	Sr
RB	22	Dylan Lee	So
WR	23	Jackson Meehan	Sr
WR	24	Jonah Smith	Fr
RB	32	Troy Leigber	Jr
RB	33	Karson Cox	Fr
TE	44	Peter Bario	Jr
WR	48	Major Pride	Fr
OL	51	Riley Robell	Jr
OL	52	Carter Sweazie	Sr
OL	54	Derek Osman	Sr
OL	55	Eugene Brooks	So
OL	58	Jaylan Jeffers	Sr
OL	62	Michael Price	Fr
OL	64	Sam Yoon	Sr
OL	65	Hall Schmidt	Sr
OL	66	Jensen Somerville	So
OL	67	Camden Jensen	Fr
OL	68	Jordan Davis	Sr
OL	69	Cooper Javorsky	Fr
OL	70	Caleb Walker	Sr
OL	71	Sean Na'a	Jr
OL	72	K.D. Arnold	Sr
OL	73	Quinn Buckey	Fr
OL	74	Julian Armella	Sr
OL	75	Nehemiah Johnson	Fr
OL	76	Mack Indestad	Sr
OL	77	JD Rayner	Fr
OL	78	Michael McDonald	So
WR	81	Kenneth Moore III	Fr
TE	82	Noah Fox-Flores	So
WR	83	Russell Weir	So
TE	85	Brayden Loftin	Sr
WR	86	Jalen Saint Paul	So
TE	87	Dylan Sims	Fr
TE	88	Stevie Amar Jr.	Fr
TE	89	Joshua Phifer	Jr

Defense

Pos.	#	Name	Class
LB	0	Donavyn Pellot	Jr
DB	1	Scooter Jackson	Sr
DB	2	Rodrick Pleasant	Jr
DB	3	Robert Stafford III	Jr
DB	4	Cole Martin	Jr
DB	6	Tao Johnson	Sr
DB	7	Aaron Williams	Jr
LB	9	Jalen Woods	Sr
LB	10	Sammy Omosigho	Sr
DL	11	Nico Davillier	Sr
DB	12	Malik Hartford	Jr
DB	14	LaRue Zamorano III	Fr
DL	15	Sahir West	So
DL	17	Lucien Holland	Fr
DB	18	Osiris Gilbert	So
DL	19	Ryan McCulloch	Jr
LB	20	Scott Taylor	So
DB	21	Dante Lovett	Jr
DB	22	Ty Lee	Jr
DB	23	Jhase McMillan	So
DL	24	Cole Cogshell	So
LB	25	Trent Hendrick	Sr
DB	25	Kuron Jabari Jr.	Fr
DB	26	CJ Lavender	Fr
DB	27	Ta'Shawn James	Jr
DB	29	Robert James III	Fr
DB	30	Zeke Johnson	Fr
DB	31	Chase Coleman	Fr
DB	32	Derrick Barksdale	Sr
DL	35	Dallin Havea	So
DB	35	Logan Hirou	Fr
LB	36	Wyatt Mosier	Jr
DB	37	Joshua Dixon	Jr
LB	39	Anthony Sacca	Fr
LB	40	Mone Malafu	Jr
LB	41	Jewelous "JuJu" Walls	So
LB	43	Brett Barry	So
DL	44	Ashton Sanders	Jr
DB	45	Jamier Johnson	Sr
LB	49	Malaki Soliai-Tui	Fr
LB	53	Jacob Reis	So
DL	54	Tyler Partlow	Fr
DL	55	A.J. Fuimaono	Jr
LB	56	Drew Spinogatti	Sr
LB	57	Matthew Muasau	Fr
DL	59	Gavin Blum	So
DL	88	Grant Buckey	Jr
DL	90	Amier Washington	Jr
DL	92	Darold DeNgohe	Jr
DL	94	Marcus Almada	Fr
DL	95	Tyson Ford	Jr
DL	97	Aiden Gobaira	Sr
DL	99	Maxwell Roy	Fr

Special teams

Pos.	#	Name	Class
K	15	Mateen Bhaghani	Sr
P	19	Lennox Miller	Fr
LS	30	Halakilangi Muagututi'a	Fr
K	31	Mateo Orosco	Fr
P	35	Curtis Gerrand	So
LS	44	Giancarlo Cereghino	Fr
P	45	Chase Barry	Sr
LS	50	Salem Abdul-Wahab	Sr

Head coach

- Bob Chesney

Coordinators/assistant coaches

- Colin Hitschler – Defensive coordinator
- Dean Kennedy – Offensive coordinator
- Drew Canan – Special teams coordinator/tight ends
- Chris Smith – Offensive line/run game coordinator
- Colin Lockett – Wide receivers
- A.J. Steward – Running backs
- Vic So'oto – Linebackers
- Legi Suiaunoa – Defensive line
- Anthony DiMichele – Safeties
- Eddie Whitley Jr. – Defensive backs
- Sam Daniels – Defensive ends
- Gabe Lynn – Nickels

Legend

- (C) Team captain
- (S) Suspended
- (I) Ineligible
- Injured
- Redshirt

Roster
Last update: January 21, 2026

== Statistics ==
=== Team ===
	UCLA	Opp
Points per game		
Total		
First downs		
Rushing		
Passing		
Penalty		
Rushing yards		
Avg per rush		
Avg per game		
Rushing touchdowns		
Passing yards		
Att-Comp-Int		
Avg per pass		
Avg per game		
Passing touchdowns		
Total offense		
Avg per play		
Avg per game		
Fumbles-Lost		
Penalties-Yards		
Avg per game		
Punts-Yards		
Avg per punt		
Time of possession/Game		
3rd down conversions		
3rd Down Pct.		
4th down conversions		
4th Down Pct.		
Sacks-Yards		
Touchdowns scored		
Field goals-Attempts		
PAT-Attempts		

=== Individual leaders ===
==== Offense ====
Passing statistics
#	NAME	POS	RAT	CMP	ATT	YDS	AVG/G	CMP%	TD	INT	LONG

Rushing statistics
#	NAME	POS	ATT	GAIN	AVG	TD	LONG	AVG/G

Receiving statistics
#	NAME	POS	CTH	YDS	AVG	TD	LONG	AVG/G

==== Defense ====
Defense statistics

Key: POS: Position, SOLO: Solo Tackles, AST: Assisted Tackles, TOT: Total Tackles, TFL: Tackles-for-loss, SACK: Quarterback Sacks, INT: Interceptions, BU: Passes Broken Up, PD: Passes Defended, QBH: Quarterback Hits, FR: Fumbles Recovered, FF: Forced Fumbles, BLK: Kicks or Punts Blocked, SAF: Safeties, TD : Touchdown

==== Special teams ====
Kicking statistics

Kickoff statistics
#	NAME	POS	KICKS	YDS	AVG	TB	OB

Punting statistics
#	NAME	POS	PUNTS	YDS	AVG	LONG	TB	FC	I–20	50+	BLK

Kick return statistics
#	NAME	POS	RTNS	YDS	AVG	TD	LNG

Punt return statistics
#	NAME	POS	RTNS	YDS	AVG	TD	LONG

=== Scoring ===
==== UCLA vs. non-conference opponents ====
	1	2	3	4	Total
UCLA	7	17	0	21	45
Opponents	7	10	7	0	24

==== UCLA vs. Big Ten opponents ====
	1	2	3	4	Total
UCLA	0	0	0	0	0
Opponents	0	0	0	0	0

==== UCLA vs. all opponents ====
	1	2	3	4	Total
UCLA	7	17	0	21	45
Opponents	7	10	7	0	24

== Awards and honors ==
Recipient	Award (Big-Ten Conference)	Week #	Date awarded	Ref.
Ta'shawn James	Co-Defensive Player of the Week	1	September 7, 2026	
Sammy Omosigho	Defensive Player of the Week	3	September 21, 2026	
Jalen Woods	Defensive Player of the Week	6	October 12, 2026	
Ty Dieffenbach	Offensive Player of the Week	10	November 9, 2026	

- September 9, 2026 – Wayne Knight, Paul Hornung Award Player of the Week; Sammy Omosigho, Bednarik Award Player of the Week; Ta'shawn James, Thorpe Award Defensive Back of the Week
- September 22, 2026 – Wayne Knight named Paul Hornung Award Player of the Week
- October 13, 2026 – Colin Hitschler was named East–West Shrine Bowl Coach of the Week
- October 21, 2026 – Bob Chesney was named to the Paul “Bear” Bryant Coach of the Year Award watch list
- October 29, 2026 – Sammy Omosigho was named on the semifinalist list of the 2026 Butkus Award
- November 10, 2026 – Sammy Omosigho is a semifinalist for the Chuck Bednarik Award
- November 19, 2026 – Sammy Omosigho is a finalist for the Lombardi Award
