= 2026 Illinois Fighting Illini football team =

American college football season

2026 Illinois Fighting Illini football
- Conference: Big Ten Conference
- Record: 6–5 (4–4 Big Ten)
- Head coach: Bret Bielema (6th season)
- Offensive coordinator: Barry Lunney Jr. (5th season)
- Offensive scheme: Spread
- Defensive coordinator: Bobby Hauck (1st season; first 4 games)
- Base defense: 3–3–5
- Home stadium: Gies Memorial Stadium

2026 Big Ten Conference football standings
| | Conf. | | | Overall |
| Team | W | | L | W | | L |
|---|---|---|---|---|---|---|
| No. 4 UCLA | 7 | – | 1 | 10 | – | 1 |
| No. 8 Indiana | 6 | – | 2 | 9 | – | 2 |
| No. 15 Iowa | 6 | – | 2 | 9 | – | 2 |
| No. 13 Oregon | 6 | – | 2 | 8 | – | 3 |
| No. 18 USC | 5 | – | 3 | 8 | – | 3 |
| No. 14 Ohio State | 5 | – | 3 | 7 | – | 4 |
| Wisconsin | 5 | – | 3 | 7 | – | 4 |
| Nebraska | 4 | – | 4 | 7 | – | 4 |
| Washington | 4 | – | 4 | 7 | – | 4 |
| Illinois | 4 | – | 4 | 6 | – | 5 |
| Minnesota | 4 | – | 4 | 6 | – | 5 |
| Michigan | 3 | – | 5 | 6 | – | 5 |
| Northwestern | 3 | – | 5 | 6 | – | 5 |
| Penn State | 3 | – | 5 | 6 | – | 5 |
| Maryland | 2 | – | 6 | 4 | – | 7 |
| Purdue | 2 | – | 6 | 3 | – | 8 |
| Rutgers | 2 | – | 6 | 3 | – | 8 |
| Michigan State | 1 | – | 7 | 3 | – | 8 |
Championship: December 5, 2026
^ – College Football Playoff participant; $ – Conference champion; y – Championship game participant; As of November 22, 2026; Rankings from CFP rankings

The 2026 Illinois Fighting Illini football team is who represents the University of Illinois Urbana-Champaign as they are a member of the Big Ten Conference during the 2026 NCAA Division I FBS football season. The program is led by sixth-year head coach Bret Bielema, the Fighting Illini play their home games at Gies Memorial Stadium at Champaign, Illinois.

== NFL draft ==
| Name | Pos. | Team | Round | Pick |
|---|---|---|---|---|
| Gabe Jacas | DE | New England Patriots | 2 | 55 |
| J. C. Davis | T | New York Giants | 6 | 192 |
| Miles Scott | S | Denver Broncos | 7 | 246 |

== Outgoing transfers ==
| Name | No. | Pos. | Height | Weight | Year | Hometown | New school |
|---|---|---|---|---|---|---|---|
| Justin Bowick | 0 | WR | 6'4" | 210 | Jr | Powder Springs, GA | Oklahoma State |
| Kaleb Patterson | 1 | DB | 6'1" | 195 | Jr | Jackson, MS | Kansas State |
| Mario Sanders II | 1 | WR | 5'10" | 195 | Jr | Minneapolis, MN | Southern Miss |
| Ashton Hollins | 2 | WR | 6'5" | 195 | Jr | Lucedale, MS | Georgia Southern |
| Saboor Karriem | 2 | DB | 6'3" | 210 | Jr | West Orange, NJ | Temple |
| Alexander Capka-Jones | 7 | WR | 6'4" | 195 | Sr | Oak Park, CA | |
| Malik Elzy | 8 | WR | 6'2" | 215 | So | Chicago, IL | LSU |
| Jeremiah Warren | 8 | DL | 6'3" | 310 | So | Belleville, MI | Pitt |
| Ethan Hampton | 10 | QB | 6'3" | 230 | Jr | Elburn, IL | Southern Miss |
| Donovan Turner | 11 | DB | 6'2" | 190 | Jr | Long Beach, CA | Sacramento State |
| Trey Petty | 12 | QB | 6'0" | 205 | Rs-Fr | Starkville, MS | Western Michigan |
| Amar Reynolds | 12 | DB | 6'0" | 190 | Rs-Fr | Fort Pierce, FL | FAU |
| Cole Rusk | 14 | TE | 6'5" | 250 | Sr | Rock Island, IL | Arizona |
| Tyson Rooks | 19 | DB | 6'4" | 205 | Jr | St. Simons Island, GA | FAU |
| David Olano | 24 | K | 5'11" | 180 | Jr | Naperville, IL | Texas A&M |
| Vernon Woodward III | 24 | CB | 6'1" | 200 | Rs-Fr | DeLand, FL | Jacksonville State |
| Aaron Ball | 25 | RB | 5'11" | 205 | Rs-Fr | Chicago, IL | Indiana State |
| Jojo Hayden | 30 | LB | 6'2" | 245 | So | East St. Louis, IL | Purdue |
| Tomiwa Durojaiye | 36 | DL | 6'5" | 300 | Jr | Philadelphia, PA | South Carolina |
| Angelo McCullom | 44 | DL | 6'2" | 300 | So | Pickerington, OH | Texas A&M |
| Malachi Hood | 45 | LB | 6'2" | 235 | Jr | Plainfield, IL | West Virginia |
| Easton Baker | 47 | LB | 6'0" | 220 | Rs-Fr | Stansbury, UT | |
| Harrysson Ngassa | 49 | LB | 6'2" | 215 | Rs-Fr | Chicago, IL | South Florida |
| Clayton Leonard | 51 | LB | 6'4" | 250 | Jr | Danforth, IL | Southeast Missouri State |
| Kellen Francis | 65 | OL | 6'5" | 320 | So | Princeville, IL | |
| Tyler McMillan | 70 | OL | 6'5" | 335 | Jr | Detroit, MI | Eastern Michigan |
| Jake Furtney | 82 | TE | 6'4" | 250 | Rs-Fr | St. Charles, IL | Ohio |
| Tysean Griffin | 83 | WR | 5'10" | 180 | Rs-Fr | Chicago, IL | Western Illinois |
| Eli Coenen | 96 | DL | 6'7" | 290 | So | Baldwin, WI | Michigan State |
| Curt Neal | 99 | DL | 6'0" | 310 | Jr | Cornelius, NC | Purdue |

== Coaching departures ==
| Name | Previous Position | New Position |
|---|---|---|
| Aaron Henry | Illinois – Defensive coordinator | Notre Dame – Co-defensive coordinator & defensive backs coach |

== Acquisitions ==
=== Incoming transfers ===
| Name | No. | Pos. | Height | Weight | Year | Hometown | Prev. school |
|---|---|---|---|---|---|---|---|
| Jayshon Platt | 1 | WR | 6'1" | 180 | Sr | Sarasota, FL | FAU |
| Katin Houser | 4 | QB | 6'3" | 225 | Sr | Anaheim, CA | East Carolina |
| Alex Perry | 9 | WR | 6'5" | 210 | Sr | Port Charlotte, FL | FIU |
| Lavon Williams | 9 | S | 5'10" | 180 | Sr | San Antonio, TX | East Texas A&M |
| Ty Robinson | 10 | WR | 6'4" | 190 | Sr | Aurora, CO | Ball State |
| Maurice Smith Jr. | 14 | QB | 6'4" | 245 | Sr | Fort Pierce, FL | Chowan |
| Isaiah Thomison | 17 | DL | 6'3" | 280 | Jr | Fayetteville, TN | Bowling Green |
| Deuce Fillmore | 22 | CB | 5'11" | 185 | Sr | Biloxi, MS | Georgia State |
| William Holmes | 24 | EDGE | 6'4" | 245 | Jr | Detroit, MI | Utah State |
| Ethan Moczulski | 37 | K | 5'11 | 200 | Sr | Spokane, WA | Washington |
| Robert Edmonson | 45 | LB | 6'2" | 225 | Jr | Houston, TX | Colorado State |
| Zach Haber | 49 | LS | 5'10" | 226 | Jr | Durango, CO | Arkansas |
| Jake Renfro | 59 | IOL | 6'4" | 315 | Jr | Mokena, IL | Wisconsin |
| Christian Martin | 72 | OT | 6'6" | 300 | Jr | St. Rose, LA | Colorado State |
| Eddie Kasper | 83 | WR | 5'10" | 160 | Sr | Burlington, WI | Illinois State |
| Carter Janki | 90 | DL | 6'5" | 290 | Sr | Redding, CT | Penn |
| Connor Sullivan | 94 | DL | 6'4" | 270 | Rs-Fr | Glenview, IL | Washington State |
| Darrell Prater | 96 | DL | 6'3" | 300 | Sr | Fort Payne, AL | Jacksonville State |
| James Finley | | S | 6'1" | 185 | So | Portage, IN | Northern Illinois |

=== Coaches acquisitions ===
| Name | Previous Position | New Position |
|---|---|---|
| Bobby Hauck | Montana – Head Coach | Illinois – Defensive coordinator |

== Schedule ==
| Date | Time | Opponent | Site | TV | Result | Attendance |
|---|---|---|---|---|---|---|
| September 3 | 8:00 p.m. | UAB* | Gies Memorial Stadium; Champaign, IL | BTN | W 42–23 | 52,673 |
| September 12 | 2:30 p.m. | Duke* | Gies Memorial Stadium; Champaign, IL | FS1 | L 27–31 | 60,670 |
| September 19 | 1:00 p.m. | No. 24 (FCS) Southern Illinois* | Gies Memorial Stadium; Champaign, IL | Peacock | W 48–10 | 60,670 |
| September 26 | 11:00 a.m. | at No. 7 Ohio State | Ohio Stadium; Columbus, OH (Illibuck) | FOX | L 19–42 | 101,452 |
| October 3 | 3:15 p.m. | Purdue^{†} | Gies Memorial Stadium; Champaign, IL (Purdue Cannon) | BTN | L 17–24 | 60,670 |
| October 10 | 2:30 p.m. | at Michigan State | Spartan Stadium; East Lansing, MI | FS1 | W 38–37 ^{OT} | 65,837 |
| October 24 | 2:00 p.m. | Oregon | Gies Memorial Stadium; Champaign, IL | BTN | W 21–10 | 58,723 |
| October 31 | 11:00 a.m. | at Maryland | SECU Stadium; College Park, MD | FS1 | W 20–17 | 27,207 |
| November 6 | 7:00 p.m. | Nebraska | Gies Memorial Stadium; Champaign, IL | FOX | W 24–13 | 58,587 |
| November 13 | 8:00 p.m. | at No. 4 UCLA | Rose Bowl; Pasadena, CA | FOX | L 14–22 | 45,800 |
| November 21 | 1:30 p.m. | No. 15 Iowa | Gies Memorial Stadium; Champaign, IL (rivalry) | BTN | L 17–34 | 60,670 |
| November 28 | 11:30 a.m. | at Northwestern | Ryan Field; Evanston, IL (Land of Lincoln Trophy) | BTN | | |
*Non-conference game; ^{†}Homecoming; Rankings from AP Poll (and CFP Rankings, after November 3) – Released prior to game; All times are in Central time; Source:

== Game summaries ==
=== vs UAB ===
UAB Blazers (0–0) at Illinois Fighting Illini (0–0) – Game summary

| Quarter | 1 | 2 | 3 | 4 | Total |
|---|---|---|---|---|---|
| Blazers | 3 | 10 | 3 | 7 | 23 |
| Fighting Illini | 14 | 7 | 7 | 14 | 42 |

at Gies Memorial Stadium • Champaign, Illinois

- Date: September 3
- Game time: 8:00 p.m. CST
- Game weather: Clear • Temperature: 82 °F (28 °C) • Wind: S at 4 miles per hour (6.4 km/h)
- Game attendance: 52,673
- Referee: Jason Nickelby
- TV announcers (BTN): Mark Followill, Rhett Lewis, and Caroline Hendershot

Game information

First quarter

- ILL – Collin Dixon 18-yard pass from Katin Houser (Ethan Moczulski kick), 7:55. Fighting Illini 7–0. Drive: 3 plays, 30 yards, 1:03.
- UAB – Jonah Delange 26-yard field goal, 2:24. Fighting Illini 7–3. Drive: 12 plays, 67 yards, 5:31.
- ILL – Ca'Lil Valentine 51-yard run (Ethan Moczulski kick), 1:18. Fighting Illini 14–3. Drive: 3 plays, 75 yards, 1:06.

Second quarter

- UAB – Jonah Delange 23-yard field goal, 5:50. Fighting Illini 14–6. Drive: 6 plays, 27 yards, 3:23.
- UAB – Roderick Robinson II 10-yard pass from Ryder Burton (Jonah Delange kick), 0:18. Fighting Illini 14–13. Drive: 10 plays, 50 yards, 2:45.
- ILL – Ty Robinson 54-yard pass from Katin Houser (Ethan Moczulski kick), 0:00. Fighting Illini 21–13. Drive: 3 plays, 66 yards, 0:13.

Third quarter

- ILL – Collin Dixon 14-yard pass from Katin Houser (Ethan Moczulski kick), 10:15. Fighting Illini 28–13. Drive: 11 plays, 75 yards, 4:45.
- UAB – Jonah Delange 35-yard field goal, 3:58. Fighting Illini 28–16. Drive: 11 plays, 58 yards, 6:17.

Fourth quarter

- ILL – Katin Houser 6-yard run (Ethan Moczulski kick), 12:25. Fighting Illini 35–16. Drive: 13 plays, 75 yards, 6:33.
- ILL – Ismael Kante 59-yard interception return (Ethan Moczulski kick), 5:48. Fighting Illini 42–16.
- UAB – Ryder Burton 5-yard run (Jonah Delange kick), 0:09. Fighting Illini 42–23. Drive: 12 plays, 75 yards, 5:39.

| Statistics | UAB | ILL |
|---|---|---|
| First downs | 24 | 17 |
| Plays–yards | 79–413 | 43–332 |
| Rushes–yards | 48–194 | 26–150 |
| Passing yards | 219 | 182 |
| Passing: comp–att–int | 18–31–1 | 13–17–0 |
| Turnovers | 1 | 0 |
| Time of possession | 41:03 | 18:57 |

| Team | Category | Player | Statistics |
|---|---|---|---|
| UAB | Passing | Ryder Burton | 18/31, 219 yards, TD, INT |
| UAB | Rushing | Roderick Robinson II | 14 carries, 59 yards |
| UAB | Receiving | CJ Smith | 2 receptions, 57 yards |
| Illinois | Passing | Katin Houser | 13/17, 182 yards, 3 TD |
| Illinois | Rushing | Ca'Lil Valentine | 11 carries, 88 yards, TD |
| Illinois | Receiving | Collin Dixon | 6 receptions, 70 yards, 2 TD |

=== vs Duke ===
Duke Blue Devils (1–0) at Illinois Fighting Illini (1–0) – Game summary

| Quarter | 1 | 2 | 3 | 4 | Total |
|---|---|---|---|---|---|
| Blue Devils | 7 | 14 | 7 | 3 | 31 |
| Fighting Illini | 10 | 14 | 3 | 0 | 27 |

at Gies Memorial Stadium • Champaign, Illinois

- Date: September 12
- Game time: 2:30 p.m. CST
- Game weather: Sunny • Temperature: 86 °F (30 °C) • Wind: W at 7 miles per hour (11 km/h)
- Game attendance: 60,670
- Referee: Tim Hedgepeth
- TV announcers (FS1): Jack Kizer and Mark Helfrich

Game information

First quarter

- ILL – Collin Dixon 13-yard pass from Katin Houser (Ethan Moczulski kick), 10:23. Fighting Illini 7–0. Drive: 8 plays, 75 yards, 4:37.
- DUKE – Jonah Burton 12-yard pass from Walker Eget (Cosme Salas kick), 8:28. Tied 7–7. Drive: 4 plays, 75 yards, 1:55.
- ILL – Ethan Moczulski 51-yard field goal, 3:41. Fighting Illini 10–7. Drive: 11 plays, 43 yards, 4:47.

Second quarter

- ILL – Collin Dixon 40-yard pass from Katin Houser (Ethan Moczulski kick), 12:47. Fighting Illini 17–7. Drive: 8 plays, 62 yards, 3:49.
- DUKE – Nate Sheppard 2-yard run (Cosme Salas kick), 7:05. Fighting Illini 17–14. Drive: 12 plays, 75 yards, 5:42.
- ILL – Collin Dixon 2-yard pass from Katin Houser (Ethan Moczulski kick), 1:48. Fighting Illini 24–14. Drive: 11 plays, 75 yards, 5:17.
- DUKE – Nate Sheppard 7-yard pass from Walker Eget (Cosme Salas kick), 0:38. Fighting Illini 24–21. Drive: 8 plays, 75 yards, 1:10.

Third quarter

- DUKE – Nate Sheppard 3-yard pass from Walker Eget (Cosme Salas kick), 10:47. Blue Devils 28–24. Drive: 9 plays, 75 yards, 4:13.
- ILL – Ethan Moczulski 47-yard field goal, 5:08. Blue Devils 28–27. Drive: 11 plays, 46 yards, 5:39.

Fourth quarter

- DUKE – Cosme Salas 39-yard field goal, 13:53. Blue Devils 31–27. Drive: 10 plays, 53 yards, 6:15.

| Statistics | DUKE | ILL |
|---|---|---|
| First downs | 19 | 23 |
| Plays–yards | 57–376 | 68–382 |
| Rushes–yards | 35–170 | 32–111 |
| Passing yards | 206 | 271 |
| Passing: comp–att–int | 15–22–0 | 24–36–1 |
| Turnovers | 0 | 1 |
| Time of possession | 26:46 | 33:14 |

| Team | Category | Player | Statistics |
|---|---|---|---|
| Duke | Passing | Walker Eget | 15/21, 206 yards, 3 TD |
| Duke | Rushing | Nate Sheppard | 24 carries, 147 yards, TD |
| Duke | Receiving | Jonah Burton | 4 receptions, 78 yards, TD |
| Illinois | Passing | Katin Houser | 24/35, 271 yards, 3 TD, INT |
| Illinois | Rushing | Ca'Lil Valentine | 18 carries, 56 yards |
| Illinois | Receiving | Collin Dixon | 11 receptions, 166 yards, 3 TD |

=== vs No. 24 (FCS) Southern Illinois ===
No. 24 (FCS) Southern Illinois Salukis (2–1) at Illinois Fighting Illini (1–1) – Game summary

| Quarter | 1 | 2 | 3 | 4 | Total |
|---|---|---|---|---|---|
| No. 24 (FCS) Salukis | 7 | 3 | 0 | 0 | 10 |
| Fighting Illini | 14 | 17 | 0 | 17 | 48 |

at Gies Memorial Stadium • Champaign, Illinois

- Date: September 19
- Game time: 1:00 p.m. CST
- Game weather: Cloudy • Temperature: 77 °F (25 °C) • Wind: SE at 3 miles per hour (4.8 km/h)
- Game attendance: 60,670
- Referee: Jason Gant
- TV announcers (Peacock): Paul Burmeister, Ian Book, and Ashley ShahAhmadi

| Statistics | SIU | ILL |
|---|---|---|
| First downs | 18 | 21 |
| Plays–yards | 69–257 | 57–503 |
| Rushes–yards | 27–29 | 28–198 |
| Passing yards | 228 | 305 |
| Passing: comp–att–int | 22–42–1 | 23–29–1 |
| Turnovers | 1 | 1 |
| Time of possession | 34:06 | 25:54 |

| Team | Category | Player | Statistics |
|---|---|---|---|
| Southern Illinois | Passing | DJ Williams | 20/38, 182 yards, TD, INT |
| Southern Illinois | Rushing | Jake Curry | 4 carries, 22 yards |
| Southern Illinois | Receiving | Kyle Thomas | 6 receptions, 77 yards |
| Illinois | Passing | Katin Houser | 23/29, 305 yards, 2 TD, INT |
| Illinois | Rushing | Aidan Laughery | 4 carries, 93 yards, TD |
| Illinois | Receiving | Collin Dixon | 8 receptions, 131 yards, 2 TD |

=== at No. 7 Ohio State (Illibuck) ===
Illinois Fighting Illini (2–1) at No. 7 Ohio State Buckeyes (2–1) – Game summary

| Quarter | 1 | 2 | 3 | 4 | Total |
|---|---|---|---|---|---|
| Fighting Illini | 7 | 3 | 3 | 6 | 19 |
| No. 7 Buckeyes | 14 | 14 | 0 | 14 | 42 |

at Ohio Stadium • Columbus, Ohio

- Date: September 26
- Game time: 11:00 a.m. CST
- Game weather: Sunny • Temperature: 66 °F (19 °C) • Wind: NE at 10 miles per hour (16 km/h)
- Game attendance: 101,452
- Referee: Francisco Villar
- TV announcers (FOX): Gus Johnson (play-by-play), Joel Klatt (analyst), and Jenny Taft (sideline reporter)

| Statistics | ILL | OSU |
|---|---|---|
| First downs | 25 | 27 |
| Plays–yards | 71–462 | 68–518 |
| Rushes–yards | 33–199 | 32–151 |
| Passing yards | 263 | 367 |
| Passing: comp–att–int | 21–38–0 | 27–36–0 |
| Turnovers | 0 | 0 |
| Time of possession | 30:38 | 29:22 |

| Team | Category | Player | Statistics |
|---|---|---|---|
| Illinois | Passing | Katin Houser | 21/37, 263 yards, TD |
| Illinois | Rushing | Aidan Laughery | 11 carries, 113 yards |
| Illinois | Receiving | Hudson Clement | 5 receptions, 87 yards |
| Ohio State | Passing | Julian Sayin | 27/36, 367 yards, 4 TD |
| Ohio State | Rushing | Ja'Kobi Jackson | 10 carries, 56 yards, TD |
| Ohio State | Receiving | Jeremiah Smith | 12 receptions, 217 yards, 4 TD |

=== vs Purdue ===
Purdue Boilermakers (1–3) at Illinois Fighting Illini (2–2) – Game summary

| Quarter | 1 | 2 | 3 | 4 | Total |
|---|---|---|---|---|---|
| Boilermakers | 3 | 10 | 3 | 8 | 24 |
| Fighting Illini | 0 | 7 | 0 | 10 | 17 |

at Gies Memorial Stadium • Champaign, Illinois

- Date: October 3
- Game time: 3:15 p.m. CST
- Game weather: Sunny • Temperature: 66 °F (19 °C)
- Game attendance: 60,670
- Referee: Jeff Servinski
- TV announcers (BTN): Chris Vosters (play-by-play), Anthony Herron (analyst), and Dannie Rogers (sideline)

| Statistics | PUR | ILL |
|---|---|---|
| First downs | 19 | 26 |
| Plays–yards | 60 – 345 | 64–345 |
| Rushes–yards | 33–90 | 27–120 |
| Passing yards | 255 | 225 |
| Passing: comp–att–int | 18–27–0 | 21–37–1 |
| Time of possession | 31:33 | 28:27 |

| Team | Category | Player | Statistics |
|---|---|---|---|
| Purdue | Passing | Ryan Browne | 18/27, 255 yards, 1 TD |
| Purdue | Rushing | Fame Ijeboi | 19 carries, 65 yards |
| Purdue | Receiving | Asaad Waseem | 3 carries, 98 yards |
| Illinois | Passing | Katin Houser | 21/37, 225 yards, 2 TD, 1 INT |
| Illinois | Rushing | Aidan Laughery | 12, 49 yards |
| Illinois | Receiving | Collin Dixon | 10, 116 yards, 1 TD |

=== at Michigan State ===
Illinois Fighting Illini (2–3) at Michigan State Spartans (2–3) – Game summary

| Quarter | 1 | 2 | 3 | 4 | OT | Total |
|---|---|---|---|---|---|---|
| Fighting Illini | 10 | 10 | 3 | 8 | 7 | 38 |
| Spartans | 0 | 7 | 10 | 14 | 6 | 37 |

at Spartan Stadium • East Lansing, Michigan

- Date: October 10
- Game time: 2:30 p.m. CST
- Game weather: Sunny • Temperature: 77 °F (25 °C) • Wind: SE at 14 miles per hour (23 km/h)
- Game attendance: 65,837
- Referee: Mark Kluczynski
- TV announcers (FS1): Connor Onion (play-by-play) and Spencer Tillman (analyst)

Game information

First quarter

- ILL – Ethan Moczulski 40-yard field goal, 11:46. Fighting Illini 3–0. Drive: 7 plays, 54 yards, 3:14.
- ILL – Aidan Laughery 5-yard pass from Katin Houser (Ethan Moczulski kick), 3:21. Fighting Illini 10–0. Drive: 11 plays, 80 yards, 6:51.

Second quarter

- ILL – Katin Houser 2-yard run (Ethan Moczulski kick), 8:57. Fighting Illini 17–0. Drive: 14 plays, 82 yards, 7:18.
- MSU – Jaziun Patterson 6-yard pass from Alessio Milivojevic (Liam Boyd kick), 3:29. Fighting Illini 17–7. Drive: 11 plays, 75 yards, 5:28.
- ILL – Ethan Moczulski 35-yard field goal, 0:00. Fighting Illini 20–7. Drive: 12 plays, 58 yards, 3:29.

Third quarter

- ILL – Ethan Moczulski 38-yard field goal, 8:48. Fighting Illini 23–7. Drive: 8 plays, 30 yards, 3:16.
- MSU – Liam Boyd 42-yard field goal, 2:52. Fighting Illini 23–10. Drive: 10 plays, 64 yards, 5:52.
- MSU – Jaziun Patterson 11-yard run (Liam Boyd kick), 1:30. Fighting Illini 23–17. Drive: 1 plays, 11 yards, 0:11.

Fourth quarter

- ILL – Collin Dixon 14-yard pass from Michael Clayton II (Aidan Laughery rush), 13:14. Fighting Illini 31–17. Drive: 7 plays, 75 yards, 3:16.
- MSU – Fredrick Moore 24-yard pass from Alessio Milivojevic (Liam Boyd kick), 7:47. Fighting Illini 31–24. Drive: 10 plays, 75 yards, 3:16.
- MSU – Jaziun Patterson 2-yard run (Liam Boyd kick), 1:17. Tied 31–31. Drive: 6 plays, 33 yards, 2:10.

Overtime

- ILL – Hudson Clement 25-yard pass from Michael Clayton II (Ethan Moczulski kick), 0:00. Fighting Illini 38–31. Drive: 1 plays, 25 yards, 0:00.
- MSU – Jaziun Patterson 1-yard run (pass failed), 0:00. Fighting Illini 38–37. Drive: 5 plays, 25 yards, 0:00.

| Statistics | ILL | MSU |
|---|---|---|
| First downs | 25 | 19 |
| Plays–yards | 70–409 | 54–342 |
| Rushes–yards | 33–127 | 27–127 |
| Passing yards | 282 | 215 |
| Passing: comp–att–int | 26–37–1 | 23–27–0 |
| Time of possession | 33:52 | 26:08 |

| Team | Category | Player | Statistics |
|---|---|---|---|
| Illinois | Passing | Katin Houser | 20/29, 194 yards, 1 TD, 1 INT |
| Illinois | Rushing | Aidan Laughery | 17 carries, 70 yards |
| Illinois | Receiving | Hudson Clement | 6 receptions, 105 yards, 1TD |
| Michigan State | Passing | Alessio Milivojevic | 22/26, 196 yards, 2 TD |
| Michigan State | Rushing | Jaziun Patterson | 18 carries, 92 yards, 2 TD |
| Michigan State | Receiving | Jayden Savoury | 6 receptions, 49 yards |

=== vs Oregon ===
Oregon Ducks (4–2) at Illinois Fighting Illini (3–3) – Game summary

| Quarter | 1 | 2 | 3 | 4 | Total |
|---|---|---|---|---|---|
| Ducks | 7 | 3 | 0 | 0 | 10 |
| Fighting Illini | 0 | 7 | 7 | 7 | 21 |

at Gies Memorial Stadium • Champaign, Illinois

- Date: October 24
- Game time: 2:01 PM
- Game weather: Sunny, 72 degrees
- Game attendance: 58,723
- Referee: Gregory Blum
- TV announcers (BTN): Chris Vosters (play-by-play), Jake Butt (analyst), and Brooke Fletcher (sideline)

| Statistics | ORE | ILL |
|---|---|---|
| First downs | 21 | 15 |
| Plays–yards | 426 | 314 |
| Rushes–yards | 180 | 225 |
| Passing yards | 246 | 89 |
| Passing: comp–att–int | 27/41 0 INT | 12/19 0 INT |
| Turnovers | 1 | 1 |
| Time of possession | 29:15 | 30:45 |

| Team | Category | Player | Statistics |
|---|---|---|---|
| Oregon | Passing | Dylan Raiola | 27/41, 246 yards |
| Oregon | Rushing | Jordon Davison | 14 carries, 92 yards, 1 TD |
| Oregon | Receiving | Dakorien Moore | 9 receptions, 70 yards |
| Illinois | Passing | Michael Clayton II | 11/18, 84 yards, 2 TD |
| Illinois | Rushing | Aidan Laughery | 13 carries, 123 yards, 1 TD |
| Illinois | Receiving | Collin Dixon | 6 receptions, 65 yards, 1 TD |

=== at Maryland ===
Illinois Fighting Illini (4–3) at Maryland Terrapins (2–5) – Game summary

| Quarter | 1 | 2 | 3 | 4 | Total |
|---|---|---|---|---|---|
| Fighting Illini | 0 | 7 | 3 | 10 | 20 |
| Terrapins | 7 | 0 | 7 | 3 | 17 |

at SECU Stadium • College Park, Maryland

- Date: October 31
- Game weather: 59deg F, wind N 5mph, sunny
- Game attendance: 27,207
- Referee: Tim ODey
- TV announcers (FS1): Noah Reed (play-by-play) and Mark Helfrich (analyst)

| Statistics | ILL | MD |
|---|---|---|
| First downs | 8 | 6 |
| Plays–yards | 407 | 288 |
| Rushes–yards | 184 | 98 |
| Passing yards | 223 | 190 |
| Passing: comp–att–int | 18/32 1 INT | 19/29 1 INT |
| Turnovers | 1 | 2 |
| Time of possession | 29:46 | 30:14 |

| Team | Category | Player | Statistics |
|---|---|---|---|
| Illinois | Passing | Katin Houser | 18/32, 223 yards, 1 TD, 1 INT |
| Illinois | Rushing | Javari Barnett | 6 carries, 80 yards, 1 TD |
| Illinois | Receiving | Collin Dixon | 6 receptions, 103 yards |
| Maryland | Passing | Malik Washington | 19/29, 190 yards, 1 INT |
| Maryland | Rushing | DeJuan Williams | 19 carries, 57 yards, 1 TD |
| Maryland | Receiving | Chris Durr Jr. | 6 receptions, 58 yards |

=== vs Nebraska ===
Nebraska Cornhuskers (5–3) at Illinois Fighting Illini (5–3) – Game summary

| Quarter | 1 | 2 | 3 | 4 | Total |
|---|---|---|---|---|---|
| Cornhuskers | 0 | 7 | 0 | 6 | 13 |
| Fighting Illini | 0 | 7 | 7 | 10 | 24 |

at Gies Memorial Stadium • Champaign, Illinois

- Date: November 6
- Game time: 7:05 p.m. CST
- Game weather: 37deg F, wind NW 6 mph, clear
- Game attendance: 58,587
- Referee: Kole Knueppel
- TV announcers (FOX): Jack Kizer (play-by-play) and Mark Helfrich (analyst)

| Statistics | NEB | ILL |
|---|---|---|
| First downs | 25 | 19 |
| Plays–yards | 426 | 376 |
| Rushes–yards | 142 | 84 |
| Passing yards | 284 | 292 |
| Passing: comp–att–int | 32/43 0 INT | 22/36 0 INT |
| Turnovers | 0 | 0 |
| Time of possession | 31:57 | 28:03 |

| Team | Category | Player | Statistics |
|---|---|---|---|
| Nebraska | Passing | Anthony Colandrea | 32/43, 284 yards, 1 TD |
| Nebraska | Rushing | Jamal Rule | 15 carries,69 yards |
| Nebraska | Receiving | Jacory Barney Jr. | 6 receptions, 93 yards, 1 TD |
| Illinois | Passing | Katin Houser | 22/36, 292 yards, 3 TD |
| Illinois | Rushing | Aidan Laughery | 11 carries, 55 yards |
| Illinois | Receiving | Collin Dixon | 8 receptions, 129 yards, 2 TD |

=== at No. 4 UCLA ===
Illinois Fighting Illini (6–3) at No. 4 UCLA Bruins (9–0) – Game summary

| Quarter | 1 | 2 | 3 | 4 | Total |
|---|---|---|---|---|---|
| Fighting Illini | 0 | 0 | 7 | 7 | 14 |
| No. 4 Bruins | 7 | 3 | 2 | 10 | 22 |

at Rose Bowl • Pasadena, California

- Date: November 13
- Game time: 8:00 p.m. CST
- Game weather: Cloudy • Temperature: 58 °F (14 °C) • Wind: SE at 4 miles per hour (6.4 km/h)
- Game attendance: 45,800
- Referee: Chris Coyte
- TV announcers (FOX): Tim Brando (play-by-play), Devin Gardner (analyst), and Josh Sims (sideline)

| Statistics | ILL | UCLA |
|---|---|---|
| First downs | 17 | 17 |
| Plays–yards | 67–240 | 61–361 |
| Rushes–yards | 30–64 | 34–108 |
| Passing yards | 176 | 253 |
| Passing: comp–att–int | 16–37–3 | 16–27–1 |
| Time of possession | 30:19 | 29:41 |

| Team | Category | Player | Statistics |
|---|---|---|---|
| Illinois | Passing | Katin Houser | 16/34, 176 yards, 2 TD, 3 INT |
| Illinois | Rushing | Aidan Laughery | 16 carries, 49 yards |
| Illinois | Receiving | Hudson Clement | 3 receptions, 62 yards |
| UCLA | Passing | Ty Dieffenbach | 13/20, 232 yards, 2 TD, 1 INT |
| UCLA | Rushing | Wayne Knight | 18 carries, 61 yards |
| UCLA | Receiving | Aidan Mizell | 6 receptions, 176 yards, 1 TD |

=== vs No. 15 Iowa ===
No. 15 Iowa Hawkeyes (8–2) at Illinois Fighting Illini (6–4) – Game summary

| Quarter | 1 | 2 | 3 | 4 | Total |
|---|---|---|---|---|---|
| No. 15 Hawkeyes | 3 | 14 | 3 | 14 | 34 |
| Fighting Illini | 3 | 14 | 0 | 0 | 17 |

at Gies Memorial Stadium • Champaign, Illinois

- Date: November 21
- TV announcers (BTN): Jeff Levering, Jake Butt, and Brooke Fletcher

| Statistics | IOWA | ILL |
|---|---|---|
| First downs | 25 | 16 |
| Plays–yards | 78–401 | 56–346 |
| Rushes–yards | 52–263 | 17–28 |
| Passing yards | 138 | 318 |
| Passing: comp–att–int | 13–26–0 | 21–39–2 |
| Turnovers | 1 | 2 |
| Time of possession | 37:16 | 22:44 |

| Team | Category | Player | Statistics |
|---|---|---|---|
| Iowa | Passing | Hank Brown | 13/26, 138 yards, |
| Iowa | Rushing | L. J. Phillips Jr. | 26 carries, 154 yards, 1 TD |
| Iowa | Receiving | Tony Diaz | 4 receptions, 52 yardsd |
| Illinois | Passing | Katin Houser | 21/39, 318 yards, 2 TD, 2 INT |
| Illinois | Rushing | Aiden Laughery | 10 carries, 27 yards |
| Illinois | Receiving | Collin Dixon | 8 receptions, 142 yards |

=== at Northwestern ===
Illinois Fighting Illini (0–0) at Northwestern Wildcats (0–0) – Game summary

| Quarter | 1 | 2 | Total |
|---|---|---|---|
| Fighting Illini | | | 0 |
| Wildcats | | | 0 |

at Ryan Field • Evanston, Illinois

- Date: November 28

| Statistics | ILL | NU |
|---|---|---|
| First downs | | |
| Plays–yards | | |
| Rushes–yards | | |
| Passing yards | | |
| Passing: comp–att–int | | |
| Time of possession | | |

| Team | Category | Player | Statistics |
|---|---|---|---|
| Illinois | Passing | | |
| Illinois | Rushing | | |
| Illinois | Receiving | | |
| Northwestern | Passing | | |
| Northwestern | Rushing | | |
| Northwestern | Receiving | | |

== Roster ==
2026 Illinois Fighting Illini football team roster
Players
Coaches
Offense

| Pos. | # | Name | Class |
|---|---|---|---|
| WR | 0 | Kenyon Alston | Fr |
| WR | 1 | Jayshon Platt | Sr |
| QB | 2 | Carson Boyd | Fr |
| TE | 3 | Kaden Feagin | Sr |
| QB | 4 | Katin Houser | Sr |
| RB | 5 | Ca'lil Valentine | Jr |
| QB | 7 | Michael Clayton II | Fr |
| WR | 7 | Nas Rankin | Fr |
| WR | 8 | Davon Grant | Fr |
| WR | 9 | Alex Perry | Sr |
| WR | 10 | Ty Robinson | Sr |
| WR | 11 | Brayden Trimble | Fr |
| WR | 13 | Hudson Clement | Sr |
| TE | 14 | Maurice Smith Jr. | Sr |
| QB | 15 | Jershaun Newton | Fr |
| TE | 16 | Logan Farrell | Fr |
| WR | 17 | Collin Dixon | Jr |
| RB | 20 | John Forster | Fr |
| RB | 21 | Aidan Laughery | Sr |
| RB | 22 | Cedric Wyche II | Fr |
| RB | 23 | Jordan Anderson | Sr |
| RB | 24 | Javari Barnett | Fr |
| RB | 25 | Nelsyn Wheeler | Fr |
| RB | 27 | Corey Rashad | Jr |
| WR | 28 | Karson Kaiser | So |
| RB | 31 | Murphy Clement | So |
| OL | 51 | Alfred Washington | Jr |
| OL | 52 | Champ Smith | Fr |
| OL | 53 | Kai Pritchard | Fr |
| OL | 54 | Griffin Rousseau | Fr |
| OL | 55 | T. J. McMillen | Jr |
| OL | 56 | J. J. Hirdes | Fr |
| OL | 57 | Zach Barrett | So |
| OL | 58 | Landen von Seggern | Fr |
| OL | 59 | Jake Renfro | Sr |
| OL | 62 | Casey Thomann | Fr |
| OL | 66 | Brandon Hansen | Jr |
| OL | 68 | Michael McDonough | Fr |
| OL | 70 | Maika Matelau | So |
| OL | 71 | Nathan Knapik | So |
| OL | 72 | Christian Martin | Jr |
| OL | 74 | Zafir Stewart | So |
| OL | 75 | Brandon Henderson | Sr |
| OL | 76 | Dylan Frechette | Fr |
| OL | 78 | Eddie Tuerk | So |
| OL | 79 | TJ Taylor | Jr |
| WR | 81 | Leslie Mosley Jr. | Fr |
| WR | 82 | Jacob Harvey | Fr |
| WR | 83 | Eddie Kasper | Sr |
| TE | 84 | Grant Smith | Fr |
| TE | 85 | Will Vala III | Fr |
| TE | 86 | Christian Abney | Sr |
| TE | 88 | Davin Stoffel | Jr |
| TE | 89 | Tanner Hollinger | So |

Defense

| Pos. | # | Name | Class |
|---|---|---|---|
| DB | 0 | Mac Resetich | Sr |
| DB | 1 | Xavier Scott | Sr |
| DB | 2 | R. J. Jones III | Fr |
| DB | 3 | Nick Hankins Jr. | Fr |
| LB | 4 | Daniel Brown | Sr |
| DB | 5 | Jakwon Morris | Jr |
| DB | 6 | Jaheim Clarke | Sr |
| DB | 7 | Matthew Bailey | Sr |
| LB | 8 | Cameron Thomas | Fr |
| DB | 9 | Lavon Williams | Sr |
| LB | 10 | James Kreutz | Sr |
| LB | 11 | Jacob Alexander | Fr |
| DB | 12 | Isaiah Williams | Fr |
| DB | 13 | Xanai Scott | Fr |
| DB | 14 | Andre Lovett Jr. | So |
| DL | 15 | Kingston Shaw | Fr |
| DB | 16 | Tanner Heckel | Jr |
| DL | 17 | Isaiah Thomison | Jr |
| LB | 18 | Mason Muragin | Jr |
| DB | 19 | Jacob Eberhart | Fr |
| DB | 20 | Almirian Thomas | Fr |
| DB | 21 | Ben Clawson | Sr |
| DB | 22 | Deuce Fillmore | Sr |
| LB | 23 | Jaylen Stewart | Fr |
| LB | 24 | Will Holmes | Jr |
| DB | 25 | Des Straughton | Fr |
| LB | 26 | Ismael Kante | Sr |
| LB | 28 | Kayden Bennett | Fr |
| LB | 30 | Tony Williams | Fr |
| DB | 32 | Tywan Cox | Fr |
| LB | 33 | Grant Beerman | So |
| LB | 34 | Erik Gayle | Fr |
| DB | 35 | Kaedyn Cobbs | Fr |
| DB | 37 | Caden Considine | Fr |
| LB | 38 | Jack Paris | Fr |
| DL | 43 | Joe Barna | Jr |
| LB | 45 | Robert Edmonson | Jr |
| LB | 48 | Carter Smith | So |
| DL | 51 | Parker Crim | Fr |
| DL | 52 | Pat Farrell | Jr |
| DL | 54 | Demetrius John | So |
| DL | 55 | Tony Balanganayi | Fr |
| DL | 56 | Guillermo Gallardo | Sr |
| DL | 90 | Carter Janki | Sr |
| DL | 91 | Cameron Brooks | Fr |
| DL | 94 | Connor Sullivan | Fr |
| DL | 95 | Isaiah White | Fr |
| DL | 96 | Darrell Prater | Sr |
| DL | 99 | King Liggins | Fr |
| DB | | James Finley | So |

Special teams

| Pos. | # | Name | Class |
|---|---|---|---|
| P | 18 | Jack Gray | Fr |
| K | 27 | Lucas Osada | So |
| K | 37 | Ethan Moczulski | Sr |
| LS | 44 | Patrick Mahoney III | Jr |
| LS | 49 | Zach Haber | Jr |
| P | 81 | Lars Rau | So |

Head coach

- Bret Bielema

Coordinators/assistant coaches

- Barry Lunney Jr. – Offensive coordinator/quarterbacks
- Bobby Hauck – Defensive coordinator
- Chris Hurd – Special teams coordinator
- Ronnie Bradford – Secondary
- Roger Cooper – Inside linebackers
- Jared Elliott – Tight ends
- Mike Linehan – Defensive ends
- Archie McDaniel – Outside linebackers
- Bart Miller – Offensive line
- Mike Neu – Pass game coordinator
- Corey Parker – Defensive backs
- Artur Sitkowski – Quarterbacks
- Justin Stepp – Wide receivers
- Jordan Thomas – Defensive line/run game coordinator
- Tyrone Wheatley – Running backs
- Ben Miller – Senior head coach analyst
- Danny Cameron – Senior offensive analyst/Assistant running backs
- Myers Hendrickson – Senior defensive analyst
- Byron Bell – Assistant offensive line
- Harper Cole – Assistant wide receivers
- Matt Ellerbrock – Assistant linebackers
- Robby Hauck – Assistant defensive backs
- Steven Koch – Assistant special teams
- Alex Panos – Assistant defensive line
- Ryan Simerson – Assistant secondary
- Blake Smithback – Offensive front assistant
- Tank Wright – Director, Strength and Conditioning
- G. C. Yerry – Associate Director, Strength and Conditioning
- Nick Elicone – Assistant, Strength and Conditioning
- Jason Jones – Assistant, Strength and Conditioning
- CJ McFarland – Assistant, Strength and Conditioning

Legend

- (C) Team captain
- (S) Suspended
- (I) Ineligible
- Injured
- Redshirt

Roster
Last update: 5/5/2026
