= Ty Dieffenbach =

American football player (born 2005)

No. 14 – UCLA Bruins
- Position: Quarterback
- Class: Senior

Personal information
- Born: June 8, 2005 (age 21)
- Listed height: 6 ft 6 in (1.98 m)
- Listed weight: 227 lb (103 kg)

Career information
- High school: Agoura (Agoura Hills, California)
- College: Pittsburgh (2023–2024); Cal Poly (2025); UCLA (2026–present)
- Stats at ESPN

Ty Dieffenbach (born June 8, 2005) is an American college football quarterback for the UCLA Bruins. He previously played for the Pittsburgh Panthers and Cal Poly Mustangs.

== Early life ==
Dieffenbach attended Agoura High School in Agoura Hills, California. After beginning his career as a wide receiver, he moved to quarterback as a sophomore. Despite never playing the position before, he had impressed head coach Dustin Croick with his passing in practice, and the team needed a quarterback. As a junior, Dieffenbach threw for 2,669 yards and a school-record 34 touchdowns. He committed to the University of Pittsburgh to play college football.

== College career ==
Dieffenbach spent two seasons with the Pittsburgh Panthers but did not appear in a game. Following the conclusion of the 2024 season, he entered the transfer portal. Pittsburgh had encouraged him to switch to tight end, but Dieffenbach preferred to remain a quarterback.

Dieffenbach transferred to California Polytechnic State University, San Luis Obispo, to play for the Cal Poly Mustangs. In his collegiate debut and first career start, in the 2025 season opener against San Diego, he completed 18 passes for 263 yards and two touchdowns while adding a rushing touchdown. Dieffenbach's performance earned him Big Sky Offensive Player of the Week honors. He appeared in 11 games, making nine starts, and recorded 1,305 passing yards, nine touchdowns, and nine interceptions while rushing for 321 yards and four touchdowns. Dieffenbach entered the transfer portal for the second time following the end of the season.

Dieffenbach announced in January 2026 that he would transfer to the University of California, Los Angeles, to play for the UCLA Bruins. He entered the season as the third-string quarterback behind brothers Nico and Madden Iamaleava. After Nico Iamaleava was injured against No. 13 Oregon, Dieffenbach took over at quarterback, throwing for 43 yards and a touchdown to lead the Bruins to a 17–15 upset victory. With Iamaleava out indefinitely, UCLA head coach Bob Chesney named Dieffenbach the starter for the following game against Wisconsin. In his first start for the Bruins, he completed 22 of 33 passes for 264 yards in a 17–7 win over the Badgers. He threw for a career-high 303 yards on only eight completions for three touchdowns, including two 75-yard scores in the fourth quarter to Aidan Mizell, in a 34–20 win over Minnesota. He averaged 37.9 yards per completion, and was named the Big Ten Conference Offensive Player of the Week.

=== Statistics ===
Season	Team	Games			Passing								Rushing			
Season	Team	GP	GS	Record	Cmp	Att	Pct	Yds	Avg	TD	Int	Rtg	Att	Yds	Avg	TD
2023	Pittsburgh	Did not play														
2024	Pittsburgh	Did not play														
2025	Cal Poly	11	9	2–7	92	162	56.8	1,305	8.1	9	9	131.7	67	321	4.8	4
2026	UCLA	5	4	4–0	67	116	57.8	986	8.5	6	2	142.9	25	25	1.0	1
Career		16	13	6–7	159	278	57.2	2,291	8.2	15	11	136.3	92	346	3.8	5
