= Tashawn =

Tashawn is a given name. Notable people with the name include:

- Tashawn Bower (born 1995), American football player
- Ta'Shawn James, American football player
- Tashawn Manning (born 1998), American football player
- TaShawn Thomas (born 1993), American basketball player

== See also ==
- Tashaun Gipson (born 1990), American football player
