= Sammy Omosigho =

American football linebacker (born 2004)

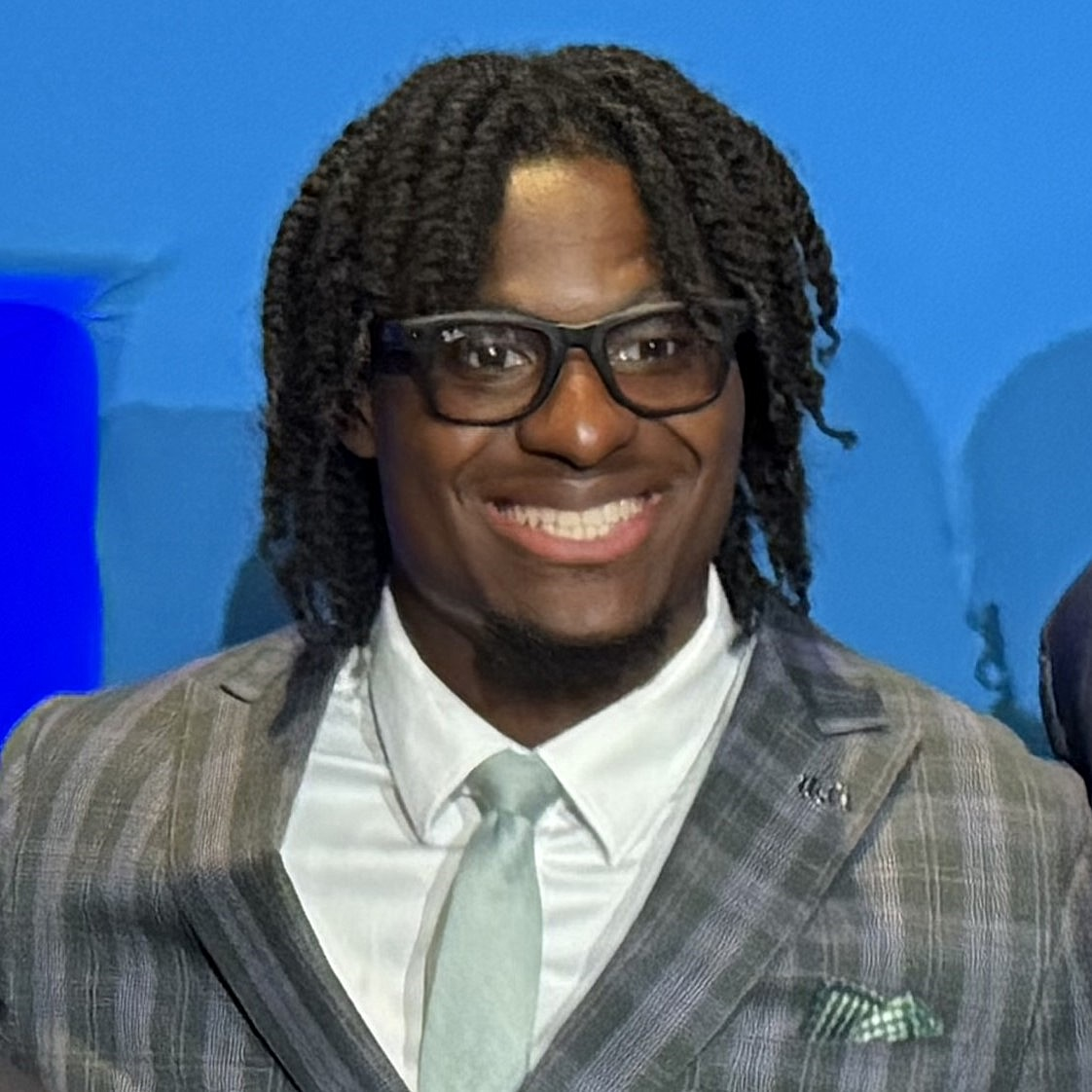
- Omosigho at 2026 Big Ten Media Day

No. 10 – UCLA Bruins
- Position: Linebacker
- Class: Senior

Personal information
- Born: September 17, 2004 (age 22)
- Listed height: 6 ft 2 in (1.88 m)
- Listed weight: 239 lb (108 kg)

Career information
- High school: Crandall (Crandall, Texas)
- College: Oklahoma (2023–2025); UCLA (2026–present)
- Stats at ESPN

Samuel Omosigho (born September 17, 2004) is an American football linebacker for the UCLA Bruins. He previously played for the Oklahoma Sooners.

== Early life ==
Omosigho attended Crandall High School in Crandall, Texas. Coming out of high school, he was rated as a four-star recruit, where he held offers from Florida, TCU, and Oklahoma. Ultimately, Omosigho committed to play college football for the Oklahoma Sooners.

== College career ==
In his first collegiate season at the University of Oklahoma in 2023, Omosigho played in 10 games, notching seven tackles with half a tackle for a loss. During the 2024 season, Omosigho played all 13 games, recording 39 tackles with five being for a loss, six pressures, a pass deflection, and a forced fumble.

Heading into the 2025 season, he was named to the Butkus Award watch list and earned a starting spot at linebacker for the Sooners. In week one of the 2025 season, Omosigho totaled eight tackles and his first career sack in a season opening win over Illinois State. In week 12, he recorded six tackles and a fumble recovery in an upset win over Alabama.

In 2026, Omosigho transferred to the University of California, Los Angeles, to play for the Bruins. He was a first-team midseason All-American selection by the Associated Press and was named a semifinalist for the Butkus Award.
