= Dean Kennedy (American football) =

American football coach

Current position
- Title: Offensive coordinator & quarterbacks coach
- Team: UCLA
- Conference: Big Ten

Playing career

Football
- 2010–2013: Rochester

Basketball
- 2011–2013: Rochester
- Positions: Quarterback (football); Guard/forward (basketball)

Coaching career (HC unless noted)
- 2015: ASA Brooklyn (QB)
- 2016: ASA Brooklyn (OC)
- 2017: Mississippi State (GA)
- 2018–2020: Florida (GA)
- 2020: Florida (OQC)
- 2020–2021: Florida (Assistant QB)
- 2022: Holy Cross (QB)
- 2023: Holy Cross (OC/QB)
- 2024–2025: James Madison (OC/QB)
- 2026–present: UCLA (OC/QB)

Dean Kennedy is an American college football coach. He is the offensive coordinator and quarterbacks coach for the UCLA Bruins football team.

== Playing career ==
Kennedy grew up in Scituate, Massachusetts and attended Scituate High School before completing a postgraduate year at the Canterbury School in New Milford, Connecticut. He played football, basketball, and lacrosse at both schools.

Kennedy attended the University of Rochester and played both basketball and football for the Rochester Yellowjackets. As a junior, he passed for a school-record 2,028 yards with 15 touchdowns and nine interceptions. Kennedy was named first-team All-Liberty League as a senior after completing 171 of 302 pass attempts for 1,921 yards and 13 touchdowns with 11 interceptions and also rushing for 645 yards and six touchdowns on 115 carries.

== Coaching career ==
Kennedy began his coaching career at ASA College before being hired as a graduate assistant at Mississippi State under head coach Dan Mullen. After one season he followed Mullen after he was hired as the head coach at Florida and joined the staff as a graduate assistant. Kennedy was promoted to an offensive quality control assistant in 2020 and was promoted a second time during the season to assistant quarterbacks coach.

Kennedy was hired as the quarterbacks coach at Holy Cross for the 2022 season. He was promoted to offensive coordinator after one season. Holy Cross averaged a Patriot League-high 36.9 points per game in 2023.

Kennedy was hired as the offensive coordinator at James Madison after the 2023 season after Holy Cross head coach Bob Chesney was hired.
