= Anthony Woods (American football) =

American football player

No. 6 – UCLA Bruins
- Position: Running back
- Class: Fifth Year

Personal information
- Born: Palmdale, California, U.S.
- Listed height: 5 ft 11 in (1.80 m)
- Listed weight: 192 lb (87 kg)

Career information
- High school: Palmdale
- College: Idaho (2022–2023); Utah (2024); UCLA (2025–present)

Awards and highlights
- First-team All-Big Sky (2023); Second-team All-Big Sky (2022)
- Stats at ESPN

Anthony Woods is an American college football running back for the UCLA Bruins. He previously played for the Idaho Vandals and Utah Utes.

== Early life ==
Woods attended Palmdale High School in Palmdale, California. As a senior, Woods rushed for more than 1,500 yards and 24 touchdowns, before committing to play college football at the University of Idaho.

== College career ==
=== Idaho ===
Woods received significant playing time as a freshman in 2022, rushing for 872 yards and three touchdowns for the Vandals. As a result, he earned freshman All-American honors. The following season against Eastern Washington, he ran for a career-high 211 yards and five touchdowns. At the end of the 2023 regular season, Woods was named to the first-team all-Big Sky. He finished the season rushing for 1,155 yards and 16 touchdowns before entering the transfer portal.

=== Utah ===
On December 19, 2023, Woods announced that he would be transferring to the University of Utah to play for the Utah Utes.

On December 6, 2024, Woods announced that he would enter the transfer portal for the second time.

=== UCLA ===
On January 9, 2025, Woods announced that he would transfer to the University of California, Los Angeles. In the 2026 season opener, he carried eight times for 118 yards and two touchdowns in a 45–24 win over California.

=== Statistics ===
College statistics
Year	Team	Games	Rushing				Receiving			
Year	Team	GP	Att	Yards	Avg	TD	Rec	Yards	Avg	TD
2022	Idaho	12	154	871	5.7	3	5	9	1.8	0
2023	Idaho	12	207	1,155	5.5	16	15	92	6.1	1
2024	Utah	DNP								
2025	UCLA	11	63	294	4.7	0	24	211	8.8	2
2026	UCLA	9	86	524	6.1	6	9	49	5.4	0
Career		44	510	2,821	5.5	25	53	361	6.8	3
