= Ta'Shawn James =

American football player

No. 27 – UCLA Bruins
- Position: Safety
- Class: Redshirt Junior

Personal information
- Listed height: 6 ft 0 in (1.83 m)
- Listed weight: 211 lb (96 kg)

Career information
- High school: Carl Albert (Midwest City, Oklahoma)
- College: Iowa State (2023–2025); UCLA (2026–present)
- Stats at ESPN

Ta'Shawn James is an American college football safety for the UCLA Bruins. He previously played for the Iowa State Cyclones.

== Early life ==
James was inspired to start playing football by watching his older cousin, Tre' Porter, a local prep star who went on to play college football at Texas Tech. After convincing his mother, he was allowed to start playing the sport at age seven. James, who was often taller than his peers growing up, played the defensive end position in middle school.

James attended Carl Albert High School in Midwest City, Oklahoma, a suburb of Oklahoma City, where he helped the football team win three state championships in 2019, 2020, and 2022. In the 2022 title game, he caught a 35-yard touchdown pass and grabbed an interception in a 49–7 win over McAlester High School. As a senior, James recorded 74 tackles, including nine for a loss, four interceptions, a fumble recovery and a pass breakup. He also tallied 31 receptions for 535 yards and five touchdowns on offense and averaged 31.4 yards per kick return. James was named to The Oklahoman Super 30 as one of the top 30 recruits in the state. He also competed in basketball and track and field at Carl Albert.

James was rated as a consensus three-star recruit. He was ranked by ESPN as the 16th-best prospect in Oklahoma and the 90th-best safety nationally in the class of 2023. On June 24, 2022, James verbally committed to playing college football at Iowa State University over offers from Northern Iowa and Tulsa. He signed with the Cyclones during the early signing period in December 2022.

== College career ==
As a freshman in 2023, James appeared in four games and recorded five tackles, taking a redshirt. He played in all 14 games in 2024, making two starts, and registered 41 tackles, one forced fumble, and one fumble recovery. James posted eight tackles and a fumble recovery in a 42–41 win over AP No. 13 Miami in the 2024 Pop-Tarts Bowl. The victory gave the Cyclones an 11–3 record, the best in program history. In 2025, James played in the first eight games, making six starts, before suffering a season-ending injury. He finished the year with 33 tackles and one fumble recovery. James entered the NCAA transfer portal after the season and was rated as a three-star transfer recruit by both On3 and 247Sports. On January 5, 2026, he committed to transferring to the University of California, Los Angeles (UCLA) to play for the Bruins.

James joined the Bruins for spring camp ahead of the 2026 season. He mostly did not play with the starters during training camp. In their season opener, he replaced starting free safety Tao Johnson, who left injured. James recorded two interceptions (the first of his career) and eight tackles in a 45–24 win over California. James, who picked off Jaron-Keawe Sagapolutele twice in the fourth quarter, was named the Big Ten Conference co-Defensive Player of the Week and the Thorpe Award National Defensive Back of the Week. On September 26, he grabbed an interception and returned it 39 yards for a touchdown in a 54–3 blowout victory over Maryland. Following a bye week, James logged another interception in a 17–15 upset win over No. 13 Oregon on October 10, picking off Ducks quarterback Dylan Raiola. He was named a first-team midseason All-American by the Associated Press.

== Personal life ==
James was a multiple-time selection to the Big 12 Conference Commissioner's Honor Roll during his time at Iowa State.
