= Scooter Jackson =

American football player

No. 1 – UCLA Bruins
- Position: Cornerback
- Class: Senior

Personal information
- Listed height: 5 ft 11 in (1.80 m)
- Listed weight: 191 lb (87 kg)

Career information
- High school: Warren (Downey, California)
- College: Utah Tech (2023–2024); UCLA (2025–present)
- Stats at ESPN

Huron "Scooter" Jackson III is an American college football cornerback for the UCLA Bruins. He previously played for the Utah Tech Trailblazers.

== Early life ==
Jackson attended Warren High School in Downey, California. He was rated as a three-star recruit by 247Sports and committed to play college football for the Utah Tech Trailblazers.

== College career ==
In two years at Utah Tech from 2023 to 2024, Jackson started 16 games totaling 55 tackles, nine pass deflections, and an interception. After the 2024 season, he entered the NCAA transfer portal.

Jackson transferred to play for the UCLA Bruins. During the 2025 season, he notched 44 tackles, two interceptions, and a forced fumble. In week 10 of the 2026 season, Jackson recorded an interception in a win over Minnesota. A week later he recorded two interceptions against Illinois.
