= Wayne Knight (American football) =

American football player

- Knight with UCLA in 2026

No. 3 – UCLA Bruins
- Position: Running back
- Class: Redshirt Senior

Personal information
- Listed height: 5 ft 7 in (1.70 m)
- Listed weight: 193 lb (88 kg)

Career information
- High school: Smyrna (Smyrna, Delaware)
- College: James Madison (2022–2025); UCLA (2026–present)

Awards and highlights
- Second-team All-American (2025); First-team All-Sun Belt (2025)
- Stats at ESPN

Wayne Knight is an American college football running back for the UCLA Bruins. He previously played for the James Madison Dukes, earning second-team All-American honors in 2025.

== Early life ==
Knight grew up in Smyrna, Delaware. Growing up in a football family, his older brothers, Will and Wade Jr., were both standout athletes in the sport, a driving reason for Knight to begin playing at a young age. He attended Smyrna High School in Smyrna, Delaware. At Smyrna, Knight was both a three-time all-state and all-conference selection, and helped his team reach a Delaware Class 3A championship game his senior year. He committed to James Madison University (JMU) to play college football.

== College career ==
Knight played in eight games and had five carries for negative eight yards his true freshman year at JMU. He redshirted in 2023 after rushing for 23 yards over four carries in four games. In 2024, he played in 13 games with two starts and had 77 carries for 449 yards with two touchdowns and added 15 receptions for 137 yards with two touchdowns. Knight entered 2025 as the starting running back. He was named the MVP of the 2025 Sun Belt Conference Football Championship Game after rushing for 211 yards and a game record 234 all-purpose yards. He finished the year with 1,373 yards on 207 carries with nine touchdowns and 40 receptions for 397 yards with one touchdown. He set a James Madison single-season record with 2,039 all-purpose yards. He was named a second-team All-American as an all-purpose player by the Associated Press.

On December 27, 2025, Knight announced that he would enter the transfer portal. On January 7, 2026, he transferred to the University of California, Los Angeles. He was one of 10 former Dukes to join their former head coach Bob Chesney in his move to the Bruins. In their 2026 season opener, Knight ran for three touchdowns and 71 yards on eight carries in a 45–24 win over California. The following week in their home opener, Knight scored three touchdowns again in a 28–10 win over San Diego State. In UCLA's Big Ten opener, he ran for 177 yards and two touchdowns in 52–38 win over Purdue. His eight touchdowns in three games matched the Bruins' rushing touchdown total from their previous season. For the second consecutive season, he was named a finalist for the Paul Hornung Award, which honors the most versatile player in the Football Bowl Subdivision.

=== College statistics ===
Year	Team	Games		Rushing				Receiving				Kick returns		
Year	Team	GP	GS	Att	Yards	Avg	TD	Rec	Yards	Avg	TD	Att	Yards	TD
2022	James Madison	8	0	5	-8	-1.6	0	5	63	12.6	0	4	87	0
2023	James Madison	4	0	4	23	5.8	0	1	11	11.0	0	0	0	0
2024	James Madison	13	2	77	449	5.8	2	15	137	9.1	2	0	0	0
2025	James Madison	14	14	207	1,373	6.6	9	40	397	9.9	1	4	89	0
Career		39	16	293	1,837	6.3	11	61	608	10.0	3	8	176	0

== Personal life ==
Knight grew up a fan of the Philadelphia Eagles and wide receiver DeSean Jackson.
