= Nico Iamaleava =

American football player (born 2004)

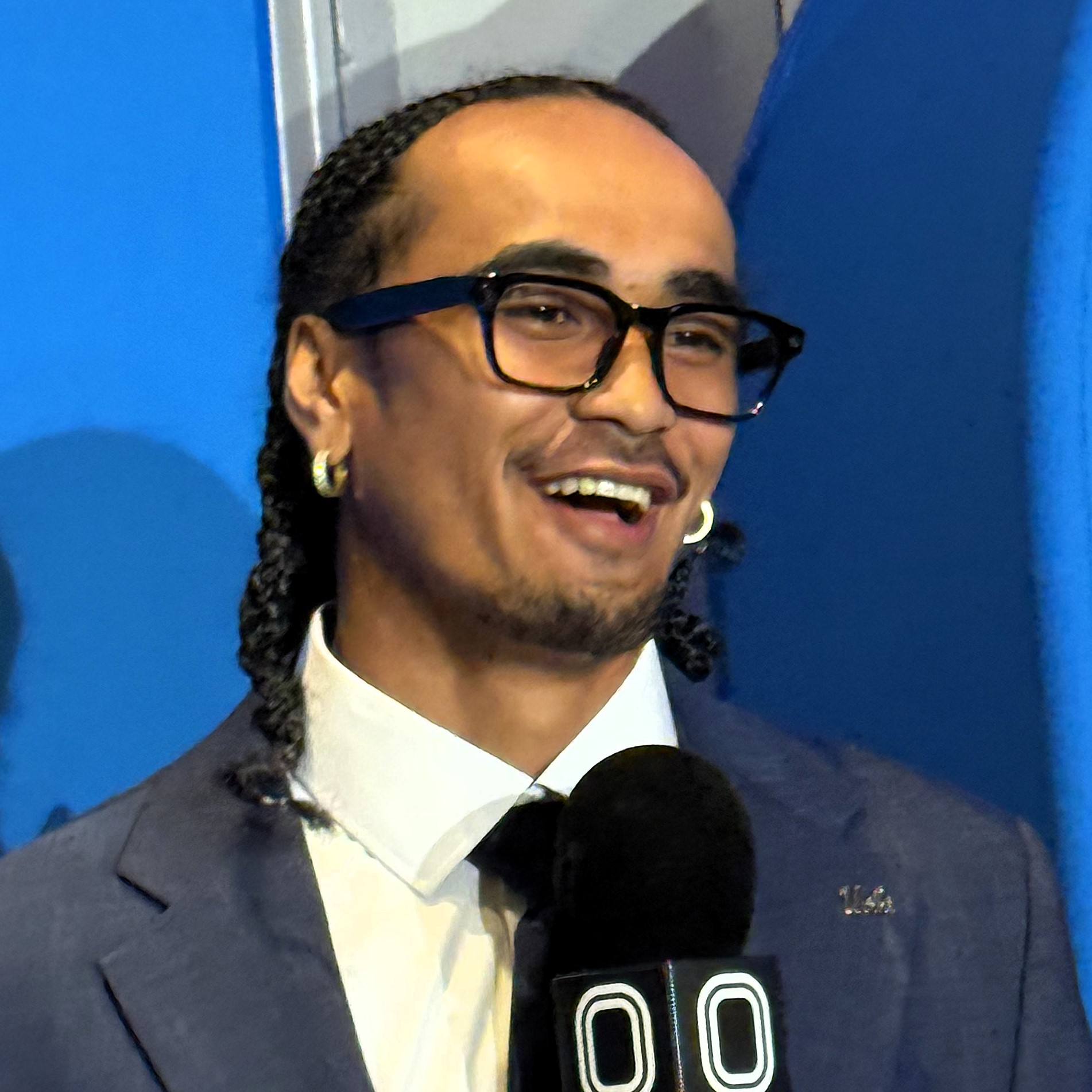
- Iamaleava at 2026 Big Ten Media Day

No. 9 – UCLA Bruins
- Position: Quarterback
- Class: Senior

Personal information
- Born: September 2, 2004 (age 22)
- Listed height: 6 ft 5 in (1.96 m)
- Listed weight: 215 lb (98 kg)

Career information
- High school: Warren (Downey, California)
- College: Tennessee (2023–2024); UCLA (2025–present)
- Stats at ESPN

Nicholaus "Nico" Iamaleava (/iˌjɑːməleɪˈjɑːvə/ ee-YAH-mə-lay-YAH-və; born September 2, 2004) is an American college football quarterback for the UCLA Bruins. He previously played for the Tennessee Volunteers.

== Early life ==
Iamaleava was born on September 2, 2004, and is of Samoan descent. Iamaleava attended both Warren High School in Downey, California and Long Beach Polytechnic High School. As a senior, Iamaleava threw for 1,726 yards and 25 touchdowns, while also rushing for six touchdowns. He was named the Polynesian High School Football Player of the Year. Iamaleava was also named the MVP of the Polynesian Bowl, throwing for 186 yards and a touchdown. Iamaleava was rated as one of the top players in the class of 2023 and committed to play college football at the University of Tennessee.

Iamaleava enrolled early at Tennessee in December 2022, participating in workouts for the 2022 Orange Bowl.

College recruiting (2023)
Name	Hometown	School	Height	Weight	Commit date
Nico Iamaleava; QB	Long Beach, California	Warren	6 ft 5 in (1.96 m)	195 lb (88 kg)	Mar 21, 2022
Nico Iamaleava; QB	Recruit ratings: Rivals: 247Sports: ESPN: (87)				

== College career ==
=== Tennessee ===
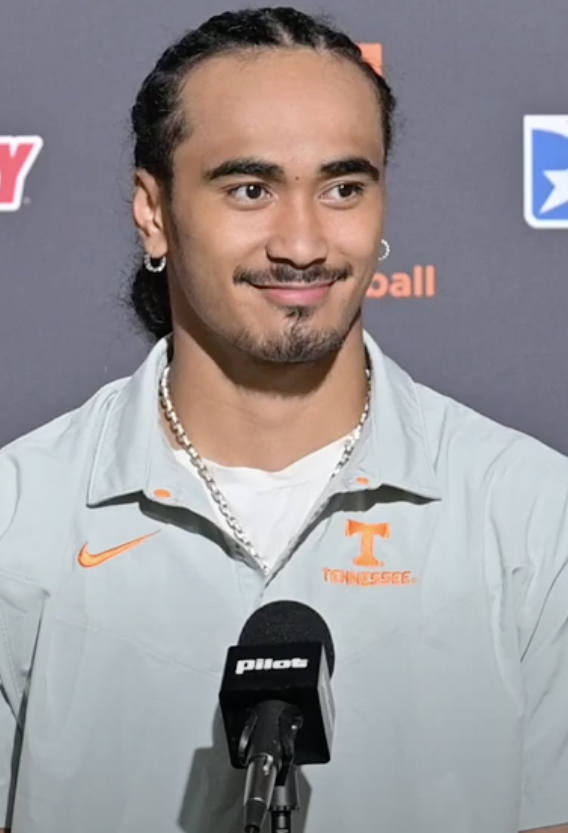
Iamaleava at Tennessee in 2024.

Iamaleava served as the backup quarterback to Joe Milton during the 2023 regular season before being named Tennessee's starting quarterback for the Citrus Bowl, played in January. In his first career start during the Citrus Bowl, Iamaleava threw for 151 yards and recorded four total touchdowns, one passing and three rushing, leading Tennessee to a 35–0 victory over Iowa. For his performance, he was named Citrus Bowl MVP.

Entering the 2024 season, Iamaleava was named Tennessee's starting quarterback. In the season opener against Chattanooga, he threw for 314 yards and three touchdowns in a 69–3 win. Iamaleava finished the season throwing for 2,616 yards, 19 touchdowns, and five interceptions, leading Tennessee to a 10–3 record and the program's first-ever College Football Playoff appearance.

On April 10, 2025, it was reported that Iamaleava was in active contract negotiations with Tennessee regarding a rework of his NIL deal. The next day, Iamaleava was absent from the team's practice prior to the Volunteers’ spring game. On April 12, head football coach Josh Heupel announced that Tennessee would be moving on from Iamaleava at quarterback.

=== UCLA ===
Iamaleava with UCLA in 2026

On April 20, 2025, Iamaleava announced his decision to transfer to the University of California, Los Angeles to play for the UCLA Bruins. In his UCLA debut against Utah, Iamaleava struggled, completing 11 passes for 136 yards, a touchdown, and an interception in a 43–10 loss. Against No. 7 Penn State, Iamaleava led the previously winless Bruins to an upset victory, throwing for 166 yards and accounting for five total touchdowns in the 42–37 win. He continued his success the following week against Michigan State, throwing for 180 yards and three touchdowns in a 38–13 victory. Iamaleava finished the 2025 season with 1,928 passing yards, 13 passing touchdowns, and seven interceptions, while rushing for 505 yards and four touchdowns.

In the Bruins' Big Ten Conference opener in 2026, Iamaleava threw for 276 yards and three touchdowns in a 52–38 win over Purdue. UCLA upset No. 13 Oregon 17–15 to improve to 5–0, but Iamaleava injured his left knee late in the second quarter, which sidelined him in the second half. He needed season-ending surgery.

=== Statistics ===
Year	Team	Games			Passing								Rushing			
Year	Team	GP	GS	Record	Cmp	Att	Pct	Yds	Y/A	TD	Int	Rtg	Att	Yds	Avg	TD
2023	Tennessee	5	1	1–0	28	45	62.2	314	7.0	2	0	135.5	20	71	3.6	3
2024	Tennessee	13	13	10–3	213	334	63.8	2,616	7.8	19	5	145.3	109	358	3.3	3
2025	UCLA	11	11	3–8	208	323	64.4	1,928	6.0	13	7	123.5	112	505	4.5	4
2026	UCLA	5	5	5–0	72	116	62.1	982	8.5	4	4	137.7	42	144	3.4	1
Career		34	30	19−11	521	818	63.7	5,840	7.1	38	16	135.1	283	1,078	3.8	11

== Personal life ==
His brother, Madden Iamaleava, was a four-star QB recruit in the 2025 college football recruiting class who first committed to play for UCLA, but then flipped to Arkansas in December 2024. On April 21, 2025, a day after Nico transferred to UCLA, Madden decided to follow his brother and also transfer to UCLA.
