= Aidan Mizell =

American football player

No. 1 – UCLA Bruins
- Position: Wide receiver
- Class: Redshirt Junior

Personal information
- Listed height: 6 ft 1 in (1.85 m)
- Listed weight: 177 lb (80 kg)

Career information
- High school: Boone (Orlando, Florida)
- College: Florida (2023–2025); UCLA (2026–present)
- Stats at ESPN

Aidan Xavier Mizell is an American football wide receiver for the UCLA Bruins. He previously played for the Florida Gators.

== Early life ==
Mizell attended William R. Boone High School in Orlando, Florida. As a junior, he had 47 receptions for 1,003 yards and 18 touchdowns. Mizell was rated as a four-star recruit by ESPN and 247Sports and committed to play college football for the Florida Gators over offers from Alabama and Tennessee.

== College career ==
As a freshman in 2023, Mizell tallied two catches for 25 yards in two games. In 2024, he recorded 17 receptions for 202 yards and two touchdowns. In 2025, Mizell notched 19 catches for 177 yards and a touchdown. After the season, he entered the NCAA transfer portal.

Mizell transferred to play for the UCLA Bruins. In week 10 of the 2026 season, he had two catches for 150 yards and two touchdowns in a win over Minnesota. In week 11, Mizell caught a 54-yard pass for his third straight touchdown reception, following his two scores from the previous week, and finished with six catches for 176 yards in a win versus Illinois.
