= Madden Iamaleava =

American football player

No. 10 – UCLA Bruins
- Position: Quarterback
- Class: Redshirt Freshman

Personal information
- Listed height: 6 ft 2 in (1.88 m)
- Listed weight: 197 lb (89 kg)

Career information
- High school: Long Beach Polytechnic (Long Beach, California)
- College: UCLA (2025–present)
- Stats at ESPN

Madden Iamaleava is an American football quarterback for the UCLA Bruins.

== Early life ==
Iamaleava initially attended Warren High School in Downey, California. As a sophomore, he completed 31 of 58 passes for 675 yards and 10 touchdowns to go with 62 rushing yards. As a junior, Iamaleava completed 196 of 311 passes for 3,626 yards and 43 touchdowns with four interceptions. Iamaleava was denied eligibility for his senior season due to a midseason transfer to Long Beach Polytechnic High School. He committed to play college football for the UCLA Bruins over Oregon. However, Iamaleava flipped his commitment to play for the Arkansas Razorbacks.

== College career ==
After enrolling at Arkansas and participating in spring practice, Iamaleava entered the NCAA transfer portal before the start of the 2025 season. He transferred to play for the UCLA Bruins. As a freshman in 2025, Iamaleava appeared in one game.

== Personal life ==
Iamaleava is the younger brother of UCLA quarterback Nico Iamaleava.
