= Chris Smith (American football coach) =

American football coach (born c. 1950)

Biographical details
- Born: c. 1950 (age 75–76); Massillon, Ohio, U.S.
- Education: Grove City College (1972); Western Kentucky University

Playing career
- 1968–1971: Grove City
- Position: Safety

Coaching career (HC unless noted)
- 1972–?: Perry HS (OH) (assistant)
- ?–1978: Western Kentucky (OLB)
- 1979–1983: Grove City (assistant)
- 1984–2015: Grove City

Administrative career (AD unless noted)
- 1996–2003: Grove City

Head coaching record
- Overall: 122–185–2

Accomplishments and honors

Championships
- 2 PAC (1997–1998)

Christopher Smith (born c. 1950) is an American former college football coach. He was the head football coach for Grove City College from 1984 to 2015. He also coached for Perry High School and Western Kentucky. He played college football for Grove City as a safety.

== Head coaching record ==
Year	Team	Overall	Conference	Standing	Bowl/playoffs
Grove City Wolverines (Presidents' Athletic Conference) (1984–2015)
1984	Grove City	3–6	2–4	T–4th	
1985	Grove City	4–5	2–4	T–4th	
1986	Grove City	5–4	4–2	T–2nd	
1987	Grove City	3–6	2–4	5th	
1988	Grove City	4–4–1	2–3–1	T–4th	
1989	Grove City	2–6–1	1–3–1	5th	
1990	Grove City	1–8	1–3	T–3rd	
1991	Grove City	3–6	1–3	4th	
1992	Grove City	5–4	3–1	2nd	
1993	Grove City	5–4	2–2	T–2nd	
1994	Grove City	4–5	2–2	T–2nd	
1995	Grove City	2–8	1–3	4th	
1996	Grove City	2–8	1–4	5th	
1997	Grove City	9–1	5–0	1st	
1998	Grove City	5–5	3–1	T–1st	
1999	Grove City	6–4	3–1	2nd	
2000	Grove City	6–4	3–1	2nd	
2001	Grove City	2–8	1–3	T–4th	
2002	Grove City	3–7	1–4	T–5th	
2003	Grove City	5–5	2–3	4th	
2004	Grove City	3–7	1–4	5th	
2005	Grove City	3–7	2–4	T–4th	
2006	Grove City	3–7	1–5	T–6th	
2007	Grove City	4–6	3–3	3rd	
2008	Grove City	6–4	3–3	T–3rd	
2009	Grove City	5–5	4–2	3rd	
2010	Grove City	5–5	3–4	T–5th	
2011	Grove City	3–7	3–5	T–7th	
2012	Grove City	6–4	5–3	4th	
2013	Grove City	5–5	3–5	T–6th	
2014	Grove City	0–10	0–8	11th	
2015	Grove City	0–10	0–8	11th	
Grove City:		122–185–2	70–106–2		
Total:		122–185–2			
National championship Conference title Conference division title or championship game berth
