= Tao Johnson =

American football player

No. 6 – UCLA Bruins
- Position: Safety
- Class: Redshirt Senior

Personal information
- Listed height: 6 ft 0 in (1.83 m)
- Listed weight: 194 lb (88 kg)

Career information
- High school: Thunder Ridge (Idaho Falls, Idaho)
- College: Utah (2022–2025); UCLA (2026–present)
- Stats at ESPN

Tao Johnson is an American college football safety for the UCLA Bruins. He previously played for the Utah Utes.

== Early life ==
Johnson attended Thunder Ridge High School located in Idaho Falls, Idaho. Coming out of high school, he committed to play college football for the Utah Utes over offers from other schools such as Washington State, Virginia, and UNLV.

== College career ==
=== Utah ===
In his freshman season in 2022, Johnson played in fives game as a wide receiver, however heading into the 2023 season, he would switch his position to play for the Utes defense as a defensive back. In week four of the 2023 season, he tallied four tackles and a fumble recovery in a victory over UCLA. During the 2023 season, he played in 13 games making 12 starts, where he recorded 33 tackles with one and a half being for a loss, five pass deflections, and a fumble recovery. In week two of the 2024 season, Johnson returned a blocked field goal for a touchdown in a victory versus Baylor. In week five, he notched his first career interception off of quarterback Noah Fifita against Arizona. Johnson finished the 2024 season, totaling 70 tackles, four pass deflections, one interception, and a forced fumble.

On January 2, 2026, Johnson announced that he would enter the transfer portal.

=== UCLA ===
On January 9, 2026, Johnson announced that he would transfer to UCLA.
