= Bob Chesney =

American football coach (born 1977)

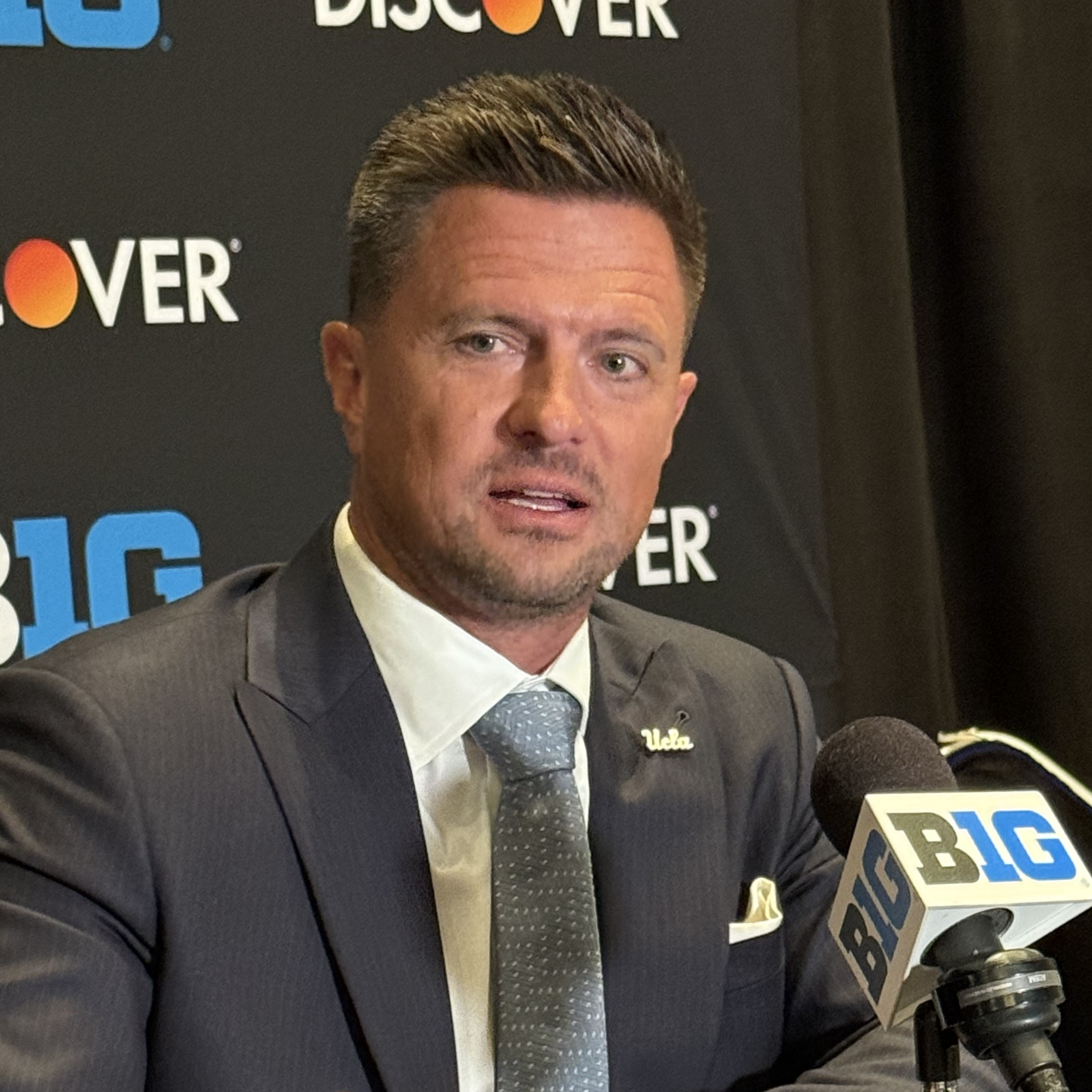
- Chesney at 2026 Big Ten Media Day

Current position
- Title: Head coach
- Team: UCLA
- Conference: Big Ten
- Record: 10–1

Biographical details
- Born: August 10, 1977 (age 49); Kulpmont, Pennsylvania, U.S.

Playing career
- 1996–1999: Dickinson
- Position: Defensive back

Coaching career (HC unless noted)
- 2000–2001: Norwich (GA)
- 2002: Delaware Valley (DC)
- 2003–2004: King's (PA) (ST)
- 2005–2006: Johns Hopkins (ST/DB)
- 2007–2008: Johns Hopkins (DC/ST/DB)
- 2009: Johns Hopkins (AHC/DC/DB)
- 2010–2012: Salve Regina
- 2013–2017: Assumption
- 2018–2023: Holy Cross
- 2024–2025: James Madison
- 2026–present: UCLA

Head coaching record
- Overall: 142–53
- Bowls: 2–0
- Tournaments: 3–3 (NCAA D-II playoffs); 2–3 (NCAA D-I playoffs); 0–1 (CFP)

Accomplishments and honors

Championships
- 2 NE-10 (2015, 2017); 5 Patriot League (2019–2023); Sun Belt (2025); Sun Belt East Division (2025)

Awards
- 2× second Team All-Centennial (1997–1998); 2× NE-10 Coach of the Year (2015, 2017); 3× Patriot League Coach of the Year (2019, 2021, 2022); American Football Coaches Association (AFCA) FCS Region 1 Coach of the Year (2022) * Sun Belt Coach of the Year (2025)

Robert Edward Chesney Jr. (born August 10, 1977) is an American college football coach who is the head coach at the University of California, Los Angeles. A graduate of Dickinson College, Chesney has served as the head coach at Salve Regina University, Assumption University, the College of the Holy Cross, and James Madison University. At Assumption, he led the Greyhounds to consecutive NCAA Division II Football Championship playoff appearances in the final three years of his tenure. At Holy Cross, he led the Crusaders to five straight Patriot League titles.

== Early life and family ==
Chesney is originally from Kulpmont, Pennsylvania, born to Robert Chesney Sr., and Claudia Chesney (née Yonkovig). He is of Polish, Ukrainian, and Rusyn descent. He is a Catholic. He has an older brother, Vincent Chesney, and a younger brother, Nicholas Chesney. Chesney is a 1996 graduate of Our Lady of Lourdes Regional High School and a 2000 graduate of Dickinson College. Married in 2007 to Andrea, he has two daughters and a son.

== Coaching career ==
=== Salve Regina ===
Chesney was hired as the fourth head coach in Salve Regina University football program history following his five-year stint as associate head coach at Johns Hopkins University. Chesney rebuilt a Salve Regina program which had a streak of eight-consecutive losing seasons before his tenure, upon which he posted three winning campaigns in a row.

=== Assumption ===
Following his success with that program, Chesney was hired as the tenth head coach in Assumption College (now Assumption University) football program history. Prior to his arrival the Assumption program had posted two winning seasons in the 17 previous years. Chesney led the Greyhounds to five-straight winning records and NCAA Tournament appearances in each of his last three years. Chesney coached 94 all-conference selections and 12 All-Americans.

=== Holy Cross ===
On December 14, 2017, Chesney was named the 28th head football coach at the College of the Holy Cross in Worcester, Massachusetts. Chesney’s tenure as head coach was transformational. Over six seasons he compiled a 44–21 overall record, including a dominant 28–4 mark in conference play. Under Chesney, Holy Cross claimed an unprecedented five straight Patriot League championships; the first team in league history to do so. His 2022 squad went 11–0 in the regular season (the program’s first undefeated regular season since 1991), finished 12–1 overall, and advanced to the FCS quarterfinals — the deepest playoff run for Holy Cross in nearly four decades. Across his Holy Cross years, Chesney earned Patriot League Coach of the Year honors three times (2019, 2021, 2022) and was named the AFCA FCS Region 1 Coach of the Year following the 2022 campaign.

=== James Madison ===
On December 7, 2023, Chesney was named the head football coach at James Madison University. In his first season Chesney led the Dukes to a 9–4 overall record and captured the program’s first bowl victory ever, a 27–17 win in the Boca Raton Bowl over Western Kentucky. In 2025, the Dukes had an 11–1 record and secured the Sun Belt East Division Championship. On December 5, James Madison defeated Troy in the Sun Belt Conference Championship game 31–14. Two days later, James Madison was selected for the College Football Playoff as the No. 12 seed.

=== UCLA ===
On December 6, 2025, Chesney was announced as the head football coach at UCLA. UCLA granted permission for Chesney to continue coaching JMU through its playoff run. He inherited a Bruins program that went 3–9 in 2025 and 6–12 in their first two seasons in the Big Ten Conference. After a 4–0 start in 2026, UCLA was ranked No. 23 in the AP poll, their first time in the top 25 in three years. Chesney became the second head coach to win their first four games with the Bruins, joining Red Sanders in 1949. He then became the first Bruins coach to begin 5–0 after a 17–15 upset on the road against No. 13 Oregon. It was UCLA's first road win against a ranked team since 2019.

== Head coaching record ==
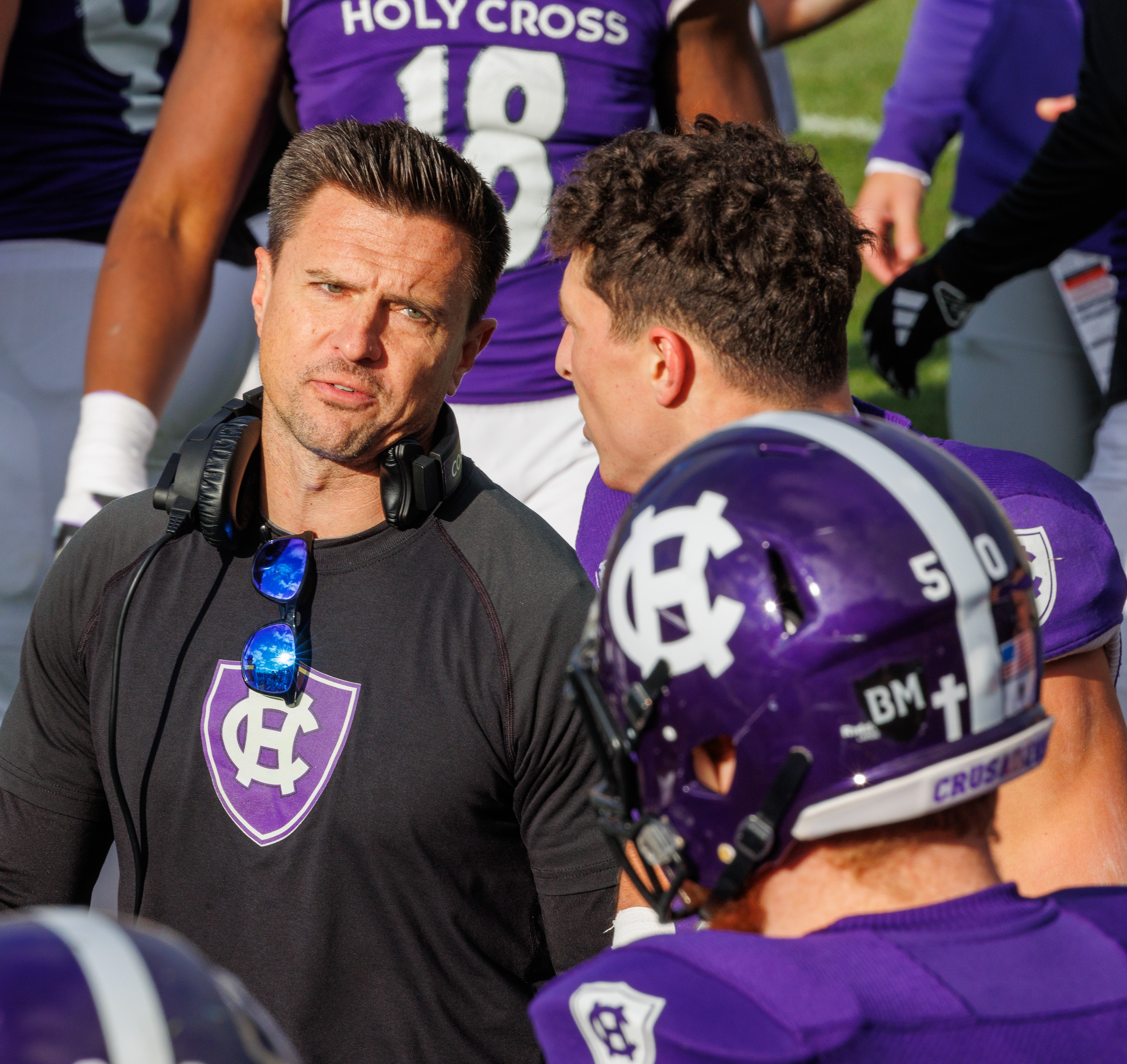
Chesney speaks with a Holy Cross player in 2023

Year	Team	Overall	Conference	Standing	Bowl/playoffs	Coaches^{#}	AP^{°}
Salve Regina Seahawks (New England Football Conference) (2010–2012)
2010	Salve Regina	6–4	5–3	3rd (Boyd)			
2011	Salve Regina	8–3	6–2	3rd (Boyd)	W ECAC Northwest		
2012	Salve Regina	9–2	7–1	1st (Boyd)		24	
Salve Regina:		23–9	18–6				
Assumption Greyhounds (Northeast-10 Conference) (2013–2017)
2013	Assumption	6–5	6–3	4th			
2014	Assumption	7–4	6–3	T–3rd			
2015	Assumption	11–2	8–1	1st	L NCAA Division II Second Round	17	
2016	Assumption	9–3	8–1	2nd	L NCAA Division II First Round	25	
2017	Assumption	11–2	8–1	1st	L NCAA Division II Quarterfinal	9	
Assumption:		44–16	36–9				
Holy Cross Crusaders (Patriot League) (2018–2023)
2018	Holy Cross	5–6	4–2	T–2nd			
2019	Holy Cross	7–6	5–1	1st	L NCAA Division I First Round		
2020	Holy Cross	3–1	2–0	1st	L NCAA Division I First Round	25	
2021	Holy Cross	10–3	6–0	1st	L NCAA Division I Second Round	22	19
2022	Holy Cross	12–1	6–0	1st	L NCAA Division I Quarterfinal	6	6
2023	Holy Cross	7–4	5–1	T–1st		25	
Holy Cross:		44–21	28–4				
James Madison Dukes (Sun Belt Conference) (2024–2025)
2024	James Madison	9–4	4–4	T–3rd (East)	W Boca Raton		
2025	James Madison	12–2	8–0	1st (East)	L CFP First Round^{†}	20	19
James Madison:		21–6	12–4				
UCLA Bruins (Big Ten Conference) (2026–present)
2026	UCLA	10–1	7–1				
UCLA:		10–1	7–1				
Total:		142–53					
National championship Conference title Conference division title or championship game berth
^{†}Indicates Bowl Coalition, Bowl Alliance, BCS, or CFP / New Years' Six bowl.; ^{#}Rankings from final Coaches Poll.; ^{°}Rankings from final AP Poll.
