= 2026 Washington Huskies football team =

American college football season

2026 Washington Huskies football
- Conference: Big Ten Conference
- Record: 7–4 (4–4 Big Ten)
- Head coach: Jedd Fisch (3rd season)
- Defensive coordinator: Ryan Walters (2nd season)
- Home stadium: Husky Stadium

Uniform

2026 Big Ten Conference football standings
	Conf.			Overall
Team	W		L	W		L
No. 4 UCLA	7	–	1	10	–	1
No. 8 Indiana	6	–	2	9	–	2
No. 15 Iowa	6	–	2	9	–	2
No. 13 Oregon	6	–	2	8	–	3
No. 18 USC	5	–	3	8	–	3
No. 14 Ohio State	5	–	3	7	–	4
Wisconsin	5	–	3	7	–	4
Nebraska	4	–	4	7	–	4
Washington	4	–	4	7	–	4
Illinois	4	–	4	6	–	5
Minnesota	4	–	4	6	–	5
Michigan	3	–	5	6	–	5
Northwestern	3	–	5	6	–	5
Penn State	3	–	5	6	–	5
Maryland	2	–	6	4	–	7
Purdue	2	–	6	3	–	8
Rutgers	2	–	6	3	–	8
Michigan State	1	–	7	3	–	8
Championship: December 5, 2026
^ – College Football Playoff participant; $ – Conference champion; y – Championship game participant; As of November 22, 2026; Rankings from CFP rankings

The 2026 Washington Huskies football team represents the University of Washington as a member of the Big Ten Conference during the 2026 NCAA Division I FBS football season. Led by third-year head coach Jedd Fisch, the Huskies play home games on campus at Husky Stadium located in Seattle.

This will be Washington's third season in the Big Ten, after over a century in the Pac-12 Conference and its predecessors.

The team will not name an offensive coordinator, and Fisch will be the head playcaller offensively after Jimmie Dougherty, the offensive coordinator in 2025, mutually parted ways with the program on February 19, 2026.

== Schedule ==
Date	Time	Opponent	Rank	Site	TV	Result	Attendance	Source
September 6	1:00 p.m.	Washington State*	No. 17	Husky Stadium; Seattle, WA (Apple Cup)	NBC	W 24–10	71,056	
September 12	12:30 p.m.	Utah State*	No. 19	Husky Stadium; Seattle, WA	BTN	W 16–14	62,152	
September 19	4:15 p.m.	Eastern Washington*		Husky Stadium; Seattle, WA	BTN	W 48–16	61,619	
September 26	8:00 p.m.	Minnesota		Husky Stadium; Seattle, WA	FOX	L 24–27	63,323	
October 3	4:30 p.m.	at No. 18 USC		Los Angeles Memorial Coliseum; Los Angeles, CA	NBC	L 21–25	59,136	
October 9	6:00 p.m.	No. 20 Iowa		Husky Stadium; Seattle, WA	FOX	L 24–41	66,231	
October 16	5:00 p.m.	at Purdue		Ross–Ade Stadium; West Lafayette, IN	FOX	W 38–26	50,941	
October 31	5:00 p.m.	at Nebraska		Memorial Stadium; Lincoln, NE	BTN	W 17–10	86,097	
November 7	12:30 p.m.	Penn State^{†}		Husky Stadium; Seattle, WA	FS1	L 25–28	67,879	
November 14	2:30 p.m.	at Michigan State		Spartan Stadium; East Lansing, MI	BTN	W 21–14	60,275	
November 21	12:30 p.m.	No. 8 Indiana		Husky Stadium; Seattle, WA	NBCSN/Peacock	W 27–24	64,614	
November 28	4:30 p.m.	at Oregon		Autzen Stadium; Eugene, OR (rivalry)	NBC			
*Non-conference game; ^{†}Homecoming; Rankings from AP Poll (and CFP Rankings, after November 3) – Released prior to game; All times are in Pacific time; Source:

== Preseason ==
=== Transfers ===
2026 Transfers
Name	Num	Pos.	Height	Weight	Year	Hometown	Transferred from
Christian Moss	5	WR	6'3"	205	Senior	Kennesaw, GA	Kennesaw State
Elijah Brown	7	QB	6'2"	205	Sophomore	Huntington Beach, CA	Stanford
Emmanuel Karnley	8	CB	6'0"	188	Junior	Antioch, CA	Virginia
Logan George	12	EDGE	6'4"	264	Junior	Pocatello, ID	Ohio State
Jayden Limar	17	RB	5'10"	205	Senior	Lake Stevens, WA	Oregon
Kai McClendon	18	DL	6'1"	334	Sophomore	Gulfport, MS	Mississippi State
Bodpegn Miller	18	WR	6'3"	200	(redshirt) Freshman	Mansfield, OH	Ohio State
Trey Cooley	22	RB	5'11"	208	Senior	Raleigh, NC	Troy
Darin Conley	33	DL	6'3"	290	Junior	Kansas City, MO	Ball State
Hunter McKee	38	K	6'3"	211	Sophomore	Spokane, WA	Eastern Washington
Kolt Dieterich	55	OT	6'6"	295	Junior	Riesel, TX	Sam Houston
DeSean Watts	58	DL	6'0"	313	Junior	Fresno, CA	Sacramento State
Hunter Green	93	P	6'4"	230	Senior	Redmond, WA	San Diego State
Tyler Robles	95	K	5'7"	178	Junior	Encinitas, CA	Texas State
Name	Num	Pos.	Height	Weight	Year	Hometown	Transferred to
Leroy Bryant	0	CB	6'0"	185	Sophomore	Fairfield, CA	Stanford
Kevin Green Jr.	0	WR	5'11"	165	Junior	Mission Hills, CA	TBD
Raiden Vines-Bright	7	WR	6'1"	200	Freshman	Tempe, AZ	Arizona State
Marcus Harris	11	WR	6'1"	190	Freshman	Eastvale, CA	UCLA
Audric Harris	13	WR	6'0"	190	Sophomore	Bellflower, CA	Hawaii
Deven Bryant	17	LB	5'11"	230	Sophomore	Carson, CA	USC
Caleb Smith	19	DL	6'5"	270	Freshman	Birmingham, AL	Alabama
Dyson McCutcheon	21	S	5'11"	182	Senior	Claremont, CA	Middle Tennessee
Jonathan Epperson Jr.	22	LB	6'0"	225	Freshman	Meridian, MS	Portland State
Adam Mohammed	24	RB	6'0"	220	Sophomore	Glendale, AZ	California
Vincent Holmes	27	S	6'0"	190	Sophomore	San Jacinto, CA	Oklahoma State
Ethan Moczulski	37	K	5'11"	200	Junior	Spokane, WA	Illinois
Paki Finau	53	IOL	6'5"	310	(redshirt) Freshman	Hesperia, CA	BYU
Zachary Henning	58	IOL	6'5"	310	Sophomore	Centennial, CO	Arizona
Davit Boyajyan	71	IOL	6'5"	310	(redshirt) Freshman	Clovis, CA	Cal Poly
Maximus McCree	77	OL	6'6"	302	Senior	Kansas City, MO	Washington State
Luke Gayton	83	WR	6'1"	195	(redshirt) Freshman	Palos Verdes Estates, CA	San Diego State
Hunter Solwold	84	LS	6'3"	240	Freshman	Fallston, MD	Florida
Bryce Butler	92	DL	6'5"	320	Junior	Toronto, ON	Texas Tech
Dominic Macon	93	DL	6'3"	310	Freshman	Savannah, GA	Oklahoma State
Jayvon Parker	94	DL	6'3"	330	Junior	Detroit, MI	Maryland
Armon Parker	95	DL	6'3"	320	Junior	Detroit, MI	Maryland
Dusty Zimmer	-	P	6'5"	230	Freshman	Adelaide, AUS	Southern Miss

== Rankings ==
Ranking movements Legend: ██ Increase in ranking ██ Decrease in ranking — = Not ranked RV = Received votes
	Week															
Poll	Pre	1	2	3	4	5	6	7	8	9	10	11	12	13	14	Final
AP	17	19	RV	RV	—	—	—	—	—	—	—	—				
Coaches	19	19	24	23	RV	—	—	—	—	—	—	—				
CFP	Not released									—	—	—				Not released

== Game summaries ==
=== Washington State (Apple Cup) ===
Washington State Cougars (0–0) at No. 17 Washington Huskies (0–0) – Game summary

Quarter	1	2	3	4	Total
Cougars	0	0	0	10	10
No. 17 Huskies	3	7	0	14	24

at Husky Stadium • Seattle, Washington

- Date: September 6
- Game time: 1:00 p.m. PDT
- Game weather: Sunny • Temperature: 71 °F (22 °C) • Wind: N at 7 miles per hour (11 km/h)
- Game attendance: 71,056
- Referee: John Love
- TV announcers (NBC): Paul Burmeister (Play-by-Play), Yogi Roth (Analyst), and Zora Stephenson (Sideline Reporter)
- Recap

Game information

First quarter

- WASH - Tyler Robles 48-yard field goal, 3:53. Huskies 3-0. Drive: 11 plays, 26 yards, 5:08.

Second quarter

- WASH - Demond Williams Jr. 5-yard rush (Tyler Robles kick), 10:09. Huskies 10-0. Drive: 5 plays, 21 yards, 2:18.

Third quarter

- No scoring plays.

Fourth quarter

- WSU - Caden Pinnick 11-yard rush (Jack Stevens kick), 10:15. Huskies 10-7. Drive: 9 plays, 62 yards, 5:16.
- WASH - Rashid Williams 1-yard pass from Demond Williams Jr. (Tyler Robles kick), 8:05. Huskies 17-7. Drive: 4 plays, 75 yards, 2:10.
- WSU - Jack Stevens 42-yard field goal, 4:30. Huskies 17-10. Drive: 8 plays, 46 yards, 3:35.
- WASH - Jayden Limar 11-yard run (Tyler Robles kick), 2:18. Huskies 24-10. Drive: 5 plays, 68 yards, 2:03.

Statistics	WSU	WASH
First downs	18	20
Plays–yards	56–242	64–402
Rushes–yards	31–100	29–134
Passing yards	142	268
Passing: comp–att–int	16–25–2	24–35–0
Turnovers	3	0
Time of possession	30:44	29:16

Team	Category	Player	Statistics
Washington State	Passing	Caden Pinnick	16/25, 142 yards
Washington State	Rushing	Caden Pinnick	14 carries, 61 yards, TD
Washington State	Receiving	Daniel Blood	5 receptions, 57 yards
Washington	Passing	Demond Williams Jr.	24/25, 268 yards, TD
Washington	Rushing	Demond Williams Jr.	7 carries, 61 yards, TD
Washington	Receiving	Chris Lawson	4 receptions, 87 yards

=== Utah State ===
Utah State Aggies (0–1) at No. 19 Washington Huskies (1–0) – Game summary

Quarter	1	2	3	4	Total
Aggies	0	7	0	7	14
No. 19 Huskies	0	10	0	6	16

at Husky Stadium • Seattle, Washington

- Date: September 12
- Game time: 12:30 p.m. PDT
- Game weather: Cloudy • Temperature: 66 °F (19 °C) • Wind: NW at 7 miles per hour (11 km/h)
- Game attendance: 62,152
- Referee: Matthew Richards
- TV announcers (BTN): A. J. Kanell (Play-by-Play), Marcel Reece (Analyst), and Alyssa Charlston-Smith (Sideline Reporter)

Game information

First quarter

- No scoring plays.

Second quarter

- (11:35) WASH - Tyler Robles 30-yard field goal (Drive: 9 plays, 43 yards, 3:29; Washington 3-0)
- (11:19) USU - Javon Robinson 78-yard pass from Grady Brosterhous (Kian Afrookhteh kick), (Drive: 1 play, 78 yards, 0:11; Utah State 7-3)
- (6:41) WASH - Ansu Sanoe 1-yard run (Tyler Robles kick), (Drive: 8 plays, 65 yards, 4:38; Washington 10-7)

Third quarter

- No scoring plays.

Fourth quarter

- (12:54) WASH - Tyler Robles 26-yard field goal (Drive: 7 plays, 51 yards, 2:12; Washington 13-7)
- (6:28) WASH - Tyler Robles 43-yard field goal (Drive: 7 plays, 19 yards, 3:20; Washington 16-7)
- (1:50) USU - Eli Wood 7-yard pass from Grady Brosterhous (Kian Afrookhteh kick), (Drive: 13 plays, 75 yards, 4:38; Washington 16-14)

Statistics	USU	WASH
First downs	14	18
Plays–yards	58–271	74–356
Rushes–yards	29–75	33–107
Passing yards	196	249
Passing: comp–att–int	17–29–3	26–41–0
Turnovers	3	0
Time of possession	24:55	35:05

Team	Category	Player	Statistics
Utah State	Passing	Grady Brosterhous	17/28, 196 yards, 2 TD, 3 INT
Utah State	Rushing	Grady Brosterhous	21 carries, 81 yards
Utah State	Receiving	Javon Robinson	3 receptions, 100 yards, TD
Washington	Passing	Demond Williams Jr.	26/41, 249 yards
Washington	Rushing	Demond Williams Jr.	11 carries, 56 yards
Washington	Receiving	Dezmen Roebuck	7 receptions, 59 yards

=== Eastern Washington (FCS) ===
Eastern Washington Eagles (FCS) (1–2) at Washington Huskies (2–0) – Game summary

Quarter	1	2	3	4	Total
Eagles (FCS)	3	7	3	3	16
Huskies	14	17	7	10	48

at Husky Stadium • Seattle, Washington

- Date: September 19
- Game time: 4:15 p.m. PDT
- Game weather: Sunny • Temperature: 65 °F (18 °C) • Wind: SE at 2 miles per hour (3.2 km/h)
- Game attendance: 61,619
- Referee: Chris Coyte
- TV announcers (BTN): A. J. Kanell (Play-by-Play), Marcel Reece (Analyst), and Alyssa Charlston-Smith (Sideline Reporter)

Game information

First quarter

- (10:50) WASH - Chris Lawson 15-yard pass from Demond Williams Jr. (Tyler Robles kick), (Drive: 8 plays, 74 yards, 4:06; Washington 7-0)
- (5:56) EWU - Soren McKee 20-yard field goal (Drive: 9 plays, 43 yards, 4:54; Washington 7-3)
- (0:45) WASH - Rashid Williams 5-yard pass from Demond Williams Jr. (Tyler Robles kick), (Drive: 10 plays, 73 yards, 5:06; Washington 14-3)

Second quarter

- (13:47) EWU - Nate Bell 14-yard run (Soren McKee kick), (Drive: 5 plays, 83 yards, 1:53; Washington 14-10)
- (7:47) WASH - Jordan Clay 78-yard pass from Demond Williams Jr. (Tyler Robles kick), (Drive: 3 plays, 45 yards, 1:22; Washington 21-10)
- (3:30) WASH - Rashid Williams 18-yard pass from Demond Williams Jr. (Tyler Robles kick), (Drive: 7 plays, 50 yards, 3:22; Washington 28-10)
- (0:08) WASH - Tyler Robles 25-yard field goal (Drive: 8 plays, 72 yards, 0:59; Washington 31-10)

Third quarter

- (10:44) EWU - Soren McKee 37-yard field goal (Drive: 10 plays, 55 yards, 4:16; Washington 31-13)
- (3:08) WASH - Ansu Sanoe 1-yard run (Tyler Robles kick), (Drive: 5 plays, 93 yards, 2:23; Washington 38-13)

Fourth quarter

- (10:44) EWU - Soren McKee 43-yard field goal (Drive: 13 plays, 49 yards, 5:01; Washington 38-16)
- (6:28) WASH - Tyler Robles 32-yard field goal (Drive: 5 plays, 16 yards, 2:38; Washington 41-16)
- (1:50) WASH - Trez Davis 1-yard run (Tyler Robles kick), (Drive: 6 plays, 32 yards, 2:42; Washington 48-16)

Statistics	EWU	WASH
First downs	22	23
Plays–yards	75–315	62–546
Rushes–yards	46–142	26–148
Passing yards	173	398
Passing: comp–att–int	15–29–0	29–36–1
Turnovers	1	1
Time of possession	30:13	29:47

Team	Category	Player	Statistics
Eastern Washington	Passing	Nate Bell	13/24, 150 yards
Eastern Washington	Rushing	Nate Bell	17 carries, 50 yards, TD
Eastern Washington	Receiving	Rylin Lang	3 receptions, 56 yards
Washington	Passing	Demond Williams Jr.	27/33, 373 yards, 4 TD, INT
Washington	Rushing	Brian Bonner	6 carries, 81 yards
Washington	Receiving	Dezmen Roebuck	9 receptions, 121 yards

=== Minnesota ===
Minnesota Golden Gophers (2–1) at Washington Huskies (3–0) – Game summary

Quarter	1	2	3	4	Total
Golden Gophers	14	7	3	3	27
Huskies	0	10	0	14	24

at Husky Stadium • Seattle, Washington

- Date: September 26
- Game time: 8:00 p.m. PDT
- Game weather: Clear • Temperature: 56 °F (13 °C) • Wind: NNW at 6 miles per hour (9.7 km/h)
- Game attendance: 63,323
- Referee: Kole Knueppel
- TV announcers (FOX): Jack Kizer (play-by-play) and Mark Helfrich (analyst)

Statistics	MINN	WASH
First downs	18	16
Plays–yards	62–329	55–279
Rushes–yards	33–125	27–40
Passing yards	204	239
Passing: comp–att–int	21–29–1	18–28–2
Turnovers	1	2
Time of possession	36:01	23:59

Team	Category	Player	Statistics
Minnesota	Passing	Drake Lindsey	21/29, 204 yards, 3 TDs, INT
Minnesota	Rushing	TJ Thomas	11 carries, 78 yards
Minnesota	Receiving	Javon Tracy	7 carries, 41 yards, TD
Washington	Passing	Demond Williams Jr.	18/28, 239 yards, 2 TDs, 2 INTs
Washington	Rushing	Brian Bonner Jr. Demond Williams Jr.	7 carries, 23 yards 15 carries, 15 yards, TD
Washington	Receiving	Dezmen Roebuck; Baron Naone	7 receptions, 87 yards, TD; 3 receptions, 32 yards, TD

=== at No. 18 USC ===
Washington Huskies (3–1) at No. 18 USC Trojans (4–1) – Game summary

Quarter	1	2	3	4	Total
Huskies	7	7	7	0	21
No. 18 Trojans	3	7	12	3	25

at Los Angeles Memorial Coliseum • Los Angeles, California

- Date: October 3
- Game time: 4:30 p.m. PDT
- Game weather: Sunny • Temperature: 98 °F (37 °C) • Wind: SW at 10 miles per hour (16 km/h)
- Game attendance: 59,136
- Referee: Jason Nickleby
- TV announcers (NBC): Noah Eagle (Play-by-Play), Todd Blackledge (Analyst), and Kathryn Tappen (Sideline Reporter)

Game information

First Quarter

- (8:35) USC - Caden Chittenden 26-yard field goal (Drive: 9 plays, 75 yards, 5:04; USC 3-0)
- (1:46) Washington - Baron Naone 5-yard pass from Dezmen Roebuck (Tyler Robles kick), (Drive: 8 plays, 41 yards, 4:21; Washington 7-3)

Second Quarter

- (9:58) USC - Waymond Jordan 8-yard rush (Caden Chittenden kick), (Drive: 5 plays, 61 yards, 2:37; USC 10-7)
- (1:50) Washington - Cade Eldridge 1-yard rush (Tyler Robles kick), (Drive: 8 plays, 80 yards, 3:25; Washington 14-10)

Third Quarter

- (13:30) Washington - Decker DeGraaf 42-yard pass from Demond Williams Jr. (Tyler Robles kick), (Drive: 2 plays, 60 yards, 0:48; Washington 21-10)
- (6:30) USC - Tanook Hines 10-yard pass from Jayden Maiava (Jonas Williams Two-Point Conversation rush is no good), (Drive: 13 plays, 75 yards, 7:00; Washington 21-16)
- (4:40) USC - Jahkeem Stewart 48-yard fumble recovery (Boobie Feaster Two-Point Conversation rush is no good), (USC 22-21)

Fourth Quarter

- (9:36) USC - Caden Chittenden 39-yard field goal (Drive: 16 plays, 77 yards, 7:59; USC 25-21)

Statistics	WASH	USC
First downs	15	21
Plays–yards	60–319	69–360
Rushes–yards	33–116	35–115
Passing yards	203	245
Passing: comp–att–int	16–27–0	21–34–1
Turnovers	1	1
Time of possession	25:02	34:58

Team	Category	Player	Statistics
Washington	Passing	Demond Williams Jr.	15/26, 198 yards, TD
Washington	Rushing	Brian Bonner Jr.	19 carries, 89 yards
Washington	Receiving	Chris Lawson	5 receptions, 82 yards
USC	Passing	Jayden Maiava	21/34, 245 yards, TD, INT
USC	Rushing	King Miller	18 carries, 81 yards
USC	Receiving	Tanook Hines	6 receptions, 51 yards, TD

=== No. 20 Iowa ===
No. 20 Iowa Hawkeyes (4–1) at Washington Huskies (3–2) – Game summary

Quarter	1	2	3	4	Total
No. 20 Hawkeyes	13	14	7	7	41
Huskies	0	3	15	6	24

at Husky Stadium • Seattle, Washington

- Date: October 9
- Game time: 6:00 p.m. PDT
- Game weather: 57 °F (14 °C), Cloudy, Wind E 8 mph (13 km/h)
- Game attendance: 66,231
- Referee: Jim Wharrie
- TV announcers (FOX): Connor Onion, Robert Griffin III, and Alexa Landestoy

Game information

First quarter

- 12:30 IOWA – Caden Buhr 51-yard field goal (Drive: 7 plays, 32 yards, 2:30; Iowa 3–0)
- 7:07 IOWA – Caden Buhr 27-yard field goal (Drive: 8 plays, 56 yards, 3:18; Iowa 6–0)
- 0:10 IOWA – Kamari Moulton 56-yard run (Caden Buhr kick) (Drive: 1 play, 56 yards, 0:14; Iowa 13–0)

Second quarter

- 9:05 IOWA – DJ Vonnahme 20-yard pass from Jeremy Hecklinski (Caden Buhr kick) (Drive: 8 plays, 69 yards, 4:29; Iowa 20–0)
- 5:07 IOWA – DJ Vonnahme 24-yard pass from Jeremy Hecklinski (Caden Buhr kick) (Drive: 5 plays, 69 yards, 2:00; Iowa 27–0)
- 1:56 WASH – Tyler Robles 30-yard field goal (Drive: 12 plays, 63 yards, 3:11; Iowa 27–3)

Third quarter

- 11:10 WASH – Chris Lawson 10-yard pass from Elijah Brown (Tyler Robles) (Drive: 8 plays, 75 yards, 3:50; Iowa 27–10)
- 7:05 IOWA – Reece Vander Zee 16-yard pass from Jeremy Hecklinski (Caden Buhr kick) (Drive: 8 plays, 83 yards, 3:59; Iowa 34–10)
- 1:25 WASH – Dezmen Roebuck 2-yard pass from Elijah Brown (Chris Lawson pass from Elijah Brown) (Drive: 11 plays, 75 yards, 5:40; Iowa 34–18)

Fourth quarter

- 12:06 IOWA – Kamari Moulton 3-yard run (Caden Buhr kick) (Drive: 8 plays, 75 yards, 4:19; Iowa 41–18)
- 0:00 WASH – Mason James 3-yard pass from Elijah Brown (Drive: 12 plays, 84 yards, 3:15; Iowa 41–24)

Statistics	IOWA	WASH
First downs	22	24
Plays–yards	57–465	76–317
Rushes–yards	38–263	25–(–3)
Passing yards	202	320
Passing: comp–att–int	14–19–0	34–51–0
Time of possession	28:19	31:41

Team	Category	Player	Statistics
Iowa	Passing	Jeremy Hecklinski	14/19, 202 yards, 3 TD
Iowa	Rushing	Kamari Moulton	26 carries, 208 yards, 2 TD
Iowa	Receiving	Reece Vander Zee	3 receptions, 69 yards, TD
Washington	Passing	Elijah Brown	28/39, 251 yards, 3 TD
Washington	Rushing	Brian Bonner Jr.	10 carries, 17 yards
Washington	Receiving	Chris Lawson	8 receptions, 86 yards, TD

=== at Purdue ===
Washington Huskies (3–3) at Purdue Boilermakers (3–3) – Game summary

Quarter	1	2	3	4	Total
Huskies	7	17	0	14	38
Boilermakers	3	14	3	6	26

at Ross–Ade Stadium • West Lafayette, Indiana

- Date: October 16
- Game time: 5:00 p.m. PDT
- Game weather: Cloudy • Temperature: 50 °F (10 °C) • Wind: N at 15 miles per hour (24 km/h)
- Game attendance: 50,941
- Referee: Bryan Banks
- TV announcers (FOX): Dan Hellie (play-by-play) and Robert Smith (analyst)

Game information
First quarter
- WASH – Decker DeGraaf 2-yard pass from Elijah Brown (Tyler Robles kick), 6:19. Huskies 7–0. Drive: 10 plays, 61 yards, 5:20.
- PUR – Jacobo Echeverria Lozano 24-yard field goal, 1:54. Huskies 7–3. Drive: 6 plays, 14 yards, 2:06.

Second quarter

- WASH – Tyler Robles 25-yard field goal, 12:40. Huskies 10–3. Drive: 8 plays, 68 yards, 4:14.
- PUR – Antonio Harris 1-yard run (Jacobo Echeverria Lozano kick), 8:28. Tied 10–10. Drive: 8 plays, 87 yards, 4:12.
- WASH – Brian Bonner Jr. 25-yard pass from Elijah Brown (Tyler Robles kick), 6:27. Huskies 17–10. Drive: 5 plays, 79 yards, 1:57.
- PUR – Fame Ijeboi 10-yard pass from Ryan Browne (Jacobo Echeverria Lozano kick), 2:35. Tied 17–17. Drive: 1 plays, 10 yards, 0:04.'
- WASH – Brian Bonner Jr. 1-yard run (Tyler Robles kick), 0:27. Huskies 24–17. Drive: 9 plays, 91 yards, 2:07.

Third quarter

- PUR – Jacobo Echeverria Lozano 48-yard field goal, 3:33. Huskies 24–20. Drive: 6 plays, 11 yards, 3:11.

Fourth quarter

- WASH – Dezmen Roebuck 4-yard pass from Elijah Brown (Tyler Robles kick), 14:12. Huskies 31–20. Drive: 9 plays, 75 yards, 4:21.
- PUR – Ryan Browne 8-yard run (Ryan Browne–George Burhenn pass failed), 11:18. Huskies 31–26. Drive: 7 plays, 75 yards, 2:54.
- WASH – Trey Cooley 53-yard run (Tyler Robles kick), 10:30. Huskies 38–26. Drive: 2 plays, 75 yards, 0:48.

Statistics	WASH	PUR
First downs	24	19
Plays–yards	61–488	68–371
Rushes–yards	34–186	27–98
Passing yards	302	273
Passing: comp–att–int	21–27–3	21–41–2
Time of possession	29:16	30:44

Team	Category	Player	Statistics
Washington	Passing	Elijah Brown	21/27, 302 yards, 3 TD, 3 INT
Washington	Rushing	Trey Cooley	8 carries, 113 yards, TD
Washington	Receiving	Chris Lawson	6 receptions, 103 yards
Purdue	Passing	Ryan Browne	21/41, 273 yards, TD, 2 INT
Purdue	Rushing	Antonio Harris	4 carries, 65 yards, TD
Purdue	Receiving	Asaad Waseem	9 receptions, 116 yards

=== at Nebraska ===
Washington Huskies (4–3) at Nebraska Cornhuskers (5–2) – Game summary

Quarter	1	2	3	4	Total
Huskies	0	3	0	14	17
Cornhuskers	7	0	0	3	10

at Memorial Stadium • Lincoln, Nebraska

- Date: October 31
- Game time: 5:00 p.m. PDT
- Game weather: Cloudy • Temperature: 60 °F (16 °C) • Wind: E at 5 miles per hour (8.0 km/h)
- Game attendance: 86,097
- Referee: Francisco Villar
- TV announcers (BTN): Wayne Randazzo (play by play), Rhett Lewis (analyst), and Caroline Hendershot (Sideline Reporter)

Game information

First Quarter

- (1:40) NEB - Carter Nelson 24-yard pass from Anthony Colandrea (Kyle Cunanan kick) (Drive: 10 plays, 95 yards, 4:18, Nebraska 7-0)

Second Quarter

- (0:41) WASH – Tyler Robles 50-yard field goal (Drive: 9 plays, 56 yards, 01:12, Nebraska 7–3)

Third Quarter

(No Scoring)

Fourth Quarter

- (1:30) WASH – Chris Lawson 25-yard pass from Demond Williams (Tyler Robles kick) (Drive: 12 plays, 81 yards, 2:59, Washington 10-7)
- (1:15) WASH - Alex McLaughlin 48-yard interception return (Tyler Robles kick) (0:15, Washington 17-7)
- (0:31) NEB - John Hohl 42-yard field goal (Drive: 7 plays, 39 yards, 0:36, Washington 17-10)

Statistics	WASH	NEB
First downs	17	21
Plays–yards	62-267	74-387
Rushes–yards	19-32	29-132
Passing yards	235	255
Passing: comp–att–int	26-43-0	24-45-3
Time of possession	29:18	30:42

Team	Category	Player	Statistics
Washington	Passing	Elijah Brown	19-30, 136 yds
Washington	Rushing	Demond Williams Jr.	4 car, 28 yds
Washington	Receiving	Chris Lawson	12 rec, 155 yds, 1 TD
Nebraska	Passing	Anthony Colandrea	24-44, 255 yds, 1 TD, 3 INT
Nebraska	Rushing	Jamal Rule	13 car, 72 yds
Nebraska	Receiving	Jacory Barney Jr.	6 rec, 65 yds

=== Penn State ===
Penn State Nittany Lions (4–4) at Washington Huskies (5–3) – Game summary

Quarter	1	2	3	4	Total
Nittany Lions	7	21	0	0	28
Huskies	3	3	11	8	25

at Husky Stadium • Seattle, Washington

- Date: November 7
- Game time: 3:30 p.m.
- Game weather: Cloudy
- Game attendance: 67,879
- Referee: Gregory Blum

Statistics	PSU	WASH
First downs	21	15
Plays–yards	64–414	58–306
Rushes–yards	37–174	25–134
Passing yards	240	172
Passing: comp–att–int	16–27–0	19–33–1
Time of possession	31:14	28:46

Team	Category	Player	Statistics
Penn State	Passing	Rocco Becht	16/27, 240 yards, 2 TD
Penn State	Rushing	Carson Hansen	14 carries, 119 yards, 1 TD
Penn State	Receiving	Chase Sowell	4 receptions, 125 yards, 1 TD
Washington	Passing	Demond Williams Jr.	19/33, 172 yards, 2 TD, 1 INT
Washington	Rushing	Jayden Limar	9 carries, 66 yards
Washington	Receiving	Chris Lawson	5 receptions, 89 yards

=== at Michigan State ===
Washington Huskies (5–4) at Michigan State Spartans (3–6) – Game summary

Quarter	1	2	3	4	Total
Huskies	7	7	0	0	14
Spartans	7	7	0	7	21

at Spartan Stadium • East Lansing, Michigan

- Date: November 14
- Game time: 2:30 p.m.
- Game weather: Cloudy
- Game attendance: 60,275
- Referee: Jason Nickleby
- TV: BTN

Statistics	WASH	MSU
First downs	17	20
Plays–yards	55–332	71–342
Rushes–yards	22–44	36–100
Passing yards	288	242
Passing: comp–att–int	22–33–0	21–35–1
Time of possession	27:19	32:41

Team	Category	Player	Statistics
Washington	Passing	Demond Williams Jr.	22/33, 288 yards, 2 TD
Washington	Rushing	Jayden Limar	10 carries, 29 yards, 1 TD
Washington	Receiving	Chris Lawson	5 receptions, 124 yards, 2 TD
Michigan State	Passing	Cam Fancher	14/22, 134 yards, 1 TD, 1 INT
Michigan State	Rushing	Brandon Tullis	21 carries, 82 yards
Michigan State	Receiving	Fredrick Moore	4 receptions, 66 yards

=== No. 8 Indiana ===
No. 8 Indiana Hoosiers (9–1) at Washington Huskies (6–4) – Game summary

Quarter	1	2	3	4	OT	Total
No. 8 Hoosiers	14	0	3	7	0	24
Huskies	14	0	0	10	3	27

at Husky Stadium • Seattle, Washington

- Date: November 21
- TV announcers (NBCSN/Peacock): Paul Burmeister (play-by-play), Yogi Roth (analyst), and Caroline Pineda (sideline reporter)

Statistics	IU	WASH
First downs		
Plays–yards		
Rushes–yards		
Passing yards		
Passing: comp–att–int		
Time of possession		

Team	Category	Player	Statistics
Indiana	Passing		
Indiana	Rushing		
Indiana	Receiving		
Washington	Passing		
Washington	Rushing		
Washington	Receiving		

=== at Oregon ===
Washington Huskies (0–0) at Oregon Ducks (0–0) – Game summary

Quarter	1	2	3	4	Total
Huskies	0	0	0	0	0
Ducks	0	0	0	0	0

at Autzen Stadium • Eugene, Oregon

- Date: November 28

Statistics	WASH	ORE
First downs		
Plays–yards		
Rushes–yards		
Passing yards		
Passing: comp–att–int		
Time of possession		

Team	Category	Player	Statistics
Washington	Passing		
Washington	Rushing		
Washington	Receiving		
Oregon	Passing		
Oregon	Rushing		
Oregon	Receiving		

== Roster ==
2026 Washington Huskies football team roster
Players
Coaches
Offense

Pos.	#	Name	Class
QB	1	Demond Williams Jr.	Jr
WR	2	Dezmen Roebuck	So
WR	3	Rashid Williams	Jr
RB	4	Jordan Washington	So
WR	5	Christian Moss	Sr
WR	6	Mason James	Fr
QB	7	Elijah Brown	So
WR	8	Chris Lawson	So
QB	9	Dash Beierly	Fr
QB	10	Treston McMillan	Fr
WR	11	Jordan Clay	Fr
WR	12	Trez Davis	Fr
QB	15	Derek Zammit	Fr
WR	16	Justice Williams	So
RB	17	Jayden Limar	Sr
WR	18	Bodpegn Miller	So
RB	20	D'Aryhian Clemons	Fr
RB	21	Quaid Carr	Fr
RB	22	Trey Cooley	Sr
RB	25	Beck Walker	Sr
RB	29	Julian McMahan	Fr
RB	30	Ansu Sanoe	Fr
RB	32	Ryken Moon	Fr
RB	34	Brian Bonner Jr.	Fr
WR	35	Jace Burton	So
TE	44	Kade Eldridge	Jr
TE	45	Austin Simmons	Fr
OL	54	Parker Cross	Jr
OL	55	Kolt Dieterich	Jr
OL	56	Geirean Hatchett	Sr
OL	65	Jack Shaffer	Fr
OL	66	Landen Hatchett	Sr
OL	67	Aidan Anderson	Jr
OL	68	Soane Faasalo	Jr
OL	70	Justin Hylkema	Fr
OL	71	Ah Deong Reti Yang	Fr
OL	72	John Mills	So
OL	73	Champ Taulealea	Fr
OL	74	Drew Azzopardi	Sr
OL	75	Lowen Colman-Brusa	Fr
OL	76	Kodi Greene	Fr
OL	77	Elishah Jackett	Jr
OL	78	Jake Flores	Fr
OL	79	Dominic Harris	Fr
WR	80	Blaise LaVista	Fr
WR	81	Asa Thompson	Fr
WR	82	Deji Ajose	Fr
TE	84	Kekua Aumua	Fr
TE	85	Baron Naone	So
TE	86	Decker DeGraaf	Jr
TE	88	Sam Vyhlidal	Fr
TE	89	Charlie Crowell	So

Defense

Pos.	#	Name	Class
LB	0	Taariq Al-Uqdah	Jr
S	2	Rahshawn Clark	So
S	3	Rylon Dillard-Allen	So
S	4	C. J. Christian	Sr
DL	5	Derek Colman-Brusa	Fr
CB	6	Dylan Robinson	So
S	7	Alex McLaughlin	Sr
CB	8	Emmanuel Karnley	Jr
LB	9	Jacob Manu	Sr
LB	10	Xe'ree Alexander	Sr
EDGE	11	Ramzak Fruean	Fr
EDGE	12	Logan George	Jr
CB	13	Rahsjon Duncan	Fr
S	15	Rahim Wright II	So
CB	16	Ramonz Adams Jr.	Fr
CB	17	Elijah Durr	Fr
DL	18	Kai McClendon	So
S	21	Gavin Day	Fr
LB	23	Zaydrius Rainey-Sale	So
CB	24	Jeron Jones	Fr
LB	25	Donovan Robinson Jr.	Fr
CB	26	Elias Jackson	So
CB	28	Ksani Jiles	Fr
CB	30	Kayden Greene	So
S	31	Paul Mencke Jr.	So
DL	33	Darin Conley	Jr
LB	40	Ezaya Tokio	Fr
EDGE	44	Hayden Moore	Jr
EDGE	48	Jacob Lane	Sr
DL	50	David Schwerzel	Fr
EDGE	52	Devin Hyde	So
DL	54	J. D. Hill	Fr
EDGE	55	Victor Sanchez Hernandez	Fr
DL	56	Ta'a Malu	Fr
DL	58	DeSean Watts	Jr
DL	64	Tufanua Ionatana Umu-Cais	Fr
DL	90	Elinneus Davis	Jr
EDGE	91	Isaiah Ward	Sr
DL	94	Joseph Peko	Fr
DL	98	Omar Khan	So
EDGE	99	Russell Davis II	Sr

Special teams

Pos.	#	Name	Class
LS	33	Ryan Kean	Sr
K	36	C. J. Wallace	Fr
K	38	Hunter McKee	So
P	45	Luke Dunne	Jr
P	93	Hunter Green	Sr
K	95	Tyler Robles	Jr

Head coach

- Jedd Fisch

Coordinators/assistant coaches

- Scottie Graham – Assistant head coach/running backs
- Kevin Cummings – Pass game coordinator/wide receivers
- Michael Switzer – Offensive line
- Jordan Paopao – Tight ends
- J. P. Losman – Quarterbacks
- Matt Cavanaugh – Senior offensive assistant
- Luke Del Rio – Assistant wide receivers
- Mike Brewster – Assistant offensive line
- Dom Caldwell – Quality control, running backs
- Jacob Smith – Quality control, offense
- Kekoa Crawford – Graduate assistant, offense
- Sam Barry – Graduate assistant, offense
- Ryan Walters – Defensive coordinator
- Jason Kaufusi – Run game coordinator/defensive line
- Brian Odom – Inside linebackers
- John Richardson – Secondary
- Taylor Mays – Safeties
- Aaron Van Horn – Outside linebackers
- Martell Irby – Quality control, defense
- Ben Ford – Quality control, defense
- Austin Karr – Quality control, defense
- Korey Rush – Quality control, defense
- Chris Petrilli – Special teams coordinator
- Brett Arkelian – Special teams analyst
- Tyler Owens – Director, strength and conditioning
- Aaron Brosz – Associate, strength and conditioning
- Lance Ancar – Assistant, strength and conditioning
- Morris Henry Jr. – Assistant, strength and conditioning
- Cadillac Mitchell – Assistant, strength and conditioning

Legend

- (C) Team captain
- (S) Suspended
- (I) Ineligible
- Injured
- Redshirt

Roster
Last update: 06/17/26
