= 2025 ReliaQuest Bowl =

Postseason college football bowl game

- 40th ReliaQuest Bowl
Iowa Hawkeyes	Vanderbilt Commodores
(8–4)	(10–2)
Big Ten	SEC
34	27
Head coach: Kirk Ferentz	Head coach: Clark Lea
AP / Coaches / CFP; RV / RV / 23	AP / Coaches / CFP; 13 / 12 / 14
	1	2	3	4	Total
Iowa	7	7	10	10	34
Vanderbilt	0	3	14	10	27
- Date: December 31, 2025
- Season: 2025
- Stadium: Raymond James Stadium
- Location: Tampa, Florida
- MVP: Mark Gronowski (QB, Iowa)
- Favorite: Vanderbilt by 5.5
- Referee: Nate Black (ACC)
- Attendance: 35,382

United States TV coverage
- Network: ESPN; ESPN Radio
- Announcers: Roy Philpott (play-by-play), Sam Acho (analyst), and Taylor Davis (sideline) (ESPN); Sean Kelley (play-by-play), Rene Ingoglia (analyst), and Mike Peasley (sideline) (ESPN Radio)

The 2025 ReliaQuest Bowl was a college football bowl game played on December 31, 2025, at Raymond James Stadium in Tampa, Florida. The 40th annual ReliaQuest Bowl (though only the fourth under that name) began at approximately 12:00 p.m. EST and aired on ESPN. It was one of the 2025–26 bowl games concluding the 2025 FBS football season. The game's title sponsor was the ReliaQuest cybersecurity company.

The Iowa Hawkeyes from the Big Ten Conference defeated the Vanderbilt Commodores from the Southeastern Conference (SEC), 34–27.

== Teams ==
The game featured the Iowa Hawkeyes from the Big Ten Conference and the Vanderbilt Commodores from the Southeastern Conference (SEC). The two football programs had never played each other. Iowa had a 3–3 record in six prior appearances in the ReliaQuest Bowl (previously played as the Outback Bowl and Hall of Fame Bowl), while Vanderbilt played in this bowl for the first time.

=== Iowa Hawkeyes ===
Iowa compiled an overall 8–4 record (6–3 in Big Ten play) and was ranked in four of six CFP polls released. All their losses were to ranked opponents – at Iowa State, Indiana, Oregon, and at USC – by a combined 15 points. The Hawkeyes did not defeat any ranked teams, though they maintained possession of three rivalry trophies by defeating Wisconsin, Minnesota, and Nebraska by a combined score of 118–19.

=== Vanderbilt Commodores ===
Vanderbilt posted an overall 10–2 record (6–2 in SEC play), establishing a school-record for wins, and was ranked from mid-September onward. Both of their losses were to ranked opponents on the road: Alabama and Texas. The Commodores defeated four ranked teams: South Carolina, LSU, Missouri, and Tennessee.

== Game summary ==
2025 ReliaQuest Bowl

Quarter	1	2	3	4	Total
No. 23 Iowa	7	7	10	10	34
No. 14 Vanderbilt	0	3	14	10	27

at Raymond James Stadium • Tampa, Florida

- Date: Wednesday, December 31, 2025
- Game time: 12:00 p.m. EST
- Game weather: Sunny • Temperature: 53 °F (12 °C) • Wind: 6 mph (9.7 km/h) northwest
- Game attendance: 35,382
- Referee: Nate Black
- TV announcers (ESPN): Roy Philpott (play-by-play), Sam Acho (analyst), and Taylor Davis (sideline)
- Box score

Scoring summary

Quarter	Time	Drive			Team	Scoring information	Score	
Quarter	Time	Plays	Yards	TOP	Team	Scoring information	IOWA	VAN
1	12:55	5	72	2:00	IOWA	Kamari Moulton 4-yard touchdown run, Drew Stevens kick good	7	0
2	7:49	13	59	7:05	VAN	41-yard field goal by Brock Taylor	7	3
2	0:41	1	10	0:02	IOWA	Reece Vander Zee 10-yard touchdown reception from Mark Gronowski, Drew Stevens kick good	14	3
3	8:50	6	58	3:18	IOWA	DJ Vonnahme 21-yard touchdown reception from Mark Gronowski, Drew Stevens kick good	21	3
3	8:37	1	75	0:09	VAN	Tre Richardson 75-yard touchdown reception from Diego Pavia, Brock Taylor kick good	21	10
3	3:54	4	9	1:29	IOWA	47-yard field goal by Drew Stevens	24	10
3	1:41	8	70	2:06	VAN	Joseph McVay 16-yard touchdown reception from Diego Pavia, Brock Taylor kick good	24	17
4	13:35	6	70	2:59	IOWA	Mark Gronowski 1-yard touchdown run, Drew Stevens kick good	31	17
4	11:19	5	72	2:11	VAN	Diego Pavia 11-yard touchdown run, Brock Taylor kick good	31	24
4	4:13	13	49	7:06	IOWA	44-yard field goal by Drew Stevens	34	24
4	2:58	7	60	1:10	VAN	37-yard field goal by Brock Taylor	34	27
"TOP" = time of possession. For other American football terms, see Glossary of American football.							34	27

=== Statistics ===
Statistics	IOWA	VAN
First downs	19	21
Plays–yards	59–379	60–398
Rushes–yards	37–167	22–51
Passing yards	212	347
Passing: comp–att–int	16–22–1	25–38–0
Turnovers		
Time of possession	32:13	27:37

Team	Category	Player	Statistics
Iowa	Passing	Mark Gronowski	16–22, 212 yards, 2 TD, INT
Iowa	Rushing	Kamari Moulton	14 carries, 95 yards, TD
Iowa	Receiving	DJ Vonnahme	7 receptions, 146 yards, TD
Vanderbilt	Passing	Diego Pavia	25–38, 347 yards, 2 TD
Vanderbilt	Rushing	Diego Pavia	15 carries, 36 yards, TD
Vanderbilt	Receiving	Tre Richardson	6 receptions, 127 yards, TD
