= Brian Murphy =

Brian Murphy may refer to:

== Sportspeople ==
- Brian Murphy (Jamaican cricketer) (born 1973), Jamaican cricketer
- Brian Murphy (Zimbabwean cricketer) (born 1976), Zimbabwean cricketer
- Brian Murphy (baseball) (born 1980), American head baseball coach at the College of William & Mary
- Brian Murphy (Gaelic games) (born 1952), Irish former hurler and Gaelic footballer for Cork
- Brian Murphy (1990s Gaelic footballer), Irish former inter-county goalkeeper for Kerry and Dublin
- Brian Murphy (1960s Gaelic footballer) (born 1943), Irish former corner-back on the Cork senior football team
- Brian Murphy (Clonakilty Gaelic footballer) (born 1973), Irish Gaelic footballer
- Brian Murphy (hurler, born 1982) (born 1982), Irish former corner-back on the Cork senior hurling team
- Brian Murphy (ice hockey) (born 1947), played in one NHL game
- Brian Murphy (linesman), National Hockey League linesman, see 49th National Hockey League All-Star Game
- Brian Murphy (rugby union) (born 1985), Irish rugby player
- Brian Murphy (footballer, born 1983), Irish retired soccer player who was League of Ireland Goalkeeper of the Year 2008

== Others ==
- Brian Murphy (actor) (1932–2025), British actor most noted for his role as George Roper in the sitcom George and Mildred
- Brian Murphy (musician), Irish multi-instrumentalist and engineer
- Brian Murphy (politician) (born 1961), former mayor of Moncton in New Brunswick, Canada
- Brian Murphy (scholar) (1923–2017), Irish scholar of Russian literature
- Brian Murphy (writer) (born 1959), American religion editor for the Associated Press
- Brian K. Murphy (born 1985), American actor, producer, and writer
- Brian Murphy (1981–2000), Irish student killed unlawfully outside Club Anabel in Dublin (see Death of Brian Murphy)
- Brian Murphy (intelligence official), U.S. federal agent who served as Under Secretary of Homeland Security for Intelligence and Analysis
- Brian R. Murphy (born 1942), American virologist
- Brian E. Murphy (born 1979), U.S. district judge appointed by president Joe Biden
- Brian Murphy (detective) (1933–2023), Australian police detective
- Brian Murphy (businessman), founder of American cybersecurity company ReliaQuest

== See also ==
- Bryan Murphy (disambiguation)
