= 2026 Iowa Hawkeyes football team =

American college football season

2026 Iowa Hawkeyes football
- Conference: Big Ten Conference

Ranking
- Coaches: No. 13
- AP: No. 13
- CFP: No. 15
- Record: 9–2 (6–2 Big Ten)
- Head coach: Kirk Ferentz (28th season)
- Offensive coordinator: Tim Lester (3rd season)
- Offensive scheme: West Coast
- Defensive coordinator: Phil Parker (15th season)
- Base defense: 4–2–5
- Home stadium: Kinnick Stadium

2026 Big Ten Conference football standings
	Conf.			Overall
Team	W		L	W		L
No. 4 UCLA	7	–	1	10	–	1
No. 8 Indiana	6	–	2	9	–	2
No. 15 Iowa	6	–	2	9	–	2
No. 13 Oregon	6	–	2	8	–	3
No. 18 USC	5	–	3	8	–	3
No. 14 Ohio State	5	–	3	7	–	4
Wisconsin	5	–	3	7	–	4
Nebraska	4	–	4	7	–	4
Washington	4	–	4	7	–	4
Illinois	4	–	4	6	–	5
Minnesota	4	–	4	6	–	5
Michigan	3	–	5	6	–	5
Northwestern	3	–	5	6	–	5
Penn State	3	–	5	6	–	5
Maryland	2	–	6	4	–	7
Purdue	2	–	6	3	–	8
Rutgers	2	–	6	3	–	8
Michigan State	1	–	7	3	–	8
Championship: December 5, 2026
^ – College Football Playoff participant; $ – Conference champion; y – Championship game participant; As of November 22, 2026; Rankings from CFP rankings

The 2026 Iowa Hawkeyes football team represents the University of Iowa as a member of the Big Ten Conference during the 2026 NCAA Division I FBS football season. The Hawkeyes are led by Kirk Ferentz who is in his 28th year as head coach. Iowa plays their home games at Kinnick Stadium located in Iowa City, Iowa.

Their Week 5 home loss to Ohio State marked the end of a 66-game streak going back to 2016 in which Iowa prevented their opponents from scoring 30 points or more at Kinnick Stadium.

== Offseason ==
=== 2026 NFL draft ===
Round	Pick	Player	Position	NFL Club
2	57	Logan Jones	C	Chicago Bears
3	96	Gennings Dunker	T	Pittsburgh Steelers
4	121	Kaden Wetjen	WR	Pittsburgh Steelers
5	148	Beau Stephens	OG	Seattle Seahawks
6	183	Karson Sharar	LB	Arizona Cardinals
7	219	TJ Hall	CB	New Orleans Saints
7	238	Max Llewellyn	DE	Miami Dolphins

=== Transfers ===
==== Outgoing ====
Player	Position	Destination
Brian Allen	DL	Vanderbilt
CJ Bell	CB	UConn
Rhys Dakin	P	Michigan State
Koen Entringer	DB	Louisville
Kael Kolarik	S	South Dakota
Jaziun Patterson	RB	Michigan State
Jackson Stratton	QB	San Diego
Terrell Washington Jr.	RB	New Mexico State

==== Incoming ====
Player	Position	Previous school
Lance Beeghley	WR	Southern Methodist
Kahmari Brown	EDGE	Elon
Tyler Brown	S	James Madison
Tony Diaz	WR	UT Rio Grande Valley
Boston Everitt	P	Melbourne
Lance Ingold	EDGE	Northern Illinois
Cody Haddad	DB	Ohio State
Anthony Hawkins	S	Villanova
Evan James	WR	Furman
Emmanuel Olagbaju	DL	North Dakota
Eli Ozick	K	North Dakota State
L. J. Phillips	RB	South Dakota
Tanner Philpott	P	Simpson
Brice Stevenson	DL	Holy Cross
Xavier Styles	S	Robert Morris
Trent Wilson	OL	James Madison

== Schedule ==
Date	Time	Opponent	Rank	Site	TV	Result	Attendance
September 5	3:15 p.m.	Northern Illinois*	No. 22	Kinnick Stadium; Iowa City, IA	BTN	W 40–0	69,250
September 12	6:30 p.m.	Iowa State*	No. 21	Kinnick Stadium; Iowa City, IA (Cy-Hawk Trophy)	NBC	W 16–13	69,250
September 19	3:00 p.m.	Northern Iowa*	No. 18	Kinnick Stadium; Iowa City, IA	FS1	W 55–0	69,250
September 26	2:30 p.m.	at No. 18 Michigan	No. 17	Michigan Stadium; Ann Arbor, MI	CBS	W 20–19	111,126
October 3	2:30 p.m.	No. 5 Ohio State	No. 14	Kinnick Stadium; Iowa City, IA (College GameDay)	CBS	L 14–31	69,250
October 9	8:00 p.m.	at Washington	No. 20	Husky Stadium; Seattle, WA	FOX	W 41–24	66,231
October 24	2:30 p.m.	at Minnesota	No. 15	Huntington Bank Stadium; Minneapolis, MN (Floyd of Rosedale)	FS1	L 10–13	53,004
October 31	11:00 a.m.	No. 25 Wisconsin^{†}		Kinnick Stadium; Iowa City, IA (Heartland Trophy, Big Noon Kickoff)	FOX	W 30–0	69,250
November 7	6:30 p.m.	at Northwestern	No. 19	Ryan Field; Evanston, IL	FOX	W 24–10	31,151
November 14	6:30 p.m.	Purdue	No. 15	Kinnick Stadium; Iowa City, IA	NBC	W 28–7	69,250
November 21	1:30 p.m.	at Illinois	No. 15	Gies Memorial Stadium; Champaign, IL (rivalry)	BTN	W 34–17	60,670
November 27	11:00 a.m.	Nebraska		Kinnick Stadium; Iowa City, IA (Heroes Game)	CBS		
*Non-conference game; ^{†}Homecoming; Rankings from AP Poll (and CFP Rankings, after November 3) – Released prior to game; All times are in Central time; Source:

== Rankings ==
Ranking movements Legend: ██ Increase in ranking ██ Decrease in ranking RV = Received votes
	Week															
Poll	Pre	1	2	3	4	5	6	7	8	9	10	11	12	13	14	Final
AP	22	21	18	17	14	20	17	15	RV	21	16	13	13			
Coaches	22	21	20	17	14	18	16	14	24	20	15	13	13			
CFP	Not released									19	15	15				Not released

== Game summaries ==
=== vs Northern Illinois ===
Over the years, Iowa has played some tightly contested games with the Huskies, but that wasn't the case in this one. The Hawkeyes, powered by 132 rushing yards and a pair of touchdowns from Kamari Moulton, jumped out to a three touchdown lead in the first quarter. In the second half, Evan James returned a punt 77 yards for a touchdown to put the game well out of reach. Moulton finished the day with a career-high 183 yards on the ground. Defensively, Iowa limited Northern Illinois to 120 yards (7 yards rushing) and has shut out at least one opponent in each of the last five seasons.

Northern Illinois Huskies (0–0) at No. 22 Iowa Hawkeyes (0–0) – Game summary

Quarter	1	2	3	4	Total
Huskies	0	0	0	0	0
No. 22 Hawkeyes	20	13	7	0	40

at Kinnick Stadium • Iowa City, Iowa

- Date: September 5
- Game time: 3:15 p.m. CST
- Game weather: 90 °F (32 °C), Cloudy, Wind NE 9 mph (14 km/h)
- Game attendance: 69,250
- Referee: Kole Knueppel
- TV announcers (BTN): Mark Followill, Rhett Lewis, and Caroline Hendershot
- Recap and Box score

Game information

First quarter

- 9:52 IOWA – Tony Diaz 6-yard pass from Hank Brown (Caden Buhr kick failed) (Drive: 10 plays, 75 yards, 5:08; Iowa 6–0)
- 6:46 IOWA – Kamari Moulton 50-yard run (Caden Buhr kick) (Drive: 2 plays, 66 yards, 0:42; Iowa 13–0)
- 4:10 IOWA – Kamari Moulton 37-yard run (Caden Buhr kick) (Drive: 4 plays, 70 yards, 1:48; Iowa 20–0)

Second quarter

- 7:40 IOWA – Xavier Williams 8-yard pass from Jeremy Hecklinski (Caden Buhr kick) (Drive: 6 plays, 46 yards, 3:20; Iowa 27–0)
- 3:34 IOWA – Caden Buhr 45-yard field goal (Drive: 6 plays, 31 yards, 2:10; Iowa 30–0)
- 0:02 IOWA – Caden Buhr 34-yard field goal (Drive: 14 plays, 41 yards, 2:17; Iowa 33–0)

Third quarter

- 2:20 IOWA - Evan James 77-yard punt return (Caden Buhr kick) Iowa 40–0

Fourth quarter

- No scoring plays.

Statistics	NIU	IOWA
First downs	7	26
Plays–yards	55–120	78–507
Rushes–yards	31–7	38–289
Passing yards	113	218
Passing: comp–att–int	13–24–1	21–40–1
Turnovers	2	1
Time of possession	26:09	33:51

Team	Category	Player	Statistics
Northern Illinois	Passing	Taron Dickens	9/14, 96 yards, INT
Northern Illinois	Rushing	Telly Johnson Jr.	8 carries, 16 yards
Northern Illinois	Receiving	Kelan McInerney	3 receptions, 55 yards
Iowa	Passing	Hank Brown	12/20, 129 yards, TD
Iowa	Rushing	Kamari Moulton	11 carries, 183 yards, 2 TD
Iowa	Receiving	Tony Diaz	7 receptions, 84 yards, TD

=== vs Iowa State (Cy–Hawk Trophy) ===
After dropping three of the last four in this in-state series, the Hawkeyes leaned heavily on defense and the kicking game to regain the Cy-Hawk Trophy. Caden Buhr kicked a 42-yard field goal with 15 seconds remaining to give Iowa its first lead of the game and secure the victory. This was the fifth consecutive matchup between the teams decided by a single possession. Buhr's three field goals were enough to earn Big Ten Special Teams Player of the Week honors.

Iowa State Cyclones (1–0) at No. 21 Iowa Hawkeyes (1–0) – Game summary

Quarter	1	2	3	4	Total
Cyclones	0	10	3	0	13
No. 21 Hawkeyes	0	10	0	6	16

at Kinnick Stadium • Iowa City, Iowa

- Date: September 12
- Game time: 6:36 p.m. CST
- Game weather: 77 °F (25 °C), Sunny, Wind NW 8 mph (13 km/h)
- Game attendance: 69,250
- Referee: Kevin Mar
- TV announcers (NBC): Paul Burmeister, Todd Blackledge, and Kathryn Tappen
- Recap and Box score

Game information

First quarter

- No scoring plays.

Second quarter

- 14:17 ISU – Kyle Konrardy 29-yard field goal (Drive: 9 plays, 34 yards, 4:34; ISU 3–0)
- 7:51 ISU – Vince Benetti 4-yard pass from Jaylen Raynor (Kyle Konrardy kick) (Drive: 10 plays, 66 yards, 5:34; ISU 10–0)
- 5:34 IOWA – Hank Brown 1-yard run (Caden Buhr kick) (Drive: 5 plays, 75 yards, 2:17; ISU 10–7)
- 0:28 IOWA – Caden Buhr 45-yard field goal (Drive: 10 plays, 46 yards, 3:29; Tied 10–10)

Third quarter

- 10:06 ISU – Kyle Konrardy 51-yard field goal (Drive: 8 plays, 41 yards, 4:54; ISU 13–10)

Fourth quarter

- 6:22 IOWA – Caden Buhr 32-yard field goal (Drive: 11 plays, 43 yards, 6:10; Tied 13–13)
- 0:15 IOWA – Caden Buhr 42-yard field goal (Drive: 9 plays, 31 yards, 4:13; Iowa 16–13)

Statistics	ISU	IOWA
First downs	9	13
Plays–yards	53–255	59–284
Rushes–yards	34–138	29–93
Passing yards	117	191
Passing: comp–att–int	10–19–0	21–30–0
Turnovers	0	0
Time of possession	30:18	29:42

Team	Category	Player	Statistics
Iowa State	Passing	Jaylen Raynor	10/19, 117 yards, TD
Iowa State	Rushing	Aiden Flora	19 carries, 89 yards
Iowa State	Receiving	Omari Hayes	3 receptions, 39 yards
Iowa	Passing	Hank Brown	21/30, 191 yards
Iowa	Rushing	Kamari Moulton	15 carries, 57 yards
Iowa	Receiving	Tony Diaz	8 receptions, 95 yards

=== vs Northern Iowa (FCS) ===
In the first meeting of the two Iowa schools since 2018 (the 2020 match-up was canceled due to the pandemic), the Hawkeyes were dominant on both sides of the ball. Iowa rushed for 422 yards and had three different backs run for over 100 yards. The defense forced two turnovers and posted its second shutout. Kirk Ferentz moved to 6–0 all-time against Northern Iowa.

Northern Iowa Panthers (FCS) (1–1) at No. 18 Iowa Hawkeyes (2–0) – Game summary

Quarter	1	2	3	4	Total
Panthers (FCS)	0	0	0	0	0
No. 18 Hawkeyes	21	21	7	6	55

at Kinnick Stadium • Iowa City, Iowa

- Date: September 19
- Game time: 3:00 p.m. CST
- Game weather: 76 °F (24 °C), Cloudy, Wind S 8 mph (13 km/h)
- Game attendance: 69,250
- Referee: Tim O'Dey
- TV announcers (FS1): Jack Kizer and Mark Helfrich
- Recap and Box score

Game information

First quarter

- 11:11 IOWA – Nathan McNeil 2-yard run (Caden Buhr kick) (Drive: 8 plays, 75 yards, 3:49; Iowa 7–0)
- 5:48 IOWA – Braeden Jackson 24-yard pass from Hank Brown (Caden Buhr kick) (Drive: 6 plays, 78 yards, 3:04; Iowa 14–0)
- 0:24 IOWA – Xavier Williams 48-yard run (Caden Buhr kick) (Drive: 4 plays, 90 yards, 2:01; Iowa 21–0)

Second quarter

- 12:59 IOWA – Addison Ostrenga 14-yard pass from Hank Brown (Caden Buhr kick) (Drive: 2 plays, 37 yards, 0:57; Iowa 28–0)
- 10:06 IOWA – Xavier Williams 16-yard run (Caden Buhr kick) (Drive: 3 plays, 58 yards, 1:05; Iowa 35–0)
- 0:46 IOWA – Nathan McNeil 12-yard run (Caden Buhr kick) (Drive: 8 plays, 90 yards, 1:34; Iowa 42–0)

Third quarter

- 7:03 IOWA – Xavier Williams 37-yard run (Caden Buhr kick) (Drive: 5 plays, 66 yards, 2:41; Iowa 49–0)

Fourth quarter

- 12:37 IOWA – Braeden Jackson 62-yard run (Caden Buhr PAT blocked) (Drive: 2 plays, 65 yards, 0:58; Iowa 55–0)

Statistics	UNI	IOWA
First downs	9	32
Plays–yards	58–155	64–640
Rushes–yards	25–53	41–422
Passing yards	102	218
Passing: comp–att–int	14–33–2	18–23–0
Turnovers	2	0
Time of possession	27:45	32:15

Team	Category	Player	Statistics
Northern Iowa	Passing	Jaxon Dailey	11/27, 91 yards, 2 INT
Northern Iowa	Rushing	Caleb Kamara	7 carries, 21 yards
Northern Iowa	Receiving	Ayden Price	2 receptions, 32 yards
Iowa	Passing	Hank Brown	12/12, 153 yards, 2 TD
Iowa	Rushing	Xavier Williams	6 carries, 151 yards, 3 TD
Iowa	Receiving	Nathan McNeil	3 receptions, 37 yards

=== at No. 18 Michigan ===
Two 16-yard TD passes in the 4th quarter from Hank Brown to Reece Vander Zee – the second as time expired – propelled Iowa to beat Michigan for the first time since 2016. The Hawkeyes won at Michigan Stadium for the third time in the Ferentz era (2002, 2010), and secured their first road win against a ranked Big Ten team since 2015. Braeden Jackson sparked Iowa with a 99-yard kickoff return for a touchdown that earned him Big Ten Freshman of the Week honors.

No. 17 Iowa Hawkeyes (3–0) at No. 18 Michigan Wolverines (3–0) – Game summary

Quarter	1	2	3	4	Total
No. 17 Hawkeyes	7	0	0	13	20
No. 18 Wolverines	7	3	3	6	19

at Michigan Stadium • Ann Arbor, Michigan

- Date: September 26
- Game time: 2:30 p.m. CDT
- Game weather: 70 °F (21 °C), sunny, NW 7 miles per hour (11 km/h)
- Game attendance: 111,126
- Referee: Chris Coyte
- TV announcers (CBS): Brad Nessler, Charles Davis, and Jenny Dell
- Recap and Box score

Game information

First quarter

- 1:58 MICH – JJ Buchanan 18-yard pass from Bryce Underwood (Trey Butkowski kick) (Drive: 9 plays, 89 yards, 3:58; Michigan 7–0)
- 1:44 IOWA – Braeden Jackson 99-yard kickoff return (Caden Buhr kick) (Tied 7–7)

Second quarter

- 12:58 MICH – Trey Butkowski 41-yard field goal (Drive: 8 plays, 59 yards, 3:43; Michigan 10–7)

Third quarter

- 1:29 MICH – Trey Butkowski 22-yard field goal (Drive: 11 plays, 43 yards, 5:44; Michigan 13–7)

Fourth quarter

- 14:02 IOWA – Reece Vander Zee 16-yard pass from Hank Brown (Caden Buhr kick) (Drive: 7 plays, 75 yards, 2:27; Iowa 14–13)
- 11:59 MICH – JJ Buchanan 49-yard pass from Bryce Underwood (Two-Point Pass Conversion Failed) (Drive: 6 plays, 75 yards, 2:03; Michigan 19–14)
- 0:00 IOWA – Reece Vander Zee 16-yard pass from Hank Brown (Drive: 11 plays, 91 yards, 1:46; Iowa 20–19)

Statistics	IOWA	MICH
First downs	16	21
Plays–yards	59–285	68–429
Rushes–yards	24–58	40–153
Passing yards	227	276
Passing: comp–att–int	21–35–0	17–28–1
Time of possession	25:31	34:29

Team	Category	Player	Statistics
Iowa	Passing	Hank Brown	21/35, 227 yards, 2 TD
Iowa	Rushing	Kamari Moulton	13 carries, 44 yards
Iowa	Receiving	Reece Vander Zee	5 receptions, 66 yards, 2 TD
Michigan	Passing	Bryce Underwood	17/28, 276 yards, 2 TD, INT
Michigan	Rushing	Jordan Marshall	11 carries, 59 yards
Michigan	Receiving	JJ Buchanan	5 receptions, 130 yards, 2 TD

=== vs No. 5 Ohio State ===
This top 15 matchup attracted College GameDay to the University of Iowa campus for the first time in over two decades. The Buckeyes, who last traveled to Iowa City in 2017, took the lead after an early Iowa turnover and never looked back. Ohio State seized full control of the game just before half and extended the lead to 25 early in the 4th. Iowa scored its only touchdown of the game midway through the 4th quarter.

No. 5 Ohio State Buckeyes (3–1) at No. 14 Iowa Hawkeyes (4–0) – Game summary

Quarter	1	2	3	4	Total
No. 5 Buckeyes	10	7	7	7	31
No. 14 Hawkeyes	6	0	0	8	14

at Kinnick Stadium • Iowa City, Iowa

- Date: October 3
- Game time: 2:30 p.m. CDT
- Game weather: 69 °F (21 °C), Sunny, Wind NW 9 mph (14 km/h)
- Game attendance: 69,250
- Referee: Mark Kluczynski
- TV announcers (CBS): Brad Nessler, Charles Davis, and Jenny Dell
- Recap and Box score

Game information

First quarter

- 13:18 OSU – Devin McCuin 15-yard pass from Julian Sayin (Connor Hawkins kick) (Drive: 2 plays, 14 yards, 0:55; Ohio State 7–0)
- 10:01 IOWA – Caden Buhr 43-yard field goal (Drive: 11 plays, 50 yards, 3:17; Ohio State 7–3)
- 4:17 OSU – Connor Hawkins 28-yard field goal (Drive: 10 plays, 50 yards, 5:44; Ohio State 10–3)
- 0:00 IOWA – Caden Buhr 48-yard field goal (Drive: 10 plays, 40 yards, 4:17; Ohio State 10–6)

Second quarter

- 0:12 OSU – Jeremiah Smith 12-yard pass from Julian Sayin (Connor Hawkins kick) (Drive: 9 plays, 84 yards, 1:36; Ohio State 17–6)

Third quarter

- 6:11 OSU – Jeremiah Smith 57-yard pass from Julian Sayin (Connor Hawkins kick) (Drive: 5 plays, 75 yards, 2:46; Ohio State 24–6)

Fourth quarter

- 12:47 OSU – Ja'Kobi Jackson 7-yard run (Connor Hawkins kick) (Drive: 10 plays, 70 yards, 5:05; Ohio State 31–6)
- 9:30 IOWA – Braeden Jackson 2-yard run (Reece Vander Zee pass from Jeremy Hecklinski) (Drive: 8 plays, 75 yards, 3:17; Ohio State 31–14)

Statistics	OSU	IOWA
First downs	25	15
Plays–yards	74–484	53–238
Rushes–yards	47–160	21–39
Passing yards	324	199
Passing: comp–att–int	20–27–0	17–32–1
Time of possession	38:02	21:58

Team	Category	Player	Statistics
Ohio State	Passing	Julian Sayin	20/27, 324 yards, 3 TD
Ohio State	Rushing	Ja'Kobi Jackson	14 carries, 72 yards, TD
Ohio State	Receiving	Jeremiah Smith	11 receptions, 206 yards, 2 TD
Iowa	Passing	Hank Brown	12/27, 132 yards, INT
Iowa	Rushing	Kamari Moulton	11 carries, 27 yards
Iowa	Receiving	DJ Vonnahme	6 receptions, 64 yards

=== at Washington ===
In the Hawkeyes' first visit to Seattle since 1963, they earned a regular season victory in the Pacific Time Zone for the first time since 1965. The Iowa ground game was effective early and often as Kamari Moulton ran for a career high 208 yards. Jeremy Hecklinski won his first start as Iowa QB, throwing for 202 yards and three touchdowns. The defense made the Huskies one dimensional, holding Washington to –3 yards rushing.

No. 20 Iowa Hawkeyes (4–1) at Washington Huskies (3–2) – Game summary

Quarter	1	2	3	4	Total
No. 20 Hawkeyes	13	14	7	7	41
Huskies	0	3	15	6	24

at Husky Stadium • Seattle, Washington

- Date: October 9
- Game time: 8:00 p.m. CST
- Game weather: 57 °F (14 °C), Cloudy, Wind E 8 mph (13 km/h)
- Game attendance: 66,231
- Referee: Jim Wharrie
- TV announcers (FOX): Connor Onion, Robert Griffin III, and Alexa Landestoy
- Recap and Box score

Game information

First quarter

- 12:30 IOWA – Caden Buhr 51-yard field goal (Drive: 7 plays, 32 yards, 2:30; Iowa 3–0)
- 7:07 IOWA – Caden Buhr 27-yard field goal (Drive: 8 plays, 56 yards, 3:18; Iowa 6–0)
- 0:10 IOWA – Kamari Moulton 56-yard run (Caden Buhr kick) (Drive: 1 play, 56 yards, 0:14; Iowa 13–0)

Second quarter

- 9:05 IOWA – DJ Vonnahme 20-yard pass from Jeremy Hecklinski (Caden Buhr kick) (Drive: 8 plays, 69 yards, 4:29; Iowa 20–0)
- 5:07 IOWA – DJ Vonnahme 24-yard pass from Jeremy Hecklinski (Caden Buhr kick) (Drive: 5 plays, 69 yards, 2:00; Iowa 27–0)
- 1:56 WASH – Tyler Robles 30-yard field goal (Drive: 12 plays, 63 yards, 3:11; Iowa 27–3)

Third quarter

- 11:10 WASH – Chris Lawson 10-yard pass from Elijah Brown (Tyler Robles) (Drive: 8 plays, 75 yards, 3:50; Iowa 27–10)
- 7:05 IOWA – Reece Vander Zee 16-yard pass from Jeremy Hecklinski (Caden Buhr kick) (Drive: 8 plays, 83 yards, 3:59; Iowa 34–10)
- 1:25 WASH – Dezmen Roebuck 2-yard pass from Elijah Brown (Chris Lawson pass from Elijah Brown) (Drive: 11 plays, 75 yards, 5:40; Iowa 34–18)

Fourth quarter

- 12:06 IOWA – Kamari Moulton 3-yard run (Caden Buhr kick) (Drive: 8 plays, 75 yards, 4:19; Iowa 41–18)
- 0:00 WASH – Mason James 3-yard pass from Elijah Brown (Drive: 12 plays, 84 yards, 3:15; Iowa 41–24)

Statistics	IOWA	WASH
First downs	22	24
Plays–yards	57–465	76–317
Rushes–yards	38–263	25–(–3)
Passing yards	202	320
Passing: comp–att–int	14–19–0	34–51–0
Time of possession	28:19	31:41

Team	Category	Player	Statistics
Iowa	Passing	Jeremy Hecklinski	14/19, 202 yards, 3 TD
Iowa	Rushing	Kamari Moulton	26 carries, 208 yards, 2 TD
Iowa	Receiving	Reece Vander Zee	3 receptions, 69 yards, TD
Washington	Passing	Elijah Brown	28/39, 251 yards, 3 TD
Washington	Rushing	Brian Bonner Jr.	10 carries, 17 yards
Washington	Receiving	Chris Lawson	8 receptions, 86 yards, TD

=== at Minnesota (Floyd of Rosedale) ===
Iowa had won five consecutive games at Huntington Bank Stadium, but ominous signs in the first quarter turned into an uncharacteristically sloppy game for the Hawkeyes. A blocked punt after Iowa's first offensive possession gave the Gophers an early 3–0 lead. On Iowa's next possession, a red zone interception likely took points off the board. Rather than being anomalies, those gaffes were a sign of things to come as Iowa turned the ball over three more times. The defense, solid as usual, was plagued by a costly offside penalty that led to a touchdown and a blown coverage that led to Minnesota's game-winning field goal.

No. 15 Iowa Hawkeyes (5–1) at Minnesota Golden Gophers (4–2) – Game summary

Quarter	1	2	3	4	Total
No. 15 Hawkeyes	0	3	0	7	10
Golden Gophers	3	0	7	3	13

at Huntington Bank Stadium • Minneapolis, Minnesota

- Date: October 24
- Game time: 2:30 p.m. CDT
- Game weather: 74 °F (23 °C), Cloudy, Wind NE 9 mph (14 km/h)
- Game attendance: 53,004
- Referee: Kole Knueppel
- TV announcers (FS1): Tim Brando, Devin Gardner, and Josh Sims
- Recap and Box score

Game information

First quarter

- 12:14 MINN – Luke Drzewiecki 31-yard field goal (Drive: 4 plays, 1 yard, 1:27; Minnesota 3–0)

Second quarter

- 6:49 IOWA – Caden Buhr 32-field goal (Drive: 4 plays, –3 yards, 1:41; Tied 3–3)

Third quarter

- 8:08 MINN – Darius Taylor 1-yard run (Luke Drzewiecki kick) (Drive: 10 plays, 71 yards, 6:46; Minnesota 10–3)

Fourth quarter

- 3:46 IOWA – Reece Vander Zee 37-yard pass from Hank Brown (Caden Buhr kick) (Drive: 4 plays, 98 yards, 1:58; Tied 10–10)
- 0:00 MINN – Luke Drzewiecki 46-yard field goal (Drive: 7 plays, 44 yards, 1:46; Minnesota 13–10)

Statistics	IOWA	MINN
First downs	16	11
Plays–yards	67–288	62–209
Rushes–yards	30–90	35–72
Passing yards	198	137
Passing: comp–att–int	20–37–3	14–27–1
Time of possession	31:07	28:53

Team	Category	Player	Statistics
Iowa	Passing	Hank Brown	11/21, 136 yards, TD, 2 INT
Iowa	Rushing	L. J. Phillips Jr.	7 carries, 25 yards
Iowa	Receiving	Reece Vander Zee	4 receptions, 69 yards, TD
Minnesota	Passing	Drake Lindsey	14/26, 137 yards, INT
Minnesota	Rushing	Xavier Ford	8 carries, 33 yards
Minnesota	Receiving	Javon Tracy	7 receptions, 45 yards

=== vs No. 25 Wisconsin (Heartland Trophy) ===
Fox Big Noon Kickoff was on hand, featuring honorary caption and former Hawkeye George Kittle, for this Big Ten showdown on homecoming in Iowa City. In the 100th meeting in the series, Iowa evened the rivalry at 49–49–2 by dominating the Badgers for the third straight time (109–10 combined margin). The Hawkeyes secured their fifth consecutive victory over Wisconsin for the first time in three decades and the defense posted its third shutout of the season. Quarterback Hank Brown completed 20 of 24 attempts for 222 yards and 2 touchdowns to earn Big Ten Offensive Player of the Week honors.

No. 25 Wisconsin Badgers (5–2) at Iowa Hawkeyes (5–2) – Game summary

Quarter	1	2	3	4	Total
No. 25 Badgers	0	0	0	0	0
Hawkeyes	10	10	10	0	30

at Kinnick Stadium • Iowa City, Iowa

- Date: October 31
- Game time: 11:00 a.m. CDT
- Game weather: 78 °F (26 °C), Sunny, Wind E 8 mph (13 km/h)
- Game attendance: 69,250
- Referee: Jeff Servinski
- TV announcers (FOX): Gus Johnson, Joel Klatt, and Jenny Taft
- Recap and Box score

Game information

First quarter

- 9:08 IOWA – Caden Buhr 24-yard field goal (Drive: 10 plays, 67 yards, 5:48; Iowa 3–0)
- 1:02 IOWA – DJ Vonnahme 4-yard pass from Hank Brown (Caden Buhr kick) (Drive: 12 plays, 75 yards, 6:07; Iowa 10–0)

Second quarter

- 1:30 IOWA – Tony Diaz 4-yard pass from Hank Brown (Caden Buhr kick) (Drive: 7 plays, 98 yards, 2:52; Iowa 17–0)
- 0:00 IOWA – Caden Buhr 28-yard field goal (Drive: 4 plays, 7 yards, 0:45; Iowa 20–0)

Third quarter

- 7:54 IOWA – DJ Vonnahme 2-yard run (Caden Buhr kick) (Drive: 10 plays, 71 yards, 5:28; Iowa 27–0)
- 2:16 IOWA – Caden Buhr 54-yard field goal (Drive: 7 plays, 24 yards, 4:03; Iowa 30–0)

Fourth quarter

Statistics	WIS	IOWA
First downs	9	20
Plays–yards	51–235	66–362
Rushes–yards	24–52	42–140
Passing yards	183	222
Passing: comp–att–int	13–27–1	20–24
Time of possession	23:39	36:21

Team	Category	Player	Statistics
Wisconsin	Passing	Ryan Hopkins	8/13, 93 yards, INT
Wisconsin	Rushing	Abu Sama III	6 carries, 23 yards
Wisconsin	Receiving	Jaylon Domingeaux	6 receptions, 86 yards
Iowa	Passing	Hank Brown	20/24, 222 yards, 2 TD
Iowa	Rushing	Xavier Williams	20 carries, 78 yards
Iowa	Receiving	Tony Diaz	4 receptions, 75 yards, TD

=== at Northwestern ===
Iowa won its fifth straight over the Wildcats, its longest streak in the series since a 21-game win streak from 1974 to 1994. The Hawkeyes became the first road team to win at the new Ryan Field.

No. 19 Iowa Hawkeyes (6–2) at Northwestern Wildcats (6–2) – Game summary

Quarter	1	2	3	4	Total
No. 19 Hawkeyes	7	7	10	0	24
Wildcats	0	0	3	7	10

at Ryan Field • Evanston, Illinois

- Date: November 7
- Game time: 6:30 p.m. CST
- Game weather: 49 °F (9 °C), Cloudy
- Game attendance: 31,151
- Referee: Jason Nickleby
- TV announcers (FOX): Connor Onion, Robert Griffin III, and Alexa Landestoy
- Recap and Box score

Game information

First quarter

- 11:10 IOWA – Hank Brown 21-yard run (Caden Buhr kick) (Drive: 7 plays, 75 yards, 3:50; Iowa 7–0)

Second quarter

- 13:25 IOWA – Tony Diaz 24-yard pass from Hank Brown (Caden Buhr kick) (Drive: 7 plays, 97 yards, 4:10; Iowa 14–0)

Third quarter

- 4:14 NW – Jackson Kleather 45-yard field goal (Drive: 8 plays, 33 yards, 4:03; Iowa 14–3)
- 4:03 IOWA – Braeden Jackson 96-yard kickoff return (Caden Buhr kick) (Drive: 0 plays, 0 yards, 0:11; Iowa 21–3)

Fourth quarter

- 1:08 IOWA – Caden Buhr 24-yard field goal (Drive: 10 plays, 67 yards, 5:48; Iowa 24–3)

Fourth quarter

- 1:51 NW – Joseph Himon II 2-yard pass from Nicco Marchiol (Jackson Kleather kick) (Drive: 8 plays, 51 yards, 2:17; Iowa 24–10)

Statistics	IOWA	NU
First downs	14	19
Plays–yards	54–296	69–286
Rushes–yards	33–170	37–105
Passing yards	126	181
Passing: comp–att–int	16–21–1	24–32–0
Time of possession	28:13	31:47

Team	Category	Player	Statistics
Iowa	Passing	Hank Brown	16/21, 126 yards, TD, INT
Iowa	Rushing	L. J. Phillips Jr.	21 carries, 128 yards
Iowa	Receiving	Tony Diaz	2 receptions, 43 yards, TD
Northwestern	Passing	Nicco Marchiol	24/32, 181 yards, TD
Northwestern	Rushing	Nicco Marchiol	23 carries, 52 yards
Northwestern	Receiving	Griffin Wilde, Luke Dehnicke	5 receptions, 52 yards

=== vs Purdue ===
The Hawkeyes controlled the game throughout, led by a balanced offensive attack (246 yards rushing, 188 passing) and another stout defensive performance. Special teams struggled, as Iowa missed all three of their field goal attempts. With the win, the Hawkeyes are 25–5 in their last 30 games played in November.

Purdue Boilermakers (3–6) at No. 15 Iowa Hawkeyes (7–2) – Game summary

Quarter	1	2	3	4	Total
Boilermakers	0	7	0	0	7
No. 15 Hawkeyes	7	14	7	0	28

at Kinnick Stadium • Iowa City, Iowa

- Date: November 14
- Game time: 6:30 p.m. CST
- Game weather: 38 °F (3 °C), Clear, Wind 0 mph (0 km/h)
- Game attendance: 69,250
- Referee: Tim Odey
- TV announcers (NBC): Noah Eagle, Todd Blackledge, and Kathryn Tappen
- Recap and Box score

Game information

First quarter

- 3:19 IOWA – Hank Brown 1-yard run (Caden Buhr kick) (Drive: 15 plays, 80 yards, 6:57; Iowa 7–0)

Second quarter

- 6:35 IOWA – Tony Diaz 14-yard run (Caden Buhr kick) (Drive: 8 plays, 66 yards, 4:20; Iowa 14–0)
- 1:49 PURDUE – George Burhenn 3-yard pass from Ryan Browne (Jacobo Echeverria Lozano kick) (Drive: 11 plays, 75 yards, 4:46; Iowa 14–7)
- 0:05 IOWA – Braeden Jackson 44-yard pass from Hank Brown (Caden Buhr kick) (Drive: 11 plays, 83 yards, 1:37; Iowa 21–7)

Third quarter

- 11:07 IOWA – Xavier Williams 48-yard run (Caden Buhr kick) (Drive: 7 plays, 75 yards, 3:53; Iowa 28–7)

Fourth quarter

- No scoring plays.

Statistics	PUR	IOWA
First downs	16	27
Plays–yards	56–303	73–434
Rushes–yards	28–99	44–246
Passing yards	204	188
Passing: comp–att–int	17–28–1	20–29–0
Time of possession	24:46	35:14

Team	Category	Player	Statistics
Purdue	Passing	Ryan Browne	14/23, 158 yards, TD, INT
Purdue	Rushing	Fame Ijeboi	15 carries, 64 yards
Purdue	Receiving	Asaad Waseem	6 receptions, 93 yards
Iowa	Passing	Hank Brown	20/29, 188 yards, TD
Iowa	Rushing	L. J. Phillips Jr.	23 carries, 123 yards
Iowa	Receiving	Braeden Jackson	4 receptions, 61 yards, TD

=== at Illinois ===
After trading scores throughout the first half left the teams tied at 17, the Hawkeyes pulled away by blanking the Illini in the second half. Leading 20–17 late in the 3rd quarter, Iowa went on a 19-play, 91-yard drive that took 10 minutes off the clock and was paid off by a 2-yard run by QB Hank Brown. Jaylen Watson's pick six capped the scoring and extended Iowa's streak of seasons with an interception return for a touchdown to 19. In the 80th all-time meeting between the programs, the series is now tied 39–39–2.

No. 15 Iowa Hawkeyes (8–2) at Illinois Fighting Illini (6–4) – Game summary

Quarter	1	2	3	4	Total
No. 15 Hawkeyes	3	14	3	14	34
Fighting Illini	3	14	0	0	17

at Gies Memorial Stadium • Champaign, Illinois

- Date: November 21
- Game time: 1:30 p.m. CST
- Game weather: 71 °F (22 °C), Sunny, Wind S 12 mph (19 km/h)
- Game attendance: 60,670
- Referee: Jim Wharrie
- TV announcers (BTN): Jeff Levering, Jake Butt, and Brooke Fletcher
- Recap and Box score

Game information

First quarter

- 10:49 IOWA – Caden Buhr 45-yard field goal (Drive: 11 plays, 48 yards, 4:11; Iowa 3–0)

Second quarter

- 0:52 ILL – Ethan Moczulski 39-yard field goal (Drive: 8 plays, 67 yards, 3:13; Tied 3–3)

Second quarter

- 12:08 IOWA – L. J. Phillips Jr. 2-yard run (Caden Buhr kick) (Drive: 9 plays, 75 yards, 3:44; Iowa 10–3)
- 11:54 ILL – Brayden Trimble 75-yard pass from Katin Houser (Ethan Moczulski kick) (Drive: 1 play, 75 yards, 0:14; Tied 10–10)
- 1:55 IOWA – Xavier Williams Jr. 2-yard run (Caden Buhr kick) (Drive: 11 plays, 49 yards, 5:27; Iowa 17–10)
- 0:07 ILL – Davin Stoffel 11-yard pass from Katin Houser (Ethan Moczulski kick) (Drive: 8 plays, 75 yards, 1:48; Tied 17–17)

Third quarter

- 7:05 IOWA – Caden Buhr 33-yard field goal (Drive: 8 plays, 38 yards, 3:38; Iowa 20–17)

Fourth quarter

- 7:25 IOWA – Hank Brown 2-yard run (Caden Buhr kick) (Drive: 19 plays, 91 yards, 10:05; Iowa 27–17)
- 2:56 IOWA – Jaylen Watson 40-yard interception return (Caden Buhr kick) (Iowa 34–17)

Statistics	IOWA	ILL
First downs	25	16
Plays–yards	78–401	56–346
Rushes–yards	52–263	17–28
Passing yards	138	318
Passing: comp–att–int	13–26–0	21–39–2
Time of possession	37:16	22:44

Team	Category	Player	Statistics
Iowa	Passing	Hank Brown	13/26, 138 yards
Iowa	Rushing	L. J. Phillips Jr.	26 carries, 154 yards, TD
Iowa	Receiving	Tony Diaz	4 receptions, 52 yards
Illinois	Passing	Katin Houser	21/39, 318 yards, 2 TD, 2 INT
Illinois	Rushing	Aidan Laughery	10 carries, 27 yards
Illinois	Receiving	Collin Dixon	8 receptions, 142 yards

=== vs Nebraska ===
The Hawkeyes have won 10 of the last 11 in this trophy series. Nebraska will be looking to avenge a humbling loss from the previous season.

Nebraska Cornhuskers (7–4) at Iowa Hawkeyes (9–2) – Game summary

Quarter	1	2	Total
Cornhuskers			0
Hawkeyes			0

at Kinnick Stadium • Iowa City, Iowa

- Date: November 27
- Game time: 11:00 a.m. CST
- TV announcers (CBS): Rich Waltz, Adam Breneman, Brian Kelly, and Jordan Giorgio

Statistics	NEB	IOWA
First downs		
Plays–yards		
Rushes–yards		
Passing yards		
Passing: comp–att–int		
Time of possession		

Team	Category	Player	Statistics
Nebraska	Passing		
Nebraska	Rushing		
Nebraska	Receiving		
Iowa	Passing		
Iowa	Rushing		
Iowa	Receiving		

== Roster ==
2026 Iowa Hawkeyes football team roster
Players
Coaches
Offense

Pos.	#	Name	Class
WR	0	Jarriett Buie	Jr
WR	1	K. J. Parker	So
WR	2	Reece Vander Zee	Jr
QB	3	Jimmy Sullivan	Fr
QB	4	Tradon Bessinger	Fr
RB	5	Nathan McNeil	So
WR	6	Xavier Stinson	Fr
WR	7	Dayton Howard	Jr
WR	8	Evan James	So
QB	9	Hank Brown	Jr
QB	10	Jeremy Hecklinski	So
WR	11	Brody Schaffer	Fr
WR	12	Diondre Smith	Fr
RB	13	Brevin Doll	So
WR	14	Tony Diaz	So
RB	15	O'Lontae Dean	Fr
QB	16	Ryan Fitzgerald	Fr
WR	17	Alex Eichmann	Sr
TE	18	Luke Brewer	Fr
TE	19	Mason Woods	Fr
RB	21	L. J. Phillips	Jr
RB	22	Braeden Jackson	Fr
RB	26	Xavier Williams	So
RB	28	Kamari Moulton	Jr
TE	48	Zach Ortwerth	Sr
OL	52	Will Hahn	Fr
OL	53	Michael Myslinski	GS
OL	58	Kade Pieper	Jr
OL	59	Trevor Lauck	Jr
OL	60	Lucas Allgeyer	Fr
OL	61	Cael Winter	Jr
OL	63	Josh Janowski	So
OL	64	Leighton Jones	Jr
OL	65	Trent Wilson	So
OL	68	Will Nolan	So
OL	70	Hudson Parliament	Fr
OL	71	Jack Dotzler	Sr
OL	72	Owen Linder	Fr
OL	74	Bodey McCaslin	So
OL	75	Cannon Leonard	Jr
OL	77	George Nahas	Jr
OL	78	Gene Riordan	Fr
OL	79	Carson Nielsen	Fr
TE	80	Michael Burt	So
TE	81	DJ Vonnahme	So
WR	82	Dylan Stecker	Fr
WR	83	Jackson Naeve	So
WR	84	Apollo Payne	Fr
TE	85	Thomas Meyer	Fr
TE	86	Eli Johnson	Fr
TE	87	Addison Ostrenga	Sr
WR	88	Lance Beeghley	So
WR	89	Isaiah Oliver	Fr

Defense

Pos.	#	Name	Class
DB	0	Cody Haddad	Fr
DB	1	Darion Jones	Fr
DB	2	Tyler Brown	Jr
DB	3	Jaylen Watson	Jr
LB	4	Julian Manson	Fr
DB	5	Anthony Hawkins	So
DB	6	Zach Lutmer	Jr
DB	7	Rashad Godfrey Jr.	So
DB	8	Deshaun Lee	Sr
LB	9	Kasen Thomas	Fr
LB	10	Burke Gautcher	Fr
DB	11	Jacob Wallace	Fr
LB	12	Billy Weivoda	Fr
DE	13	Drew Campbell	So
DB	14	Alex Mota	Jr
LB	15	Carson Cooney	Fr
DB	16	Ronnie Hall	Fr
DB	18	Xavier Styles	So
DB	19	Kyler Gerardy	So
DB	20	Ty Hudkins	Jr
DB	21	Marcello Vitti	Fr
LB	22	Derek Weisskopf	So
LB	23	Landyn Van Kekerix	Sr
DB	26	Eli Robbins	Fr
DB	29	Noah Daniel	Fr
DB	30	Eli Kampman	Fr
LB	31	Nolan DeLong	Jr
DL	32	Sawyer Jezierski	Fr
LB	33	Cam Buffington	So
DB	34	Drew MacPherson	Fr
LB	36	Jayden Montgomery	Sr
LB	37	Brayton Alford	Fr
DE	40	Chima Chineke	So
DL	42	David Fason	Fr
DL	43	Kahmari Brown	Jr
DL	44	Kenneth Merrieweather	Jr
DL	45	Jack Janda	Fr
LB	46	Preston Ries	So
LB	47	Jack Laughlin	Jr
DL	50	Will Lockhart	Fr
DL	51	Luke Gaffney	Sr
DL	56	Maddux Borcherding-Johnson	Jr
DL	57	Will Hubert	Sr
DE	84	Joseph Anderson	So
DL	88	Emmanuel Olagbaju	Jr
DL	91	Devan Kennedy	So
DL	92	Brice Stevenson	Sr
DL	95	Lance Ingold	So
DL	96	Bryce Hawthorne	Jr
DL	97	Iose Epenesa	Fr
DL	99	Brad Fitzgibbon	Fr

Special teams

Pos.	#	Name	Class
K	25	Eli Ozick	Jr
P	35	Tanner Philpott	Jr
P	49	Boston Everitt	Fr
LS	54	Matty McLaughlin	Fr
LS	69	Ike Speltz	So
K	92	Caden Buhr	Fr

Head coach

- Kirk Ferentz

Coordinators/assistant coaches

- Seth Wallace – Assistant head coach/Assistant defensive coordinator/linebackers
- Tim Lester – Offensive coordinator
- Phil Parker – Defensive coordinator/secondary
- Chris Polizzi – Special teams coordinator
- George Barnett Offensive line
- Kelvin Bell – Defensive line
- Abdul Hodge – Tight ends/fullbacks
- Jon Budmayr – Wide receivers
- Jay Norvell – Running backs
- Jay Niemann – Assistant defensive line/defensive recruiting coordinator
- Billy Vandemerkt – Quarterbacks
- Tom Moore – Senior Consultant to the Head Coach/Offensive Advisor
- Jason Manson - Senior Analyst/Assistant quarterbacks
- Shane Viilo - Senior Analyst/Assistant Linebackers
- Tyler Parker - Senior Analyst/Assistant Secondary
- Brock Sherman - Senior Analyst/Assistant Special Teams Coordinator
- Kevin Spencer - Senior Consultant to the Special Teams Coordinator
- Mike Grant - Senior Analyst/Assistant Tight Ends
- Tanner Krueger - Analyst Director/Tight Ends
- Mac McLeran - Analyst/Linebackers
- Brian Smith - Analyst/Secondary
- Jack Plumb - Analyst/Offensive Line
- Kyle Hazell - Analyst/Wide Receivers
- Stetson McIlravy - Analyst/Special Teams
- Tevyn Montgomery - Student Assistant/Running Backs
- Raimond Braithwaite – Director, Football Sports Performance
- Cody Myers – Associate Director, Football Sports Performance
- Drew Heitland – Assistant Director, Football Sports Performance
- Kohle Helle – Assistant Director, Football Sports Performance
- Allan Reyes – Assistant Director, Football Sports Performance
- Cedric Nah – Football Sports Performance Data Specialist

Legend

- (C) Team captain
- (S) Suspended
- (I) Ineligible
- Injured
- Redshirt

Roster
Last update: 10/16/2026
