= Chris Lawson =

Chris Lawson may refer to:

- Chris Lawson (writer)
- Chris Lawson (racing driver)
- Chris Lawson (American football)
