= 2026 NCAA Division I FBS football rankings =

- Season: 2026
- Preseason No. 1: Ohio State

Two human polls and a committee's selections comprise the 2026 National Collegiate Athletic Association (NCAA) Division I Football Bowl Subdivision (FBS) football rankings, in addition to various publications' preseason polls. Unlike most sports, college football's governing body, the NCAA, does not bestow a national championship at the FBS level. Instead, that title is bestowed by one or more different polling agencies. There are two main weekly polls that begin in the preseason—the AP poll and the Coaches Poll. One additional poll, the College Football Playoff (CFP) ranking, is usually released starting midway through the season. The CFP rankings determine who makes the twelve-team playoff that determines the College Football Playoff National Champion.

== Legend ==
	Increase in ranking
	Decrease in ranking
	Not ranked previous week
	Selected for College Football Playoff
(#–#)	Win–loss record
(Italics)	Number of first place votes

== AP poll ==
	Preseason Aug 17	Week 1 Sept 8	Week 2 Sept 13	Week 3 Sept 20	Week 4 Sept 27	Week 5 Oct 4	Week 6 Oct 11	Week 7 Oct 18	Week 8 Oct 25	Week 9 Nov 1	Week 10 Nov 8	Week 11 Nov 16	Week 12 Nov 22	Week 13 Nov 29	Week 14 Dec 6	Week 15 (Final) Jan 26	
1.	Ohio State (40)	Ohio State (1–0) (46)	Texas (2–0) (56)	Texas (3–0) (58)	Texas (4–0) (62)	Texas (4–0) (61)	Georgia (6–0) (66)	Miami (FL) (6–0) (40)	Miami (FL) (7–0) (59)	Miami (FL) (8–0) (62)	Georgia (8–1) (53)	Georgia (9–1) (58)	Georgia (10–1) (56)				1.
2.	Oregon (14)	Georgia (1–0)	Georgia (2–0) (3)	Georgia (3–0) (3)	Georgia (4–0) (6)	Georgia (5–0) (6)	Notre Dame (6–0) (1)	BYU (6–0) (20)	Ohio State (6–1) (10)	Georgia (7–1) (7)	Utah (9–0) (12)	Utah (10–0) (10)	Utah (11–0) (12)				2.
3.	Georgia	Notre Dame (1–0) (4)	Notre Dame (2–0) (1)	Notre Dame (3–0)	Notre Dame (4–0)	Notre Dame (5–0)	Miami (FL) (5–0) (2)	Ohio State (6–1) (9)	Georgia (6–1)	Utah (8–0) (1)	Notre Dame (8–1) (5)	Notre Dame (9–1) (2)	Notre Dame (10–1) (1)				3.
4.	Notre Dame (6)	Texas (1–0) (2)	Indiana (2–0) (3)	Ole Miss (3–0) (3)	Miami (FL) (4–0) (1)	Miami (FL) (5–0) (2)	Ohio State (5–1)	Notre Dame (6–1)	Indiana (7–1)	Notre Dame (7–1)	UCLA (9–0)	UCLA (10–0)	Miami (FL) (10–1)				4.
5.	Texas	Indiana (1–0) (8)	Miami (FL) (2–0) (4)	Indiana (3–0) (4)	Ohio State (3–1)	Ohio State (4–1)	Indiana (6–0) (1)	Georgia (6–1)	Notre Dame (6–1)	UCLA (8–0)	Miami (FL) (8–1)	Miami (FL) (9–1)	Texas (9–2)				5.
6.	Indiana (8)	Oregon (1–0) (3)	Ohio State (1–1)	Miami (FL) (3–0) (1)	Indiana (4–0) (1)	Alabama (5–0)	Alabama (5–1)	Indiana (6–1)	Utah (7–0) (1)	Indiana (8–1)	Indiana (8–1)	Indiana (9–1)	Alabama (9–2)				6.
7.	Miami (FL) (1)	Miami (FL) (1–0) (1)	LSU (2–0) (1)	Ohio State (2–1)	Alabama (4–0)	Indiana (5–0) (1)	Texas (4–1)	Ole Miss (5–1)	UCLA (7–0)	BYU (7–1)	Alabama (7–2)	Alabama (8–2)	Tennessee (9–2)				7.
8.	Texas A&M	LSU (1–0) (5)	Ole Miss (2–0)	Alabama (3–0)	Florida (4–0)	BYU (4–0)	BYU (5–0)	Texas Tech (6–0) (1)	BYU (6–1)	Kentucky (7–1)	Texas (7–2)	Texas (8–2)	Wake Forest (10–1)				8.
9.	Ole Miss	Ole Miss (1–0)	Texas A&M (2–0)	BYU (3–0)	Ole Miss (3–1)	Ole Miss (3–1)	Ole Miss (4–1)	UCLA (6–0)	Kentucky (7–1)	Alabama (6–2)	Tennessee (7–2)	Tennessee (8–2)	Texas Tech (10–1)				9.
10.	Oklahoma	Texas A&M (1–0)	Alabama (2–0)	LSU (2–1)	BYU (3–0)	LSU (4–1)	Texas Tech (5–0)	Utah (6–0)	Alabama (6–2)	Texas (6–2)	Texas Tech (8–1)	Wake Forest (9–1)	UCLA (10–1)				10.
11.	LSU	Oklahoma (1–0)	BYU (2–0)	Texas Tech (3–0)	LSU (3–1)	Texas Tech (5–0)	Utah (5–0)	Tennessee (6–1)	Texas (5–2)	Ohio State (6–2)	Wake Forest (8–1)	Texas Tech (9–1)	BYU (9–2)				11.
12.	Texas Tech	Alabama (1–0)	USC (3–0)	USC (4–0)	Texas Tech (4–0)	Utah (4–0)	UCLA (5–0)	Kentucky (6–1)	Ole Miss (5–2)	Ole Miss (6–2)	BYU (7–2)	BYU (8–2)	Indiana (9–2)				12.
13.	Alabama	Texas Tech (1–0)	Texas Tech (2–0)	Penn State (3–0)	Utah (4–0)	Oregon (3–1)	Missouri (5–1)	Alabama (5–2)	Texas Tech (6–1)	Texas Tech (7–1)	Kentucky (7–2)	Iowa (8–2)	Iowa (9–2)				13.
14.	BYU т	USC (2–0)	Penn State (2–0)	Tennessee (3–0)	Iowa (4–0)	Missouri (4–1)	Tennessee (5–1)	Houston (6–1)	Wake Forest (6–1)	Wake Forest (7–1)	Houston (7–2)	Oregon (7–3)	Oregon (8–3)				14.
15.	USC т	BYU (1–0)	Tennessee (2–0)	Utah (3–0)	Oregon (3–1)	Tennessee (4–1)	Kentucky (5–1)	Iowa (5–1)	LSU (6–2)	LSU (6–2)	USC (7–2)	Boise State (9–1)	USC (8–3)				15.
16.	Michigan	Penn State (1–0)	SMU (2–0)	Louisville (2–1)	Mississippi State (4–0)	Florida (4–1)	Mississippi State (4–1)	USC (6–1)	Tennessee (6–2)	Tennessee (6–2)	Iowa (7–2)	Ohio State (7–3)	Arizona (8–3)				16.
17.	Washington	SMU (1–0)	Utah (2–0)	Iowa (3–0)	Tennessee (3–1)	Mississippi State (4–1)	Iowa (5–1)	Wake Forest (6–1)	Florida (5–2)	Houston (6–2)	Boise State (8–1)	Kentucky (7–3)	Houston (8–3)				17.
18.	Penn State	Tennessee (1–0)	Iowa (2–0)	Michigan (3–0)	USC (4–1)	Oklahoma State (3–1)	Oklahoma State (4–1)	LSU (5–2)	Houston (6–2)	USC (7–2)	Oregon (6–3)	USC (7–3)	Louisville (8–3)				18.
19.	SMU	Washington (1–0)	Michigan (2–0)	Missouri (3–0)	Oklahoma State (3–1)	USC (5–1)	USC (6–1)	Texas (4–2)	SMU (6–1)	Missouri (6–2)	Ole Miss (6–3)	Arizona (7–3)	Oklahoma (7–4)				19.
20.	Tennessee	Utah (1–0)	Missouri (2–0)	Oregon (2–1)	Houston (3–1)	Iowa (4–1)	Houston (5–1)	Florida (5–2)	Boise State (6–1)т	Boise State (7–1)	South Carolina (6–3)	Houston (7–3)	Florida (7–4)				20.
21.	Utah	Iowa (1–0)	Oregon (1–1)	Florida (3–0)	SMU (3–1)	UCLA (4–0)	Wake Forest (5–1)	Boise State (5–1)	Northwestern (6–1)т	Iowa (6–2)	Ohio State (6–3)	Louisville (7–3)	Liberty (10–1)				21.
22.	Iowa	Houston (1–0)	Houston (2–0)	SMU (2–1)	Boise State (3–1)	Houston (4–1)	LSU (4–2)	Missouri (5–2)	Arizona (6–1)	New Mexico (7–1)	Arizona (7–2)	Liberty (9–1)	Boise State (9–2)				22.
23.	Houston	Missouri (1–0)	Louisville (1–1)	Texas A&M (2–1)	UCLA (4–0)	Boise State (4–1)	Boise State (5–1)	SMU (5–1)	Missouri (5–2)	South Carolina (5–3)	New Mexico (8–1)	Florida (6–4)	Ole Miss (7–4)				23.
24.	Louisville	Louisville (0–1)	Oklahoma (1–1)	Mississippi State (3–0)	Kentucky (3–1)	SMU (4–1)	SMU (4–1)	Northwestern (5–1)	Oklahoma State (5–2)	Arizona (6–2)	LSU (6–3)	Memphis (8–2)	Missouri (7–4)				24.
25.	Missouri	Virginia (1–0)	Virginia (2–0)	Houston (2–1)	Missouri (3–1)	Pittsburgh (5–0)	Northwestern (4–1)	Arizona (5–1)	Wisconsin (5–2)	Florida (5–3)	SMU (7–2)	Ole Miss (6–4)	Ohio State (7–4)				25.
	Preseason Aug 17	Week 1 Sept 8	Week 2 Sept 13	Week 3 Sept 20	Week 4 Sept 27	Week 5 Oct 4	Week 6 Oct 11	Week 7 Oct 18	Week 8 Oct 25	Week 9 Nov 1	Week 10 Nov 8	Week 11 Nov 16	Week 12 Nov 22	Week 13 Nov 29	Week 14 Dec 6	Week 15 (Final) Jan 26	
		Dropped: Michigan (1–0)	Dropped: Washington (2–0)	Dropped: Oklahoma (2–1); Virginia (2–1)	Dropped: Penn State (3–1); Louisville (2–2); Michigan (3–1); Texas A&M (2–2)	Dropped: Kentucky (4–1)	Dropped: Oregon (3–2); Florida (4–2); Pittsburgh (5–1)	Dropped: Mississippi State (4–2); Oklahoma State (4–2)	Dropped: Iowa (5–2); USC (6–2)	Dropped: SMU (6–2); Northwestern (6–2); Oklahoma State (5–3); Wisconsin (5–3)	Dropped: Missouri (6–3); Florida (5–4)	Dropped: South Carolina (6–4); New Mexico (8–2); LSU (6–4); SMU (7–3)	Dropped: Kentucky (7–4); Memphis (8–3)	None	None	None	

== Coaches Poll ==
	Preseason Aug 4	Week 1 Sept 8	Week 2 Sept 13	Week 3 Sept 20	Week 4 Sept 27	Week 5 Oct 4	Week 6 Oct 11	Week 7 Oct 18	Week 8 Oct 25	Week 9 Nov 1	Week 10 Nov 8	Week 11 Nov 15	Week 12 Nov 22	Week 13 Nov 29	Week 14 Dec 6	Week 15 (Final) Jan 26	
1.	Ohio State (38)	Ohio State (1–0) (50)	Texas (2–0) (42)	Texas (3–0) (46)	Texas (4–0) (45)	Texas (4–0) (45)	Georgia (6–0) (60)	Miami (FL) (6–0) (50)	Miami (FL) (7–0) (67)	Miami (FL) (8–0) (68)	Georgia (8–1) (54)	Georgia (9–1) (58)	Georgia (10–1) (60)				1.
2.	Oregon (6)	Georgia (1–0) (7)	Georgia (2–0) (15)	Georgia (3–0) (16)	Georgia (4–0) (17)	Georgia (5–0) (20)	Notre Dame (6–0) (3)	Ohio State (6–1) (13)	Ohio State (6–1) (6)	Georgia (7–1) (4)	Utah (9–0) (14)	Utah (10–0) (11)	Utah (11–0) (12)				2.
3.	Georgia (7)	Texas (1–0) (1)	Notre Dame (2–0) (4)	Notre Dame (3–0) (2)	Notre Dame (4–0) (3)	Notre Dame (5–0) (1)	Miami (FL) (5–0) (1)	BYU (6–0) (10)	Georgia (6–1)	Indiana (8–1)	Notre Dame (8–1) (2)	Notre Dame (9–1) (1)	Notre Dame (10–1) (1)				3.
4.	Texas (2)	Notre Dame (1–0) (4)	Indiana (2–0) (10)	Indiana (3–0) (9)	Miami (FL) (4–0)	Miami (FL) (5–0)	Indiana (6–0) (9)	Georgia (6–1)	Indiana (7–1)	Utah (8–0)	UCLA (9–0) (1)	UCLA (10–0)	Miami (FL) (10–1)				4.
5.	Notre Dame (5)	Indiana (1–0) (11)	Miami (FL) (2–0) (2)	Miami (FL) (3–0) (1)	Indiana (4–0) (8)	Indiana (5–0) (8)	Ohio State (5–1) (1)	Texas Tech (6–0)	Utah (7–0)	UCLA (8–0)	Indiana (8–1) (2)	Indiana (9–1) (3)	Alabama (9–2)				5.
6.	Indiana (14)	Oregon (1–0) (1)	Ohio State (1–1)	Ole Miss (3–0)	Ohio State (3–1)	Ohio State (4–1)	Texas (4–1)	Indiana (6–1)	Notre Dame (6–1)	Notre Dame (7–1)	Miami (FL) (8–1)	Miami (FL) (9–1)	Texas (9–2)				6.
7.	Miami (FL)	Miami (FL) (1–0)	LSU (2–0) (1)	Ohio State (2–1)	Alabama (4–0)	Alabama (5–0)	Alabama (5–1)	Ole Miss (5–1)	UCLA (7–0) (1)	Kentucky (7–1) (1)	Alabama (7–2)	Alabama (8–2)	Tennessee (9–2)				7.
8.	Texas A&M	LSU (1–0)	Texas A&M (2–0)	Alabama (3–0)	Florida (4–0)	BYU (4–0)	BYU (5–0)	Notre Dame (6–1)	Kentucky (7–1)	BYU (7–1)	Texas (7–2)	Texas (8–2)	Wake Forest (10–1)				8.
9.	Oklahoma	Texas A&M (1–0)	Ole Miss (2–0)	BYU (3–0)	BYU (3–0)	Texas Tech (5–0)	Texas Tech (5–0)	Utah (6–0)	BYU (6–1)	Alabama (6–2)	Tennessee (7–2)	Tennessee (8–2)	Texas Tech (10–1)				9.
10.	Ole Miss	Oklahoma (1–0)	Alabama (2–0)	Texas Tech (3–0)	Texas Tech (4–0)	LSU (4–1)	Ole Miss (4–1)	UCLA (6–1)	Alabama (6–2)	Ohio State (6–2)	Texas Tech (8–1)	Wake Forest (9–1)	UCLA (10–1)				10.
11.	Alabama	Ole Miss (1–0)	USC (3–0)	LSU (2–1)	LSU (3–1)	Ole Miss (3–1)	Utah (5–0)	Tennessee (6–1)	Texas (5–2)	Texas (6–2)	Wake Forest (8–1)	Texas Tech (9–1)	BYU (9–2)				11.
12.	Texas Tech	Alabama (1–0)	Texas Tech (2–0)	USC (4–0)	Ole Miss (3–1)	Utah (4–0)	UCLA (5–0)	Kentucky (6–1)	Ole Miss (5–2)	Ole Miss (6–2)	BYU (7–2)	BYU (8–2)	Indiana (9–2)				12.
13.	LSU	Texas Tech (1–0)	BYU (2–0)	Tennessee (3–0)	Utah (4–0)	Oregon (3–1)	Missouri (5–1)	Alabama (5–2)	LSU (6–2)	Texas Tech (7–1)	Kentucky (7–2)	Iowa (8–2)	Iowa (9–2)				13.
14.	USC	USC (2–0)	Tennessee (2–0)	Penn State (3–0)	Iowa (4–0)	Tennessee (4–1)	Tennessee (5–1)	Iowa (5–1)	Texas Tech (6–1)	Wake Forest (7–1)	USC (7–2)	Oregon (7–3)	Oregon (8–3)				14.
15.	BYU	BYU (1–0)	Penn State (2–0)	Utah (3–0)	Oregon (3–1)	Florida (4–1)	USC (6–1)	USC (6–1)	Wake Forest (6–1)	LSU (6–2)	Iowa (7–2)	Boise State (9–1)	USC (8–3)				15.
16.	Michigan	Penn State (1–0)	SMU (2–0)	Oregon (2–1)	Mississippi State (4–0)	Missouri (4–1)	Iowa (5–1)	Houston (6–1)	SMU (6–1)	Tennessee (6–2)	Houston (7–2)	Ole Miss (6–3)	Arizona (8–3)				16.
17.	Penn State	SMU (1–0)	Utah (2–0)	Iowa (3–0)	Tennessee (3–1)	USC (5–1)	Kentucky (5–1)	LSU (5–2)	Tennessee (6–2)	USC (7–2)	Ole Miss (6–3)	Ohio State (7–3)	Houston (8–3)				17.
18.	Tennessee	Tennessee (1–0)	Oregon (1–1)	Michigan (3–0)	USC (4–1)	Iowa (4–1)	Houston (5–1)	Texas (4–2)	Northwestern (6–1)	Houston (6–2)	Boise State (8–1)	Kentucky (7–3)	Louisville (8–3)				18.
19.	Washington	Washington (1–0)	Michigan (2–0)	Louisville (2–1)	SMU (3–1)	Houston (4–1)	Mississippi State (4–1)	Wake Forest (6–1)	Houston (6–2)	Missouri (6–2)	Oregon (6–3)	USC (7–3)	Ole Miss (7–4)				19.
20.	SMU	Utah (1–0)	Iowa (2–0)	Texas A&M (2–1)	Houston (3–1)	Mississippi State (4–1)	Oklahoma State (4–1)	SMU (5–1)	Florida (5–2)	Iowa (6–2)	Ohio State (6–3)	Arizona (7–3)	Florida (7–4)				20.
21.	Utah	Iowa (1–0)	Oklahoma (1–1)	Missouri (3–0)	Duke (4–0)	SMU (4–1)	LSU (4–2)	Missouri (5–2)	Arizona (6–1)	Boise State (7–1)	Arizona (7–2)	Houston (7–3)	Boise State (9–2)				21.
22.	Iowa	Houston (1–0)	Missouri (2–0)	Florida (3–0)	Penn State (3–1)	UCLA (4–0)	SMU (4–1)	Boise State (5–1)	Boise State (6–1)	Arizona (6–2)	LSU (6–3)	Louisville (7–3)	Oklahoma (7–4)				22.
23.	Clemson	Missouri (1–0)	Houston (2–0)	Washington (3–0)	UCLA (4–0)	Duke (4–0)	Wake Forest (5–1)	Northwestern (5–1)	Missouri (5–2)	Northwestern (6–2)	SMU (7–2)	LSU (6–4)	Missouri (7–4)				23.
24.	Houston	Michigan (1–0)	Washington (2–0)	Oklahoma (2–1)	Michigan (3–1)	Pittsburgh (5–0)	Boise State (5–1)	Florida (5–2)	Iowa (5–2)	SMU (6–2)	South Carolina (6–3)	Duke (7–3)	Liberty (10–1)				24.
25.	Missouri	Virginia (1–0) т; Florida (1–0) т	Virginia (2–0)	SMU (2–1)	Missouri (3–1)	Kentucky (4–1)	Oregon (3–2)	Oregon (4–2)	USC (6–2)	New Mexico (7–1)	New Mexico (8–1)	Florida (6–4)	Kentucky (7–4)				25.
	Preseason Aug 4	Week 1 Sept 8	Week 2 Sept 13	Week 3 Sept 20	Week 4 Sept 27	Week 5 Oct 4	Week 6 Oct 11	Week 7 Oct 18	Week 8 Oct 25	Week 9 Nov 1	Week 10 Nov 8	Week 11 Nov 15	Week 12 Nov 22	Week 13 Nov 29	Week 14 Dec 6	Week 15 (Final) Jan 26	
		Dropped: Clemson (0–1)	Dropped: Florida (2–0)	Dropped: Houston (2–1) Virginia (2–1)	Dropped: Louisville (2–2); Texas A&M (2–2); Washington (3–1); Oklahoma (2–2)	Dropped: Penn State (3–2); Michigan (3–2)	Dropped: Florida (4–2); Duke (4–1); Pittsburgh (5–1)	Dropped: Mississippi State (4–2); Oklahoma State (4–2)	Dropped: Oregon (4–3)	Dropped: Florida (5–3)	Dropped: Missouri (6–3); Northwestern (6–3)	Dropped: SMU (7–3); South Carolina (6–4); New Mexico (8–2)	Dropped: Ohio State (7–4); LSU (6–5); Duke (7–4)	None	None	None	

== CFP rankings ==
Bold indicates teams whose rankings result in a bid to the College Football Playoff.

If the committee did not rank a Group of Six conference in the top 25 instead, as indicated by the second table, the committee indicated the top ranked Group of Six team.

	Week 9 Nov 3	Week 10 Nov 10	Week 11 Nov 17	Week 12 Nov 24	Week 13 Dec 1	Week 14 (Final) Dec 6	
1.	**Miami (FL)** (8–0)	**Georgia** (8–1)	**Georgia** (9–1)				1.
2.	**Georgia** (7–1)	**Utah** (9–0)	**Utah** (10–0)				2.
3.	**Utah** (8–0)	**Alabama** (7–2)	**Alabama** (8–2)				3.
4.	**Indiana** (8–1)	**UCLA** (9–0)	**UCLA** (10–0)				4.
5.	**Alabama** (6–2)	**Notre Dame** (8–1)	**Texas** (8–2)				5.
6.	**Kentucky** (7–1)	**Texas** (7–2)	**Notre Dame** (9–1)				6.
7.	**Texas** (6–2)	**Miami (FL)** (8–1)	**Miami (FL)** (9–1)				7.
8.	**UCLA** (8–0)	**Tennessee** (7–2)	**Indiana** (9–1)				8.
9.	**BYU** (7–1)	**Indiana** (8–1)	**Tennessee** (8–2)				9.
10.	**Ole Miss** (6–2)	**BYU** (7–2)	**BYU** (8–2)				10.
11.	**Notre Dame** (7–1)	**Kentucky** (7–2)	**Wake Forest** (9–1)				11.
12.	Ohio State (6–2)	Texas Tech (8–1)	Texas Tech (9–1)				12.
13.	Tennessee (6–2)	Wake Forest (8–1)	Oregon (7–3)				13.
14.	LSU (6–2)	Houston (7–2)	Ohio State (7–3)				14.
15.	Texas Tech (7–1)	Iowa (7–2)	Iowa (8–2)				15.
16.	Wake Forest (7–1)	Oregon (6–3)	Kentucky (7–3)				16.
17.	Houston (6–2)	South Carolina (6–3)	**Boise State** (9–1)				17.
18.	Missouri (6–2)	USC (7–2)	USC (7–3)				18.
19.	Iowa (6–2)	Ole Miss (6–3)	Arizona (7–3)				19.
20.	USC (7–2)	Ohio State (6–3)	Houston (7–3)				20.
21.	South Carolina (5–3)	LSU (6–3)	South Carolina (6–4)				21.
22.	Arizona (6–2)	Missouri (6–3)	Oklahoma (6–4)				22.
23.	Oregon (5–3)	Arizona (7–2)	Louisville (7–3)				23.
24.	Florida (5–3)	**Boise State** (8–1)	Florida (6–4)				24.
25.	**Boise State** (7–1)	Oklahoma State (6–3)	Ole Miss (6–4)				25.
	Week 9 Nov 3	Week 10 Nov 10	Week 11 Nov 17	Week 12 Nov 24	Week 13 Dec 1	Week 14 (Final) Dec 6	
		Dropped: Florida (5–4)	Dropped: LSU (6–4); Missouri (6–4); Oklahoma State (6–4)	None	None	None	

=== Unranked teams with playoff bid ===
	Week 9 Nov	Week 10 Nov	Week 11 Nov	Week 12 Nov	Week 13 Dec	Week 14 (Final) Dec	
G6	None	None	None				G6

== FWAA-NFF Super 16 Poll ==
The joint poll of the Football Writers Association of America and National Football Foundation is a human poll which the NCAA Football Bowl Subdivision Records book designates as being one of the "major selectors" of national championships. The NFF automatically awards its MacArthur Bowl national championship trophy to the winner of the College Football Playoff National Championship.

	Preseason Aug 9	Week 1 Sept 8	Week 2 Sept 13	Week 3 Sept 20	Week 4 Sept 27	Week 5 Oct 4	Week 6 Oct 11	Week 7 Oct 18	Week 8 Oct 25	Week 9 Nov 1	Week 10 Nov 8	Week 11 Nov 15	Week 12 Nov 22	Week 13	Week 14	Week 15 (Final)	
1.	Ohio State (28)	Ohio State (1–0) (32)	Texas (2–0) (33)	Texas (3–0) (36)	Texas (4–0) (36)	Texas (4–0) (34)	Georgia (6–0) (48)	Miami (FL) (6–0) (35)	Miami (FL) (7–0) (49)	Miami (FL) (8–0) (48)	Georgia (8–1) (47)	Georgia (9–1) (47)	Georgia (10–1) (47)				1.
2.	Oregon (7)	Notre Dame (1–0) (6)	Georgia (2–0) (8)	Georgia (3–0) (7)	Georgia (4–0) (12)	Georgia (5–0) (11)	Notre Dame (6–0) (3)	Ohio State (6–1) (12)	Ohio State (6–1) (7)	Georgia (7–1) (7)	Utah (9–0) (8)	Utah (10–0) (8)	Utah (11–0) (9)				2.
3.	Notre Dame (9)	Texas (1–0) (2)	Notre Dame (2–0) (5)	Notre Dame (3–0) (2)	Notre Dame (4–0) (3)	Miami (FL) (5–0) (2)	Miami (FL) (5–0) (1)	BYU (6–0) (9)	Georgia (6–1)	Utah (8–0)	Notre Dame (8–1) (1)	Notre Dame (9–1) (1)	Notre Dame (10–1)				3.
4.	Texas (3)	Georgia (1–0) (1)	Miami (FL) (2–0) (4)	Miami (FL) (3–0) (2)	Miami (FL) (4–0) (1)	Notre Dame (5–0) (3)	Ohio State (5–1)	Georgia (6–1)	Indiana (7–1)	UCLA (8–0)	UCLA (9–0)	UCLA (10–0)	Miami (FL) (10–1)				4.
5.	Georgia (2)	Miami (FL) (1–0) (3)	Indiana (2–0) (5)	Ole Miss (3–0) (5)	Ohio State (3–1) (1)	Ohio State (4–1) (1)	Indiana (6–0) (4)	Indiana (6–1)	UCLA (7–0)	Notre Dame (7–1) (1)	Indiana (8–1)	Miami (FL) (9–1)	Texas (9–2)				5.
6.	Indiana (7)	Indiana (1–0) (5)	Ohio State (1–1)	Indiana (3–0) (3)	Indiana (4–0) (3)	Alabama (5–0) (2)	Alabama (5–1)	Notre Dame (6–1)	Notre Dame (6–1)	Indiana (8–1)	Miami (FL) (8–1)	Indiana (9–1)	Alabama (9–2)				6.
7.	Miami (FL)	Oregon (1–0)	LSU (2–0) (1)	Ohio State (2–1) (1)	Alabama (4–0)	Indiana (5–0) (3)	Texas (4–1)	Texas Tech (6–0)	Utah (7–0)	BYU (7–1)	Alabama (7–2)	Alabama (8–2)	Tennessee (9–2)				7.
8.	Ole Miss	LSU (1–0) (6)	Ole Miss (2–0)	Alabama (3–0)	Florida (4–0)	BYU (4–0)	BYU (5–0)	Ole Miss (5–1)	BYU (6–1)	Kentucky (7–1)	Texas (7–2)	Texas (8–2)	Wake Forest (10–1)				8.
9.	Texas A&M	Ole Miss (1–0) (1)	Texas A&M (2–0)	LSU (2–1)	BYU (3–0)	LSU (4–1)	Ole Miss (4–1)	UCLA (6–0)	Kentucky (7–1)	Alabama (6–2)	Tennessee (7–2)	Tennessee (8–2)	UCLA (10–1)				9.
10.	Oklahoma	Oklahoma (1–0)	Alabama (2–0)	BYU (3–0)	LSU (3–1)	Ole Miss (3–1)	Texas Tech (5–0)	Tennessee (6–1)	Alabama (6–2)	Texas (6–2)	Texas Tech (8–1)	Wake Forest (9–1)	Texas Tech (10–1)				10.
11.	Texas Tech	Texas A&M (1–0)	USC (3–0)	USC (4–0)	Ole Miss (3–1)	Texas Tech (5–0)	Utah (5–0)	Utah (6–0)	Texas (5–2)	Ohio State (6–2)	Wake Forest (8–1)	Texas Tech (9–1)	BYU (9–2)				11.
12.	LSU	Alabama (1–0)	Texas Tech (2–0)	Texas Tech (3–0)	Texas Tech (4–0)	Utah (4–0)	UCLA (5–0)	Kentucky (6–1)	LSU (6–2)	Ole Miss (6–2)	BYU (7–2)	BYU (8–2)	Indiana (9–2)				12.
13.	Alabama	USC (2–0)	BYU (2–0)	Penn State (3–0)	Utah (4–0)	Oregon (3–1)	Missouri (5–1)	Alabama (5–2)	Ole Miss (5–2)	Texas Tech (7–1)	Kentucky (7–2)	Oregon (7–3)	Oregon (8–3) т				13.
14.	USC	Texas Tech (1–0)	Tennessee (2–0)	Tennessee (3–0)	Oregon (3–1)	Florida (4–1)	Tennessee (5–1)	USC (6–1)	Texas Tech (6–1)	LSU (6–2)	USC (7–2)	Iowa (8–2)	Iowa (9–2) т				14.
15.	BYU	BYU (1–0)	Penn State (2–0)	Utah (3–0)	Iowa (4–0)	Tennessee (4–1)	Kentucky (5–1)	Iowa (5–1)	Wake Forest (6–1)	Wake Forest (7–1)	Houston (7–2)	Boise State (9–1)	USC (8–3)				15.
16.	Michigan	Penn State (1–0)	Oregon (1–1)	Louisville (2–1)	Mississippi State (4–0)	Missouri (4–1)	USC (6–1)	Houston (6–1)	Tennessee (6–2)	Tennessee (6–2)	Oregon (6–3)	Ohio State (7–3)	Arizona (8–3)				16.
	Preseason Aug 9	Week 1 Sept 8	Week 2 Sept 13	Week 3 Sept 20	Week 4 Sept 27	Week 5 Oct 4	Week 6 Oct 11	Week 7 Oct 18	Week 8 Oct 25	Week 9 Nov 1	Week 10 Nov 8	Week 11 Nov 15	Week 12 Nov 22	Week 13	Week 14	Week 15 (Final)	
		Dropped: Michigan (1–0)	Dropped: Oklahoma (1–1)	Dropped: Texas A&M (2–1); Oregon (2–1)	Dropped: USC (4–1); Penn State (3–1); Tennessee (3–1); Louisville (2–2)	Dropped: Iowa (4–1); Mississippi State (4–1)	Dropped: LSU (4–2); Oregon (3–2); Florida (4–2)	Dropped: Texas (4–2); Missouri (5–2)	Dropped: USC (6–2); Iowa (5–2); Houston (6–2)	None	Dropped: Ohio State (6–3); Ole Miss (6–3); LSU (6–3)	Dropped: Kentucky (7–3); USC (7–3); Houston (7–3)	Dropped: Boise State (9–2); Ohio State (7–4)	None	None	None	
