= Bryan Murphy =

Bryan Murphy may refer to:

- Bryan Murphy (Gaelic footballer) (born 1967), Irish Gaelic football manager; dual player hurling and Gaelic football
- Bryan Murphy (hurler) (born 1993), Irish hurler
- Bryan Murphy (athlete) represented Ireland at the 2006 European Athletics Championships
- Bryan Murphy (American football), played in 2008 Boston College Eagles football team

== See also ==
- Brian Murphy (disambiguation)
