= Brian Murphy (businessman) =

American business and founder of ReliaQuest

- Born: 1977 (age 48–49)
- Education: Florida State University
- Spouse: Renee Murphy (2005)
- Children: 2
- Website: reliaquest.com

Brian Murphy (born 1977) is an American businessman known for being the founder and chief executive officer of cybersecurity technology company, ReliaQuest.

== Early life and education ==
Murphy's parents originally lived in Upstate New York. They soon moved to Margate, Florida, where Murphy was born in 1977, and then moved to Middleburg, near Jacksonville, Florida. Murphy's father was a diesel mechanic and his mother worked at Publix Super Markets, an American supermarket chain, where Murphy and his brothers worked as teenagers.

Murphy graduated from Florida State University (FSU) in 2000 with a bachelor's degree in accounting and finance. After he graduated, he began working in accounting, finance and information technology consulting work as a management consultant at PricewaterhouseCoopers in Tampa, Florida.

== Business career ==
In 2007, Murphy left his job in corporate accounting and founded ReliaQuest. Murphy came up with the name after consulting with a friend who owned a marketing firm, with "ReliaQuest" being one of the recommended options. Murphy bootstrapped the company and invested his own money in response client attrition due to the 2008 financial crisis. This prompted Murphy and the company's then eight employees to focus on a single government sub-sub-contract specific to the cybersecurity of overseas satellite terminals. Murphy took out a second mortgage, maxed out credit cards and eliminated his salary to keep the company afloat.

In 2016, ReliaQuest received its first outside investment of $30 million from FTV Capital. In 2021, Murphy grew ReliaQuest into a unicorn startup with a $1 billion valuation after receiving investment from FTV Capital and KKR Growth. By 2025, Murphy had grown ReliaQuest to a valuation of $3.4 billion, which is often referred to as a "triple unicorn".

In May 2017, Murphy was the commencement speaker at his alma mater, Florida State University. Murphy is a trustee of FSU and, in April 2026, helped ReliaQuest enter into partnership with the university focused on teaching applications of artificial intelligence within cybersecurity. Murphy has served on the board of governors for FSU College of Business and the board of directors for the Seminole Boosters. That same year, Murphy announced a partnership between University of South Florida (USF) and ReliaQuest to create the first endowed professorship at USF's College of Artificial Intelligence, Cybersecurity and Computing.

In June 2017, Murphy was the recipient of Ernst & Young's Entrepreneur of the Year award in the IT security division.

In 2021, Murphy was appointed as the chairman of the board for Jeff Vinik's Embarc Collective, a business incubator for Florida tech companies.

In 2023, Murphy received Goldman Sachs' "Most Exceptional Entrepreneur" award.

== Personal life ==
Murphy met his future wife, Renee, while attending Florida State University. They reside in Tampa, Florida with their two children.

Murphy and his wife have donated $1 million to the Academy of Holy Names, a private school based in Tampa, Florida. In March 2024, they donated $1.5 million to the financial aid program at Jesuit High School. They have also donated to Florida State University, non-profit organization Junior Achievement, and Voices for Children, a Ukrainian charity.

Murphy's hobbies include golfing and boating.
