= Elijah Brown (American football) =

American football player

No. 7 – Washington Huskies
- Position: Quarterback
- Class: Redshirt Sophomore

Personal information
- Listed height: 6 ft 2 in (1.88 m)
- Listed weight: 205 lb (93 kg)

Career information
- High school: Mater Dei (Santa Ana, California)
- College: Stanford (2024–2025); Washington (2026–present)
- Stats at ESPN

Elijah Brown is an American college football quarterback for the Washington Huskies. He previously played for the Stanford Cardinal.

== Early life ==
Brown is from Huntington Beach, California. He grew up playing football and played quarterback at Mater Dei High School in Santa Ana, California, winning the starting job as a freshman, only the fourth person to accomplish the feat. As a sophomore, he led Mater Dei to a perfect 12–0 record and the CIF Open Division state title, throwing for 2,581 yards and 30 touchdowns while being named the MaxPreps National Sophomore of the Year. Brown then led his team to a record of 12–1 in 2023, throwing for 2,785 yards and 31 touchdowns with only four interceptions.

Prior to his senior year, Brown participated at the Elite 11 finals. He then won the CIF Southern Section Division 1 and the CIF State Open Division championships in 2023, being named the Orange County offensive player of the year after throwing for 2,950 yards and 39 touchdowns to five interceptions. He finished his four-year stint at Mater Dei having led them to an overall record of 42–2. A four-star recruit, he committed to play college football for the Stanford Cardinal. He was the highest-ranked quarterback to sign with Stanford since Tanner McKee in 2018.

== College career ==
Brown entered his true freshman season at Stanford in 2024 as a backup, seeing his first playing time in a win over Cal Poly, completing all seven of his passes for 97 yards. After missing several games due to injury, he played again in a loss to SMU after an injury to Ashton Daniels, completing 16 of 32 passes for 153 yards, a touchdown and two interceptions. The following week, he made his first career start, completing five of nine passes for 24 yards. He sat out the rest of the season to preserve a redshirt, finishing with 274 yards passing and two touchdowns with three interceptions.

=== College statistics ===
Season	Team	Games			Passing								Rushing			
Season	Team	GP	GS	Record	Cmp	Att	Pct	Yds	Avg	TD	Int	Rtg	Att	Yds	Avg	TD
2024	Stanford	3	1	0–1	28	48	58.3	274	5.7	2	3	107.5	14	-23	-1.6	0
2025	Stanford	6	3	1–2	74	127	58.3	829	6.5	4	2	120.3	17	-96	-5.6	0
2026	Washington	3	1	1–0	51	69	73.9	578	8.4	7	3	169.3	5	-30	-6.0	0
Career		12	5	2-3	153	244	62.7	1,681	6.9	13	8	131.6	36	-149	-4.1	0
