= Brian Murphy (1990s Gaelic footballer) =

Irish Gaelic footballer

Bryan Murphy
Personal information
- Native name: Brian Ó Murchú (Irish)
- Born: County Kerry, Ireland

Sport
- Sport: Gaelic football
- Position: Goalkeeper
Clubs
- Years: Club
- ?- Present underage-?: Beaufort; Naomh Barróg
Inter-county
Years	County	Apps (scores)
2001-2006	Dublin	9 (0-00)
Inter-county titles
- Leinster titles: 2

Bryan Murphy is a former Gaelic football goalkeeper at senior level for the Kerry and Dublin county teams. He won an All-Ireland Minor Football Championship with Kerry in 1994. County Dublin and joined Naomh Barróg in Kilbarrack. He received a Leinster Senior Football Championship medal for Dublin in 2002 as a member of the panel, but was yet to make his debut in the championship. He made his National League debut against Offaly in 2002, and his championship debut in 2003 against Armagh.
