= ReliaQuest =

American cybersecurity company

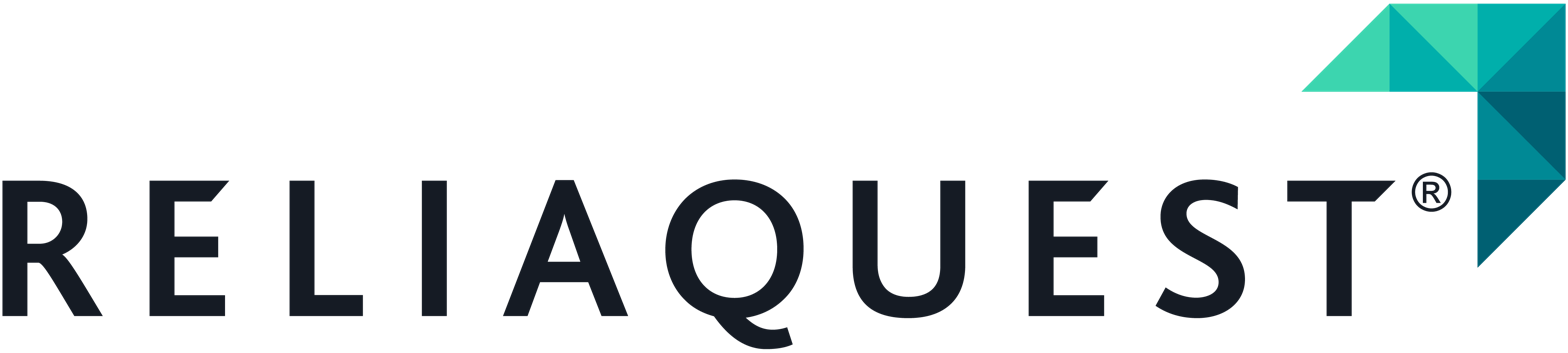
- Industry: Cybersecurity
- Founded: 2007
- Founders: Brian Muprhy
- Headquarters: Tampa, Florida, USA
- Number of employees: 1000+
- Website: www.reliaquest.com

ReliaQuest is an American cybersecurity technology company headquartered in Tampa, Florida, with offices in Salt Lake City, Las Vegas, London, Dublin and Pune, India. The company provides threat detection, investigation and response through its GreyMatter security platform, which employs artificial intelligence to automate many of those cybersecurity tasks.

As of 2022, they are the title sponsor of the ReliaQuest Bowl in the National Collegiate Athletic Association.

== History ==
ReliaQuest was founded in 2007 by CEO Brian Murphy in Tampa, Florida. Murphy attended Florida State University, graduating with a degree in accounting and finance. He began his career as an auditor before transitioning into technology consulting, programming and IT services. ReliaQuest was established shortly before the onset of the 2008 financial crisis, which impacted early operations. Murphy continued to invest in the company, reportedly taking out a second mortgage, suspending his own salary, and bootstrapping the company for its first nine years.

In June 2016, the company received its first outside capital investment of $30 million from FTV Capital. In 2017, ReliaQuest was added to the Deloitte Technology Fast 500 for the first time, and made the list again in 2018, 2019 and 2020. In 2020, ReliaQuest raised $300 million in funding, and in 2021 ReliaQuest's valuation grew to more than $1 billion. In 2022, ReliaQuest acquired Digital Shadows for $160 million and EclecticIQ in 2023 for an undisclosed amount.

The company implemented a mental performance program for its employees, including hiring sports psychologists. In March 2023, the Washington Post reported that ReliaQuest maintained a retention rate of 85 percent or higher and saw improvements in employee engagement due to the program.

As of April 2025, the company’s annual recurring revenue totaled more than $300 million, according to company sources, and employed 1,200 employees. That month, the company was valued at $3.4 billion following a fundraising round reported to have raised $500 million. The round was led by EQT, KKR, FTV Capital, with participation from investors such as Ten Eleven Ventures and Finback Investment Partners. The company planned to use the fundraising to support international expansion and agentic AI-powered cybersecurity automation.

As of July 2025, it remains headquartered in Tampa and has offices in Salt Lake City, Las Vegas, London, Dublin and Pune.

== Technology ==
The company created the technology-agnostic cyber security platform GreyMatter, which was built on an open XDR architecture and which uses agentic AI for threat detection, containment, investigation and response. The platform automates many aspects of security operations, normalizing data across security technologies for rapid threat detection, containment, investigation and response. The company holds 52 patents for technology, including one for a universal translator that provides "comprehensive threat detection" response across security technologies. GreyMatter integrates with cybersecurity and enterprise tools.

== Partnerships & sponsorships ==
The company is the title sponsor of the ReliaQuest Bowl in the NCAA. Since the sponsorship commenced, annual games have included the 2023 ReliaQuest Bowl, the 2024 ReliaQuest Bowls (December, January), and the 2025 ReliaQuest Bowl, scheduled for December 31, 2025.

ReliaQuest also sponsors cybersecurity awareness programs at the elementary school and university levels in the Florida education system; which included coding boot camps focused on cybersecurity training. In 2018, ReliaQuest partnered with the University of South Florida to launch the ReliaQuest Labs program based in the Muma College of Business. The program focuses on computer security training and job placement, and has placed 300 students as of May 2024.
