= Kamari Moulton =

American football player (born 2005)

No. 28 – Iowa Hawkeyes
- Position: Running back
- Class: Redshirt Junior

Personal information
- Born: April 1, 2005 (age 21)
- Listed height: 5 ft 9 in (1.75 m)
- Listed weight: 211 lb (96 kg)

Career information
- High school: Cardinal Gibbons (Fort Lauderdale, Florida)
- College: Iowa (2023–present)
- Stats at ESPN

Kamari Moulton (born April 1, 2005) is an American college football running back for the Iowa Hawkeyes.

== Early life ==
Moulton attended high school at Cardinal Gibbons located in Fort Lauderdale, Florida. Coming out of high school, he was rated as a three-star recruit, where he committed to play college football for the Florida Atlantic Owls, over other offers from schools such as Syracuse, Akron, Appalachian State, Buffalo, Central Michigan, UConn, and Toledo. However, Moulton would later flip his commitment to play for the Iowa Hawkeyes after receiving a late offer.

== College career ==
During his first collegiate season in 2023, he appeared in four games, rushing for 93 yards and two touchdowns on 27 carries. In the 2024 Music City Bowl, Moulton rushed for 96 yards and a touchdown in a loss to Missouri. He finished the 2024 season, rushing for 473 yards and three touchdowns on 83 carries. Moulton was named the team's starting running back for the 2025 season, putting up 878 yards and 5 touchdowns on the ground, and another 97 yards receiving. Heading into the 2026 season, Moulton was again named the team's starting running back. He ran for a then career-high 183 yards and two touchdowns in the season opener against Northern Illinois. In Week 6, Moulton established a new career-high with 208 yards and two touchdowns in a road win over Washington.

=== Statistics ===
Year	Team	G	Rushing					Receiving				
Year	Team	G	Att	Yards	Avg	Long	TD	Rec	Yards	Avg	Long	TD
2023	Iowa	4	27	93	3.4	18	2	0	0	0.0	0	0
2024	Iowa	12	84	473	5.6	68T	3	1	12	12.0	12	0
2025	Iowa	11	170	878	5.2	34	5	16	97	6.1	11	0
2026	Iowa	6	86	541	6.3	56T	4	9	31	3.4	–	0
Career		33	367	1,985	5.4	68T	14	26	140	5.4	12	0
