= Reece Vander Zee =

American football wide receiver (born 2005)

No. 2 – Iowa Hawkeyes
- Position: Wide receiver
- Class: Junior

Personal information
- Born: September 16, 2005 (age 21)
- Listed height: 6 ft 4 in (1.93 m)
- Listed weight: 220 lb (100 kg)

Career information
- High school: Central Lyon (Rock Rapids, Iowa)
- College: Iowa (2024–present)
- Stats at ESPN

Reece Vander Zee (born September 16, 2005) is an American football wide receiver for the Iowa Hawkeyes.

== Early life ==
Vander Zee attended Central Lyon High School in Rock Rapids, Iowa. He committed to play college football for the Iowa Hawkeyes over Iowa State.

== College career ==
In the 2024 season opener, Vander Zee hauled in two touchdowns in a win over Illinois State. He finished his freshman season in 2024 with 14 catches for 176 yards and three touchdowns. In 2025 he hauled in 15 passes for 219 yards and two touchdowns. In week four of the 2026 season, Vander Zee notched 66 yards and two touchdowns, including the game-winning touchdown reception as time expired over Michigan.

=== Statistics ===
| Year | Team | G | Receiving | | | | | Rushing | | | | |
| Year | Team | G | Rec | Yards | Avg | Long | TD | Att | Yards | Avg | Long | TD |
|---|---|---|---|---|---|---|---|---|---|---|---|---|
| 2024 | Iowa | 9 | 14 | 176 | 12.6 | 19 | 3 | 0 | 0 | 0.0 | 0 | 0 |
| 2025 | Iowa | 8 | 15 | 219 | 14.6 | 29 | 2 | 0 | 0 | 0.0 | 0 | 0 |
| 2026 | Iowa | 9 | 28 | 403 | 14.4 | 37 | 4 | 0 | 0 | 0.0 | 0 | 0 |
| Career | | 26 | 57 | 798 | 14.0 | 37 | 9 | 0 | 0 | 0.0 | 0 | 0 |
