= DJ Vonnahme =

American football player (born 2006)

No. 81 – Iowa Hawkeyes
- Position: Tight end
- Class: Redshirt Sophomore

Personal information
- Born: February 2, 2006 (age 20)
- Listed height: 6 ft 4 in (1.93 m)
- Listed weight: 240 lb (109 kg)

Career information
- High school: Kuemper (Carroll, Iowa)
- College: Iowa (2024–present)
- Stats at ESPN

DJ Vonnahme (born February 2, 2006) is an American college football tight end for the Iowa Hawkeyes.

== Early life ==
Vonnahme attended Kuemper Catholic School in Carroll, Iowa, where he played numerous positions including quarterback. During his high school career he had 1,803 passing yards, 25 passing touchdowns, 652 rushing yards, 14 rushing touchdowns, 697 receiving yards and 14 receiving touchdowns. He also played safety on defense and finished with 11 career interceptions and two defensive touchdowns. Vonnahme committed to the University of Iowa to play college football as a preferred walk-on.

== College career ==
After playing in four games and recording no stats his first year at Iowa in 2024, Vonnahme earned more playing time his redshirt freshman year in 2025. He had his first career touchdown against the ninth ranked Oregon Ducks.

=== Statistics ===
Year	Team	G	Receiving					Rushing				
Year	Team	G	Rec	Yards	Avg	Long	TD	Att	Yards	Avg	Long	TD
2024	Iowa	4	Redshirt									
2025	Iowa	12	29	434	15.0	51	3	0	0	0.0	0	0
2026	Iowa	8	32	314	9.8	45	3	3	12	4.0	8	1
Career		24	61	748	12.3	51	6	3	12	4.0	8	1
