= Chris Lawson (American football) =

American football player

No. 8 – Washington Huskies
- Position: Wide receiver
- Class: Sophomore

Personal information
- Listed height: 6 ft 0 in (1.83 m)
- Listed weight: 185 lb (84 kg)

Career information
- High school: Archbishop Riordan (San Francisco, California)
- College: Washington (2025–present)
- Stats at ESPN

Chris Lawson is an American college football wide receiver for the Washington Huskies.

== Early life ==
Lawson attended Archbishop Riordan High School in San Francisco, California, where he played wide receiver and defensive back. During his high school career he had 196 receptions for 2,949 yards and 38 touchdowns. He committed to the University of Washington to play college football.

== College career ==
As a freshman at Washington in 2025, Lawson played in eight games and had 10 receptions for 115 yards. He took over as a starter during his sophomore year in 2026.
