= 2026 Big Ten Conference football season =

- League: NCAA Division I Football Bowl Subdivision
- Sport: Football
- Duration: August 29, 2026 through January 1, 2027
- Teams: 18
- TV partner(s): Fox Sports (Fox, FS1, Big Ten Network); CBS Sports (CBS, Paramount+); NBC Sports (NBC, Peacock)

2027 NFL draft

Regular season

Championship Game

Football seasons
- 2025 2027

2026 Big Ten Conference football standings
	Conf.			Overall
Team	W		L	W		L
No. 4 UCLA	7	–	1	10	–	1
No. 8 Indiana	6	–	2	9	–	2
No. 15 Iowa	6	–	2	9	–	2
No. 13 Oregon	6	–	2	8	–	3
No. 18 USC	5	–	3	8	–	3
No. 14 Ohio State	5	–	3	7	–	4
Wisconsin	5	–	3	7	–	4
Nebraska	4	–	4	7	–	4
Washington	4	–	4	7	–	4
Illinois	4	–	4	6	–	5
Minnesota	4	–	4	6	–	5
Michigan	3	–	5	6	–	5
Northwestern	3	–	5	6	–	5
Penn State	3	–	5	6	–	5
Maryland	2	–	6	4	–	7
Purdue	2	–	6	3	–	8
Rutgers	2	–	6	3	–	8
Michigan State	1	–	7	3	–	8
Championship: December 5, 2026
^ – College Football Playoff participant; $ – Conference champion; y – Championship game participant; As of November 22, 2026; Rankings from CFP rankings

The 2026 Big Ten Conference football season is the 131st season of college football play for the Big Ten Conference and part of the 2026 NCAA Division I FBS football season. This is the Big Ten's third season with 18 teams and its third season since 2010 with a non-divisional scheduling format.

== Head coaches ==
=== Coaching changes ===
==== Maryland ====
On October 21, 2026, the University of Maryland announced head coach Mike Locksley had been relieved of his duties. Locksley was 39–54 over his eight seasons with the Terrapins, including going 10-21 since 2024. Maryland has named longtime assistant Aazaar Abdul-Rahim as interim head coach.

==== Michigan ====
On December 10, 2025, the University of Michigan announced head coach Sherrone Moore had been fired for cause due to "credible evidence" that Moore engaged in an inappropriate relationship with a staff member. On December 26, the school named Utah head coach Kyle Whittingham the team's 22nd head football coach, agreeing to a five-year contract.

==== Michigan State ====
On November 30, 2025, Michigan State announced that it had fired head coach Jonathan Smith after going 4–15 in his two years with the program. On December 1, 2025, the Spartans announced Pat Fitzgerald as its head football coach. He was previously the head coach for Northwestern from 2006 until 2023 before he was fired amidst the team's hazing scandal.

==== Penn State ====
Midway through the 2025 season, on October 12, 2025, Penn State announced it had fired James Franklin after 12 seasons. He finishes with a 104–45 overall record. Assistant coach Terry Smith was named the interim to finish out the season. On December 5, 2025, the team announced that Iowa State head coach Matt Campbell as their next head football coach.

==== UCLA ====
After a 0–3 start to 2025 season, on September 14, 2025, UCLA announced that head coach DeShaun Foster was fired. He finished his head coaching tenure with a 5–10 record. Assistant coach Tim Skipper served as the interim head coach to finish out the season. On December 6, 2025, the Bruins announced that they had hired James Madison head coach Bob Chesney as their next head football coach.

=== Coaches ===
As of November 21, 2026

Team	Head coach	Previous job	Years at school	Overall record	Record at school	Big Ten record
Illinois	Bret Bielema	New York Giants (OLB)	6	140–89 (.611)	43–31 (.581)	27–26 (.509)
Indiana	Curt Cignetti	James Madison	3	155–39 (.799)	36–4 (.900)	23–3 (.885)
Iowa	Kirk Ferentz	Baltimore Ravens (AHC/OL)	28	232–151 (.606)	222–130 (.631)	140–93 (.601)
Maryland	Mike Locksley (Terminated)	Alabama (OC)	8	41–80 (.339)	39–54 (.419)	17–52 (.246)
Maryland	Aazaar Abdul-Rahim (interim)†	Maryland (Co-DC)	8	2–2 (.500)	2–2 (.500)	2–2 (.500)
Michigan	Kyle Whittingham	Utah	1	183–93 (.663)	6–5 (.545)	3–5 (.375)
Michigan State	Pat Fitzgerald	Northwestern	1	113–109 (.509)	3–8 (.273)	66–83 (.443)
Minnesota	P. J. Fleck	Western Michigan	10	102–71 (.590)	72–49 (.595)	43–44 (.494)
Nebraska	Matt Rhule	Carolina Panthers	4	73–66 (.525)	26–23 (.531)	14–21 (.400)
Northwestern	David Braun	Northwestern (DC)	4	25–24 (.510)	25–24 (.510)	14–21 (.400)
Ohio State	Ryan Day	Ohio State (OC/QB)	8	89–16 (.848)	89–16 (.848)	60–8 (.882)
Oregon	Dan Lanning	Georgia (DC/OLB)	5	56–11 (.836)	56–11 (.836)	23–3 (.885)
Penn State	Matt Campbell	Iowa State	1	113–75 (.601)	6–5 (.545)	3–5 (.375)
Purdue	Barry Odom	UNLV	2	49–51 (.490)	5–18 (.217)	2–15 (.118)
Rutgers	Greg Schiano	Ohio State (AHC/DC)	18	102–116 (.468)	102–116 (.468)	17–45 (.274)
UCLA	Bob Chesney	James Madison	1	142–53 (.728)	10–1 (.909)	7–1 (.875)
USC	Lincoln Riley	Oklahoma	5	98–31 (.760)	43–21 (.672)	16–10 (.615)
Washington	Jedd Fisch	Arizona	3	39–37 (.513)	22–15 (.595)	13–13 (.500)
Wisconsin	Luke Fickell	Cincinnati	4	87–50 (.635)	24–25 (.490)	15–20 (.429)

Notes:

- All records, appearances, titles, etc. are from time with current school only.
- Year at school includes 2026 season.
- Overall and Big Ten records are from time at current school only and are through the beginning of the season.

† Mike Locksley was fired after 7 games into the season, he finished with a career record of 39–54 (17–52 conference play).

== Preseason ==
=== Recruiting classes ===
Rankings as of June 22, 2026
Team	On3/Rivals	Scout & 24/7	Signees
Illinois	6	6	37
Indiana	8	9	22
Iowa	7	7	18
Maryland	11	11	19
Michigan	4	4	26
Michigan State	14	12	21
Minnesota	9	8	31
Nebraska	18	18	12
Northwestern	13	13	23
Ohio State	2	3	28
Oregon	3	2	23
Penn State	15	16	15
Purdue	12	14	25
Rutgers	10	10	23
UCLA	16	15	20
USC	1	1	35
Washington	5	5	27
Wisconsin	17	17	15

=== Big Ten Media Days ===
- July 28–30, 2026 – Media Days, Chicago

==== Preseason Media Poll ====
The annual Cleveland.com Preseason Big Ten Media Poll.

Predicted finish	Team	Points (1st place votes)
1	Ohio State	540 (15)
2	Oregon	527 (11)
3	Indiana	509 (5)
4	USC	446
5	Michigan	430
6	Penn State	380
7	Washington	366
8	Iowa	361
9	Illinois	304
10	Minnesota	268
11	Nebraska	246
12	Wisconsin	207
13	UCLA	199
14	Northwestern	140
15	Maryland	137
16	Michigan State	99
17	Rutgers	97
18	Purdue	45

Predicted Big Ten Champion
Rank	Team	Votes
1	Ohio State	16
2	Oregon	8
3	Indiana	4

==== Preseason Player of the Year ====
Preseason Offensive Player of the Year
Rank	Player	Position	Team	Points (1st place votes)
1	Jeremiah Smith	WR	Ohio State	82 (21)
2	Dante Moore	QB	Oregon	62 (8)
3	Julian Sayin	QB	Ohio State	25 (2)
4	Jayden Maiava	QB	USC	7
5	Josh Hoover	QB	Indiana	5
T-6	Turbo Richard	RB	Indiana	1
T-6	Demond Williams	QB	Washington	1
T-6	Carter Smith	OL	Indiana	1
T-6	Drake Lindsey	QB	Minnesota	1
T-6	Bo Jackson	RB	Ohio State	1

Preseason Defensive Player of the Year
Rank	Player	Position	Team	Points (1st place votes)
1	Anthony Smith	DL	Minnesota	26 (2)
2	Brandon Finney Jr	CB	Oregon	25 (6)
3	Koi Perich	S	Oregon	22 (4)
4	Teitum Tuioti	DL	Oregon	20 (6)
5	A'Mauri Washington	DT	Oregon	20 (5)
6	Tyrique Tucker	DL	Indiana	17 (3)
7	John Henry Daley	DE	Michigan	15 (2)
8	Rolijah Hardy	LB	Indiana	8 (2)
9	Matayo Uiagalelei	DE	Oregon	7
10	Jamari Sharpe	CB	Iowa	6
11	Earl Little	S	Ohio State	3
12	Anthony Jones	DE	Nebraska	2
T-13	Amare Ferrell	S	Indiana	1
T-13	Kenyatta Jackson	DE	Ohio State	1
T-13	Jaylen McClain	S	Ohio State	1
T-13	Isaiah Jones	LB	Indiana	1

=== All-American Teams ===
Player	AP	AS	WCFF	ESPN	CBS	CFN	PFF	SN	SI	USAT
Bear Alexander		4th team								
Jacory Barney Jr.		4th team								
Charlie Becker	2nd team	2nd team		2nd team	2nd team			2nd team	2nd team	
Benjamin Brahmer		4th team								
John Henry Daley	2nd team	1st team	2nd team	2nd team					1st team	2nd team
KJ Duff	2nd team	2nd team	2nd team					2nd team		
Justin Evans		4th team								
Amare Ferrell		2nd team		2nd team						
Brandon Finney Jr.	2nd team	3rd team	1st team	2nd team	2nd team			2nd team	1st team	1st team
Rolijah Hardy	1st team	1st team	2nd team	2nd team	2nd team			1st team		1st team
Jyaire Hill		4th team								
Carson Hinzman		4th team								
Bo Jackson		3rd team								
Kenyatta Jackson		4th team								
Greg Johnson	2nd team			2nd team	2nd team				2nd team	2nd team
Jamari Johnson		2nd team	2nd team							1st team
Isaiah Jones		2nd team	2nd team						1st team	
Wayne Knight	1st team	4th team								1st team
Iapani Laloulu		1st team		2nd team				2nd team	2nd team	1st team
Trevor Lauck		2nd team		2nd team						
Zach Lutmer		4th team						2nd team		
Nick Marsh		3rd team		2nd team						2nd team
Jordan Marshall		4th team								
Jermaine Mathews Jr.									2nd team	
Bryce McFerson		4th team								
Luke Montgomery	2nd team	4th team			1st team			2nd team	2nd team	
Dakorien Moore		4th team								
Dante Moore	1st team	3rd team			1st team					1st team
Marcus Neal Jr.		4th team								
Koi Perich	1st team	2nd & 3rd team			1st team			2nd team	2nd team	2nd team
Kade Pieper	1st team	1st team	1st team	1st team	2nd team			1st team	1st team	1st team
Antwan Raymond		3rd team								
Julian Sayin		2nd team	2nd team	1st team						2nd team
Jamari Sharpe		4th team								
Austin Siereveld		2nd team	1st team					2nd team		
Anthony Smith	2nd team	2nd team	2nd team	2nd team	2nd team			1st team		2nd team
Carter Smith	1st team	1st team	1st team	1st team	1st team			1st team	1st team	1st team
Jeremiah Smith	1st team	1st team	1st team	1st team	1st team			1st team	1st team	1st team
Andrew Sprague		4th team	2nd team							
Tyrique Tucker	2nd team	1st team	1st team						2nd team	1st team
Teitum Tuioti		2nd team	1st team							
Matayo Uiagalelei		3rd team								
DJ Vonnahme								2nd team		
A'Mauri Washington	1st team	1st team	2nd team	1st team	1st team			1st team	1st team	1st team
Daniel Wingate		4th team								

== Rankings ==
		Pre	Wk 2	Wk 3	Wk 4	Wk 5	Wk 6	Wk 7	Wk 8	Wk 9	Wk 10	Wk 11	Wk 12	Wk 13	Wk 14	Wk 15	Final
Illinois	AP	RV	RV														
Illinois	C	RV	RV									RV	RV	RV			
Illinois	CFP	Not released															
Indiana	AP	6 (8)	5 (8)	4 (3)	5 (4)	6 (1)	7 (1)	5 (1)	6	4	6	6	6	12			
Indiana	C	6 (14)	5 (11)	4 (10)	4 (9)	5 (8)	5 (8)	4 (9)	6	4	3	5 (2)	5 (3)	12			
Indiana	CFP	Not released									4	9	8				
Iowa	AP	22	21	18	17	14	20	17	15	RV	21	16	13	13			
Iowa	C	22	21	20	17	14	18	16	14	24	20	15	13	13			
Iowa	CFP	Not released									19	15	15				
Maryland	AP																
Maryland	C																
Maryland	CFP	Not released															
Michigan	AP	16	RV	19	18	RV											
Michigan	C	16	24	19	18	24				RV							
Michigan	CFP	Not released															
Michigan State	AP																
Michigan State	C																
Michigan State	CFP	Not released															
Minnesota	AP	RV	RV			RV	RV			RV	RV						
Minnesota	C		RV			RV	RV			RV	RV	RV		RV			
Minnesota	CFP	Not released															
Nebraska	AP				RV	RV	RV	RV						RV			
Nebraska	C	RV	RV	RV	RV	RV	RV	RV	RV	RV	RV		RV	RV			
Nebraska	CFP	Not released															
Northwestern	AP					RV	RV	25	24	20t	RV						
Northwestern	C				RV	RV	RV	RV	23	18	23	RV	RV				
Northwestern	CFP	Not released															
Ohio State	AP	1 (40)	1 (46)	6	7	5	5	4	3 (9)	2 (10)	11	21	16	25			
Ohio State	C	1 (38)	1 (50)	6	7	6	6	5 (1)	2 (13)	2 (6)	10	20	17	RV			
Ohio State	CFP	Not released									12	20	14				
Oregon	AP	2 (14)	6 (3)	21	20	15	13	RV	RV		RV	18	14	14			
Oregon	C	2 (6)	6 (1)	18	16	15	13	25	25	RV	RV	19	14	14			
Oregon	CFP	Not released									23	16	13				
Penn State	AP	18	16	14	13	RV											
Penn State	C	17	16	15	14	22											
Penn State	CFP	Not released															
Purdue	AP																
Purdue	C																
Purdue	CFP	Not released															
Rutgers	AP																
Rutgers	C																
Rutgers	CFP	Not released															
UCLA	AP		RV	RV	RV	23	21	12	9	7	5	4	4	10			
UCLA	C		RV	RV	RV	23	22	12	10	7	5	4 (1)	4	10			
UCLA	CFP	Not released									8	4	4				
USC	AP	14t	14	12	12	18	19	19	16	RV	18	15	18	15			
USC	C	14	14	11	12	18	17	15	15	25	17	14	19	15			
USC	CFP	Not released									20	18	18				
Washington	AP	17	19	RV	RV									RV			
Washington	C	19	19	24	23	RV								RV			
Washington	CFP	Not released															
Wisconsin	AP					RV	RV	RV		25							
Wisconsin	C					RV	RV	RV	RV	RV	RV	RV		RV			
Wisconsin	CFP	Not released															

Legend
	Improvement in ranking
	Drop in ranking
	Not ranked previous week
	No change in ranking from previous week
RV	Received votes but were not ranked in Top 25 of poll
т	Tied with team above or below also with this symbol

== Schedule ==
Index to colors and formatting
Big Ten member won
Big Ten member lost
Big Ten teams in **bold**

=== Regular season schedule ===
==== Week 0 ====
Date	Time	Visiting team	Home team	Site	TV	Result	Attendance	Ref.
August 29	3:00 p.m.	San Jose State	No. 14t **USC**	Los Angeles Memorial Coliseum • Los Angeles, CA	NBC	**W** 42–26	51,144	
^{#}Rankings from AP Poll released prior to game. All times are in Eastern Time.

==== Week 1 ====
Date	Time	Visiting team	Home team	Site	TV	Result	Attendance	Ref.
September 3	6:00 p.m.	UMass	**Rutgers**	SHI Stadium • Piscataway, NJ	BTN	**L** 21–37	42,454	
September 3	8:00 p.m.	Eastern Illinois	**Minnesota**	Huntington Bank Stadium • Minneapolis, MN	Peacock/NBCSN	**W** 59–7	41,048	
September 3	9:00 p.m.	UAB	**Illinois**	Memorial Stadium • Champaign, IL	BTN	**W** 42–23	52,673	
September 4	7:00 p.m.	Indiana State	**Purdue**	Ross-Ade Stadium • West Lafayette, IN	BTN	**W** 44–19	49,019	
September 4	8:00 p.m.	Toledo	**Michigan State**	Spartan Stadium • East Lansing, MI	FS1	**W** 30–20	72,083	
September 4	9:00 p.m.	Fresno State	No. 14t **USC**	Los Angeles Memorial Coliseum • Los Angeles, CA	FOX	**W** 39–0	53,014	
September 5	12:00 p.m.	North Texas	No. 6 **Indiana**	Memorial Stadium • Bloomington, IN	FOX	**W** 52-16	54,493	
September 5	12:00 p.m.	Ohio	**Nebraska**	Memorial Stadium • Lincoln, NE	FS1	**W** 49-21	85,577	
September 5	12:30 p.m.	Ball State	No. 1 **Ohio State**	Ohio Stadium • Columbus, OH	BTN	**W** 56-3	101,120	
September 5	3:30 p.m.	Boise State	No. 2 **Oregon**	Autzen Stadium • Eugene, OR	CBS	**W** 34-27	57,652	
September 5	3:30 p.m.	Marshall	No. 18 **Penn State**	Beaver Stadium • University Park, PA	FS1	**W** 45-0	108,489	
September 5	4:15 p.m.	Northern Illinois	No. 22 **Iowa**	Kinnick Stadium • Iowa City, IA	BTN	**W** 40-0	69,250	
September 5	7:30 p.m.	Western Michigan	No. 16 **Michigan**	Michigan Stadium • Ann Arbor, MI	NBC	**W** 13-12	110,879	
September 5	8:00 p.m.	No. 2 (FCS) South Dakota State	**Northwestern**	Martin Stadium • Evanston, IL	BTN	**W** 34-18	9,574	
September 5	8:00 p.m.	Hampton	**Maryland**	SECU Stadium • College Park, MD	BTN	**W** 62-0	43,421	
September 5	10:30 p.m.	**UCLA**	California	California Memorial Stadium • Berkeley, CA (Cal–UCLA rivalry)	ESPN	**W** 45-24	62,467	
September 6	4:00 p.m.	Washington State	No. 17 **Washington**	Husky Stadium • Seattle, WA (Apple Cup)	NBC	**W** 24-10	71,056	
September 6	7:30 p.m.	**Wisconsin**	No. 4 Notre Dame	Lambeau Field • Green Bay, WI (Shamrock Series)	NBC	**L** 13-41	75,939	
^{#}Rankings from AP Poll released prior to game. All times are in Eastern Time.

==== Week 2 ====
Date	Time	Visiting team	Home team	Site	TV	Result	Attendance	Ref.
September 11	7:30 p.m.	**Rutgers**	Boston College	Alumni Stadium • Chestnut Hill, MA	ESPN2	**L** 21-28	40,611	
September 12	12:00 p.m.	No. 11 Oklahoma	**Michigan**	Michigan Stadium • Ann Arbor, MI	FOX	**W** 17–10	111,240	
September 12	12:00 p.m.	Wake Forest	**Purdue**	Ross-Ade Stadium • West Lafayette, IN	FS1	**L** 36–38^{2OT}	50,363	
September 12	12:00 p.m.	No. 6 **Oregon**	Oklahoma State	Boone Pickens Stadium • Stillwater, OK	ESPN	**L** 31-39	51,035	
September 12	12:00 p.m.	No. 16 **Penn State**	Temple	Lincoln Financial Field • Philadelphia, PA	ESPN2	**W** 27–9	61,714	
September 12	12:00 p.m.	Howard	No. 5 **Indiana**	Memorial Stadium • Bloomington, IN	BTN	**W** 55–0	54,376	
September 12	3:30 p.m.	Mississippi State	**Minnesota**	Huntington Bank Stadium • Minneapolis, MN	CBS	**L** 13-38	48,048	
September 12	3:30 p.m.	Duke	**Illinois**	Memorial Stadium • Champaign, IL	FS1	**L** 27-31	60,670	
September 12	3:30 p.m.	Utah State	No. 19 **Washington**	Husky Stadium • Seattle, WA	BTN	**W** 16-14	62,152	
September 12	3:30 p.m.	Eastern Michigan	**Michigan State**	Spartan Stadium • East Lansing, MI	BTN	**W** 35-7	70,712	
September 12	3:30 p.m.	**Maryland**	UConn	Pratt & Whitney Stadium at Rentschler Field • East Hartford, CT	CBSSN	**W** 38-14	34,494	
September 12	7:00 p.m.	Bowling Green	**Nebraska**	Memorial Stadium • Lincoln, NE	FS1	**W** 56-7	86,193	
September 12	7:15 p.m.	San Diego State	**UCLA**	Rose Bowl • Pasadena, CA	BTN	**W** 28-10	31,975	
September 12	7:15 p.m.	Western Illinois	**Wisconsin**	Camp Randall Stadium • Madison, WI	BTN	**W** 36-9	65,274	
September 12	7:30 p.m.	No. 1 **Ohio State**	No. 4 Texas	Darrell K Royal–Texas Memorial Stadium • Austin, TX	ABC	**L** 23-24	105,044	
September 12	7:30 p.m.	Iowa State	No. 21 **Iowa**	Kinnick Stadium • Iowa City, IA (Cy-Hawk Trophy)	NBC	**W** 16-13	69,250	
September 12	11:00 p.m.	Louisiana	No. 14 **USC**	Los Angeles Memorial Coliseum • Los Angeles, CA	BTN	**W** 49-30	60,019	
^{#}Rankings from AP Poll released prior to game. All times are in Eastern Time.

Date	Bye Week
September 12	Northwestern

==== Week 3 ====
Date	Time	Visiting team	Home team	Site	TV	Result	Attendance	Ref.
September 18	10:30 p.m.	Portland State	No. 21 **Oregon**	Autzen Stadium • Eugene, OR	BTN	**W** 84–0	58,114	
September 19	12:00 p.m.	Kent State	No. 6 **Ohio State**	Ohio Stadium • Columbus, OH	FOX	**W** 59–3	100,009	
September 19	12:00 p.m.	Akron	**Minnesota**	Huntington Bank Stadium • Minneapolis, MN	BTN	**W** 41–7	40,168	
September 19	12:00 p.m.	Buffalo	No. 14 **Penn State**	Beaver Stadium • University Park, PA	BTN	**W** 55–13	103,817	
September 19	12:30 p.m.	Eastern Michigan	**Wisconsin**	Camp Randall Stadium • Madison, WI	Peacock/NBCSN	**W** 54–10	66,545	
September 19	2:00 p.m.	No. 24 (FCS) Southern Illinois	**Illinois**	Memorial Stadium • Champaign, IL	Peacock	**W** 48–10	60,670	
September 19	3:30 p.m.	No. 12 **USC**	**Rutgers**	SHI Stadium • Piscataway, NJ	CBS	**USC** 42–35	43,045	
September 19	3:30 p.m.	UTEP	No. 19 **Michigan**	Michigan Stadium • Ann Arbor, MI	BTN	**W** 52–17	110,668	
September 19	4:00 p.m.	Northern Iowa	No. 18 **Iowa**	Kinnick Stadium • Iowa City, IA	FS1	**W** 55–0	69,250	
September 19	4:00 p.m.	Western Kentucky	No. 4 **Indiana**	Memorial Stadium • Bloomington, IN	Peacock/NBCSN	**W** 38–0	54,695	
September 19	7:15 p.m.	North Dakota	**Nebraska**	Memorial Stadium • Lincoln, NE	BTN	**W** 34–7	86,217	
September 19	7:15 p.m.	Eastern Washington	**Washington**	Husky Stadium • Seattle, WA	BTN	**W** 48–16	61,619	
September 19	7:30 p.m.	**Michigan State**	No. 3 Notre Dame	Notre Dame Stadium • Notre Dame, IN (Megaphone Trophy)	NBC	**L** 10–27	77,622	
September 19	7:30 p.m.	Colorado	**Northwestern**	Martin Stadium • Evanston, IL	FOX	**W** 41–7	12,023	
September 19	7:30 p.m.	Virginia Tech	**Maryland**	SECU Stadium • College Park, MD	FS1	**L** 26–35	46,185	
September 19	11:00 p.m.	**Purdue**	**UCLA**	Rose Bowl • Pasadena, CA	BTN	**UCLA** 52–38	30,916	
^{#}Rankings from AP Poll released prior to game. All times are in Eastern Time.

==== Week 4 ====
Date	Time	Visiting team	Home team	Site	TV	Result	Attendance	Ref.
September 25	7:00 p.m.	Howard	**Rutgers**	SHI Stadium • Piscataway, NJ	BTN	**W** 58–7	34,466	
September 25	8:00 p.m.	**Northwestern**	No. 5 **Indiana**	Memorial Stadium • Bloomington, IN	FOX	**IU** 29–23	54,593	
September 26	12:00 p.m.	**Illinois**	No. 7 **Ohio State**	Ohio Stadium • Columbus, OH (Illibuck)	FOX	**OSU** 42–19	101,452	
September 26	1:30 p.m.	**UCLA**	**Maryland**	SECU Stadium • College Park, MD	BTN	**UCLA** 54–3	40,125	
September 26	2:00 p.m.	No. 3 Notre Dame	**Purdue**	Ross-Ade Stadium • West Lafayette, IN (Shillelagh Trophy)	Peacock/NBCSN	**L** 10–49	52,273	
September 26	3:30 p.m.	No. 17 **Iowa**	No. 18 **Michigan**	Michigan Stadium • Ann Arbor, MI	CBS	**IOWA** 20–19	111,126	
September 26†	5:00 p.m.	**Wisconsin**	No. 13 **Penn State**	Beaver Stadium • University Park, PA	Peacock/NBCSN	**WIS** 24–20	108,014	
September 26	5:00 p.m.	**Nebraska**	**Michigan State**	Spartan Stadium • East Lansing, MI	BTN	**NEB** 31–13	68,161	
September 26	7:30 p.m.	No. 20 **Oregon**	No. 12 **USC**	L.A. Memorial Coliseum • Los Angeles, CA (ORE-USC rivalry)	NBC	**ORE** 41–27	75,500	
September 26	11:00 p.m.	**Minnesota**	**Washington**	Husky Stadium • Seattle, WA	FOX	**MINN** 27–24	63,323	
^{†}Homecoming. ^{#}Rankings from AP Poll released prior to game. All times are in Eastern Time.

==== Week 5 ====
Date	Time	Visiting team	Home team	Site	TV	Result	Attendance	Ref.
October 2	8:00 p.m.	**Penn State**	**Northwestern**	Ryan Field • Evanston, IL	FOX	**NW** 34-13	35,000	
October 3	12:00 p.m.	**Michigan**	**Minnesota**	Huntington Bank Stadium • Minneapolis, MN (Little Brown Jug)	FOX	**MIN** 20-14	51,012	
October 3†	12:30 p.m.	**Michigan State**	**Wisconsin**	Camp Randall Stadium • Madison, WI	BTN	**WIS** 31-3	67,001	
October 3	3:30 p.m.	No. 5 **Ohio State**	No. 14 **Iowa**	Kinnick Stadium • Iowa City, IA	CBS	**OSU** 31-14	69,250	
October 3†	4:00 p.m.	**Maryland**	**Nebraska**	Memorial Stadium • Lincoln, NE	FS1	**NEB** 48-23	85,033	
October 3†	4:15 p.m.	**Purdue**	**Illinois**	Memorial Stadium • Champaign, IL (Purdue Cannon)	BTN	**PUR** 24-17	60,670	
October 3†	7:30 p.m.	**Washington**	No. 18 **USC**	L.A. Memorial Coliseum • Los Angeles, CA	NBC	**USC** 25-21	59,136	
October 3†	8:00 p.m.	No. 6 **Indiana**	**Rutgers**	SHI Stadium • Piscataway, NJ	BTN	**IU** 47-15	48,650	
^{†}Homecoming. ^{#}Rankings from AP Poll released prior to game. All times are in Eastern Time.

Date	Bye Week	
October 3	#15 Oregon	#23 UCLA

==== Week 6 ====
Date	Time	Visiting team	Home team	Site	TV	Result	Attendance	Ref.
October 9	9:00 p.m.	No. 20 **Iowa**	**Washington**	Husky Stadium • Seattle, WA	FOX	**IOWA** 41–24	66,231	
October 10	12:00 p.m.	No. 7 **Indiana**	**Nebraska**	Memorial Stadium • Lincoln, NE	FOX	**IU** 20–17	85,653	
October 10†	12:30 p.m.	Ball State	**Northwestern**	Ryan Field • Evanston, IL	BTN	**W** 45–14	25,629	
October 10	3:30 p.m.	No. 21 **UCLA**	No. 13 **Oregon**	Autzen Stadium • Eugene, OR	CBS	**UCLA** 17–15	59,262	
October 10†	3:30 p.m.	**Illinois**	**Michigan State**	Spartan Stadium • East Lansing, MI	FS1	**Ill** 38–37 ^{OT}	65,837	
October 10†	4:15 p.m.	**Maryland**	No. 5 **Ohio State**	Ohio Stadium • Columbus, OH	BTN	**OSU** 45–16	102,589	
October 10	7:30 p.m.	No. 19 **USC**	**Penn State**	Beaver Stadium • University Park, PA	NBC	**USC** 31–23	114,419	
October 10	8:00 p.m.	**Minnesota**	**Purdue**	Ross-Ade Stadium • West Lafayette, IN	BTN	**PUR** 41-13	48,559	
^{†}Homecoming. ^{#}Rankings from AP Poll released prior to game. All times are in Eastern Time.

Date	Bye Week		
October 10	Michigan	Rutgers	Wisconsin

==== Week 7 ====
Date	Time	Visiting team	Home team	Site	TV	Result	Attendance	Ref.
October 16	8:00 p.m.	**Washington**	**Purdue**	Ross-Ade Stadium • West Lafayette, IN	FOX	**WAS** 38-26	50,941	
October 17	12:00 p.m.	No. 4 **Ohio State**	No. 5 **Indiana**	Memorial Stadium • Bloomington, IN	FOX	**OSU** 19-15	54,532	
October 17	12:00 p.m.	No. 25 **Northwestern**	**Michigan State**	Spartan Stadium • East Lansing, MI	Peacock/NBCSN	**NW** 24-21	67,423	
October 17†	12:30 p.m.	**Rutgers**	**Maryland**	SECU Stadium • College Park, MD	BTN	**RUT** 37-30	39,326	
October 17†	3:30 p.m.	**Penn State**	**Michigan**	Michigan Stadium • Ann Arbor, MI	CBS	**MICH** 21-18	110,731	
October 17	7:30 p.m.	**Wisconsin**	No. 12 **UCLA**	Rose Bowl • Pasadena, CA	NBC	**UCLA** 17-7	36,045	
October 17	11:00 p.m.	**Nebraska**	**Oregon**	Autzen Stadium • Eugene, OR	FOX	**ORE** 17-14	58,391	
^{†}Homecoming. ^{#}Rankings from AP Poll released prior to game. All times are in Eastern Time.

Date	Bye Week			
October 17	Illinois	#17 Iowa	Minnesota	#19 USC

==== Week 8 ====
Date	Time	Visiting team	Home team	Site	TV	Result	Attendance	Ref.
October 24	12:00 p.m.	No. 6 **Indiana**	**Michigan**	Michigan Stadium • Ann Arbor, MI	FOX	**IU** 13-6 ^{OT}	111,276	
October 24	12:00 p.m.	**Rutgers**	No. 24 **Northwestern**	Ryan Field • Evanston, IL	Peacock	**NW** 42-14	27,156	
October 24	3:00 p.m.	**Oregon**	**Illinois**	Memorial Stadium • Champaign, IL	BTN	**ILL** 21-10	58,723	
October 24†	3:30 p.m.	**Michigan State**	No. 9 **UCLA**	Rose Bowl • Pasadena, CA	CBS	**UCLA** 28-10	33,757	
October 24†	3:30 p.m.	No. 15 **Iowa**	**Minnesota**	Huntington Bank Stadium • Minneapolis, MN (Floyd of Rosedale)	FS1	**MIN** 13-10	53,004	
October 24	7:30 p.m.	No. 16 **USC**	**Wisconsin**	Camp Randall Stadium • Madison, WI	NBC	**WIS** 24-7	71,750	
^{†}Homecoming. ^{#}Rankings from AP Poll released prior to game. All times are in Eastern Time.

Date	Bye Week					
October 24	Maryland	Nebraska	#3 Ohio State	Penn State	Purdue	Washington

==== Week 9 ====
Date	Time	Visiting team	Home team	Site	TV	Result	Attendance	Ref.
October 31†	12:00 p.m.	No. 25 **Wisconsin**	**Iowa**	Kinnick Stadium • Iowa City, IA (Heartland Trophy)	FOX	**IOWA** 30–0	69,250	
October 31	12:00 p.m.	**Illinois**	**Maryland**	SECU Stadium • College Park, MD	FS1	**ILL** 20–17	27,207	
October 31	12:30 p.m.	**Michigan**	**Rutgers**	SHI Stadium • Piscataway, NJ	BTN	**MICH** 28–21	39,540	
October 31†	3:30 p.m.	**Minnesota**	No. 4 **Indiana**	Memorial Stadium • Bloomington, IN	CBS	**IU** 23–16 ^{OT}	54,400	
October 31†	3:30 p.m.	No. 20t **Northwestern**	**Oregon**	Autzen Stadium • Eugene, OR	Peacock/NBCSN	**ORE** 34–26	55,673	
October 31	4:15 p.m.	**Purdue**	**Penn State**	Beaver Stadium • University Park, PA	BTN	**PSU** 31–17	102,041	
October 31	4:15 p.m.	Nevada	No. 7 **UCLA**	Rose Bowl • Pasadena, CA	BTN	**W** 27–0	24,611	
October 31	7:30 p.m.	No. 2 **Ohio State**	**USC**	L.A. Memorial Coliseum • Los Angeles, CA	NBC	**USC** 30–18	70,810	
October 31	8:00 p.m.	**Washington**	**Nebraska**	Memorial Stadium • Lincoln, NE	BTN	**WASH** 17–10	86,097	
^{†}Homecoming. ^{#}Rankings from AP Poll released prior to game. All times are in Eastern Time.

Date	Bye Week
October 31	Michigan State

==== Week 10 ====
Date	Time	Visiting team	Home team	Site	TV	Result	Attendance	Ref.
November 6	8:00 p.m.	**Nebraska**	**Illinois**	Memorial Stadium • Champaign, IL	FOX	**ILL** 24-13	58,587	
November 7	12:00 p.m.	No. 5 **UCLA**	**Minnesota**	Huntington Bank Stadium • Minneapolis, MN	FOX	**UCLA** 34-20	43,841	
November 7†	12:30 p.m.	**Maryland**	**Purdue**	Ross-Ade Stadium • West Lafayette, IN	BTN	**MD** 34-29	51,929	
November 7	3:30 p.m.	**Oregon**	No. 11 **Ohio State**	Ohio Stadium • Columbus, OH	CBS	**ORE** 41–28	103,551	
November 7†	3:30 p.m.	**Penn State**	**Washington**	Husky Stadium • Seattle, WA	FS1	**PSU** 28–25	67,869	
November 7	4:15 p.m.	**Rutgers**	**Wisconsin**	Camp Randall Stadium • Madison, WI	BTN	**WIS** 31–10	66,310	
November 7	7:30 p.m.	No. 21 **Iowa**	**Northwestern**	Ryan Field • Evanston, IL	FOX	**IA** 24-10	31,151	
November 7	7:30 p.m.	**Michigan State**	**Michigan**	Michigan Stadium • Ann Arbor, MI (Paul Bunyan Trophy)	Peacock/NBCSN	**MSU** 15-6	111,172	
^{†}Homecoming. ^{#}Rankings from AP Poll released prior to game. All times are in Eastern Time.

Date	Bye Week	
November 7	#6 Indiana	#18 USC

==== Week 11 ====
Date	Time	Visiting team	Home team	Site	TV	Result	Attendance	Ref.
November 13	9:00 p.m.	**Illinois**	No. 4 **UCLA**	Rose Bowl • Pasadena, CA	FOX	**UCLA** 22–14	45,800	
November 14	12:00 p.m.	**Northwestern**	No. 21 **Ohio State**	Ohio Stadium • Columbus, OH	FOX	**OSU** 28-19	101,256	
November 14	12:00 p.m.	**Wisconsin**	**Maryland**	SECU Stadium • College Park, MD	FS1	**MD** 24-21	28,885	
November 14	12:30 p.m.	**Nebraska**	**Rutgers**	SHI Stadium • Piscataway, NJ	BTN	**NEB** 31-0	36,425	
November 14	3:30 p.m.	No. 15 **USC**	No. 6 **Indiana**	Memorial Stadium • Bloomington, IN	CBS	**IU** 27–13	54,336	
November 14	3:30 p.m.	**Michigan**	No. 18 **Oregon**	Autzen Stadium • Eugene, OR	FOX/FS1	**ORE** 31–7	58,183	
November 14	5:30 p.m.	**Washington**	**Michigan State**	Spartan Stadium • East Lansing, MI	BTN	**WASH** 21–14	60,275	
November 14	7:00 p.m.	**Minnesota**	**Penn State**	Beaver Stadium • University Park, PA	FS1	**PSU** 42–14	105,291	
November 14	7:30 p.m.	**Purdue**	No. 16 **Iowa**	Kinnick Stadium • Iowa City, IA	NBC	**IA** 28–7	69,250	
^{#}Rankings from AP Poll released prior to game. All times are in Eastern Time.

==== Week 12 ====
Date	Time	Visiting team	Home team	Site	TV	Result	Attendance	Ref.
November 20	8:00 p.m.	No. 14 **Oregon**	**Michigan State**	Spartan Stadium • East Lansing, MI	FOX	**ORE** 45-7	61,331	
November 21	12:00 p.m.	No. 16 **Ohio State**	**Nebraska**	Memorial Stadium • Lincoln, NE	FOX	**NEB** 31-28	85,699	
November 21	12:00 p.m.	**Wisconsin**	**Purdue**	Ross-Ade Stadium • West Lafayette, IN	NBC	**WIS** 42-10	45,426	
November 21	12:00 p.m.	**Northwestern**	**Minnesota**	Huntington Bank Stadium • Minneapolis, MN	FS1	**MIN** 20-17	39,371	
November 21	2:30 p.m.	No. 13 **Iowa**	**Illinois**	Memorial Stadium • Champaign, IL	BTN	**IA** 34-17	60,670	
November 21	3:30 p.m.	No. 4 **UCLA**	**Michigan**	Michigan Stadium • Ann Arbor, MI	CBS	**MICH** 18-16 ^{3OT}	109,618	
November 21	3:30 p.m.	No. 6 **Indiana**	**Washington**	Husky Stadium • Seattle, WA	Peacock/NBCSN	**WASH** 27-24 ^{OT}	64,614	
November 21	3:30 p.m.	**Rutgers**	**Penn State**	Beaver Stadium • University Park, PA	FS1	**RUT** 25-24	106,200	
November 21	6:15 p.m.	**Maryland**	No. 18 **USC**	L.A. Memorial Coliseum • Los Angeles, CA	BTN	**USC** 35-21	53,694	
^{#}Rankings from AP Poll released prior to game. All times are in Eastern Time.

==== Week 13 ====
Date	Time	Visiting team	Home team	Site	TV	Result	Attendance	Ref.
November 27	12:00 p.m.	**Nebraska**	No. 13 **Iowa**	Kinnick Stadium • Iowa City, IA (Heroes Game)	CBS			
November 27	7:30 p.m.	**Minnesota**	**Wisconsin**	Camp Randall Stadium • Madison, WI (Paul Bunyan's Axe)	NBC			
November 28	12:00 p.m.	**Michigan**	No. 25 **Ohio State**	Ohio Stadium • Columbus, OH (The Game)	FOX			
November 28	12:30 p.m.	**Illinois**	**Northwestern**	Ryan Field • Evanston, IL (Land of Lincoln Trophy)	BTN			
November 28	3:30 p.m.	No. 15 **USC**	No. 10 **UCLA**	Rose Bowl • Pasadena, CA (Victory Bell)	CBS			
November 28	3:30 p.m.	**Penn State**	**Maryland**	SECU Stadium • College Park, MD (MD–PSU rivalry)	FS1			
November 28	4:15 p.m.	**Michigan State**	**Rutgers**	SHI Stadium • Piscataway, NJ	BTN			
November 28	7:00 p.m.	**Purdue**	No. 12 **Indiana**	Memorial Stadium • Bloomington, IN (Old Oaken Bucket)	FS1			
November 28	7:30 p.m.	**Washington**	No. 14 **Oregon**	Autzen Stadium • Eugene, OR (ORE–WAS rivalry)	NBC			
^{#}Rankings from AP Poll released prior to game. All times are in Eastern Time.

==== Big Ten Championship Game ====
Date	Time	Visiting team	Home team	Site	TV	Result	Attendance	Ref.
December 5	8:00 p.m.			Lucas Oil Stadium • Indianapolis, IN (Big Ten Championship Game)	FOX			
^{#}Rankings from AP Poll released prior to game. All times are in Eastern Time.

== Big Ten records vs other conferences ==
2026 records against non-conference foes

Through Oct. 31

Power 4 conferences	Record
ACC	1–4
Big 12	2-1
Notre Dame	0–3
SEC	1-2
Power 4 total	4-10
Other FBS conferences	Record
American	3–0
CUSA	1–0
Independents (Excluding Notre Dame)	1–0
MAC	11–1
Mountain West	4–0
Pac-12	5–0
Sun Belt	2–0
Other FBS total	27–1
FCS opponents	Record
Football Championship Subdivision	12–0
Total non-conference record	43-11

Post season

Power 4 conferences	Record
ACC	0–0
Big 12	0–0
Notre Dame	0–0
SEC	0–0
Power 4 total	0–0
Other FBS conferences	Record
American	0–0
CUSA	0–0
Independents (Excluding Notre Dame)	0–0
MAC	0–0
Mountain West	0–0
Pac-12	0–0
Sun Belt	0–0
Other FBS total	0–0
Total bowl record	0–0

== Awards and honors ==
=== Player of the Week Honors ===
Week	Offensive			Defensive			Special Teams			Freshman		
Week	Player	Position	Team	Player	Position	Team	Player	Position	Team	Player	Position	Team
Week 1 (September 7)	Jayden Maiava	QB	USC	Caleb Bacon	DE	PSU	Javon Tracy	WR/PR	MIN	Jamal Rule	RB	NEB
Week 1 (September 7)	Jayden Maiava	QB	USC	Ta'Shawn James	DB	UCLA	Javon Tracy	WR/PR	MIN	Jamal Rule	RB	NEB
Week 2 (September 14)	Anthony Colandrea	QB	NEB	John Henry Daley	DE	MICH	Caden Buhr	PK	IA	Mark Bowman	TE	USC
Week 3 (September 21)	Aidan Chiles	QB	NW	Sammy Omosigho	LB	UCLA	Caden Chittenden	K	USC	Riley Wormley	RB	USC
Week 4 (September 28)	Jeremiah Smith	WR	OSU	Maverick Baranowski	LB	MIN	Luke Drzewiecki	K	MIN	Braeden Jackson	RB	IA
Week 5 (October 5)	Jeremiah Smith	WR	OSU	Braydon Brus	LB	NW	Jacobo Echeverria Lozano	K	PUR	Luke Wafle	DE	USC
Week 5 (October 5)	Colton Joseph	QB	WIS	Braydon Brus	LB	NW	Jacobo Echeverria Lozano	K	PUR	Luke Wafle	DE	USC
Week 6 (October 12)	Fame Ijeboi	RB	PUR	Jalen Woods	LB	UCLA	Ethan Moczulski	K	ILL	Trent Mosley	WR	USC
Week 7 (October 19)	KJ Duff	WR	RUT	Chris Bracy	S	MICH	Gage Hurych	K	ORE	Jay Timmons	CB	OSU
Week 8 (October 26)	Aidan Chiles	QB	NW	Sebastian Cheeks	LB	WIS	Luke Drzewiecki	K	MIN	Michael Clayton II	QB	ILL
Week 9 (November 2)	Hank Brown	QB	IA	Alex McLaughlin	S	WASH	Paddy McAteer	K	IU	Tommy Carr	QB	MICH
Week 9 (November 2)	Hank Brown	QB	IA	Alex McLaughlin	S	WASH	Luke Drzewiecki	K	MIN	Tommy Carr	QB	MICH
Week 10 (November 9)	Ty Dieffenbach	QB	UCLA	NiJhay Burt	CB	MSU	Liam Boyd	K	MSU	Ryan Hopkins	QB	WIS
Week 10 (November 16)	Dylan Raiola	QB	ORE	Preston Zachman	DB	IU	Sean O'Haire	K	MD	Luke Fahey	QB	OSU
Week 10 (November 16)	Dylan Raiola	QB	ORE	Scooter Jackson	CB	UCLA	Sean O'Haire	K	MD	Luke Fahey	QB	OSU

== Television selections ==
The Big Ten Conference has television contracts with FOX, NBC and CBS which allow games to be broadcast across FOX, CBS, NBC, FS1, and Big Ten Network. Streaming broadcasts for games under Big Ten control are streamed on Fox One, Paramount+ and Peacock. Games under the control of other conferences fall under the contracts of the opposing conference.

Network	Wk 0	Wk 1	Wk 2	Wk 3	Wk 4	Wk 5	Wk 6	Wk 7	Wk 8	Wk 9	Wk 10	Wk 11	Wk 12	Wk 13	Wk 14	C	Bowls	NCG	Totals
ABC	–	–	1	–	–	–	–	–	–	–	–	–	–	–	–	–	–	–	1
ESPN	–	1	1	–	–	–	–	–	–	–	–	–	–	–	–	–	–	–	2
ESPN2	–	–	2	–	–	–	–	–	–	–	–	–	–	–	–	–	–	–	2
ESPNU	–	–	–	–	–	–	–	–	–	–	–	–	–	–	–	–	–	–	–
FOX	–	2	1	2	3	2	2	3	1	1	3	3	2	1	–	1	–	–	
FS1	–	3	3	2	–	1	1	–	1	1	1	3	2	2	–	–	–	–	
FS2	–	–	–	–	–	–	–	–	–	–	–	–	–	–	–	–	–	–	–
CBS	–	1	1	1	1	1	1	1	1	1	1	1	1	2	–	–	–	–	14
NBC	1	3	1	1	1	1	1	1	1	1	–	1	1	2	–	–	–	–	16
The CW	–	–	–	–	–	–	–	–	–	–	–	–	–	–	–	–	–	–	–
CBS Sports Network	–	–	1	–	–	–	–	–	–	–	–	–	–	–	–	–	–	–	1
Big Ten Network	–	7	6	7	3	3	3	1	1	4	2	2	2	2	–	–	–	–	
TNT (TruTV, TBS)	–	–	–	–	–	–	–	–	–	–	–	–	–	–	–	–	–	–	–
Peacock (streaming)	–	1	–	3	2	–	–	1	1	1	1	–	1	–	–	–	–	–	11
HBO Max (streaming)	–	–	–	–	–	–	–	–	–	–	–	–	–	–	–	–	–	–	–

Platform	Games
Broadcast	0
Cable	0
Streaming	0
