= 2026 Wisconsin Badgers football team =

American college football season

2026 Wisconsin Badgers football
- Conference: Big Ten Conference
- Record: 7–4 (5–3 Big Ten)
- Head coach: Luke Fickell (4th season)
- Offensive coordinator: Jeff Grimes (2nd season)
- Offensive scheme: Multiple
- Defensive coordinator: Mike Tressel (4th season)
- Base defense: 4–2–5
- Home stadium: Camp Randall Stadium

Uniform
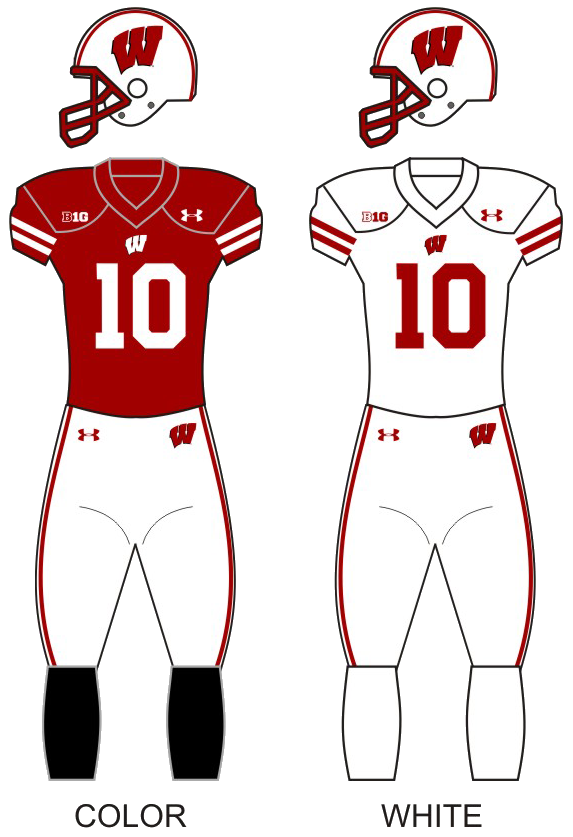

2026 Big Ten Conference football standings
	Conf.			Overall
Team	W		L	W		L
No. 4 UCLA	7	–	0	10	–	0
No. 8 Indiana	6	–	1	9	–	1
No. 13 Oregon	6	–	2	8	–	3
No. 15 Iowa	5	–	2	8	–	2
No. 14 Ohio State	5	–	3	7	–	4
Wisconsin	5	–	3	7	–	4
No. 18 USC	4	–	3	7	–	3
Illinois	4	–	3	6	–	4
Nebraska	4	–	4	7	–	4
Minnesota	4	–	4	6	–	5
Penn State	3	–	4	6	–	4
Washington	3	–	4	6	–	4
Northwestern	3	–	5	6	–	5
Maryland	2	–	5	4	–	6
Michigan	2	–	5	5	–	5
Purdue	2	–	6	3	–	8
Rutgers	1	–	6	2	–	8
Michigan State	1	–	7	3	–	8
Championship: December 5, 2026
^ – College Football Playoff participant; $ – Conference champion; y – Championship game participant; As of November 21, 2026; Rankings from CFP rankings

The 2026 Wisconsin Badgers football team represents the University of Wisconsin–Madison as a member of the Big Ten Conference during the 2026 NCAA Division I FBS football season. The Badgers are led by fourth-year head coach Luke Fickell and play their home games at Camp Randall Stadium located in Madison, Wisconsin.

== Offseason ==
=== 2026 NFL draft ===
For the first time since 1978, the Badgers did not have a player get selected in the NFL Draft, a streak of 47 seasons.

Round	Pick	Player	Position	NFL club
Undrafted
Undrafted		Jackson Acker	FB/TE	Buffalo Bills
Undrafted		Vinny Anthony II	WR	Atlanta Falcons
Undrafted		Ben Barten	DT	New York Giants
Undrafted		Austin Brown	S	Indianapolis Colts
Undrafted		Nyzier Fourqurean	CB	Los Angeles Rams
Undrafted		Ricardo Hallman	CB	Denver Broncos
Undrafted		Riley Mahlman	OT	Atlanta Falcons
Undrafted		Lance Mason	TE	Seattle Seahawks
Undrafted		Parker Petersen	DL	Carolina Panthers
Undrafted		Darryl Peterson III	LB	Los Angeles Rams
Undrafted		Mason Reiger	LB	Miami Dolphins
Undrafted		Jay'viar Suggs	DT	New Orleans Saints

=== Coaching changes ===
2026 Wisconsin Badgers coaching staff changes
Position	Previous coach(es)	Vacancy reason	Replacement(s)	Source(s)
Special teams coordinator	Matt Mitchell, 2023–2025	Promoted to Associate head coach	Bob Ligashesky	
Offensive line coach	A. J. Blazek, 2024–2025	Mutual agreement	Eric Mateos	
Running backs coach	Devon Spalding, 2023–2025	Hired by Michigan State	Jayden Everett	
Wide receivers coach	Jordan Reid, 2025	Hired by Atlanta Falcons	Ari Confesor	
Insider linebackers coach	Mike Tressel, 2023–2025	Title removed	Tuf Borland	
Cornerbacks coach	Paul Haynes, 2023–2025	Promoted to Secondary coach	Robert Steeples	
Assistant wide receivers coach	Blake Rolan, 2025	Hired as Assistant quarterbacks coach	Cam Odom	
Assistant defensive backs coach	Scott Power, 2025	Hired by Central Washington	Chris Worley	

=== Transfer portal ===
==== Departures ====
Wisconsin outgoing transfers
Name	Number	Pos.	Height	Weight	Year	Hometown	Transfer to	Source
Christian Alliegro	#0	LB	6'4"	247	Junior	Darien, CT	Ohio State	
Geimere Latimer II	#1	CB	5'10"	191	Junior	Fairburn, GA	West Virginia	
Trech Kekahuna	#2	WR	5'10"	185	(redshirt) Sophomore	Honolulu, HI	North Carolina	
Tackett Curtis	#4	LB	6'2"	235	Junior	Many, LA	UCF	
Omillio Agard	#6	CB	5'11"	185	(redshirt) Freshman	Philadelphia, PA	Virginia	
Dilin Jones	#7	RB	6'0"	208	(redshirt) Freshman	Pittsburgh, PA	LSU	
Billy Edwards Jr.	#9	QB	6'3"	228	Graduate Student	Springfield, VA	North Carolina	
Tucker Ashcraft	#11	TE	6'5"	257	Junior	Seattle, WA	USC	
Joseph Griffin Jr.	#12	WR	6'4"	210	(redshirt) Junior	Springfield, MA	UMass	
Preston Zachman	#14	S	6'1"	212	Graduate Student	Elysburg, PA	Indiana	
Kyan Berry-Johnson	#22	WR	5'10"	160	(redshirt) Freshman	Bolingbrook, IL	Sam Houston	
Cade Yacamelli	#25	RB	6'0"	219	(redshirt) Junior	Trafford, PA	Miami (OH)	
Antarron Turner	#28	LB	6'2"	241	(redshirt) Junior	Ocala, FL	Colorado State	
Remington Moss	#32	S	6'1"	194	Freshman	Dumfries, VA	Elon	
Angel Toombs	#36	LB	6'5"	200	(redshirt) Sophomore	Milwaukee, WI	Jacksonville State	
Atticus Bertrams	#49	P	6'3"	233	Junior	Sydney, Australia	UCF	
Joe Brunner	#56	G	6'5"	317	(redshirt) Junior	Whitefish Bay, WI	Indiana	
Cody Raymond	#56	LB	6'4"	234	(redshirt) Freshman	Shelby, MI	Ohio	
Jake Renfro	#57	C	6'4"	313	Graduate Student	Mokena, IL	Illinois	
Leyton Nelson	#66	G	6'6"	311	(redshirt) Junior	Orlando, FL		
Jamel Howard Jr.	#91	DL	6'2"	311	(redshirt) Sophomore	Chicago, IL	UConn	
Ernest Willor Jr.	#93	DL	6'4"	250	(redshirt) Freshman	Baltimore, MD	James Madison	

==== Incoming ====
Wisconsin incoming transfers
Name	Number	Pos.	Height	Weight	Year	Hometown	Previous team	Source
Justus Boone	#0	LB	6'4	275	Graduate Student	Sumter, SC	Arkansas	
Eric Fletcher Jr.	#1	CB	6'1	180	(redshirt) Sophomore	Fort Myers, FL	Oklahoma State	
Colton Joseph	#1	QB	6'2	200	(redshirt) Junior	Newport Beach, CA	Old Dominion	
Javan Robinson	#2	CB	5'11	180	(redshirt) Senior	Winter Garden, FL	Arizona State	
Cai Bates	#3	CB	6'2	190	(redshirt) Sophomore	Orlando, FL	Florida State	
Abu Sama	#3	RB	5'11	210	Senior	Des Moines, IA	Iowa State	
Marvin Burks Jr.	#4	S	6'1	200	Senior	St. Louis, MO	Missouri	
Bryce West	#5	CB	5'11	200	(redshirt) Sophomore	Cleveland, OH	Ohio State	
Shamar Rigby	#7	WR	6'3	190	Junior	St. Petersburg, FL	Oklahoma State	
Deuce Adams	#8	QB	6'2	190	Sophomore	Austin, TX	Louisville	
Jaylon Domingeaux	#9	WR	6'2	210	Senior	Lafayette, LA	Southeastern Louisiana	
Carson Van Dinter	#11	S	6'3	210	(redshirt) Sophomore	Kaukauna, WI	Iowa State	
Zion Kearney	#12	WR	6'1	207	Junior	Fresno, TX	Oklahoma	
Liam Danitz	#14	LB	6'5	232	Graduate Student	West Branch, MI	Hope College	
Nate Palmer	#15	RB	6'0	195	(redshirt) Sophomore	Decatur, TX	TCU	
Malachi Coleman	#16	WR	6'4	200	(redshirt) Junior	Lincoln, NE	Minnesota	
Bryan Jackson II	#21	RB	6'0	230	Junior	McKinney, TX	USC	
Eli Adams	#26	WR	6'0	190	(redshirt) Sophomore	Austin, TX	Louisville	
Jon Jon Kamara	#28	LB	6'4	230	(redshirt) Sophomore	Goodyear, AZ	Kansas	
Jayden Loftin	#39	LB	6'4	255	(redshirt) Freshman	Somerville, NJ	Tennessee	
Taylor Schaefer	#43	LB	6'4	230	(redshirt) Junior	Sturgeon Bay, WI	Iowa Central Community College	
James Roe	#46	LS	5'11	195	Junior	Kennesaw, GA	Toldeo	
Austin Kawecki	#51	OL	6'4	300	(redshirt) Senior	Frisco, TX	Oklahoma State	
P.J. Wilkins	#71	OL	6'5	340	(redshirt) Junior	Atlanta, GA	Ole Miss	
Lucas Simmons-Johnson	#72	OL	6'8	308	(redshirt) Junior	Stockholm, Sweden	Florida State	
Blake Cherry	#73	OL	6'5	315	Sophomore	Claremore, OK	Arkansas	
Stylz Blackmon	#76	OL	6'4	300	Junior	Grain Valley, MO	Augustana (SD)	
Ryan Schwendeman	#84	TE	6'5	245	Senior	O'Fallon, MO	Southern Illinois	
Jacob Harris	#89	TE	6'4	225	(redshirt) Junior	Westerville, OH	Bowling Green	
Hammond Russell IV	#91	DL	6'3	312	Graduate Student	Columbus, OH	West Virginia	
DeNigel Cooper	#93	DL	6'3	260	(redshirt) Sophomore	Kingsland, GA	Appalachian State	
Jake Anderson	#95	DL	6'5	295	(redshirt) Senior	Davis, IL	Illinois State	
Ethan Tranel	#98	P	6'2	200	Junior	Blue Mounds, WI	Wisconsin–La Crosse	
Junior Poyser	#99	DL	6'1	310	(redshirt) Junior	Brampton, ON	Buffalo	

=== Recruiting class ===
College recruiting (2026)
Name	Hometown	School	Height	Weight	Commit date
Jack Sievers; TE	Everett, Washington	Archbishop Murphy High School	6 ft 5 in (1.96 m)	225 lb (102 kg)	Jun 2, 2025
Jack Sievers; TE	Recruit ratings: Rivals: 247Sports: ESPN: (80)				
Ryan Hopkins; QB	San Juan Capistrano, California	Mater Dei High School	6 ft 3 in (1.91 m)	190 lb (86 kg)	Apr 13, 2025
Ryan Hopkins; QB	Recruit ratings: Rivals: 247Sports: ESPN: (80)				
Keeyshawn Tabuteau; WR	Chattanooga, Tennessee	The McCallie School	6 ft 0 in (1.83 m)	175 lb (79 kg)	Dec 1, 2025
Keeyshawn Tabuteau; WR	Recruit ratings: Rivals: 247Sports: ESPN: (79)				
Yahya Gaad; DE	Medina, Tennessee	South Gibson County High School	6 ft 5 in (1.96 m)	260 lb (120 kg)	Oct 12, 2025
Yahya Gaad; DE	Recruit ratings: Rivals: 247Sports: ESPN: (79)				
Brady Bekkenhuis; IOL	Arlington, Massachusetts	Arlington (MA) High School	6 ft 6 in (1.98 m)	285 lb (129 kg)	Nov 26, 2025
Brady Bekkenhuis; IOL	Recruit ratings: Rivals: 247Sports: ESPN: (78)				
Donovan Dunmore; CB	Fresno, California	Buchanan (CA) High School	6 ft 0 in (1.83 m)	170 lb (77 kg)	Sep 22, 2025
Donovan Dunmore; CB	Recruit ratings: Rivals: 247Sports: ESPN: (77)				
Zion Legree; ATH	Niceville, Florida	Choctawhatchee High School	6 ft 1 in (1.85 m)	190 lb (86 kg)	Jun 15, 2025
Zion Legree; ATH	Recruit ratings: Rivals: 247Sports: ESPN: (77)				
Ben Wenzel; LB	Appleton, Wisconsin	Appleton North High School	6 ft 3 in (1.91 m)	215 lb (98 kg)	Jun 1, 2025
Ben Wenzel; LB	Recruit ratings: Rivals: 247Sports: ESPN: (77)				
Djidjou Bah; DT	Germantown, Tennessee	Germantown (TN) High School	6 ft 3 in (1.91 m)	275 lb (125 kg)	Aug 1, 2025
Djidjou Bah; DT	Recruit ratings: Rivals: 247Sports: ESPN: (76)				
Taylor Schaefer; DE	Brussels, Wisconsin	Iowa Central Community College	6 ft 4 in (1.93 m)	240 lb (110 kg)	Nov 30, 2025
Taylor Schaefer; DE	Recruit ratings: Rivals: 247Sports: ESPN: (76)				
Arthur Scott; DT	Streetsboro, Ohio	Streetsboro High School	6 ft 1 in (1.85 m)	310 lb (140 kg)	Jun 1, 2025
Arthur Scott; DT	Recruit ratings: Rivals: 247Sports: ESPN: (76)				
Carsen Eloms; CB	Fishers, Indiana	Fishers High School	6 ft 0 in (1.83 m)	175 lb (79 kg)	Apr 8, 2025
Carsen Eloms; CB	Recruit ratings: Rivals: 247Sports: ESPN: (75)				
Kah'ni Watts; S	Rosharon, Texas	Iowa Colony High School	6 ft 1 in (1.85 m)	170 lb (77 kg)	Dec 4, 2025
Kah'ni Watts; S	Recruit ratings: Rivals: 247Sports: ESPN: (75)				
Kash Brock; WR	Chandler, Arizona	Basha High School	6 ft 2 in (1.88 m)	175 lb (79 kg)	Jan 1, 2026
Kash Brock; WR	Recruit ratings: Rivals: 247Sports: ESPN: (74)				
Juju Pope; RB	Pope, Mississippi	Northwest Mississippi Community College	5 ft 11 in (1.80 m)	195 lb (88 kg)	May 1, 2026
Juju Pope; RB	Recruit ratings: Rivals: 247Sports: ESPN: (72)				
Overall recruit ranking: Rivals: 58 247Sports: 64 ESPN: —
Note: In many cases, Scout, Rivals, 247Sports, On3, and ESPN may conflict in their listings of height and weight.; In these cases, the average was taken. ESPN grades are on a 100-point scale.; Sources: "2026 Wisconsin Football Commitment List". Rivals.; "2026 Wisconsin Football Commitment List". ESPN.; "2026 Team Ranking". Rivals.com.; "Wisconsin 2026 Football Commits". 247Sports.

=== Recruiting class rankings ===
Website	National rank	Conference rank	5 star recruits	4 star recruits	3 star recruits	Total
247Sports	65	17	0	0	15	15
ESPN	—	—	0	2	13	15
Rivals	68	14	0	0	15	15

== Schedule ==
Date	Time	Opponent	Rank	Site	TV	Result	Attendance
September 6	6:30 p.m.	vs. No. 4 Notre Dame*		Lambeau Field; Green Bay, WI (Shamrock Series)	NBC	L 13–41	75,939
September 12	6:15 p.m.	Western Illinois*		Camp Randall Stadium; Madison, WI	BTN	W 36–9	65,274
September 19	11:30 a.m.	Eastern Michigan*		Camp Randall Stadium; Madison, WI	Peacock	W 54–10	66,545
September 26	4:00 p.m.	at No. 13 Penn State		Beaver Stadium; University Park, PA	Peacock	W 24–20	108,014
October 3	11:30 a.m.	Michigan State^{†}		Camp Randall Stadium; Madison, WI	BTN	W 31–3	67,001
October 17	6:30 p.m.	at No. 12 UCLA		Rose Bowl; Pasadena, CA	NBC	L 7–17	36,045
October 24	6:30 p.m.	No. 16 USC		Camp Randall Stadium; Madison, WI	NBC	W 24–7	71,750
October 31	11:00 a.m.	at Iowa	No. 25	Kinnick Stadium; Iowa City, IA (Heartland Trophy, Big Noon Kickoff)	FOX	L 0–30	69,250
November 7	3:15 p.m.	Rutgers		Camp Randall Stadium; Madison, WI	BTN	W 31–10	66,310
November 14	11:00 a.m.	at Maryland		SECU Stadium; College Park, MD	FS1	L 21–24	28,885
November 21	11:00 a.m.	at Purdue		Ross–Ade Stadium; West Lafayette, IN	NBC	W 42–10	45,426
November 27	6:30 p.m.	Minnesota		Camp Randall Stadium; Madison, WI (Paul Bunyan's Axe)	NBC		
*Non-conference game; ^{†}Homecoming; Rankings from AP Poll (and CFP Rankings, after November 3) – Released prior to game; All times are in Central time; Source:

== Rankings ==
Ranking movements Legend: ██ Increase in ranking ██ Decrease in ranking — = Not ranked RV = Received votes
	Week															
Poll	Pre	1	2	3	4	5	6	7	8	9	10	11	12	13	14	Final
AP	—	—	—	—	RV	RV	RV	—	25	—	—	—				
Coaches	—	—	—	—	RV	RV	RV	RV	RV	RV	RV	—				
CFP	Not released									—	—	—				Not released

== Game summaries ==
=== vs No. 4 Notre Dame ===
Wisconsin Badgers (0–0) vs No. 4 Notre Dame Fighting Irish (0–0) – Game summary

Quarter	1	2	3	4	Total
Badgers	3	7	3	0	13
No. 4 Fighting Irish	10	3	14	14	41

at Lambeau Field • Green Bay, Wisconsin

- Date: September 6
- Game time: 6:30 p.m. CDT
- Game weather: Clear, 72 °F (22 °C); Wind: E 6 miles per hour (9.7 km/h)
- Game attendance: 75,939
- Referee: Justin Elliott
- TV announcers (NBC/Peacock): Dan Hicks, Jason Garrett and Caroline Pineda
- Box Score

Game information

First quarter

- (10:53) WIS – Gavin Lahm 27-yard field goal (Drive: 9 plays, 28 yards, 4:25; Wisconsin 3–0)
- (1:31) ND – Spencer Porath 52-yard field goal (Drive: 11 plays, 48 yards, 4:56; Tied 3–3)
- (0:22) ND – James Flanigan 3-yard pass from CJ Carr, Spencer Porath kick (Drive: 4 plays, 13 yards, 1:06; Notre Dame 10–3)

Second quarter

- (12:36) WIS – Malachi Coleman 28-yard pass from Colton Joseph, Gavin Lahm kick (Drive: 2 plays, 48 yards, 0:33; Tied 10–10)
- (8:35) ND – Spencer Porath 26-yard field goal (Drive: 8 plays, 67 yards, 3:43; Notre Dame 13–10)

Third quarter

- (10:23) ND – Aneyas Williams 3-yard run, Spencer Porath kick (Drive: 9 plays, 70 yards, 4:31; Notre Dame 20–10)
- (8:59) ND – DJ McKinney 55-yard Interception return, Spencer Porath kick (Drive: 4 plays, 20 yards, 1:31; Notre Dame 27–10)
- (0:41) WIS – Gavin Lahm 36-yard field goal (Drive: 14 plays, 47 yards, 8:38; Notre Dame 27–13)

Fourth quarter

- (10:48) ND – Aneyas Williams 5-yard run, Spencer Porath kick (Drive: 8 plays, 75 yards, 4:26; Notre Dame 34–13)
- (1:51) ND – Nolan James Jr. 28-yard pass from CJ Carr, Spencer Porath kick (Drive: 12 plays, 88 yards, 6:06; Notre Dame 41–13)

Statistics	WISC	ND
First downs	16	20
Plays–yards	61–284	61–350
Rushes–yards	31–67	32–111
Passing yards	217	239
Passing: comp–att–int	19–30–1	19–29–0
Turnovers	2	0
Time of possession	28:24	31:36

Team	Category	Player	Statistics
Wisconsin	Passing	Colton Joseph	19/30, 217 yards, TD, INT
Wisconsin	Rushing	Abu Sama	19 carries, 50 yards
Wisconsin	Receiving	Malachi Coleman	4 receptions, 76 yards, TD
Notre Dame	Passing	CJ Carr	19/29, 239 yards, 2 TD
Notre Dame	Rushing	Aneyas Williams	20 carries, 90 yards, 2 TD
Notre Dame	Receiving	Jordan Faison	4 receptions, 81 yards

=== vs Western Illinois (FCS) ===
Western Illinois Leathernecks (FCS) (1–1) at Wisconsin Badgers (0–1) – Game summary

Quarter	1	2	3	4	Total
Leathernecks (FCS)	3	3	3	0	9
Badgers	17	6	7	6	36

at Camp Randall Stadium • Madison, Wisconsin

- Date: September 12
- Game time: 6:15 p.m. CDT
- Game weather: Sunny, 77 °F (25 °C); Wind: NW 6 miles per hour (9.7 km/h)
- Game attendance: 65,274
- Referee: Kole Knueppel
- TV announcers (BTN): Lisa Byington, Anthony Herron and Melanie Ricks
- Box Score

Game information

First quarter

- (14:45) WIS – Abu Sama 72-yard run, Gavin Lahm kick (Drive: 1 play, 72 yards, 0:06; Wisconsin 7–0)
- (10:15) WIS – Gavin Lahm 30-yard field goal (Drive: 6 plays, 42 yards, 2:42; Wisconsin 10–0)
- (7:54) WIS – Carson Van Dinter punt block return, Gavin Lahm kick (Drive: 3 plays, 5 yards, 2:21; Wisconsin 17–0)
- (1:52) WIU – Ronan Culkin 27-yard field goal (Drive: 11 plays, 65 yards, 6:02; Wisconsin 17–3)

Second quarter

- (12:48) WIS – Gavin Lahm 49-yard field goal (Drive: 10 plays, 37 yards, 4:00; Wisconsin 20–3)
- (4:59) WIU – Ronan Culkin 27-yard field goal (Drive: 14 plays, 65 yards, 7:49; Wisconsin 20–6)
- (2:30) WIS – Gavin Lahm 51-yard field goal (Drive: 5 plays, 25 yards, 2:25; Wisconsin 23–3)

Third quarter

- (10:24) WIU – Ronan Culkin 34-yard field goal (Drive: 11 plays, 59 yards, 4:36; Wisconsin 23–9)
- (5:39) WIS – Darrion Dupree 28-yard run, Gavin Lahm kick (Drive: 8 plays, 68 yards, 4:40; Wisconsin 30–9)

Fourth quarter

- (5:14) WIS – Chris Brooks Jr. 33-yard pass from Colton Joseph, Gavin Lahm kick failed (Drive: 2 plays, 84 yards, 0:58; Wisconsin 36–9)

Statistics	WIU	WISC
First downs	15	16
Plays–yards	62–302	53–406
Rushes–yards	38–154	31–233
Passing yards	148	173
Passing: comp–att–int	15–24–0	12–22–0
Turnovers	0	0
Time of possession	34:57	25:03

Team	Category	Player	Statistics
Western Illinois	Passing	Kennedy McGill	13/22, 139 yards
Western Illinois	Rushing	Kennedy McGill	18 carries, 88 yards
Western Illinois	Receiving	Jacob Kania	2 receptions, 58 yards
Wisconsin	Passing	Colton Joseph	12/22, 173 yards, TD
Wisconsin	Rushing	Abu Sama	8 carries, 112 yards, TD
Wisconsin	Receiving	Tyrell Henry	4 receptions, 91 yards

=== vs Eastern Michigan ===
Eastern Michigan Eagles (1–2) at Wisconsin Badgers (1–1) – Game summary

Quarter	1	2	3	4	Total
Eagles	7	0	0	3	10
Badgers	3	28	10	13	54

at Camp Randall Stadium • Madison, Wisconsin

- Date: September 19
- Game time: 11:30 a.m. CDT
- Game weather: Rain, 66 °F (19 °C); Wind: SE 9 miles per hour (14 km/h)
- Game attendance: 66,545
- Referee: Jeffrey Servinski
- TV announcers (NBCSN/Peacock): Dave Flemming, Matt Cassel and Lewis Johnson
- Box Score

Game information

First quarter

- (9:24) EMU – Nick Devereaux 18-yard pass from Noah Kim, Rudy Kessinger kick (Drive: 8 plays, 67 yards, 3:06; Eastern Michigan 7–0)
- (0:06) WIS – Gavin Lahm 39-yard field goal (Drive: 14 plays, 70 yards, 7:20; Eastern Michigan 7–3)

Second quarter

- (8:12) WIS – Colton Joseph 4-yard run, Gavin Lahm kick (Drive: 11 plays, 74 yards, 5:56; Wisconsin 10–7)
- (6:44) WIS – Chris Brooks Jr. 75-yard pass from Colton Joseph, Gavin Lahm kick (Drive: 1 play, 75 yards, 0:10; Wisconsin 17–7)
- (2:52) WIS – Darrion Dupree 11-yard run, Gavin Lahm kick (Drive: 2 plays, 42 yards, 5:45; Wisconsin 24–7)
- (0:44) WIS – Tyrell Henry 13-yard pass from Colton Joseph, Gavin Lahm kick (Drive: 4 plays, 50 yards, 0:35; Wisconsin 31–7)

Third quarter

- (14:13) WIS – Cooper Catalano 10-yard fumble recovery, Gavin Lahm kick (Drive: 3 plays, -15 yards, 0:47; Wisconsin 38–7)
- (5:23) WIS – Gavin Lahm 41-yard field goal (Drive: 12 plays, 57 yards, 6:48; Wisconsin 41–7)

Fourth quarter

- (11:16) EMU – Rudy Kessinger 38-yard field goal (Drive: 16 plays, 70 yards, 9:01; Wisconsin 41–10)
- (4:44) WIS – Emmett Bork 7-yard pass from Colton Joseph, Gavin Lahm kick (Drive: 12 plays, 65 yards, 6:32; Wisconsin 48–10)
- (0:00) WIS – Donovan Dunmore 55-yard blocked field goal return (Drive: 11 plays, 35 yards, 4:44; Wisconsin 54–10)

Statistics	EMU	WISC
First downs	15	23
Plays–yards	60–216	63–479
Rushes–yards	30–62	30–117
Passing yards	154	362
Passing: comp–att–int	18–30–2	23–33–1
Turnovers	3	1
Time of possession	28:43	31:17

Team	Category	Player	Statistics
Eastern Michigan	Passing	Noah Kim	16/28, 140 yards, TD, 2 INT
Eastern Michigan	Rushing	Joey Mattord	9 carries, 37 yards
Eastern Michigan	Receiving	Nick Devereaux	3 receptions, 38 yards, TD
Wisconsin	Passing	Colton Joseph	23/33, 362 yards, 3 TD, INT
Wisconsin	Rushing	Colton Joseph	9 carries, 50 yards, TD
Wisconsin	Receiving	Tyrell Henry	14 receptions, 160 yards, TD

=== at No. 13 Penn State ===
Wisconsin Badgers (2–1) at No. 13 Penn State Nittany Lions (3–0) – Game summary

Quarter	1	2	3	4	Total
Badgers	0	7	3	14	24
No. 13 Nittany Lions	3	14	3	0	20

at Beaver Stadium • University Park, Pennsylvania

- Date: September 26
- Game time: 4:00 p.m. CDT
- Game weather: Cloudy, 67 °F (19 °C); Wind: NW 16 miles per hour (26 km/h)
- Game attendance: 108,014
- Referee: Tim O'Dey
- TV announcers (NBCSN/Peacock): Dave Flemming, Matt Cassel and Ashley ShahAhmadi
- Box Score

Game information

First quarter

- (6:16) PSU – Ryan Barker 22-yard field goal (Drive: 7 plays, 36 yards, 3:26; Penn State 3–0)

Second quarter

- (12:50) PSU – Josiah Zayas 51-yard Interception return, Ryan Barker kick (Drive: 4 plays, 26 yards, 2:10; Penn State 10–0)
- (10:29) PSU – Rocco Becht 3-yard run, Ryan Barker kick (Drive: 3 plays, 11 yards, 1:27; Penn State 17–0)
- (1:18) WIS – Colton Joseph 7-yard run, Gavin Lahm kick (Drive: 11 plays, 75 yards, 5:05; Penn State 17–7)

Third quarter

- (10:53) WIS – Gavin Lahm 34-yard field goal (Drive: 4 plays, 6 yards, 1:28; Penn State 17–10)
- (3:53) PSU – Ryan Barker 37-yard field goal (Drive: 13 plays, 56 yards, 7:00; Penn State 20–10)

Fourth quarter

- (3:31) WIS – Eugene Hilton Jr. 11-yard pass from Colton Joseph, Gavin Lahm kick (Drive: 10 plays, 75 yards, 3:31; Penn State 20–17)
- (1:13) WIS – Jacob Harris 72-yard pass from Colton Joseph, Gavin Lahm kick (Drive: 8 plays, 85 yards, 1:15; Wisconsin 24–20)

Statistics	WISC	PSU
First downs	18	12
Plays–yards	66–355	65–233
Rushes–yards	28–120	36–119
Passing yards	235	114
Passing: comp–att–int	18–38–3	12–29–1
Time of possession	29:34	30:26

Team	Category	Player	Statistics
Wisconsin	Passing	Colton Joseph	18/38, 2 TD, 3 INT
Wisconsin	Rushing	Darrion Dupree	8 carries, 52 yards
Wisconsin	Receiving	Jacob Harris	5 receptions, 105 yards, TD
Penn State	Passing	Rocco Becht	12/29, 114 yards, INT
Penn State	Rushing	James Peoples	14 carries, 72 yards
Penn State	Receiving	Chase Sowell	6 receptions, 70 yards

=== vs Michigan State ===
Michigan State Spartans (2–2) vs Wisconsin Badgers (3–1) – Game summary

Quarter	1	2	3	4	Total
Spartans	0	3	0	0	3
Badgers	14	3	7	7	31

at Camp Randall Stadium • Madison, Wisconsin

- Date: October 3
- Game time: 11:30 a.m. CDT
- Game weather: Sunny, 59 °F (15 °C); Wind: S 10 miles per hour (16 km/h)
- Game attendance: 67,001
- Referee: Kole Knueppel
- TV announcers (BTN): Jason Horowitz, Jake Butt and Brooke Fletcher
- Box Score

Game information

First quarter

- (8:16) WIS – Jacob Harris 20-yard pass from Colton Joseph, Gavin Lahm kick (Drive: 13 plays, 75 yards, 6:44; Wisconsin 7–0)
- (1:01) WIS – Jacob Harris 15-yard pass from Colton Joseph, Gavin Lahm kick (Drive: 5 plays, 59 yards, 2:16; Wisconsin 14–0)

Second quarter

- (3:56) WIS – Gavin Lahm 30-yard field goal (Drive: 16 plays, 64 yards, 7:08; Wisconsin 17–0)
- (0:09) MSU – Liam Boyd 31-yard field goal (Drive: 8 plays, 51 yards, 0:54; Wisconsin 17–3)

Third quarter

- (10:35) WIS – Colton Joseph 47-yard run, Gavin Lahm kick (Drive: 3 plays, 54 yards, 1:28; Wisconsin 24–3)

Fourth quarter

- (7:56) WIS – Malachi Coleman 46-yard pass from Colton Joseph, Gavin Lahm kick (Drive: 5 plays, 57 yards, 2:42; Wisconsin 31–3)

Statistics	MSU	WISC
First downs	19	17
Plays–yards	79–235	62–373
Rushes–yards	45–127	42–228
Passing yards	108	145
Passing: comp–att–int	16–34–0	9–20–0
Time of possession	31:10	28:50

Team	Category	Player	Statistics
Michigan State	Passing	Alessio Milivojevic	15/31, 108 yards
Michigan State	Rushing	Jaziun Patterson	18 carries, 62 yards
Michigan State	Receiving	Jayden Savoury	4 receptions, 26 yards
Wisconsin	Passing	Colton Joseph	9/20, 145 yards, 3 TD
Wisconsin	Rushing	Colton Joseph	13 carries, 141 yards, TD
Wisconsin	Receiving	Malachi Coleman	1 reception, 46 yards, TD

=== at No. 12 UCLA ===
Wisconsin Badgers (4–1) at No. 12 UCLA Bruins (5–0) – Game summary

Quarter	1	2	3	4	Total
Badgers	0	0	7	0	7
No. 12 Bruins	3	7	0	7	17

at Rose Bowl • Pasadena, California

- Date: October 17
- Game time: 6:30 p.m. CDT
- Game weather: Cloudy • Temperature: 85 °F (29 °C) • Wind: S at 4 miles per hour (6.4 km/h)
- Game attendance: 36,045
- Referee: Francisco Villar
- TV announcers (NBC): Noah Eagle, Todd Blackledge and Kathryn Tappen
- Box Score

Game information

First quarter

- (3:07) UCLA – Mateen Bhaghani 24-yard field goal (Drive: 16 plays, 84 yards, 8:42; UCLA 3–0)

Second quarter

- (7:16) UCLA – Wayne Knight 1-yard run, Mateen Bhaghani kick (Drive: 13 plays, 91 yards, 7:34; UCLA 10–0)

Third quarter

- (8:17) WIS – Colton Joseph 3-yard run, Gavin Lahm kick (Drive: 11 plays, 44 yards, 5:50; UCLA 10–7)

Fourth quarter

- (11:31) UCLA – Anthony Woods 3-yard run, Mateen Bhaghani kick (Drive: 6 plays, 89 yards, 3:33; UCLA 17–7)

Statistics	WISC	UCLA
First downs	13	20
Plays–yards	49–214	71–384
Rushes–yards	33–148	37–120
Passing yards	66	264
Passing: comp–att–int	6–16–0	22–34–2
Time of possession	22:58	37:02

Team	Category	Player	Statistics
Wisconsin	Passing	Colton Joseph	6/16, 66 yards
Wisconsin	Rushing	Colton Joseph	18 carries, 83 yards, TD
Wisconsin	Receiving	Jaylon Domingeaux	2 receptions, 26 yards
UCLA	Passing	Ty Dieffenbach	22/33, 264 yards, INT
UCLA	Rushing	Anthony Woods	8 carries, 39 yards
UCLA	Receiving	Semaj Morgan	5 receptions, 84 yards

=== vs No. 16 USC ===
No. 16 USC Trojans (6–1) vs Wisconsin Badgers (4–2) – Game summary

Quarter	1	2	3	4	Total
No. 16 Trojans	0	7	0	0	7
Badgers	3	7	7	7	24

at Camp Randall Stadium • Madison, Wisconsin

- Date: October 24
- Game time: 6:30 p.m. CDT
- Game weather: Cloudy • Temperature: 64 °F (18 °C) • Wind: SE at 9 miles per hour (14 km/h)
- Game attendance: 71,750
- Referee: Tim O'Dey
- TV announcers (NBC): Noah Eagle, Todd Blackledge and Kathryn Tappen
- Box Score

Game information

First quarter

- (7:20) WIS – Gavin Lahm 33-yard field goal (Drive: 4 plays, 2 yards, 0520; Wisconsin 3–0)

Second quarter

- (9:44) USC – Taniela Tupou 4-yard pass from Jayden Maiava, Caden Chittenden kick (Drive: 15 plays, 67 yards, 7:01; USC 7–0)
- (1:51) WIS – Byran Jackson II 5-yard run, Gavin Lahm kick (Drive: 13 plays, 75 yards, 7:53; Wisconsin 10–7)

Third quarter

- (9:21) WIS – Chris Brooks Jr. 16-yard pass from Colton Joseph, Gavin Lahm kick (Drive: 10 play, 75 yards, 5:39; Wisconsin 17–7)

Fourth quarter

- (5:02) WIS – Ryan Schwendeman 1-yard run, Gavin Lahm kick (Drive: 13 plays, 59 yards, 8:12; Wisconsin 24–7)

Statistics	USC	WISC
First downs	22	16
Plays–yards	75–241	57–200
Rushes–yards	25–(-17)	43–143
Passing yards	258	58
Passing: comp–att–int	31–50–2	12–14–0
Time of possession	27:24	32:36

Team	Category	Player	Statistics
USC	Passing	Jayden Maiava	31/50, 258 yards, TD, 2 INT
USC	Rushing	Shahn Alston	7 carries, 28 yards
USC	Receiving	Taniela Tupou	6 receptions, 46 yards, TD
Wisconsin	Passing	Colton Joseph	12/14, 58 yards, TD
Wisconsin	Rushing	Abu Sama	17 carries, 71 yards
Wisconsin	Receiving	Eugene Hilton Jr.	3 receptions, 18 yards

=== at Iowa (Heartland Trophy) ===
No. 25 Wisconsin Badgers (5–2) at Iowa Hawkeyes (5–2) – Game summary

Quarter	1	2	3	4	Total
No. 25 Badgers	0	0	0	0	0
Hawkeyes	10	10	10	0	30

at Kinnick Stadium • Iowa City, Iowa

- Date: October 31
- Game time: 11:00 a.m. CDT
- Game weather: Rain • Temperature: 56 °F (13 °C) • Wind: SE at 5 miles per hour (8.0 km/h)
- Game attendance: 69,250
- Referee: Jeff Servinski
- TV announcers (FOX): Gus Johnson, Joel Klatt and Jenny Taft
- Box Score

Game information

First quarter

- (9:08) IOWA – Caden Buhr 24-yard field goal (Drive: 10 plays, 67 yards, 5:48; Iowa 3–0)
- (1:02) IOWA – DJ Vonnahme 4-yard pass from Hank Brown (Caden Buhr kick) (Drive: 12 plays, 75 yards, 6:07; Iowa 10–0)

Second quarter

- (1:30) IOWA – Tony Diaz 4-yard pass from Hank Brown (Caden Buhr kick) (Drive: 7 plays, 98 yards, 2:52; Iowa 17–0)
- (0:00) IOWA – Caden Buhr 28-yard field goal (Drive: 4 plays, 7 yards, 0:45; Iowa 20–0)

Third quarter

- (7:54) IOWA – DJ Vonnahme 2-yard run (Caden Buhr kick) (Drive: 10 plays, 71 yards, 5:28; Iowa 27–0)
- (2:16) IOWA – Caden Buhr 54-yard field goal (Drive: 7 plays, 24 yards, 4:03; Iowa 30–0)

Fourth quarter

- No scoring plays

Statistics	WIS	IOWA
First downs	9	20
Plays–yards	51–235	66–362
Rushes–yards	24–52	42–140
Passing yards	183	222
Passing: comp–att–int	13–27–1	20–24–0
Time of possession	23:39	36:21

Team	Category	Player	Statistics
Wisconsin	Passing	Ryan Hopkins	8/13, 93 yards, INT
Wisconsin	Rushing	Abu Sama III	6 carries, 23 yards
Wisconsin	Receiving	Jaylon Domingeaux	6 receptions, 86 yards
Iowa	Passing	Hank Brown	20/24, 222 yards, 2 TD
Iowa	Rushing	Xavier Williams	20 carries, 78 yards
Iowa	Receiving	Tony Diaz	4 receptions, 75 yards, TD

=== vs Rutgers ===
Rutgers Scarlet Knights (2–6) vs Wisconsin Badgers (5–3) – Game summary

Quarter	1	2	3	4	Total
Scarlet Knights	3	7	0	0	10
Badgers	7	6	11	7	31

at Camp Randall Stadium • Madison, Wisconsin

- Date: November 7
- Game time: 3:15 p.m. CST
- Game weather: Sunny • Temperature: 51 °F (11 °C) • Wind: SW at 9 miles per hour (14 km/h)
- Game attendance: 66,310
- Referee: Chris Coyte
- TV announcers (BTN): Jason Horowitz, Jake Butt and Brooke Fletcher
- Box Score

Game information

First quarter

- (6:25) WIS – Eugene Hilton Jr. 21-yard pass from Ryan Hopkins, (Gavin Lahm kick) (Drive: 8 plays, 86 yards, 4:32; Wisconsin 7–0)
- (0:30) RUT – Jack Scullion 45-yard field goal (Drive: 11 plays, 48 yards, 5:55; Wisconsin 7–3)

Second quarter

- (8:09) WIS – Gavin Lahm 51-yard field goal (Drive: 5 plays, 14 yards, 2:03; Wisconsin 10–3)
- (3:21) RUT – Dyzier Carter 30-yard pass from AJ Surace, (Jack Scullion kick) (Drive: 8 plays, 75 yards, 4:48; Tied 10–10)
- (0:24) WIS – Gavin Lahm 26-yard field goal (Drive: 9 plays, 67 yards, 2:57; Wisconsin 13–10)

Third quarter

- (4:52) WIS – Gavin Lahm 22-yard field goal (Drive: 12 plays, 76 yards, 6:21; Wisconsin 16–10)
- (1:29) WIS – Ryan Schwendeman 11-yard pass from Ryan Hopkins, (Ryan Hopkins–Eugene Hilton Jr. pass) (Drive: 5 plays, 59 yards, 2:01; Wisconsin 24–10)

Fourth quarter

- (10:08) WIS – Jacob Harris 66-yard pass from Ryan Hopkins, (Gavin Lahm kick) (Drive: 5 plays, 72 yards, 2:59; Wisconsin 31–10)

Statistics	RUTG	WISC
First downs	15	21
Plays–yards	60–255	53–363
Rushes–yards	36–94	29–122
Passing yards	161	241
Passing: comp–att–int	14–24–0	18–24–0
Time of possession	32:25	27:35

Team	Category	Player	Statistics
Rutgers	Passing	AJ Surace	14/24, 161 yards, TD
Rutgers	Rushing	Antwan Raymond	15 carries, 56 yards
Rutgers	Receiving	Dyzier Carter	2 receptions, 40 yards, TD
Wisconsin	Passing	Ryan Hopkins	18/24, 241 yards, 3 TD
Wisconsin	Rushing	Eugene Hilton Jr.	3 carries, 39 yards
Wisconsin	Receiving	Jacob Harris	2 receptions, 70 yards, TD

=== at Maryland ===
Wisconsin Badgers (6–3) at Maryland Terrapins (3–6) – Game summary

Quarter	1	2	3	4	Total
Badgers	7	3	3	8	21
Terrapins	0	7	7	10	24

at SECU Stadium • College Park, Maryland

- Date: November 14
- Game time: 11:00 a.m. CST
- Game weather: Sunny • Temperature: 48 °F (9 °C) • Wind: NW at 14 miles per hour (23 km/h)
- Game attendance: 28,885
- Referee: Mark Kluczynski
- TV announcers (FS1): Carlo Jiménez and Petros Papadakis
- Box Score

Game information

First quarter

- (11:01) WIS – Darrion Dupree 4-yard run, (Gavin Lahm kick) (Drive: 5 plays, 57 yards, 2:10; Wisconsin 7–0)

Second quarter

- (8:08) WIS – Gavin Lahm 27-yard field goal (Drive: 11 plays, 48 yards, 5:30; Wisconsin 10–0)
- (3:16) MD – Cardell Williams 1-yard run, (Sean O'Haire kick) (Drive: 9 plays, 75 yards, 4:52; Wisconsin 10–7)

Third quarter

- (8:24) MD – Cardell Williams 3-yard run, (Sean O'Haire kick) (Drive: 4 plays, 12 yards, 2:05; Maryland 14–10)
- (4:23) WIS – Gavin Lahm 42-yard field goal (Drive: 9 plays, 46 yards, 3:53; Maryland 14–13)

Fourth quarter

- (14:04) WIS – Darrion Dupree 1-yard run, (Ryan Hopkins–Eugene Hilton Jr. pass) (Drive: 6 plays, 57 yards, 3:07; Wisconsin 21–14)
- (2:11) MD – Preston Howard 39-yard pass from Cardell Williams, (Sean O'Haire kick) (Drive: 1 play, 29 yards, 0:09; Tied 21–21)
- (0:29) MD – Sean O'Haire 30-yard field goal (Drive: 6 plays, 21 yards, 1:25; Maryland 24–21)

Statistics	WISC	MD
First downs	15	15
Plays–yards	56–201	62–290
Rushes–yards	31–102	39–107
Passing yards	99	183
Passing: comp–att–int	13–25–0	21–23–0
Time of possession	26:20	33:40

Team	Category	Player	Statistics
Wisconsin	Passing	Ryan Hopkins	11/22, 77 yards
Wisconsin	Rushing	Darrion Dupree	14 carries, 57 yards, 2 TD
Wisconsin	Receiving	Jaylon Domingeaux	2 receptions, 28 yards
Maryland	Passing	Cardell Williams	21/23, 183 yards, TD
Maryland	Rushing	DeJuan Williams	22 carries, 79 yards
Maryland	Receiving	Preston Howard	4 receptions, 77 yards, TD

=== at Purdue ===
Wisconsin Badgers (6–4) at Purdue Boilermakers (3–7) – Game summary

Quarter	1	2	3	4	Total
Badgers	14	7	7	14	42
Boilermakers	0	10	0	0	10

at Ross–Ade Stadium • West Lafayette, Indiana

- Date: November 21
- Game time: 11:00 a.m. CST
- Game weather: Sunny • Temperature: 65 °F (18 °C) • Wind: S at 7 miles per hour (11 km/h)
- Game attendance: 45,426
- Referee: John Servinski
- TV announcers (NBC): Jason Benetti, Matt Cassel and Ashley ShahAhmadi
- Box score

Game information

First quarter

- (8:01) WIS – Eugene Hilton Jr. 24-yard run, Gavin Lahm kick (Drive: 14 plays, 75 yards, 6:59; Wisconsin 7–0)
- (2:57) WIS – Colton Joseph 32-yard run, Gavin Lahm kick (Drive: 8 plays, 68 yards, 4:15; Wisconsin 14–0)

Second quarter

- (14:55) PUR – Jacobo Echeverria Lozano 53-yard field goal (Drive: 8 plays, 40 yards, 3:02; Wisconsin 14–3)
- (13:03) WIS – Darrion Dupree 49-yard run, Gavin Lahm kick (Drive: 2 plays, 75 yards, 0:52; Wisconsin 21–3)
- (6:53) PUR – Fame Ijeboi 1-yard run, Jacobo Echeverria Lozano kick (Drive: 14 plays, 75 yards, 7:10; Wisconsin 21–10)

Third quarter

- (5:35) WIS – Darrion Dupree 1-yard run, Gavin Lahm kick (Drive: 12 plays, 74 yards, 7:10; Wisconsin 28–10)

Fourth quarter

- (10:59) WIS – Colton Joseph 13-yard pass from Eugene Hilton Jr., Gavin Lahm kick (Drive: 11 plays, 85 yards, 6:27; Wisconsin 35–10)
- (6:07) WIS – Colton Joseph 66-yard run, Gavin Lahm kick (Drive: 1 play, 66 yards, 0:11; Wisconsin 42–10)

Statistics	WISC	PUR
First downs	26	17
Plays–yards	70–508	56–199
Rushes–yards	58–381	22–66
Passing yards	127	133
Passing: comp–att–int	13–19–0	13–34–1
Time of possession	35:42	24:18

Team	Category	Player	Statistics
Wisconsin	Passing	Colton Joseph	12/18, 114 yards
Wisconsin	Rushing	Colton Joseph	16 carries, 201 yards, 2 TD
Wisconsin	Receiving	Jaylon Domingeaux	3 receptions, 39 yards
Purdue	Passing	Ryan Browne	13/32, 133 yards, INT
Purdue	Rushing	Fame Ijeboi	10 carries, 40 yards, TD
Purdue	Receiving	Cooper McCutchan	3 receptions, 36 yards

=== vs Minnesota (Paul Bunyan's Axe) ===
Minnesota Golden Gophers (0–0) vs Wisconsin Badgers (0–0) – Game summary

Quarter	1	2	Total
Golden Gophers			0
Badgers			0

at Camp Randall Stadium • Madison, Wisconsin

- Date: November 27
- Game time: 6:30 p.m. CST
- Game weather:
- Game attendance:
- Referee:
- TV announcers (NBC):

Game information

First quarter
Second quarter
Third quarter
Fourth quarter

Statistics	MINN	WISC
First downs		
Plays–yards		
Rushes–yards		
Passing yards		
Passing: comp–att–int		
Time of possession		

Team	Category	Player	Statistics
Minnesota	Passing		
Minnesota	Rushing		
Minnesota	Receiving		
Wisconsin	Passing		
Wisconsin	Rushing		
Wisconsin	Receiving		

== Personnel ==
=== Roster ===
2026 Wisconsin Badgers football team roster
Players
Coaches
Offense

Pos.	#	Name	Class
WR	0	Tyrell Henry	Sr
QB	1	Colton Joseph	Jr
WR	2	Chris Brooks Jr.	Sr
RB	3	Abu Sama III	Sr
QB	5	Carter Smith	Fr
RB	6	Darrion Dupree	Jr
WR	7	Shamar Rigby	Jr
QB	8	Deuce Adams	So
WR	9	Jaylon Domingeaux	Sr
QB	10	Ryan Hopkins	Fr
RB	10	Gideon Ituka	So
WR	11	Kash Brock	Fr
WR	12	Zion Kearney	Jr
WR	13	Eugene Hilton Jr.	So
WR	14	Keeyshawn Tabuteau	Fr
RB	15	Nate Palmer	So
WR	16	Malachi Coleman	Jr
TE	17	Nizyi Davis	Fr
QB	18	Danny O'Neil (injured)	Jr
WR	19	Langdon Nordgaard	So
RB	20	Juju Pope	So
RB	21	Bryan Jackson II	Jr
WR	22	Dorsett Stecker	Fr
WR	23	Davion Thomas-Kumpula	Jr
WR	24	Zion Legree	Fr
WR	26	Eli Adams	So
RB	32	Harrison Bortolotti	So
TE	37	Trevor Stoffel	Fr
RB	38	Mason Lane	So
FB	41	McCoy Smith	Fr
TE	42	Tyler Jansey	Jr
TE	49	Ayton Fickell	Fr
OL	50	Ryan Cory	So
OL	51	Austin Kawecki	GS
OL	52	Hardy Watts	Fr
OL	53	Cam Clark	Fr
OL	54	Brady Bekkenhuis	Fr
OL	55	Kevin Heywood (injured)	So
OL	58	Michael Roeske	Fr
OL	60	Nolan Davenport	Fr
OL	64	Evan Brown	Jr
OL	65	Aiden Dirksen	Fr
OL	70	Barrett Nelson	Sr
OL	71	PJ Wilkins	Jr
OL	72	Lucas Simmons-Johansson	Jr
OL	73	Blake Cherry	So
OL	75	Emerson Mandell	So
OL	76	Stylz Blackmon	Jr
OL	77	Peyton Lange	Jr
OL	78	Colin Cubberly	So
OL	79	Logan Powell	Fr
WR	81	Mason Kelley	Fr
TE	82	Emmett Bork	Fr
TE	84	Ryan Schwendeman	GS
TE	85	Grant Stec	So
TE	86	Jack Sievers	Fr
WR	87	Jackson McGohan	Jr
TE	89	Jacob Harris	Jr

Defense

Pos.	#	Name	Class
OLB	0	Justus Boone	GS
CB	1	Eric Fletcher Jr.	So
CB	2	Javan Robinson	Sr
CB	3	Cai Bates (injured)	So
S	4	Marvin Burks Jr.	Sr
CB	5	Bryce West	So
CB	6	Jai'mier Scott	Fr
OLB	7	Tyreese Fearbry	Sr
LB	8	Mason Posa	So
CB	10	Jahmare Washington	Fr
S	11	Carsen Van Dinter	So
OLB	12	Nicolas Clayton	So
S	13	Matthew Traynor	Jr
LB	14	Liam Danitz	Sr
LB	15	Sebastian Cheeks	GS
S	16	Grant Dean	So
CB	17	Carsen Eloms	Fr
CB	18	Donovan Dunmore	Fr
LB	19	Thomas Heiberger	So
S	20	Luke Emmerich	Fr
S	21	Cairo Skanes	So
OLB	22	Jaylen Williams	Fr
LB	23	Landon Gauthier	So
S	25	Will Mikonowicz	Fr
S	26	Kah'ni Watts	Fr
S	27	Raphael Dunn	So
LB	28	Jon Jon Kamara	So
S	29	Matthew Jung	Sr
DL	30	Charles Perkins	Sr
LB	34	Ashton Fickell	Fr
LB	39	Jayden Loftin	Fr
LB	43	Taylor Schaefer	Jr
LB	44	Cooper Catalano	So
OLB	45	Yahya Gaad	Fr
OLB	47	Evan Van Dyn Hoven	Jr
LB	49	Ben Wenzel	Fr
OLB	50	Sam Lateju	Fr
OLB	51	Micheal Garner	Sr
OLB	55	Drew Braam	So
OLB	59	Aaron Witt	GS
DL	76	Dillan Johnson	Jr
OLB	77	Will McDonald	Jr
DL	85	Hayden Metzger	So
DL	90	Djidjou Bah	Fr
DL	91	Hammond Russell IV	GS
DL	92	Nolan Vils	Jr
DL	93	DeNigel Cooper	So
DL	94	Xavier Ukponu	Fr
DL	95	Jacob Anderson	GS
DL	96	Arthur Scott III	Fr
DL	98	Torin Pettaway	Fr
DL	99	Junior Poyser	Jr

Special teams

Pos.	#	Name	Class
LS	46	James Roe	Jr
LS	48	Andrew Goodman	Sr
P	90	Will Kelly	Fr
P	91	Sean West	So
K	94	Brady Melum	Fr
K	97	Gavin Lahm	GS
P	98	Ethan Tranel	Jr

Head coach

- Luke Fickell

Coordinators/assistant coaches

- Jeff Grimes – Offensive coordinator
- Mike Tressel – Defensive coordinator
- Bob Ligashesky – Special teams coordinator
- Tuf Borland – Inside linebackers
- Ari Confesor – Wide receivers
- Jack Cooper – Safeties
- Kenny Guiton – Quarterbacks
- Paul Haynes – Secondary
- Jayden Everett – Running backs
- Nate Letton – Assistant head coach/Tight ends
- Eric Mateos – Offensive linemen
- Matt Mitchell – Associate head coach/outside linebackers
- Robert Steeples – Cornerbacks
- E. J. Whitlow – Defensive linemen
- Michael Cibene – Assistant special teams coordinator
- Joe Ludwig – Assistant tight ends
- Cam Odom – Assistant wide receivers
- Casey Rabach – Assistant offensive linemen
- Blake Rolan – Assistant quarterbacks
- Chris Worley – Assistant defensive backs – nickels
- Cooper Eckhardt – Graduate assistant – defense
- Landon Fickell – Graduate assistant – defense
- Dylan Barnett – Offensive assistant
- Bryan Sanborn – Defensive assistant

Legend

- (C) Team captain
- (S) Suspended
- (I) Ineligible
- Injured
- Redshirt

Roster
