= Ryan Hopkins =

Ryan Hopkins may refer to:

- Ryan Hopkins (American football), a quarterback for the Wisconsin Badgers
- Ryan Hopkins (soccer), the head coach for the San Diego State Aztecs

== See also ==
- Ryan Nugent-Hopkins, Canadian hockey player
