= Bryce West =

American football player

No. 5 – Wisconsin Badgers
- Position: Cornerback
- Class: Junior

Personal information
- Listed height: 5 ft 11 in (1.80 m)
- Listed weight: 200 lb (91 kg)

Career information
- High school: Glenville (Glenville, Cleveland, Ohio)
- College: Ohio State (2024–2025); Wisconsin (2026–present)
- Stats at ESPN

Bryce West is an American college football cornerback for the Wisconsin Badgers. He previously played for the Ohio State Buckeyes.

== Early life ==
West attended Glenville High School in Glenville, Cleveland, Ohio. As a senior, he was named the Northeast Lakes District Defensive Player of the Year. A four-star recruit, he was selected to play in the 2025 Under Armour All-America Game. He committed to Ohio State University to play college football. West was also a member of the track and field team in high school.

== College career ==
West played in seven games his freshman year at Ohio State in 2024 and redshirted. He played in eight games in 2025 and had nine tackles. West entered the transfer portal after the season and committed to the University of Wisconsin–Madison. He entered his first season at Wisconsin in 2026 as the teams starting nickelback.
