= Ryan Hopkins (American football) =

American football player

No. 10 – Wisconsin Badgers
- Position: Quarterback
- Class: Freshman

Personal information
- Listed height: 6 ft 3 in (1.91 m)
- Listed weight: 205 lb (93 kg)

Career information
- High school: JSerra Catholic (San Juan Capistrano, California); Mater Dei (Santa Ana, California)
- College: Wisconsin (2026–present)
- Stats at ESPN

Ryan Hopkins is an American college football quarterback for the Wisconsin Badgers.

== Early life ==
Hopkins attended JSerra Catholic High School in San Juan Capistrano, California for his first three years of high school, earning All-Trinity team honors after leading the Lions to their first Trinity League title. Hopkins opted to transfer to rival Mater Dei High School in Santa Ana, California for his senior season. Hopkins was rated a four-star recruit and the 12th overall quarterback in the Class of 2026 by ESPN. He committed to play for the Wisconsin Badgers over other schools such as Arizona, California, Duke, Kentucky, Michigan State, Missouri, Oklahoma State and Washington.

== College career ==
Heading into his freshman season in 2026, Hopkins beat out Carter Smith and Deuce Adams to be the Badgers' backup behind Colton Joseph. He made his collegiate debut against Western Illinois on September 13, 2026. Following an injury to Joseph, Hopkins was named the Badgers' starting quarterback against Rutgers. In his debut, he went 18-of-24 for 241 passing yards with three passing touchdowns, earning Big Ten Freshman of the Week honors.

== Personal life ==
Hopkins is the brother of Kansas City Current soccer player Haley Hopkins.
