= Colton Joseph =

American football player

No. 1 – Wisconsin Badgers
- Position: Quarterback
- Class: Redshirt Junior

Personal information
- Listed height: 6 ft 2 in (1.88 m)
- Listed weight: 212 lb (96 kg)

Career information
- High school: Newport Harbor (Newport Beach, California)
- College: Old Dominion (2023–2025); Wisconsin (2026–present)

Awards and highlights
- Sun Belt Offensive Player of the Year (2025); Second-team All-Sun Belt (2025)
- Stats at ESPN

Colton Joseph is an American college football quarterback for the Wisconsin Badgers. He previously played for the Old Dominion Monarchs.

== Early life ==
Joseph attended high school at Newport Harbor located in Newport Beach, California. Coming out of high school, he committed to play college football for the Old Dominion Monarchs.

== College career ==
=== Old Dominion ===
Joseph redshirted his freshman year at Old Dominion. In week eight of the 2024 season, Joseph completed 15 of his 28 passes for 130 yards, while adding 111 yards and three touchdowns on the ground in a win over Texas State. In week nine, he completed 20 of his 26 passes for 304 yards and four touchdowns, while also adding 69 yards and a touchdown on the ground in a victory over Georgia Southern. He finished the 2024 season, playing in nine games with eight starts, where he completed 133 of his 222 pass attempts for 1,627 yards and 11 touchdowns, with five interceptions, while rushing 114 times for 647 yards and a 11 touchdowns.

Joseph entered the 2025 season as the team's starter, where in their week one matchup he completed 11 of his 22 passes for 96 yards and three interceptions, but rushed for 179 yards and two touchdowns on ten carries, in a loss to eventual national champions Indiana. His emergence as a dual-threat quarterback garnered national attention after finishing the 2025 season with 2,624 passing yards, 21 passing touchdowns, 1,007 rushing yards, and 13 rushing touchdowns, leading the Monarchs to a 9–3 record that sent them to the 2025 Cure Bowl. On December 9, 2025, Joseph entered the transfer portal and would forgo playing in the Cure Bowl.

=== Wisconsin ===
On January 4, 2026, Joseph transferred to Wisconsin.

=== Statistics ===
Season	Team	Games			Passing								Rushing			
Season	Team	GP	GS	Record	Cmp	Att	Pct	Yds	Y/A	TD	Int	Rtg	Att	Yds	Avg	TD
2023	Old Dominion	0	0	—	Redshirted (redshirt)											
2024	Old Dominion	9	8	3–5	133	222	59.9	1,627	7.3	11	5	133.3	114	647	5.7	11
2025	Old Dominion	12	12	9–3	173	290	59.7	2,624	9.0	21	10	152.6	158	1,007	6.4	13
2026	Wisconsin	8	8	5−3	106	189	56.1	1,368	7.2	11	5	130.6	91	371	4.1	4
Career		29	28	17−11	412	701	56.1	5,619	8.0	43	20	140.6	363	2,025	5.6	28
