= Jerry Newton =

American politician (born 1937)

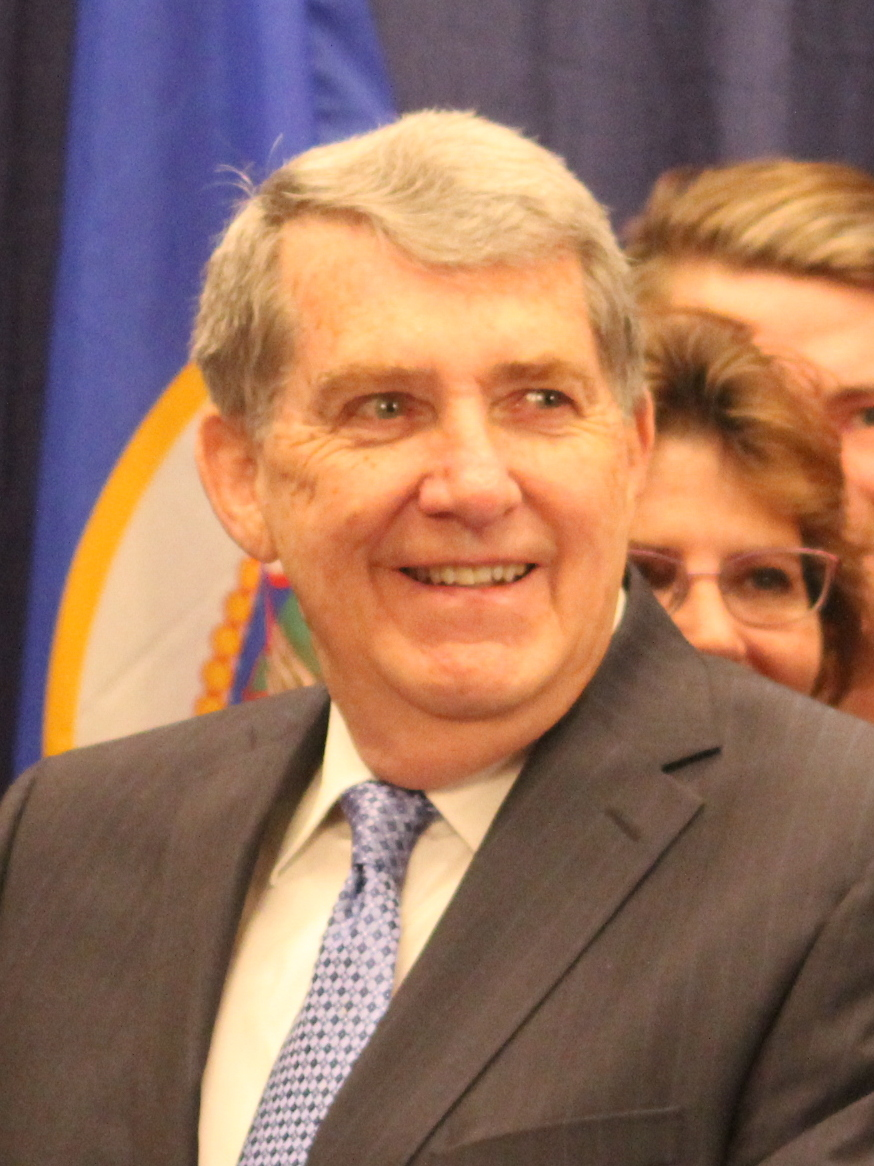

Member of the Minnesota Senate from the 37th district
- In office January 2, 2017 – January 1, 2023
- Preceded by: Alice Johnson
- Succeeded by: Warren Limmer

Member of the Minnesota House of Representatives
- In office January 2, 2023 – January 5, 2025
- Preceded by: Peggy Scott
- Succeeded by: Kari Rehrauer
- Constituency: District 35B
- In office January 7, 2013 – January 1, 2017
- Preceded by: Tara Mack
- Succeeded by: Erin Koegel
- Constituency: District 37A
- In office January 6, 2009 – January 3, 2011
- Preceded by: Kathy Tingelstad
- Succeeded by: Branden Petersen
- Constituency: District 49B

Personal details
- Born: September 15, 1937 (age 89) Minneapolis, Minnesota
- Party: Minnesota Democratic–Farmer–Labor Party
- Spouse: Rita
- Children: 6
- Education: University of Maryland; Boston University; University of Leuven; University of Minnesota
- Occupation: Business owner, educator, legislator, veteran

Gerald F. "Jerry" Newton (born September 15, 1937) is an American retired politician from Minnesota. A member of the Minnesota Democratic–Farmer–Labor Party (DFL), he served in the Minnesota House of Representatives from 2009 to 2017, and again from 2023 to 2025, and in the Minnesota Senate from 2017 to 2023. Newton represented District 35B in the northern Twin Cities metropolitan area, which includes the cities of Coon Rapids and Andover and parts of Anoka County.

== Early life, education, and career ==
Newton graduated from Osseo High School in Osseo, Minnesota, then earned his B.A. in government from the University of Maryland in 1973. He received his MA in international relations in 1975 from Boston University, and studied political science at the doctoral level at the Catholic University of Leuven in Leuven, Belgium, and at the University of Minnesota in Minneapolis.

Newton served on active duty in the United States Army from 1955 to 1978, retiring as a sergeant major, having been deployed overseas for 18 of his 23 years of service, including in Vietnam during the Vietnam War and seven years in the Middle East. The Bronze Star and the Vietnam Cross of Gallantry with Palm are among his 23 awards of medals, battle stars, services ribbons, and decorations. He taught courses in political science at the Overseas Division of the University of Maryland in 1975–76, at the University of Minnesota in 1979–80, and at Anoka Ramsey Community College from 2012 to 2014. He owned and managed the Blaine Dairy Store, Inc and Liberty Park Grocery from 1980 to 2001.

== Minnesota State Senate ==
Newton was first elected to the Senate in 2016, succeeding the retiring Alice Johnson. He was a member of the following committees and commissions:

- Energy and Utilities Finance and Policy
- Ranking Minority Chair of Veterans and Military Affairs Finance and Policy
- Chair, Legislative Permanent School Fund Commission
- Minnesota Amateur Sports Commission

== Minnesota House of Representatives ==
Newton was first elected to the House in 2008, succeeding six-term Representative Kathy Tingelstad, who did not seek reelection. He was unseated by Republican Branden Petersen in the 2010 general election. He ran again and was elected in 2012.

During his first term, he was a member of the House K-12 Finance Committee, House K-12 Policy Committee, the House Transportation Fiance Committee and was Vice Chair of the Veterans Affairs Division of the House Agriculture, Rural Economies and Veterans Affairs Committee.

He was the Minnesota School Board Association 2009 Legislator of the Year for his leadership on hearings and legislation relating to special education. In 2009 Newton was also appointed by Speaker of the House Paul Thissen to perform an in-depth study of veterans homes. In 2010 Thissen appointed him to co-chair the Coon Rapids Dam Legislative Commission to provide a barrier for invasive species of fish from gaining access to northeastern Minnesota waterways.

== Personal life ==
Active in his local community and government, Newton was a member of the Coon Rapids City Council from 1994 to 2000, and served as acting mayor from 1999 to 2000. He was a member of the Anoka-Hennepin School District 11 School Board from 2000 to 2008. He has chaired the Anoka Human Rights Council and served on the Anoka County Affordable Housing Coalition, the Coon Rapids Economic Development Authority, the Crystal Housing and Redevelopment Authority, the Energy, Environment and Natural Resources Committee of the National League of Cities (1995–2000), the Metropolitan Council Transportation Advisory Board (1996–2000), the Association of Metropolitan Municipalities, and the Northstar Corridor Development Authority.

Newton was a founding board member, president and emeritus director of Free2 Be, Inc. and is a former member of the Metro North Chamber of Commerce and the Coon Rapids Rotary, where he was honored as a Paul Harris Fellow. He is a life member of the VFW and is a member of Disabled American Veterans (DAV) and the Coon Rapids American Legion. Newton was best known locally for creating unique rail crossing quiet zones that set a national standard for enhanced rail crossing safety while silencing train horns. He initiated the local school district's first high school Science, Technology, Engineering and Math program at Blaine High School, the Baccalaureate program at Champlin Park High School and the Compass program to insure expelled students received continuing hands-on education.
