= Maple Grove Senior High School =

Public school in Minnesota, United States

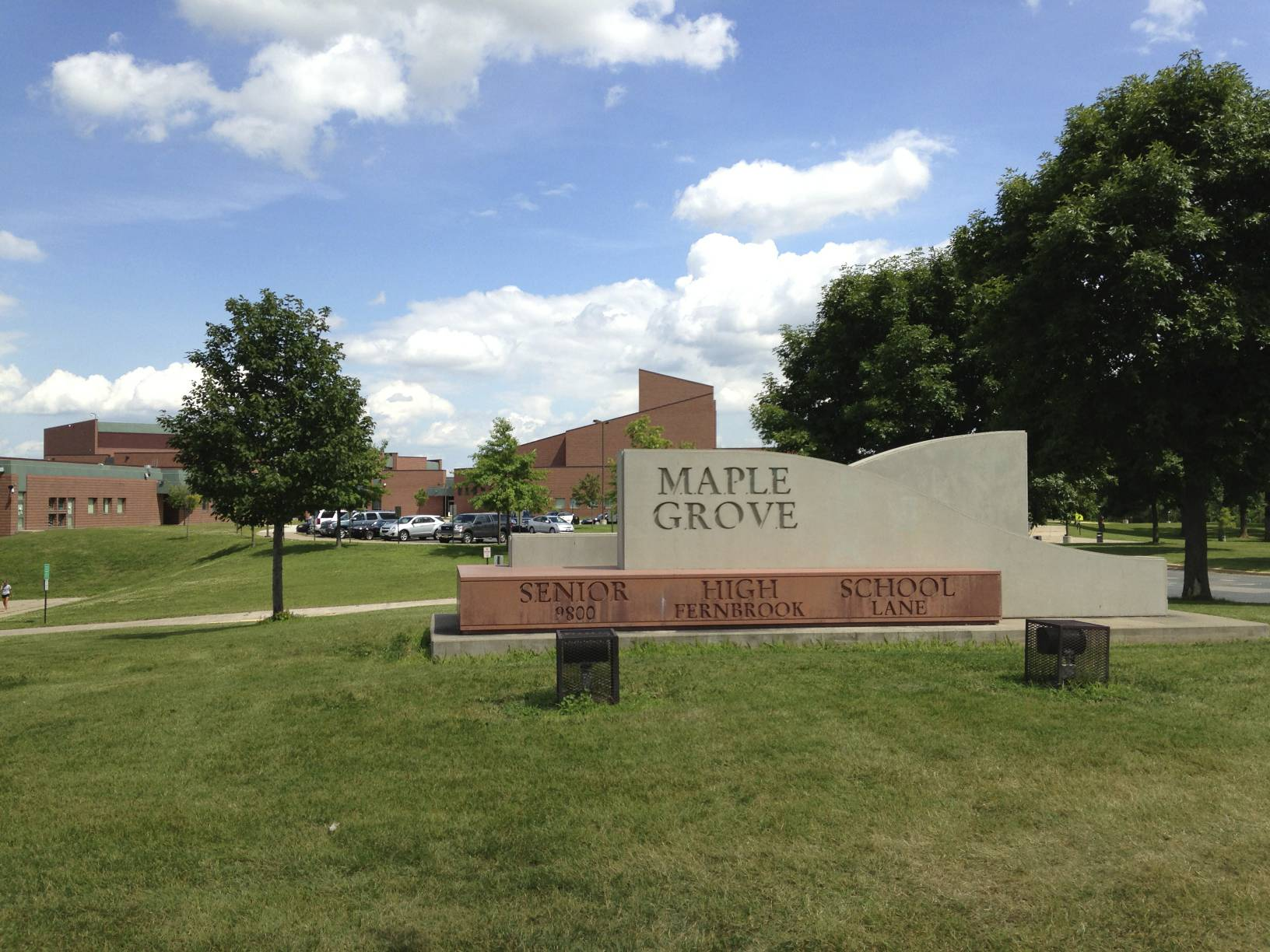

Location
- 9800 Fernbrook Lane North (County Rd. 121); Maple Grove, Minnesota 55369; United States; 45°07′57″N 93°27′35″W

Information
- Type: Public
- Motto: "Fear the Leaf" "Live Each Day The Crimson Way"
- Established: 1996
- Principal: Bart Becker
- Teaching staff: 110.86 (FTE)
- Grades: 9-12
- Enrollment: 2,453 (2024-2025)
- Student to teacher ratio: 22.13
- Colors: Crimson; Gold
- Mascot: Leafy the Crimson Leaf
- Nickname: The Crimson
- Rival: Osseo Orioles
- Website: mgsh.district279.org

Maple Grove Senior High School (MGSH) is a public grade 9–12 high school located in Maple Grove, Minnesota, United States. It is one of three high schools in the Osseo School District (279). Its feeder schools are Maple Grove Middle School and Osseo Middle School. The school has included grades 9–12 since September 2015. Previously grade 9 attended junior high school. MGSH contains students from the cities of Maple Grove, Corcoran, Dayton, Rogers, and Plymouth.

== History ==
Maple Grove Senior High opened in 1996 as the third public high school built by the Osseo School District. MGSH is the only public high school located in Maple Grove, Minnesota, although the zoning of Osseo Senior High School and Wayzata High School are partially located within the boundaries of the city of Maple Grove. MGSH now includes grades 9-12 as of September 2015.

== Curriculum ==
Around 200 courses are available at Maple Grove Senior High. Types of courses include Advanced Placement, Honors, traditional, remedial, and special education courses. Through the Minnesota state Post Secondary Enrollment Options (PSEO) program, students are eligible to take classes at state colleges and universities. PSEO participation counts towards graduation requirements. Maple Grove implemented standards-based grading in 2011. Maple Grove has been working on learning how to effectively implement standard based grading to help better prepare students for college in the last five years.

== Demographics ==
According to the Minnesota Department of Education, the demographic breakdown of the 2,271 students enrolled in 2023-24 school year was:

- Native American - 1.8%
- Asian/Pacific Islanders - 7.4%
- Black - 12.2%
- Hispanic - 4.2%
- White - 69.2%
- Multiracial - 5.1%

22.5% of the students were eligible for free or reduced-cost lunch.

== Athletics ==
The Maple Grove Crimsons are members of the Lake Conference of the Minnesota State High School League. Regarded as one of the most challenging conferences in Minnesota, the Lake Conference have some of the largest schools in the state, including Wayzata, Edina, Eden Prairie, and Minnetonka. The school mascot is Leafy, a crimson and gold maple leaf. Following recommendations from the Minnesota State High School League, it was announced in September 2024 that the Maple Grove Crimson would be leaving the Northwest Suburban Conference to join the Lake Conference. This will make it the only high school in the district to not be a part of the Northwest Suburban Conference.

== Hockey ==
The boys and girls hockey teams play out of the Maple Grove Community Center, a large recreational complex and a 1500-seat ice arena located in the city. In 2022, the Boys team was the runner up in the Minnesota State High School Hockey Tournament, to the Andover Huskies. The boys head coach is Todd Bergland. Both the boys and girls teams compete in section 5AA.

== Football ==
On December 2, 2022, Maple Grove's football team won their first-ever class 5A state championship title in a 27–10 victory over Rosemount. With this win, Maple Grove would also finish undefeated, at 13–0 on the season. In 2024, Maple Grove would yet again go undefeated to win the class 5A state championship title, this time defeating Minnetonka 28-21.

== Adaptive Sports ==
Maple Grove Senior High and the other schools in the Osseo School District have a combined team for adaptive sports. These students have the opportunity to participate in soccer, floor hockey, bowling, and softball. In the fall of 2025, they won the state tournament in soccer.

== Notable alumni ==
- Alasan Ann, Professional taekwondo practitioner, representing The Gambia in the 2024 Summer Olympics
- Kayode Awosika – professional football player
- Isaac Collins - Major League Baseball outfielder
- Brad Davison — American college basketball player, formerly played for the Wisconsin Badgers
- Dakota Darsow — professional wrestler
- Brock Faber - Professional ice hockey player and gold medalist in the 2026 Milan Winter Olympics
- Jordan Gross — professional ice hockey player
- Evan Hull — NFL running back for the Indianapolis Colts
- Jake Wieneke — professional football player
