= 2025 Iowa Hawkeyes football team =

American college football season

2025 Iowa Hawkeyes football

ReliaQuest Bowl champion

ReliaQuest Bowl, W 34–27 vs. Vanderbilt
- Conference: Big Ten Conference

Ranking
- Coaches: No. 17
- AP: No. 17
- Record: 9–4 (6–3 Big Ten)
- Head coach: Kirk Ferentz (27th season)
- Offensive coordinator: Tim Lester (2nd season)
- Offensive scheme: West Coast
- Defensive coordinator: Phil Parker (14th season)
- Base defense: 4–2–5
- Home stadium: Kinnick Stadium

2025 Big Ten Conference football standings
	Conf.			Overall
Team	W		L	W		L
No. 1 Indiana y$#^	9	–	0	16	–	0
No. 5 Ohio State y^	9	–	0	12	–	2
No. 4 Oregon ^	8	–	1	13	–	2
No. 21 Michigan	7	–	2	9	–	4
No. 20 USC	7	–	2	9	–	4
No. 17 Iowa	6	–	3	9	–	4
Illinois	5	–	4	9	–	4
Washington	5	–	4	9	–	4
Minnesota	5	–	4	8	–	5
Nebraska	4	–	5	7	–	6
Northwestern	4	–	5	7	–	6
Penn State	3	–	6	7	–	6
UCLA	3	–	6	3	–	9
Rutgers	2	–	7	5	–	7
Wisconsin	2	–	7	4	–	8
Maryland	1	–	8	4	–	8
Michigan State	1	–	8	4	–	8
Purdue	0	–	9	2	–	10
Championship: Indiana 13, Ohio State 10
# – College Football Playoff champion; ^ – College Football Playoff participant; $ – Conference champion; y – Championship game participant; As of October 24, 2026; Rankings from AP Poll

The 2025 Iowa Hawkeyes football team represented the University of Iowa as a member of the Big Ten Conference during the 2025 NCAA Division I FBS football season. The Hawkeyes were led by twenty seventh-year head coach Kirk Ferentz. Iowa played their home games at Kinnick Stadium located in Iowa City, Iowa, and sold out all seven home contests for the fourth consecutive season.

The Hawkeyes ended the 2025 season with a 34–27 win over the No. 14 Vanderbilt Commodores in the ReliaQuest Bowl to finish with a 9–4 record (6–3 Big Ten). During the regular season, Iowa lost four games by a total of 15 points to opponents all ranked in the top 20.

Graduate student center Logan Jones was named First-team All-Big Ten, Unanimous First-team All-American, and awarded the Rimington Trophy. Fellow graduate student Kaden Wetjen, return specialist, was named First-team All-Big Ten and Rodgers–Dwight Return Specialist of the Year for the second time, and Consensus First-team All-American. Senior quarterback Mark Gronowski tied the single-season Big Ten record for rushing touchdowns by a QB (16) and ended his career with an NCAA record 58 wins as a starter.

== Offseason ==
=== 2025 NFL draft ===
Round	Pick	Player	Position	Team
3	83	Kaleb Johnson	RB	Pittsburgh Steelers
5	164	Yahya Black	DT	Pittsburgh Steelers
7	234	Mason Richman	OT	Seattle Seahawks
7*	249	Connor Colby	G	San Francisco 49ers
7*	255	Luke Lachey	TE	Houston Texans

=== Transfers ===
==== Outgoing ====
Player	Position	Destination
Kahlil Tate	DB	Austin Peay
Trent Cakerice	DT	Central (IA)
Rusty VanWetzinga IV	LB	Central Michigan
Joey VanWetzinga	DL	Central Michigan
Judah Mallette	WR	Drake
Cade McNamara	QB	East Tennessee State
Marco Lainez	QB	Elon
Kyson Van Vugt	OL	Fresno State
Mason Knipp	OL	Indiana State
Leshon Williams	RB	Kansas
Grant Leeper	TE	Miami (OH)
John Nestor	DB	Minnesota
Gavin Hoffman	TE	Missouri
Ethan Aghakhan	DE	New Hampshire
Graham Friedrichsen	WR	Northern Iowa
Grant Glausser	RB	Northern Iowa
Ryan Kuennen	DL	Northern Iowa
Cole Marsh	TE	Northern Iowa
Ayden Price	WR	Northern Iowa
Chase Brackney	DE	Sacramento State
Jeff Bowie	DL	South Dakota
Caden Crawford	DL	South Dakota
Graham Eben	LB	South Dakota State
Reese Osgood	WR	South Dakota State
Jalyn Thompson	LB	South Dakota State
Tripp Woody	K	Syracuse
Brendan Sullivan	QB	Tulane
Kaleb Brown	WR	UAB
James Resar	QB	UNC Pembroke
Johnny Pascuzzi	TE	West Virginia
Amare Bickham	DB	Western Illinois
Max White	RB	Wyoming
CJ Leonard	WR	Unknown
Devan Van Ness	LB	Unknown

==== Incoming ====
Player	Position	Previous school
Hank Brown	QB	Auburn
Bryant Worrell	LS	Boston College
Jonah Pace	DL	Central Michigan
Sam Phillips	WR	Chattanooga
Bryce George	OL	Ferris State
George Nahas	IOL	Iowa State
Ty Hudkins	DB	Purdue
Shahid Barros	DB	South Dakota
Mark Gronowski	QB	South Dakota State
Bryce Hawthorne	DL	South Dakota State
Jeremy Hecklinski	QB	Wake Forest

== Schedule ==
Date	Time	Opponent	Rank	Site	TV	Result	Attendance
August 30	5:00 p.m.	Albany*		Kinnick Stadium; Iowa City, IA	FS1	W 34–7	69,250
September 6	11:00 a.m.	at No. 16 Iowa State*		Jack Trice Stadium; Ames, IA (Cy-Hawk Trophy, Big Noon Kickoff)	FOX	L 13–16	61,500
September 13	6:30 p.m.	UMass*		Kinnick Stadium; Iowa City, IA	BTN	W 47–7	69,250
September 19	7:00 p.m.	at Rutgers		SHI Stadium; Piscataway, NJ	FOX	W 38–28	55,942
September 27	2:30 p.m.	No. 11 Indiana^{†}		Kinnick Stadium; Iowa City, IA	Peacock	L 15–20	69,250
October 11	6:00 p.m.	at Wisconsin		Camp Randall Stadium; Madison, WI (Heartland Trophy)	FS1	W 37–0	76,064
October 18	6:00 p.m.	Penn State		Kinnick Stadium; Iowa City, IA	Peacock	W 25–24	69,250
October 25	2:30 p.m.	Minnesota		Kinnick Stadium; Iowa City, IA (Floyd of Rosedale)	CBS	W 41–3	69,250
November 8	2:30 p.m.	No. 9 Oregon	No. 20	Kinnick Stadium; Iowa City, IA (Big Noon Kickoff)	CBS	L 16–18	69,250
November 15	2:30 p.m.	at No. 17 USC	No. 21	Los Angeles Memorial Coliseum; Los Angeles, CA	BTN	L 21–26	65,216
November 22	2:30 p.m.	Michigan State		Kinnick Stadium; Iowa City, IA	FS1	W 20–17	69,250
November 28	11:00 a.m.	at Nebraska		Memorial Stadium; Lincoln, NE (Heroes Game)	CBS	W 40–16	86,410
December 31	11:00 a.m.	vs. No. 14 Vanderbilt*	No. 23	Raymond James Stadium; Tampa, FL (ReliaQuest Bowl)	ESPN	W 34–27	35,382
*Non-conference game; ^{†}Homecoming; Rankings from AP Poll (and CFP Rankings, after November 4) - Released prior to game; All times are in Central time; Source:

== Rankings ==
Ranking movements Legend: ██ Increase in ranking ██ Decrease in ranking — = Not ranked RV = Received votes
	Week																
Poll	Pre	1	2	3	4	5	6	7	8	9	10	11	12	13	14	15	Final
AP	RV	—	—	—	—	—	—	—	—	RV	RV	RV	RV	RV	RV	RV	17
Coaches	RV	RV	RV	—	RV	RV	RV	RV	RV	RV	24	RV	RV	RV	RV	RV	17
CFP	Not released										20	21	—	—	23	23	Not released

== Game summaries ==
=== Albany (FCS) ===
After a sluggish first 20 minutes of play, the Hawkeyes running game came alive and the defense settled in. The 34–7 victory tied Kirk Ferentz with Woody Hayes in overall wins as a Big Ten coach (205).

Albany Great Danes (FCS) (0–0) at Iowa Hawkeyes (0–0) – Game summary

Quarter	1	2	3	4	Total
Great Danes (FCS)	0	7	0	0	7
Hawkeyes	3	14	7	10	34

at Kinnick Stadium • Iowa City, Iowa

- Date: August 30
- Game time: 5:15 p.m. CDT
- Game weather: 78 °F (26 °C), Sunny, Wind E 8 mph (13 km/h)
- Game attendance: 69,250
- Referee: Jim Wharrie
- TV announcers (FS1): Eric Collins (play-by-play) and Spencer Tillman (analyst)
- Box score

Game information

First quarter

- 8:51 IOWA – Drew Stevens 28-yard field goal (Drive: 13 plays, 55 yards, 6:09; Iowa 3–0)

Second quarter

- 11:33 ALB – Lasalle Rose Jr. 9-yard pass from Jack Shields (James Bozek kick) (Drive: 13 plays, 55 yards, 6:09; Albany 7–3)
- 7:28 IOWA – Xavier Williams 3-yard run (Drew Stevens kick) (Drive: 7 plays, 65 yards, 4:05; Iowa 10–7)
- 1:51 IOWA – Kaden Wetjen 2-yard pass from Mark Gronowski (Drew Stevens kick) (Drive: 7 plays, 61 yards, 2:49; Iowa 17–7)

Third quarter

- 5:27 IOWA – Mark Gronowski 1-yard run (Drew Stevens kick) (Drive: 14 plays, 60 yards, 8:28; Iowa 24–7)

Fourth quarter

- 14:18 IOWA – Drew Stevens 55-yard field goal (Drive: 10 plays, 49 yards, 4:58; Iowa 27–7)
- 3:42 IOWA – Hank Brown 1-yard run (Drew Stevens kick) (Drive: 12 plays, 66 yards, 6:54; Iowa 34–7)

Statistics	ALB	IOWA
First downs	9	20
Plays–yards	47–177	69–358
Rushes–yards	21–43	53–310
Passing yards	134	48
Passing: comp–att–int	13–26–0	9–16–0
Turnovers	0	1
Time of possession	23:23	36:37

Team	Category	Player	Statistics
Albany	Passing	Jack Shields	13/26, 134 yards, TD
Albany	Rushing	Jack Shields	12 carries, 30 yards
Albany	Receiving	Caden Burti	3 receptions, 56 yards
Iowa	Passing	Mark Gronowski	8/15, 44 yards, TD
Iowa	Rushing	Xavier Williams	11 carries, 122 yards, TD
Iowa	Receiving	Jacob Gill	1 reception, 13 yards

=== at No. 16 Iowa State (Cy–Hawk Trophy) ===
The Hawkeyes never led in this game and lost for the first time in seven tries at Jack Trice Stadium. Iowa is now 1–5 when Fox Big Noon Kickoff is on site.

Iowa Hawkeyes (1–0) at No. 16 Iowa State Cyclones (2–0) – Game summary

Quarter	1	2	3	4	Total
Hawkeyes	0	10	3	0	13
No. 16 Cyclones	6	7	0	3	16

at Jack Trice Stadium • Ames, Iowa

- Date: September 6
- Game time: 11:10 a.m.
- Game weather: Sunny • Temperature: 60 °F (16 °C) • Wind: NW at 8 miles per hour (13 km/h)
- Game attendance: 61,500
- Referee: Kole Knueppel
- TV announcers (FOX): Gus Johnson (play-by-play), Joel Klatt (analyst), and Jenny Taft (sideline)
- Box score

Game information

First quarter

- ISU - Kyle Konrardy 44-yard field goal, 8:42. Cyclones 3–0. Drive: 8 plays, 29 yards, 3:59.
- ISU - Kyle Konrardy 27-yard field goal, 3:18. Cyclones 6–0. Drive: 10 plays, 67 yards, 3:51.

Second quarter

- IOWA - Drew Stevens 31-yard field goal, 12:53. Cyclones 6–3. Drive: 5 plays, 21 yards, 2:10.
- ISU - Benjamin Brahmer 2-yard pass from Rocco Becht (Kyle Konrardy kick), 4:50. Cyclones 13–3. Drive: 5 plays, 18 yards, 2:45.
- IOWA – Mark Gronowski 2-yard run (Drew Stevens kick), 0:27. Cyclones 13–10. Drive: 16 plays, 85 yards, 4:16.

Third quarter

- IOWA – Drew Stevens 36-yard field goal, 4:28. Tied 13–13. Drive: 16 plays, 77 yards, 9:28.

Fourth quarter

- ISU – Kyle Konrardy 54-yard field goal, 1:54. Cyclones 16–13. Drive: 13 plays, 55 yards, 6:29.

Statistics	IOWA	ISU
First downs	16	14
Plays–yards	63–214	57–238
Rushes–yards	39–131	30–104
Passing yards	83	134
Passing: comp–att–int	13–24–1	18–27–0
Turnovers	1	1
Time of possession	31:08	28:52

Team	Category	Player	Statistics
Iowa	Passing	Mark Gronowski	13/24, 83 yards, INT
Iowa	Rushing	Jaziun Patterson	11 carries, 60 yards
Iowa	Receiving	Jacob Gill	5 receptions, 52 yards
Iowa State	Passing	Rocco Becht	18/27, 134 yards, TD
Iowa State	Rushing	Abu Sama III	12 carries, 47 yards
Iowa State	Receiving	Brett Eskildsen	2 receptions, 39 yards

=== UMass ===
This was Iowa's last game before the conference schedule and their first-ever meeting with UMass. The victory moved Kirk Ferentz into first place in overall wins as a Big Ten football coach. The Hawkeyes came out inspired, scoring touchdowns on their first three possessions. Kaden Wetjen returned a punt 95 yards at the beginning of the third quarter, effectively putting the game out of reach for the Minutemen in a 47–7 rout. Wetjen earned Big Ten Special Teams Player of the Week for his performance.

UMass Minutemen (0–2) at Iowa Hawkeyes (1–1) – Game summary

Quarter	1	2	3	4	Total
Minutemen	0	7	0	0	7
Hawkeyes	20	10	10	7	47

at Kinnick Stadium • Iowa City, Iowa

- Date: September 13
- Game time: 6:40 p.m.
- Game weather: 93 °F (34 °C), Sunny, Wind SW 6 mph (9.7 km/h)
- Game attendance: 69,250
- Referee: Jeff Servinski
- TV announcers (BTN): Mark Followill (play-by-play), Anthony Herron (analyst), and Dannie Rogers (sideline)
- Box score

Game information

First quarter

- IOWA - Seth Anderson 20-yard pass from Mark Gronowski (Drew Stevens kick), 13:29. Hawkeyes 7–0. Drive: 3 plays, 68 yards, 1:25.
- IOWA - Seth Anderson 3-yard pass from Mark Gronowski (Drew Stevens kick missed), 7:41. Hawkeyes 13–0. Drive: 7 plays, 39 yards, 3:32.
- IOWA - Kaden Wetjen 20-yard run (Drew Stevens kick), 2:08. Hawkeyes 20–0. Drive: 7 plays, 52 yards, 3:25.

Second quarter

- MASS - Grant Jordan 6-yard run (Derek Morris kick), 11:50. Hawkeyes 20–7. Drive: 4 plays, 21 yards, 2:20.
- IOWA - Drew Stevens 54-yard field goal, 9:50. Hawkeyes 23–7. Drive: 6 plays, 30 yards, 1:53.
- IOWA - Mark Gronowski 13-yard run (Drew Stevens kick), 0:26. Hawkeyes 30–7. Drive: 7 plays, 49 yards, 1:02.

Third quarter

- IOWA - Kaden Wetjen 95-yard punt return (Drew Stevens kick), 2:21. Hawkeyes 37–7.
- IOWA - Drew Stevens 27-yard field goal, 2:58. Hawkeyes 40–7. Drive: 16 plays, 61 yards, 8:11.

Fourth quarter

- IOWA - KJ Parker 2-yard pass from Hank Brown (Drew Stevens kick), 11:04. Hawkeyes 47–7. Drive: 10 plays, 57 yards, 4:05.

Statistics	MASS	IOWA
First downs	8	22
Plays–yards	49–119	71–435
Rushes–yards	27–26	40–201
Passing yards	93	234
Passing: comp–att–int	13–22–0	21–31–0
Turnovers	0	0
Time of possession	27:56	32:04

Team	Category	Player	Statistics
UMass	Passing	AJ Hairston	4/8, 56 yards
UMass	Rushing	Rocko Griffin	10 carries, 28 yards
UMass	Receiving	Jacquon Gibson	5 receptions, 37 yards
Iowa	Passing	Mark Gronowski	16/24, 179 yards, 2 TD
Iowa	Rushing	Nathan McNeil	10 carries, 56 yards
Iowa	Receiving	Sam Phillips	3 receptions, 75 yards

=== at Rutgers ===
The Hawkeyes opened Big Ten play under the lights on a Friday night in Piscataway. The teams raced out to a 21-point tie in the first 22 minutes. The game pace slowed, and Iowa blocked a crucial field goal as they pulled away in the fourth quarter. Kirk Ferentz maintained his unblemished record when facing the Scarlet Knights (5–0). Kaden Wetjen, who opened the game with a 100-yard kickoff return for a touchdown, earned Big Ten Special Teams recognition for the second consecutive week.

Iowa Hawkeyes (2–1) at Rutgers Scarlet Knights (3–0) – Game summary

Quarter	1	2	3	4	Total
Hawkeyes	14	7	0	17	38
Scarlet Knights	14	7	0	7	28

at SHI Stadium • Piscataway, New Jersey

- Date: September 19
- Game time: 7:05 p.m.
- Game weather: Clear • Temperature: 75 °F (24 °C) • Wind: NW at 5 miles per hour (8.0 km/h)
- Game attendance: 55,942
- Referee: Jason Nickleby
- TV announcers (FOX): Connor Onion (play-by-play), Mark Helfrich (analyst), and Jen Hale (sideline)
- Box score

Game information

First quarter

- IOWA - Kaden Wetjen 100-yard kickoff return (Drew Stevens kick), 14:48. Hawkeyes 7–0.
- RUTG - Antwan Raymond 5-yard run (Jai Patel kick), 12:39. Tied 7–7. Drive: 6 plays, 75 yards, 2:09.
- RUTG - Athan Kaliakmanis 4-yard run (Jai Patel kick), 6:03. Rutgers 14–7. Drive: 12 plays, 63 yards, 5:31.
- IOWA - Kamari Moulton 6-yard run (Drew Stevens kick), 2:24. Tied 14–14. Drive: 6 plays, 75 yards, 3:39.

Second quarter

- RUTG - Athan Kaliakmanis 1-yard run (Jai Patel kick), 12:07. Rutgers 21–14. Drive: 9 plays, 75 yards, 5:17.
- RUTG - Mark Gronowski 2-yard run (Drew Stevens kick), 8:00. Tied 21–21. Drive: 7 plays, 73 yards, 4:08.

Third quarter

- No scoring plays.

Fourth quarter

- IOWA - Drew Stevens 26-yard field goal, 14:02. Hawkeyes 24–21. Drive: 10 plays, 69 yards, 4:44.
- RUTG - Antwan Raymond 1-yard run (Jai Patel kick), 9:44. Rutgers 28–24. Drive: 9 plays, 75 yards, 4:18.
- IOWA - Mark Gronowski 2-yard run (Drew Stevens kick), 5:39. Hawkeyes 31–28. Drive: 7 plays, 80 yards, 3:55.
- IOWA - Mark Gronowski 1-yard run (Drew Stevens kick), 2:14. Hawkeyes 38–28. Drive: 6 plays, 35 yards, 2:04.

Statistics	IOWA	RUTG
First downs	22	20
Plays–yards	56–346	70–400
Rushes–yards	38–160	30–70
Passing yards	186	330
Passing: comp–att–int	12–18–0	24–40–1
Turnovers	0	1
Time of possession	28:54	31:06

Team	Category	Player	Statistics
Iowa	Passing	Mark Gronowski	12/18, 186 yards
Iowa	Rushing	Kamari Moulton	14 carries, 68 yards, TD
Iowa	Receiving	Dayton Howard	1 reception, 42 yards
Rutgers	Passing	Athan Kaliakmanis	24/40, 330 yards, INT
Rutgers	Rushing	Antwan Raymond	18 carries, 62 yards, 2 TD
Rutgers	Receiving	Ian Strong	8 receptions, 151 yards

=== No. 11 Indiana ===
Indiana, boasting the #3 scoring offense (54.8) and #5 scoring defense (8.3) in the country, defeated Iowa for the first time since 2012. The Hawkeyes faltered in the fourth quarter and Indiana took advantage with a 49-yard touchdown pass with 1:28 remaining. Iowa had won nine of the last ten games in this series.

No. 11 Indiana Hoosiers (4–0) at Iowa Hawkeyes (3–1) – Game summary

Quarter	1	2	3	4	Total
No. 11 Hoosiers	7	3	0	10	20
Hawkeyes	3	7	0	5	15

at Kinnick Stadium • Iowa City, Iowa

- Date: September 27
- Game time: 2:35 p.m.
- Game weather: Sunny • Temperature: 85 °F (29 °C) • Wind: SW at 10 miles per hour (16 km/h)
- Game attendance: 69,250
- Referee: Greg Blum
- TV announcers (Peacock): Paul Burmeister (play-by-play), Phil Simms (analyst), and Caroline Pineda (sideline)
- Box score

Game information

First quarter

- IU – Omar Cooper Jr. 14-yard pass from Fernando Mendoza (Nico Radicic kick), 13:33. Hoosiers 7–0. 2 plays, 24 yards, 0:43.
- IOWA – Drew Stevens 40-yard field goal, 6:25. Hoosiers 7–3. 5 plays, 23 yards, 2:17.

Second quarter

- IOWA – Mark Gronowski 3-yard run (Drew Stevens kick), 0:22. Hawkeyes 10–7. 11 plays, 73 yards, 5:31.
- IU – Nico Radicic 46-yard field goal, 0:03. Tied 10–10. 3 plays, 47 yards, 0:19.

Third quarter

- No scoring plays.

Fourth quarter

- IOWA – Drew Stevens 54-yard field goal, 12:43. Hawkeyes 13–10. 5 plays, 11 yards, 2:13.
- IU – Nico Radicic 44-yard field goal, 9:47. Tied 13–13. 8 plays, 49 yards, 2:56.
- IU – Elijah Sarratt 49-yard pass from Fernando Mendoza (Nico Radicic kick), 1:28. Hoosiers 20–13. 5 plays, 76 yards, 0:33.
- IOWA – Fernando Mendoza tackled in the end zone for a safety, 0:00. Hoosiers 20–15.

Statistics	IU	IOWA
First downs	18	17
Plays–yards	62–337	69–284
Rushes–yards	39–104	31–92
Passing yards	233	192
Passing: comp–att–int	13–23–1	24–38–2
Turnovers	1	2
Time of possession	27:18	32:42

Team	Category	Player	Statistics
Indiana	Passing	Fernando Mendoza	13/23, 233 yards, 2 TD, INT
Indiana	Rushing	Roman Hemby	15 carries, 86 yards
Indiana	Receiving	Elijah Sarratt	6 receptions, 132 yards, TD
Iowa	Passing	Mark Gronowski	19/25, 144 yards, INT
Iowa	Rushing	Kamari Moulton	18 carries, 75 yards
Iowa	Receiving	Sam Phillips	5 receptions, 64 yards

=== at Wisconsin (rivalry) ===
Iowa won its fourth consecutive games in this series for the first time in two decades (2002–2005), and blanked Wisconsin at Camp Randall Stadium for the first time in 96 years. The Hawkeyes capitalized on three Badger turnovers in the first half. Iowa was able to run at will as this was the most lopsided win for the Hawkeyes since 1968 against the Badgers. The Hawkeyes have outscored Wisconsin 79–10 in the last two matchups.

Iowa Hawkeyes (3–2) at Wisconsin Badgers (2–3) – Game summary

Quarter	1	2	3	4	Total
Hawkeyes	17	6	7	7	37
Badgers	0	0	0	0	0

at Camp Randall Stadium • Madison, Wisconsin

- Date: October 11
- Game time: 6:05 p.m.
- Game weather: 65 °F (18 °C), Sunny, Wind E 6 mph (9.7 km/h)
- Game attendance: 76,064
- Referee: Chris Coyte
- TV announcers (FS1): Eric Collins (play-by-play) and Spencer Tillman (analyst)
- Box score

Game information

First quarter

- IOWA – Drew Stevens 32-yard field goal, 4:33. Hawkeyes 3–0. 11 plays, 66 yards, 5:29.
- IOWA – Kamari Moulton 6-yard run (Drew Stevens kick), 2:33. Hawkeyes 10–0. 3 plays, 24 yards, 1:19.
- IOWA – Mark Gronowski 1-yard run (Drew Stevens kick), 1:30. Hawkeyes 17–0. 1 play, 1 yard, 0:15.

Second quarter

- IOWA – Drew Stevens 25-yard field goal, 8:44. Hawkeyes 20–0. 9 plays, 22 yards, 5:26.
- IOWA – Drew Stevens 49-yard field goal, 0:00. Hawkeyes 23–0. 9 plays, 63 yards, 1:40.

Third quarter

- IOWA – Xavier Williams 29-yard run (Drew Stevens kick), 10:34. Hawkeyes 30–0. 5 plays, 59 yards, 2:25.

Fourth quarter

- IOWA – Xavier Williams 19-yard run (Drew Stevens kick), 7:25. Hawkeyes 37–0. 10 plays, 46 yards, 4:38.

Statistics	IOWA	WIS
First downs	18	12
Plays–yards	61–319	57–209
Rushes–yards	36–210	36–127
Passing yards	109	82
Passing: comp–att–int	18–25–1	8–21–2
Turnovers	1	3
Time of possession	31:15	28:45

Team	Category	Player	Statistics
Iowa	Passing	Mark Gronowski	17/24, 107 yards, INT
Iowa	Rushing	Kamari Moulton	15 carries, 96 yards, TD
Iowa	Receiving	Kamari Moulton	3 receptions, 29 yards
Wisconsin	Passing	Hunter Simmons	8/21, 82 yards, 2 INT
Wisconsin	Rushing	Dilin Jones	16 carries, 69 yards
Wisconsin	Receiving	Lance Mason	1 reception, 29 yards

=== Penn State ===
The Hawkeyes battled an emotional Penn State team who was playing their first game just days after the firing of head coach James Franklin. Both teams had success running the football, but Iowa popped a few more big plays and outlasted the Nittany Lions. The Hawkeyes' third win in the last four games in the series sent Penn State to 0–4 in Big Ten play. Senior defensive back Xavier Nwankpa earned Big Ten Defensive Player of the Week for his performance against Penn State.

Penn State Nittany Lions (3–3) at Iowa Hawkeyes (4–2) – Game summary

Quarter	1	2	3	4	Total
Nittany Lions	7	7	7	3	24
Hawkeyes	3	7	6	9	25

at Kinnick Stadium • Iowa City, Iowa

- Date: October 18
- Game time: 6:08 p.m.
- Game weather: 70 °F (21 °C), Cloudy, Wind NW 9 mph (14 km/h)
- Game attendance: 69,250
- Referee: Francisco Villar
- TV announcers (Peacock): Paul Burmeister (play-by-play), Michael Robinson (analyst), and Caroline Pineda (sideline)
- Box score

Game information

First quarter

- PSU – Kaytron Allen 1-yard run (Ryan Barker kick), 8:45. Nittany Lions 7–0. 10 plays, 35 yards, 5:26.
- IOWA – Drew Stevens 39-yard field goal, 4:24. Nittany Lions 7–3. 9 plays, 54 yards, 4:21.

Second quarter

- IOWA – Mark Gronowski 1-yard run (Drew Stevens kick), 1:14. Hawkeyes 10–7. 2 plays, 1 yard, 0:14.
- PSU – Elliot Washington II 35-yard blocked field goal return (Ryan Barker kick), 0:00. Nittany Lions 14–10. 0:06.

Third quarter

- PSU – Kaytron Allen 8-yard run (Ryan Barker kick), 9:25. Nittany Lions 21–10. 10 plays, 75 yards, 5:35.
- IOWA – Mark Gronowski 4-yard run (pass failed), 4:19. Nittany Lions 21–16. 8 plays, 74 yards, 4:59.

Fourth quarter

- IOWA – Drew Stevens 31-yard field goal, 13:17. Nittany Lions 21–19. 5 plays, 27 yards, 1:55.
- PSU – Ryan Barker 32-yard field goal, 4:56. Nittany Lions 24–19. 16 plays, 61 yards, 8:21.
- IOWA – Kaden Wetjen 8-yard run (pass failed), 3:54. Hawkeyes 25–24. 2 plays, 75 yards, 1:02.

Statistics	PSU	IOWA
First downs	19	11
Plays–yards	74–266	49–313
Rushes–yards	46–173	33–245
Passing yards	93	68
Passing: comp–att–int	15–28–2	10–16–1
Turnovers	2	1
Time of possession	36:12	23:48

Team	Category	Player	Statistics
Penn State	Passing	Ethan Grunkemeyer	15/28, 93 yards, 2 INT
Penn State	Rushing	Kaytron Allen	28 carries, 145 yards, 2 TD
Penn State	Receiving	Trebor Peña	3 receptions, 19 yards
Iowa	Passing	Mark Gronowski	10/16, 68 yards, INT
Iowa	Rushing	Mark Gronowski	9 carries, 130 yards, 2 TD
Iowa	Receiving	Kaden Wetjen	2 receptions, 21 yards

=== Minnesota (Floyd of Rosedale) ===
Minnesota has not won consecutive games at Kinnick Stadium in nearly 45 years (1981). Iowa dominated the first half, scoring in all three phases of the game. This was the most lopsided game in the series since 2008 as the Gophers never had momentum. The victory once again brought the Hawkeyes to bowl eligibility.

Minnesota Golden Gophers (5–2) at Iowa Hawkeyes (5–2) – Game summary

Quarter	1	2	3	4	Total
Golden Gophers	0	0	3	0	3
Hawkeyes	17	14	3	7	41

at Kinnick Stadium • Iowa City, Iowa

- Date: October 25
- Game time: 2:40 p.m.
- Game weather: 55 °F (13 °C), Cloudy, Wind SE 10 mph (16 km/h)
- Game attendance: 69,250
- Referee: Kole Knueppel
- TV announcers (CBS): Brad Nessler (play-by-play), Gary Danielson (analyst), and Jenny Dell (sideline)
- Box score

Game information

First quarter

- IOWA – Mark Gronowski 2-yard run (Drew Stevens kick), 10:06. Hawkeyes 7–0. 9 plays, 75 yards, 4:54.
- IOWA – Drew Stevens 34-yard field goal, 3:19. Hawkeyes 10–0. 10 plays, 46 yards, 5:04.
- IOWA – Zach Lutmer 34-yard interception return (Drew Stevens kick), 2:57. Hawkeyes 17–0. 1 play, 0:17.

Second quarter

- IOWA – Reece Vander Zee 29-yard pass from Mark Gronowski (Drew Stevens kick), 13:33. Hawkeyes 24–0. 5 plays, 45 yards, 2:55.
- IOWA – Kaden Wetjen 50-yard punt return (Drew Stevens kick), 11:23. Hawkeyes 31–0.

Third quarter

- IOWA – Drew Stevens 46-yard field goal, 4:06. Hawkeyes 34–0. 6 plays, 20 yards, 3:40.
- MINN – Brady Denaburg 34-yard field goal, 0:03. Hawkeyes 34–3. 10 plays, 59 yards, 4:03.

Fourth quarter

- IOWA – Jeremy Hecklinski 6-yard run (Drew Stevens kick), 5:30. Hawkeyes 41–3. 5 plays, 21 yards, 2:39.

Statistics	MINN	IOWA
First downs	10	13
Plays–yards	53–133	56–274
Rushes–yards	25–24	36–133
Passing yards	109	141
Passing: comp–att–int	16–28–3	13–20–0
Turnovers	3	0
Time of possession	26:50	33:10

Team	Category	Player	Statistics
Minnesota	Passing	Drake Lindsey	16/28, 109 yards, 3 INT
Minnesota	Rushing	Xavier Ford	8 carries, 25 yards
Minnesota	Receiving	Le'Meke Brockington	6 receptions, 54 yards
Iowa	Passing	Mark Gronowski	12/19, 135 yards, TD
Iowa	Rushing	Kamari Moulton	15 carries, 75 yards
Iowa	Receiving	Kaden Wetjen	3 receptions, 49 yards

=== No. 9 Oregon ===
Fox Big Noon Kickoff was on hand for this top 20 showdown. These teams had only played each other three times prior and this was their first meeting in over 30 years. Rain was a factor as both teams struggled passing. Iowa took their first lead of the game at 16–15 with 1:51 remaining. But, in their first visit to Iowa City since 1989, Oregon prevailed with a field goal, 18–16.

No. 9 Oregon Ducks (7–1) at No. 20 Iowa Hawkeyes (6–2) – Game summary

Quarter	1	2	3	4	Total
No. 9 Ducks	2	10	3	3	18
No. 20 Hawkeyes	0	7	0	9	16

at Kinnick Stadium • Iowa City, Iowa

- Date: November 8
- Game time: 2:42 p.m. CST
- Game weather: 42 °F (6 °C), Rain, Wind N 7 mph (11 km/h)
- Game attendance: 69,250
- Referee: Jeff Servinski
- TV announcers (CBS): Brad Nessler (play-by-play), Gary Danielson (analyst), and Jenny Dell (sideline)
- Box score

Game information

First quarter

- ORE – Safety, 9:55. Ducks 2–0.

Second quarter

- ORE – Dierre Hill Jr 19-yard run (Atticus Sappington kick), 11:46. Ducks 9–0. 8 plays, 82 yards, 4:00.
- IOWA – DJ Vonnahme 3-yard pass from Mark Gronowski (Drew Stevens kick), 5:43. Ducks 9–7. 10 plays, 75 yards, 6:03.
- ORE – Atticus Sappington 46-yard field goal, 0:00. Ducks 12–7. 8 plays, 52 yards, 1:43.

Third quarter

- ORE – Atticus Sappington 40-yard field goal, 0:44. Ducks 15–7. 9 plays, 65 yards, 6:02.

Fourth quarter

- IOWA – Drew Stevens 58-yard field goal, 12:39. Ducks 15–10. 7 plays, 35 yards, 3:05.
- IOWA – Mark Gronowski 3-yard run (Wetjen pass from Gronowski failed), 1:51. Hawkeyes 16–15. 12 plays, 93 yards, 6:45.
- ORE – Atticus Sappington 39-yard field goal, 0:03. Ducks 18–16. 10 plays, 54 yards, 1:48.

Statistics	ORE	IOWA
First downs	19	18
Plays–yards	57–373	61–239
Rushes–yards	36–261	43–101
Passing yards	112	138
Passing: comp–att–int	13–21–1	10–18–0
Turnovers	1	2
Time of possession	26:40	33:20

Team	Category	Player	Statistics
Oregon	Passing	Dante Moore	13/21, 112 yards, INT
Oregon	Rushing	Noah Whittington	17 carries, 118 yards
Oregon	Receiving	Jamari Johnson	4 receptions, 36 yards
Iowa	Passing	Mark Gronowski	10/18, 138 yards, TD
Iowa	Rushing	Kamari Moulton	23 carries, 87 yards
Iowa	Receiving	DJ Vonnahme	2 receptions, 43 yards, TD

=== at No. 17 USC ===
Playing at Los Angeles Memorial Coliseum for the first time since 1976, the Hawkeyes took control early before stalling out down the stretch. For the second consecutive week rain was a factor but Iowa drove the ball effectively in the first half, leading 21–10 at intermission. USC outscored Iowa 16–0 in the second half to keep their College Football Playoff hopes alive. Senior Mark Gronowski became the first Hawkeye to have rushing, receiving, and passing touchdowns in the same game in over 30 years. This was the first meeting of the schools since the 2019 Holiday Bowl. Iowa's last win at the Coliseum remains 1961, and The Trojans have an 8–3 advantage in the overall series.

No. 21 Iowa Hawkeyes (6–3) at No. 17 USC Trojans (7–2) – Game summary

Quarter	1	2	3	4	Total
No. 21 Hawkeyes	7	14	0	0	21
No. 17 Trojans	0	10	9	7	26

at Los Angeles Memorial Coliseum • Los Angeles, California

- Date: November 15
- Game time: 2:41 p.m. CST
- Game weather: 61 °F (16 °C), Rain, Wind SE 8 mph (13 km/h)
- Game attendance: 65,216
- Referee: Chris Coyte
- TV announcers (BTN): Rhett Lewis (play-by-play), Yogi Roth (analyst), and Dannie Rogers (sideline)
- Box score

Game information

First quarter

- (11:26) IOWA - Dayton Howard 2-yard pass from Mark Gronowski (Drew Stevens kick), (Drive: 7 plays, 69 yards, 3:29; Iowa 7-0)

Second quarter

- (14:12) IOWA - Mark Gronowski 1-yard run (Drew Stevens kick), (Drive: 9 plays, 45 yards, 5:47; Iowa 14-0)
- (9:15) USC - Bryan Jackson 1-yard run (Ryon Sayeri kick), (Drive: 11 plays, 75 yards, 4:57; Iowa 14-7)
- (3:24) IOWA - Mark Gronowski 5-yard pass from Reece Vander Zee (Drew Stevens kick), (Drive: 9 plays, 75 yards, 5:51; Iowa 21-7)
- (0:39) USC - Ryon Sayeri 40-yard field goal, (Drive: 8 plays, 52 yards, 2:45; Iowa 21-10)

Third quarter

- (11:11) USC - Ryon Sayeri 28-yard field goal, (Drive: 9 plays, 70 yards, 3:46; Iowa 21-13)
- (3:33) USC - Makai Lemon 12-yard pass from Jayden Maiava (Two-Point Conversion pass to Makai Lemon from Jayden Maiava is no good), (Drive: 9 plays, 82 yards, 4:16; Iowa 21-19)

Fourth quarter

- (13:36) USC - Bryan Jackson 1-yard run (Ryon Sayeri kick), (Drive: 6 plays, 40 yards, 3:18; USC 26-21)

Statistics	IOWA	USC
First downs	17	21
Plays–yards	53–320	63–360
Rushes–yards	33–183	31–106
Passing yards	137	254
Passing: comp–att–int	13–20–1	23–32–0
Turnovers	1	0
Time of possession	30:44	29:16

Team	Category	Player	Statistics
Iowa	Passing	Mark Gronowski	12/19, 132 yards, TD, INT
Iowa	Rushing	Kamari Moulton	15 carries, 90 yards
Iowa	Receiving	DJ Vonnahme	4 receptions, 59 yards
USC	Passing	Jayden Maiava	23/32, 254 yards, TD
USC	Rushing	King Miller	19 carries, 83 yards
USC	Receiving	Makai Lemon	10 receptions, 153 yards, TD

=== Michigan State ===
With a first quarter 62-yard punt return for a touchdown, Kaden Wetjen broke a Tim Dwight return touchdown record from almost three decades prior. The Hawkeyes offense stalled for most of the first three quarters, but woke up in the fourth. Senior Drew Stevens kicked a 44-yard field goal in his final home game for the nail-biting win. Michigan State has only won at Kinnick Stadium twice in the last 30 years (2011, 2013). Wetjen was named Big Ten Special Teams Player of the Week for a third time.

Michigan State Spartans (3–7) at Iowa Hawkeyes (6–4) – Game summary

Quarter	1	2	3	4	Total
Spartans	0	3	14	0	17
Hawkeyes	7	0	0	13	20

at Kinnick Stadium • Iowa City, Iowa

- Date: November 22
- Game time: 2:35 p.m. CST
- Game weather: 54 °F (12 °C), Sunny, Wind SW 13 mph (21 km/h)
- Game attendance: 69,250
- Referee: Mark Kluczynski
- TV announcers (FS1): Connor Onion (play-by-play) and Mark Helfrich (analyst)
- Box score

Game information

First quarter

- IOWA – Kaden Wetjen 62-yard punt return (Drew Stevens kick), 3:38. Hawkeyes 7–0.

Second quarter

- MSU – Martin Connington 27-yard field goal, 2:54. Hawkeyes 7–3. 14 plays, 78 yards, 6:19.

Third quarter

- MSU – Chrishon McCray 45-yard pass from Alessio Milivojevic (Martin Connington kick), 8:58. Spartans 10–7. 2 plays, 38 yards, 1:13.
- MSU – Chrishon McCray 5-yard pass from Alessio Milivojevic (Martin Connington kick), 1:13. Spartans 17–7. 11 plays, 80 yards, 5:35.

Fourth quarter

- IOWA – Drew Stevens 26-yard field goal, 11:27. Spartans 17–10. 14 plays, 78 yards, 6:19.
- IOWA – Jacob Gill 13-yard pass from Mark Gronowski (Drew Stevens kick), 1:29. Tied 17–17. 5 plays, 42 yards, 1:08.
- IOWA – Drew Stevens 44-yard field goal, 0:00. Hawkeyes 20–17. 5 plays, 53 yards, 0:41.

Statistics	MSU	IOWA
First downs	19	16
Plays–yards	69–335	61–301
Rushes–yards	27–80	39–154
Passing yards	255	147
Passing: comp–att–int	25–42–1	12–22–1
Turnovers	1	2
Time of possession	29:31	28:41

Team	Category	Player	Statistics
Michigan State	Passing	Alessio Milivojevic	25/42, 255 yards, 2 TD, INT
Michigan State	Rushing	Brandon Tullis	8 carries, 56 yards
Michigan State	Receiving	Jack Velling	8 receptions, 88 yards
Iowa	Passing	Mark Gronowski	12/22, 147 yards, TD, INT
Iowa	Rushing	Kamari Moulton	18 carries, 78 yards
Iowa	Receiving	Reece Vander Zee	2 receptions, 46 yards

=== at Nebraska (rivalry) ===
The Hawkeyes have won 10 of the last 11 in this trophy series. The Cornhuskers were also out for revenge as they gave away the last two match-ups on last-minute turnovers. This marked the 15th Heroes Game with Iowa holding an 11–4 advantage as well as earning their seventh consecutive victory in Lincoln. After a back-and-forth first half, the Hawkeyes shut out the Cornhuskers in the second to get the most lopsided win in the series since 2017. Mark Gronowski also broke the Iowa single-season quarterback rushing record (491).

Iowa Hawkeyes (7–4) at Nebraska Cornhuskers (7–4) – Game summary

Quarter	1	2	3	4	Total
Hawkeyes	10	14	9	7	40
Cornhuskers	10	6	0	0	16

at Memorial Stadium • Lincoln, Nebraska

- Date: November 28
- Game time: 11:08 a.m. CST
- Game weather: 26 °F (−3 °C), Cloudy, Wind E 10 mph (16 km/h)
- Game attendance: 86,410
- Referee: Jeff Servinski
- TV announcers (CBS): Rich Waltz (play-by-play), Ross Tucker (analyst) and Tiffany Blackmon (sideline)
- Box score

Game information

First quarter

- NEB – Emmett Johnson 1-yard run (Kyle Cunanan kick), 10:40. Cornhuskers 7–0. 4 plays, 90 yards, 1:47.
- IOWA – Drew Stevens 41-yard field goal, 8:49. Cornhuskers 7–3. 4 plays, 6 yards, 1:41.
- IOWA – DJ Vonnahme 35-yard pass from Mark Gronowski (Drew Stevens kick), 5:35. Hawkeyes 10–7. 3 plays, 51 yards, 1:37.
- NEB – Kyle Cunanan 31-yard field goal, 1:13. Tied 10–10. 11 plays, 62 yards, 4:22.

Second quarter

- NEB – Kyle Cunanan 29-yard field goal, 13:53. Huskers 13–10. 6 plays, 15 yards, 2:20.
- IOWA – Kamari Moulton 3-yard run (Drew Stevens kick), 8:13. Hawkeyes 17–13. 10 plays, 75 yards, 5:40.
- NEB – Kyle Cunanan 35-yard field goal, 2:53. Hawkeyes 17–16. 10 plays, 56 yards, 5:14.
- IOWA – Mark Gronowski 1-yard run (Drew Stevens kick), 0:37. Hawkeyes 24–16. 9 plays, 75 yards, 2:16.

Third quarter

- IOWA – Safety, 11:16. Hawkeyes 26–16. 5 plays, 12 yards, 3:44.
- IOWA – Mark Gronowski 6-yard run (Drew Stevens kick), 4:47. Hawkeyes 33–16. 7 plays, 71 yards, 3:51.

Fourth quarter

- IOWA – Kamari Moulton 1-yard run (Drew Stevens kick), 13:40. Hawkeyes 40–16. 9 plays, 63 yards, 4:34.

Statistics	IOWA	NEB
First downs	18	14
Plays–yards	62–379	60–300
Rushes–yards	46–213	36–231
Passing yards	166	69
Passing: comp–att–int	9–16–0	9–24–0
Turnovers	1	1
Time of possession	33:20	26:40

Team	Category	Player	Statistics
Iowa	Passing	Mark Gronowski	9/16, 166 yards, TD
Iowa	Rushing	Kamari Moulton	18 carries, 93 yards, 2 TD
Iowa	Receiving	DJ Vonnahme	3 receptions, 91 yards, TD
Nebraska	Passing	TJ Lateef	9/24, 69 yards
Nebraska	Rushing	Emmett Johnson	29 carries, 217 yards, TD
Nebraska	Receiving	Emmett Johnson	2 receptions, 22 yards

=== vs No. 14 Vanderbilt (ReliaQuest Bowl) ===
In this first-ever meeting of the two schools, the Hawkeyes' victory gave Kirk Ferentz the record for most bowl game wins as a Big Ten coach (11). Iowa started fast, scoring a touchdown on a two-minute opening drive and benefitted from an illegal punt by Vandy right before halftime. The Commodores rallied in the second half behind Heisman runner-up Diego Pavia, but Mark Gronowski threw for two touchdowns and ran for another to earn his 58th victory as a college quarterback. Drew Stevens capped his Hawkeye career with two field goals, providing some margin while adding to his school record for made field goals.

2025 ReliaQuest Bowl
No. 23 Iowa Hawkeyes (8–4) vs. No. 14 Vanderbilt Commodores (10–2) – Game summary

Quarter	1	2	3	4	Total
No. 23 Hawkeyes	7	7	10	10	34
No. 14 Commodores	0	3	14	10	27

at Raymond James Stadium • Tampa, FL

- Date: December 31
- Game time: 11:00 a.m. CST
- Game weather: 53 °F (12 °C), Sunny, Wind NW 6 mph (9.7 km/h)
- Game attendance: 35,382
- Referee: Nate Black (ACC)
- TV announcers (ESPN): Roy Philpott (play-by-play), Sam Acho (analyst) and Taylor Davis (sideline)

Game information

First quarter

- IOWA – Kamari Moulton 4-yard run (Drew Stevens kick), 12:55. Hawkeyes 7–0. 5 plays, 72 yards, 2:00.

Second quarter

- VAN – Brock Taylor 41-yard field goal, 7:49. Hawkeyes 7–3. 13 plays, 59 yards, 7:05.
- IOWA – Reece Vander Zee 10-yard pass from Mark Gronowski (Drew Stevens kick), 0:41. Hawkeyes 14–3. 1 play, 10 yards, 0:04.

Third quarter

- IOWA – DJ Vonnahme 21-yard pass from Mark Gronowski (Drew Stevens kick), 8:50. Hawkeyes 21–3. 6 plays, 58 yards, 3:18.
- VAN – Tre Richardson 75-yard pass from Diego Pavia (Brock Taylor kick), 8:37. Hawkeyes 21–10. 1 play, 75 yards, 0:09.
- IOWA – Drew Stevens 47-yard field goal, 3:54. Hawkeyes 24–10. 4 plays, 9 yards, 1:29.
- VAN – Joseph McVay 16-yard pass from Diego Pavia (Brock Taylor kick), 1:41. Hawkeyes 24–17. 8 plays, 70 yards, 2:06.

Fourth quarter

- IOWA – Mark Gronowski 1-yard run (Drew Stevens kick), 13:35. Hawkeyes 31–17. 5 plays, 72 yards, 2:00.
- VAN – Diego Pavia 11-yard run (Brock Taylor kick), 11:19. Hawkeyes 31–24. 5 plays, 72 yards, 2:00.
- IOWA – Drew Stevens 44-yard field goal, 4:13. Hawkeyes 34–24. 13 plays, 41 yards, 7:06.
- VAN – Brock Taylor 37-yard field goal, 2:58. Hawkeyes 34–27. 7 plays, 60 yards, 1:10.

Statistics	IOWA	VAN
First downs	19	21
Plays–yards	59–379	60–398
Rushes–yards	37–167	22–51
Passing yards	212	347
Passing: comp–att–int	16–22–1	25–38–0
Turnovers	1	0
Time of possession	32:13	27:37

Team	Category	Player	Statistics
Iowa	Passing	Mark Gronowski	16/22, 212 yards, 2 TD, INT
Iowa	Rushing	Kamari Moulton	14 carries, 95 yards, TD
Iowa	Receiving	DJ Vonnahme	7 receptions, 146 yards, TD
Vanderbilt	Passing	Diego Pavia	25/38, 347 yards, 2 TD
Vanderbilt	Rushing	Diego Pavia	15 carries, 36 yards, TD
Vanderbilt	Receiving	Tre Richardson	6 receptions, 127 yards, TD

== Roster ==
2025 Iowa Hawkeyes football team roster
Players
Coaches
Offense

Pos.	#	Name	Class
WR	0	Jarriett Buie	So
WR	1	K. J. Parker	Fr
WR	2	Sam Phillips	Sr
QB	3	Jimmy Sullivan	Fr
RB	4	Jaziun Patterson	Jr
WR	5	Jacob Gill	GS
WR	6	Seth Anderson	Sr
WR	7	Dayton Howard	So
QB	9	Hank Brown	So
QB	10	Jeremy Hecklinski	Fr
QB	11	Mark Gronowski	Sr
WR	13	Terrence Smith	Fr
TE	14	Mason Woods	Fr
WR	15	Reece Vander Zee	So
QB	16	Ryan Fitzgerald	Fr
WR	17	Alex Eichmann	Jr
WR	21	Kaden Wetjen	GS
RB	22	Braeden Jackson	Fr
RB	23	Brevin Doll	Fr
RB	25	Nathan McNeil	Fr
RB	26	Xavier Williams	Sr
RB	28	Kamari Moulton	So
TE	48	Zach Ortwerth	Jr
OL	52	Will Hahn	Fr
OL	53	Michael Myslinski	Sr
OL	58	Kade Pieper	So
OL	59	Trevor Lauck	So
OL	60	Lucas Allgeyer	Fr
OL	61	Cael Winter	So
OL	63	Josh Janowski	Fr
OL	64	Leighton Jones	So
OL	65	Logan Jones	GS
OL	67	Gennings Dunker	Sr
OL	68	Will Nolan	Fr
OL	70	Beau Stephens	Sr
OL	71	Jack Dotzler	Jr
OL	72	Kale Krogh	Jr
OL	74	Bodey McCaslin	Fr
OL	75	Cannon Leonard	So
OL	77	George Nahas	So
OL	79	Bryce George	GS
TE	80	Michael Burt	Fr
TE	81	DJ Vonnahme	Fr
WR	82	Dylan Stecker	Fr
WR	83	Jackson Naeve	So
WR	84	Apollo Payne	Fr
TE	85	Thomas Meyer	Fr
TE	86	Eli Johnson	Fr
TE	87	Addison Ostrenga	Sr
TE	88	Hayden Large	GS

Defense

Pos.	#	Name	Class
DB	1	Xavier Nwankpa	Sr
DB	2	TJ Hall	Sr
DB	3	Jaylen Watson	So
DB	4	Koen Entringer	Jr
DB	5	Shahid Barros	GS
DB	6	Zach Lutmer	So
DB	7	Rashad Godfrey Jr.	Fr
DB	8	Deshaun Lee	Jr
LB	10	Burke Gautcher	Fr
DB	11	Jacob Wallace	Fr
LB	12	Jaxon Rexroth	GS
DE	13	Drew Campbell	Fr
DB	14	Alex Mota	So
LB	15	Carson Cooney	Fr
DB	16	O'Lontae Dean	Fr
DB	17	Teegan Davis	So
DB	18	C. J. Bell Jr.	Fr
DB	19	Kyler Gerardy	Fr
DB	20	Ty Hudkins
DB	21	Watts McBride	So
LB	22	Derek Weisskopf	Fr
LB	23	Landyn Van Kekerix	Jr
LB	25	Kelby Telander	Sr
DB	26	Kael Kolarik	Jr
DB	30	Rayce Heitman	Fr
LB	31	Nolan DeLong	So
LB	33	Cam Buffington	Fr
DB	34	Drew MacPherson	Fr
LB	36	Jayden Montgomery	Jr
DE	40	Chima Chineke	Fr
LB	41	Jaden Harrell	GS
LB	42	Zach Twedt	GS
LB	43	Karson Sharar	Sr
DL	44	Kenneth Merrieweather	So
LB	46	Preston Ries	Fr
LB	47	Jack Laughlin	So
DL	48	Max Llewellyn	Sr
DL	49	Ethan Hurkett	GS
DL	50	Will Lockhart	Fr
DL	51	Luke Gaffney	Jr
DL	55	Jeremiah Pittman	GS
DL	56	Maddux Borcherding-Johnson	So
DL	57	Will Hubert	Jr
DE	84	Joseph Anderson	Fr
DE	90	Brian Allen	Jr
DL	91	Jonah Pace	Sr
DL	94	Brad Fitzgibbon	Fr
DL	95	Aaron Graves	Sr
DL	96	Bryce Hawthorne	So
DL	97	Iose Epenesa	Fr
DL	99	Devan Kennedy	Fr

Special teams

Pos.	#	Name	Class
P	9	Rhys Dakin	So
K	18	Drew Stevens	Sr
LS	45	Bryant Worrell	GS
K	92	Caden Buhr	Fr
LS	97	Ike Speltz	Fr
P	99	Ty Nissen	Sr

Head coach

- Kirk Ferentz

Coordinators/assistant coaches

- Seth Wallace – Assistant head coach/Assistant defensive coordinator/linebackers
- Tim Lester – Offensive coordinator/quarterbacks
- Phil Parker – Defensive coordinator/secondary
- LeVar Woods – Special teams coordinator
- George Barnett Offensive line
- Kelvin Bell – Defensive line
- Omar Young – Running backs
- Jon Budmayr – Wide receivers
- Abdul Hodge – Tight ends/fullbacks
- Jay Niemann – Assistant defensive line/defensive recruiting coordinator
- Warren Ruggiero - Senior offensive analyst
- Raimond Braithwaite – Director, strength and conditioning
- Drew Heitland – Assistant, strength and conditioning
- Kohle Helle – Assistant, strength and conditioning
- Cody Myers – Assistant, strength and conditioning
- Allan Reyes – Strength and conditioning specialist
- Tyler Barnes – Chief of Staff/General Manager
- Paul Federici – Director, Football Operations

Legend

- (C) Team captain
- (S) Suspended
- (I) Ineligible
- Injured
- Redshirt

Roster
Last update: 09/01/2025

== Awards and honors ==
Individual Awards
Player/Coach	Award	Ref.
Logan Jones	Rimington Trophy; Unanimous All-American	
Kaden Wetjen	Rodgers–Dwight Return Specialist of the Year; Consensus All-American	
Offensive line	Joe Moore Award	

== Players drafted into the NFL ==
Round	Pick	Player	Position	NFL Club
2	57	Logan Jones	C	Chicago Bears
3	96	Gennings Dunker	T	Pittsburgh Steelers
4	121	Kaden Wetjen	WR	Pittsburgh Steelers
5	148	Beau Stephens	OG	Seattle Seahawks
6	183	Karson Sharar	LB	Arizona Cardinals
7	219	TJ Hall	CB	New Orleans Saints
7	238	Max Llewellyn	DE	Miami Dolphins
