= Osseo Water Tower =

- U.S. National Register of Historic Places
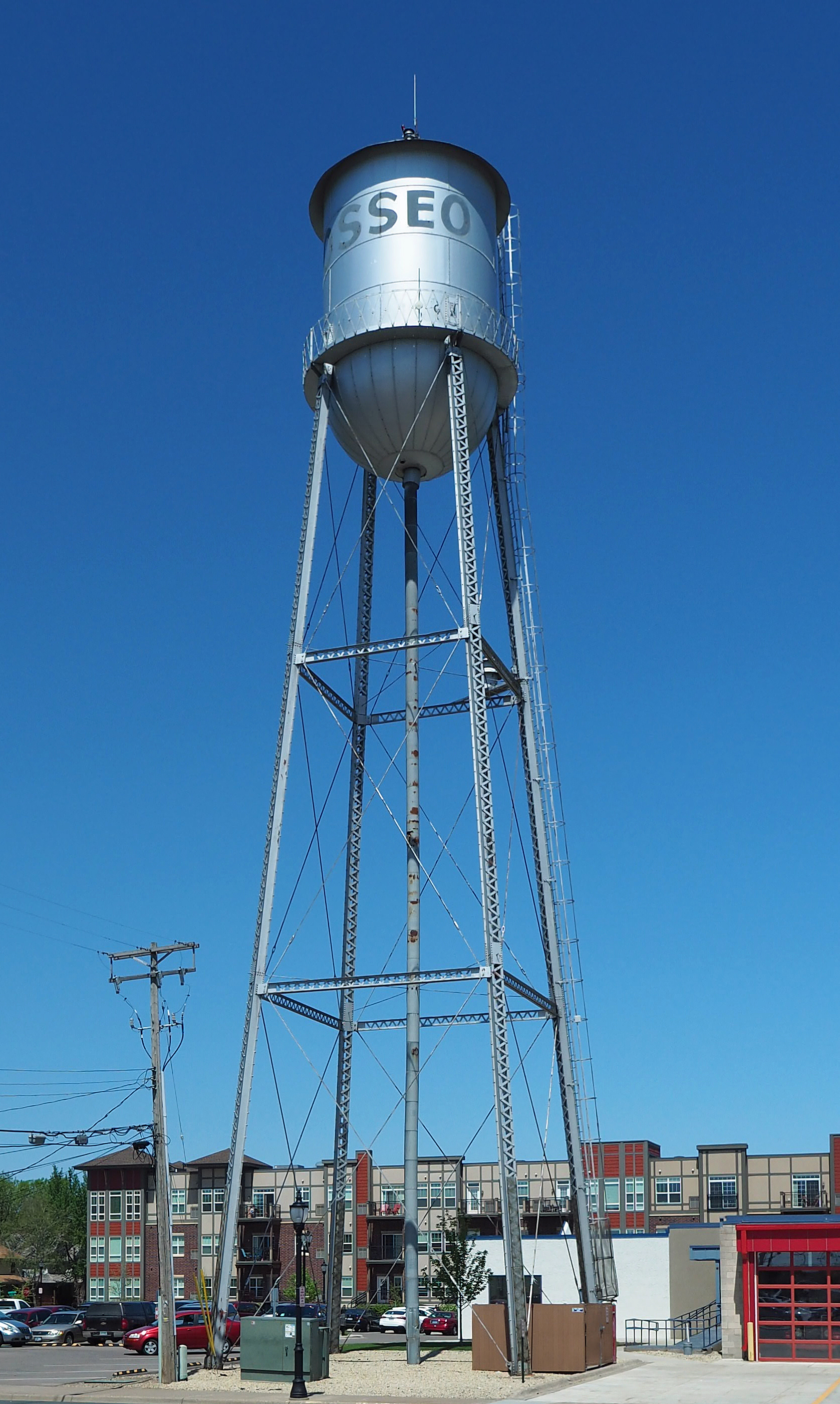
- The Osseo Water Tower from the southeast

- Location within Minnesota Location within the United States
- Location: Osseo, Minnesota
- Coordinates: 45°7′14″N 93°24′10.2″W
- Area: less than one acre
- Built: 1915
- Built by: Minneapolis Steel and Machinery Co.
- Architectural style: Hemispherical tank, steel water tower
- NRHP reference No.: 100001023
- Added to NRHP: June 5, 2017

The Osseo Water Tower in Osseo, Minnesota, is an historic water tower listed in the National Register of Historic Places on June 5, 2017. It was listed for its historical significance to community planning and development in Osseo, because it promoted better fire fighting, provided fresh water to homes and businesses, and supported the growth of the community. It is also architecturally significant because hemispherical-bottom water towers, built from about the 1890s to about 1940, are rapidly being replaced by larger-capacity towers.

Osseo residents and the Village Council had been discussing the establishment of a water works since about 1900. At that time, fire protection was only available with a bucket brigade, or with hand-pumped wells that each required six men to pump enough water to produce a strong stream. In 1914, the Osseo Commercial Club actively organized to bring water and electrical service to the village. They promoted the significant savings on fire insurance, the decreased risk of property loss, and the fact that water and electric service would bring more businesses to Osseo. The village council heard a petition on December 28, 1914, with a proposal to issue $20,000 in bonds to build a water works plant and an electric plant. The village held an election on January 12, 1915, and both the power plant and water plant propositions passed with a sound majority. On May 4, 1915, the village council received bids for construction, which began around July 21. The village prepared a celebration, the Osseo Light and Water Carnival, which was billed as “The Greatest Municipal Prosperity and Improvement Celebration in the History of Northern Hennepin County.” The water system was pronounced completed on November 24, 1915. The Commercial Club then spurred the formal creation of the Osseo Fire Department, which further helped reduce fire insurance rates.

During that period, the village was also a hub of potato harvesting from nearby farms. In 1914, an average of 150 train car loads of potatoes were being shipped out each day on the Great Northern Railway. Another development was the establishment of the Jefferson Highway, which came in 1916 and was routed along Central Avenue.

The City of Osseo considered demolishing the water tower in 2014 after learning that repairing it and removing lead paint would cost about $350,000. The Legacy Amendment funds provided $6,500 for the initial study. There are only seven remaining municipal water towers with a hemispherical bottom within 50 miles of Osseo: Elk River (whose tower is listed on the National Register), Hampton, Milaca, Robbinsdale, Minnetonka Beach, and Waconia. There had been at least 17 towers of this design within a 50-mile radius, and probably more. Most of those towers are in small communities in outlying areas. The nomination also notes that historic water towers are disappearing because of the expense of maintenance.
