= Kayode Awosika =

American football player (born 1998)

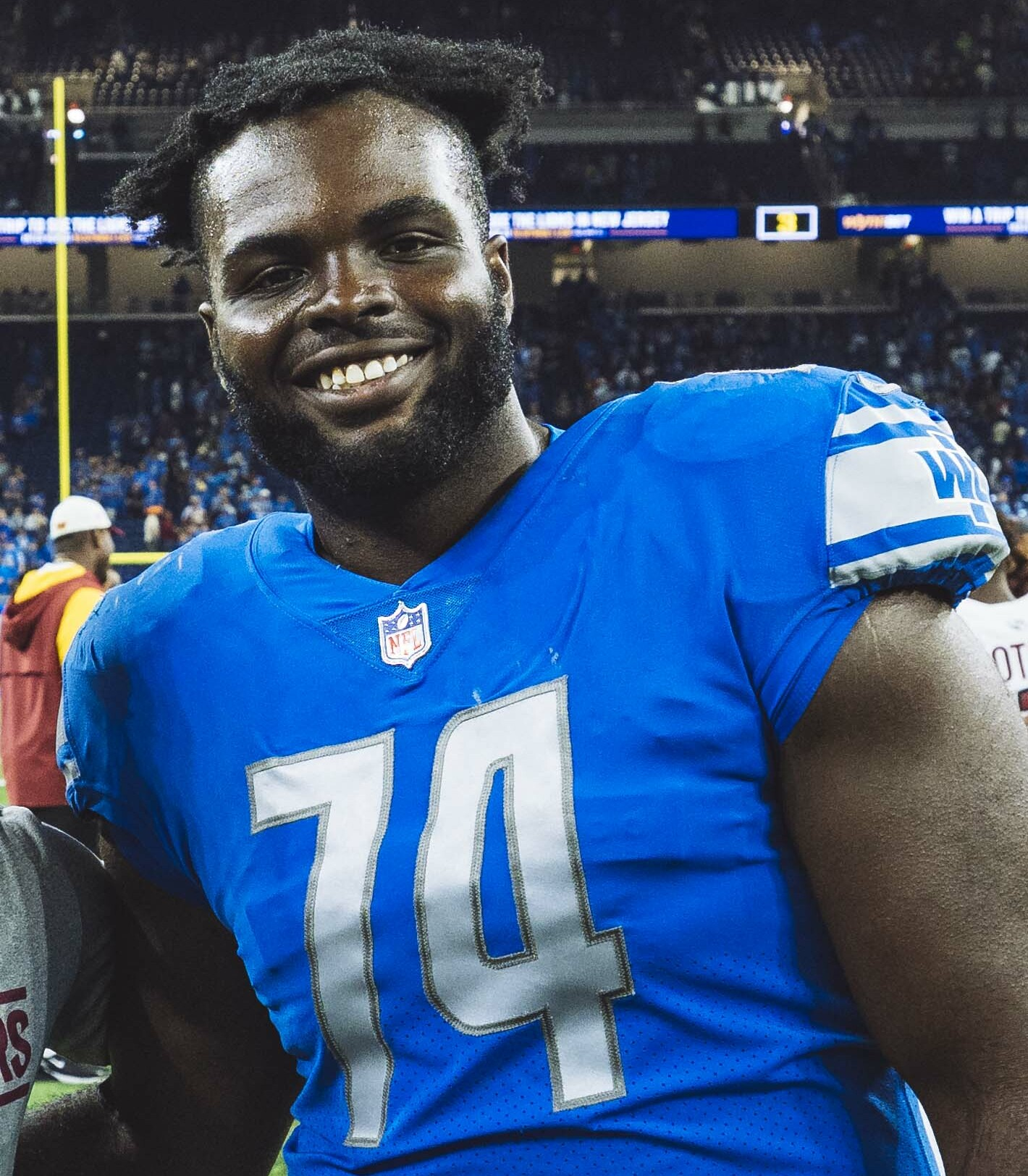
- Awosika with the Detroit Lions in 2022

No. 74 – Los Angeles Chargers
- Position: Guard
- Roster status: Active

Personal information
- Born: October 27, 1998 (age 28); Plymouth, Minnesota, U.S.
- Listed height: 6 ft 3 in (1.91 m)
- Listed weight: 312 lb (142 kg)

Career information
- High school: Maple Grove (Maple Grove, Minnesota)
- College: Buffalo (2017–2020)
- NFL draft: 2021: undrafted

Career history
- Philadelphia Eagles (2021–2022); Detroit Lions (2022–2025); Los Angeles Chargers (2026–present)

Awards and highlights
- Second-team All-American (2020); First-team All-MAC (2020); Second-team All-MAC (2019)

Career NFL statistics as of Week 5, 2026
- Games played: 52
- Games started: 13
- Stats at Pro Football Reference

Kayode Awosika (born October 27, 1998) is an American professional football guard for the Los Angeles Chargers of the National Football League (NFL). He played college football for the Buffalo Bulls and signed with the Philadelphia Eagles as an undrafted free agent in 2021.

== Early life ==
Kayode Awosika was born on October 27, 1998, in Plymouth, Minnesota, to Nigerian immigrants. He attended Maple Grove Senior High School, being named USA Today first-team All-Minnesota as a senior.

== Collegiate career ==
Awosika played college football for the University at Buffalo. He redshirted during his freshman year. In his redshirt-freshman year, he saw action in five games, as a reserve offensive tackle. He started all 14 games in his sophomore year and 11 games in his junior year. He was named team captain in his junior year and was named second-team All-Mid-American Conference (MAC). In his senior year, he started seven games, being named first-team All-MAC and a Football Writers Association of America second-team All-American. He chose to forgo remaining eligibility and instead declare for the NFL draft.

== Professional career ==
Pre-draft measurables
Height	Weight	Arm length	Hand span	Wingspan	40-yard dash	10-yard split	20-yard split	20-yard shuttle	Three-cone drill	Vertical jump	Broad jump	Bench press
6 ft 3 1/8 in (1.91 m)	307 lb (139 kg)	32 5/8 in (0.83 m)	9 in (0.23 m)	6 ft 7 in (2.01 m)	5.19 s	1.85 s	2.81 s	4.91 s	8.15 s	30.0 in (0.76 m)	8 ft 4 in (2.54 m)	28 reps
All values from Pro Day

=== Philadelphia Eagles ===
After going unselected in the 2021 NFL draft, Awosika signed as an undrafted free agent with the Philadelphia Eagles. He was given the second-most guaranteed money among the Eagles undrafted free agents, behind Jack Stoll. He was waived on August 31, 2021, and re-signed to the practice squad the next day. Awosika made his NFL debut on January 8, 2022, in the Eagles' week 18 game against the Dallas Cowboys. In doing so, he became the first Maple Grove High School alumnus to play in the NFL. He signed a reserve/future contract with the Eagles on January 18, 2022.

On August 30, 2022, Awosika was waived by the Eagles and signed to the practice squad the next day.

=== Detroit Lions ===
On September 15, 2022, Awosika was signed by the Detroit Lions off of the Eagles' practice squad. He was waived by Detroit on August 29, 2023, and was subsequently re-signed to the practice squad. On September 19, Awosika was signed to the active roster.

On March 28, 2025, Awosika re-signed with the Lions.

=== Los Angeles Chargers ===
On March 25, 2026, Awosika signed with the Los Angeles Chargers.
