= Osseo Area School District 279 =

School system in Minnesota, United States

Osseo Area Schools (District 279)

Location
- Minnesota United States

District information
- Type: Public School District
- Grades: Pre-K - 12
- Superintendent: Dr. Kim Hiel

Students and staff
- Students: Approx. 21,000

Other information
- Website: www.osseoschools.org

ISD 279-Osseo Area Schools is a school system in Hennepin County, Minnesota. ISD 279 provides public education from the primary to secondary levels in the following to parts of Brooklyn Center, Brooklyn Park, Maple Grove, Osseo, Plymouth, Corcoran, Dayton and Rogers. District 279 is the fifth largest district in Minnesota, with a student population of approximately 20,900 in 2019.

== Overview ==
Osseo Area Schools serves all of Osseo and parts of Brooklyn Center, Brooklyn Park, Corcoran, Dayton, Maple Grove, Rogers, and Plymouth. District 279 has 17 elementary schools (Pre-K-5), four middle schools (6-8), three high schools and an area learning center (9-12), and an online school (K-12).

A comprehensive PreK-12 school district, Osseo prepares students for college, post-secondary vocational training and the job market.

Elementary schools focus on reading and math achievement. Students also receive instruction in writing, research, science, social studies, physical education and the arts. Literacy in technology, media and information retrieval is taught within subject areas. Many schools offer a variety of programs such as preschool programs, Kidstop (School Aged Child Care), all-day kindergarten, multi-age classrooms and team teaching. Title 1 programs provide academic support to improve reading and math skills through an individualized plan for improvement. ELL (English Language Learning) programs provide services to students who need additional support with english learning to be successful in an educational environment.

The district's magnet school program offers value-added curriculum at three elementary schools: Birch Grove Elementary School for the Arts, Weaver Lake Elementary, a Science, Math, and Technology School, and Zanewood Community school, a Science, Technology, Engineering, Arts, and Math school. Brooklyn Middle School has a Science, Technology, Engineering, Arts, and Math program for their students. All students in Park Center Senior High (grades 9 and 10) participate in the International Baccalaureate Middle Years Programme, and students can apply for the International Baccalaureate Diploma Program in 11th and 12th grade. Osseo Senior High offers a health science program by application.

The middle schools offer middle-level programming designed to let students sample elective courses and advance according to aptitude. Senior highs offer more than 250 basic, advanced, online, and elective courses including calculus, advanced math and science classes. Each school provides four years of French and Spanish.

The district has made an effort to increase technology integration in the classroom. Over 85% of the classrooms have mounted projectors as this was determined to be important classroom equipment. Many classrooms have document cameras and classroom amplification systems to enhance learning. In additional, there is wireless internet access at all sites, providing a public network for students who bring their own technology devices for educational use (BYOD). To support integration of technology into instruction, staff development is provided through the C4 Model of Learning, which has received the ISTE (International Society for Technology in Education) Seal of Alignment. In the 2016-2017 school year, all 4th-12th grade students received iPads to integrate technology into the classroom.

Each school provides a wide variety of talented and gifted program services, from enrichment at elementary level to secondary-level advanced classes in English, math, science and social studies.

District 279's highly ranked Special Education program provides services from birth to high school graduation or age 22. Whenever possible, services are provided in regular classroom settings with children of the same age.

== Schools ==
Here is a complete list of schools in the Osseo Area School District 279 (from primary level to Secondary level, including magnet schools to educational learning and early childhood centers:

=== Early Childhood Centers ===
- Arbor View Early Childhood Center
- Willow Lane Early Childhood Center

=== Elementary schools ===
- Aspen Ridge Elementary School (2026)
- Basswood Elementary School (1995)
- Birch Grove Elementary School for the Arts (1966)
- Cedar Island Elementary School (1970)
- Edinbrook Elementary School (1988)
- Elm Creek Elementary School (1980)
- Fair Oaks Elementary School (1962)
- Fernbrook Elementary School (1988)
- Garden City Elementary School (1959)
- Oak View Elementary School (1991)
- Palmer Lake Elementary School (1964)
- Park Brook Elementary School (1959)
- Rice Lake Elementary School (1980)
- Rush Creek Elementary School (1995)
- Weaver Lake Elementary School: A Science, Math and Technology School (1991)
- Woodland Elementary School (2002)
- Zanewood Community School: A Science, Technology, Engineering, Arts and Math School (1967)

=== Middle schools ===
- Brooklyn Middle School: A Science, Technology, Engineering, Arts and Math School (1963)
- Maple Grove Middle School (1990)
- North View Middle School (1970)
- Osseo Middle School (1966)

=== Senior high schools ===
- Osseo Senior High School (1925)
- Park Center Senior High School: An International Baccalaureate World School (1971)
- Maple Grove Senior High School (1996)

=== Former schools ===
- Crest View Elementary School (1960–2025)
- Edgewood Elementary School: A Science, Math and Technology School (1961–2008)
- Orchard Lane Elementary School (1965–2002)
- Osseo Elementary School (1954–2008)

=== Educational Learning Centers ===
- Osseo Area Learning Center
- Osseo Education Center
- Osseo Enrollment Center
- Adult Basic Education Services at Northwest Family Service Center
- 279Online K-12 School
- Educational Service Center

== Leadership ==
The Independent School District 279 School Board describes itself as having "the duty of the care, management, and control of the public schools of the school district by the authority granted them in law." See Board of education for further details on the functions of a school board. The Minneapolis Board of Education has been granted the power to carry out such duties by the State of Minnesota and the Minnesota Legislature.

=== Current members ===
- Chair: Kelsey Dawson Walton
- Vice Chair: Jackie Mosqueda-Jones
- Treasurer: Tanya Simons
- Clerk: Heather Douglass
- Director: Thomas Brooks
- Director: Tamara Grady

=== Resignation of Robert Gerhart ===
Robert Gerhart, chairman of the school board, resigned after numerous citizens took screenshots of his public posts and comments on social media featuring racist and bigoted themes, and demanded his removal. The majority of posts and comments by Gerhart had been made months and years prior. They were discovered after Gerhart proposed, in a school board meeting, that the district could engage armed volunteers to patrol district schools. He'd had the idea, Gerhart said, for "years," but hadn't proposed it until then after, the Stoneman Douglas High School shooting, another of many mass school shootings across the country. Gerhart resigned a week after numerous parents, residents and groups contacted the district with evidence and complaints.

== District websites ==
=== Early Childhood Centers ===
- Early Childhood Family Education at Arbor View and Willow Lane
- Early Childhood Special Education at Arbor View and Willow Lane

=== Elementary schools ===
- Aspen Ridge Elementary School
- Basswood Elementary School
- Birch Grove Elementary School for the Arts
- Cedar Island Elementary School
- Edinbrook Elementary School
- Elm Creek Elementary School
- Fair Oaks Elementary School
- Fernbrook Elementary School
- Garden City Elementary School
- Oak View Elementary School
- Palmer Lake Elementary School
- Park Brook Elementary School
- Rice Lake Elementary School
- Rush Creek Elementary School
- Weaver Lake Elementary: A Science, Math and Technology School
- Woodland Elementary School
- Zanewood Community School: A Science, Technology, Engineering, Arts and Math School

=== Middle schools ===
- Brooklyn Middle School: A Science, Technology, Engineering, Arts and Math School
- Maple Grove Middle School
- North View Middle School
- Osseo Middle School

=== Senior high schools ===
- Osseo Senior High School
- Park Center Senior High School: An International Baccalaureate World School
- Maple Grove Senior High School

=== Educational Learning Centers ===
- Osseo Area Learning Center
- Osseo Education Center
- Osseo Enrollment Center
- Adult Basic Education Services at Northwest Family Service Center
- 279Online K-12 School
- Educational Service Center

=== Former schools (archived) ===
- Crest View Elementary School
- Edgewood Elementary School: A Science, Math and Technology School
- Osseo Elementary School

== See also ==
- List of school districts in Minnesota
