= Teresa Lynch =

American politician (born 1954)

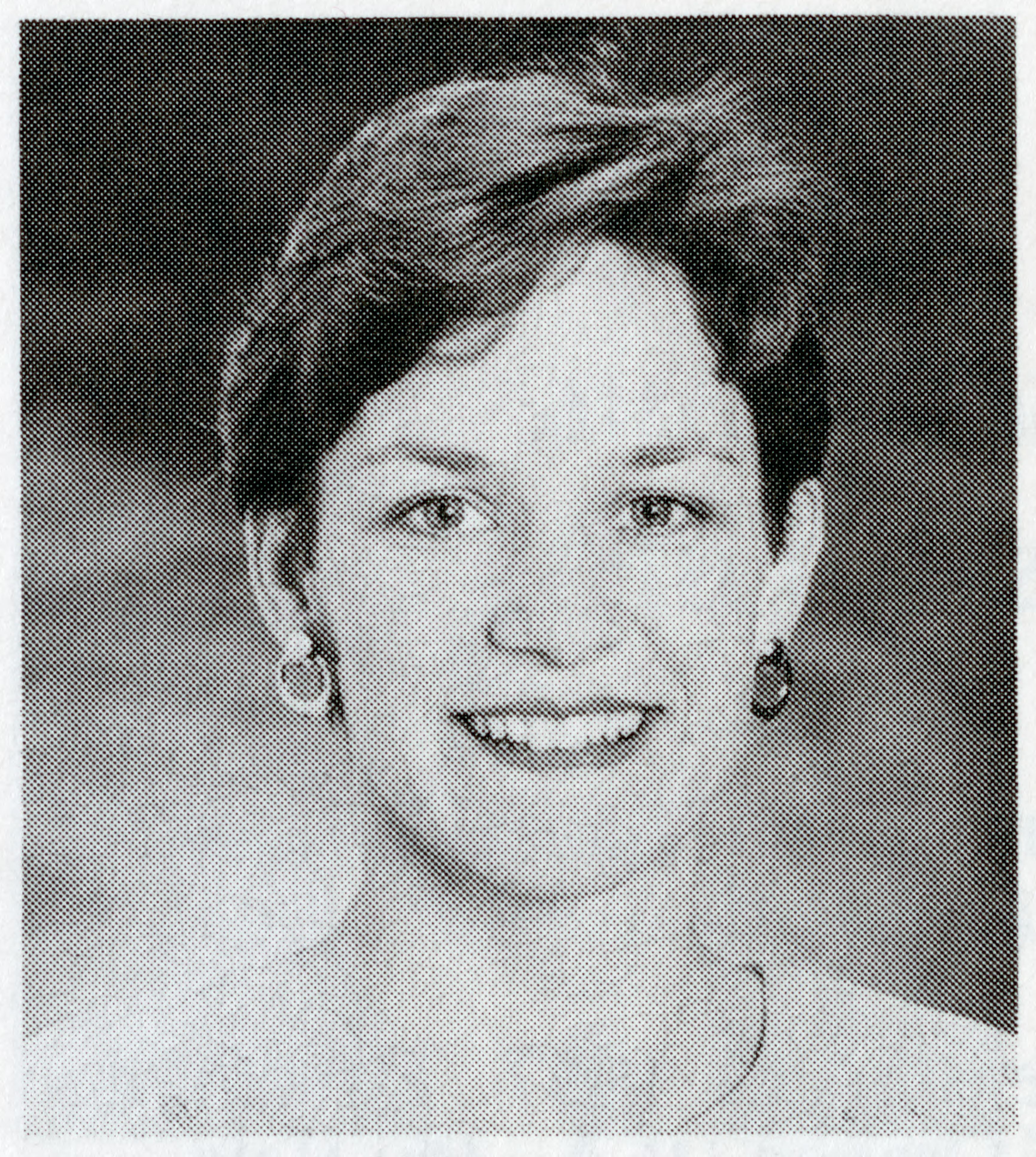

Member of the Minnesota House of Representatives from the 50A and 50B district
- In office 1989-1996
- Succeeded by: Kathy Tingelstad

Personal details
- Born: January 15, 1954 (age 72)
- Party: Republican Party of Minnesota
- Spouse: David
- Children: 4
- Education: Saint Paul College; Metropolitan State University
- Profession: Homemaker, Language interpretation

Teresa Lynch is a Minnesota politician and a former member of the Minnesota House of Representatives who represented District 50B, which primarily includes most of the city of Andover, Ramsey, Ham Lake and a portion of Blaine in Anoka County in the northern Twin Cities metropolitan area. Prior to the 1992 legislative redistricting, the area was known as District 50A, Lynch is a Republican.

Lynch was first elected in 1988, succeeding two-term Rep. Ernest A. Larsen.
