= Erin Koegel =

American politician (born 1982)

Member of the Minnesota House of Representatives
- Incumbent
- Assumed office January 3, 2017
- Preceded by: Jerry Newton
- Succeeded by: Aaron Klemz (elect)
- Constituency: District 39A (2023–present); District 37A (2017–2023)

Personal details
- Born: April 6, 1982 (age 44) Duluth, Minnesota, U.S.
- Party: Democratic (DFL)
- Spouse: Steve
- Children: 1
- Education: University of Minnesota, Duluth (BA)
- Website: State House website Campaign website

Erin Koegel (/ˈkeɪ̯.ɡəl/; born April 6, 1982) is an American politician serving in the Minnesota House of Representatives since 2017. A member of the Minnesota Democratic–Farmer–Labor Party (DFL), Koegel represents District 39A in the northern Twin Cities metropolitan area, which includes the city of Fridley and parts of Anoka and Ramsey Counties.

== Early life, education, and career ==
Koegel was born in Duluth, Minnesota, and grew up in Maple Grove, Minnesota. She graduated from Osseo High School in 2000, and from the University of Minnesota Duluth with a Bachelor of Applied Science in psychology and a minor in political science, and later a master's degree in advocacy and political leadership.

Koegel completed an internship with the Duluth City Council and worked as a page at the Minnesota House of Representatives. She works as a volunteer coordinator at Community Action Partnership of Ramsey County, and previously was executive director of the nonprofit Health Care for All.

== Minnesota House of Representatives ==
Koegel was elected to the Minnesota House of Representatives in 2016 and has been reelected every two years since. She first ran after three-term DFL incumbent Jerry Newton announced he would run for a seat in the Minnesota State Senate.

Koegel chairs the Sustainable Infrastructure Policy Committee and sits on the Commerce Finance and Policy and Transportation Finance and Policy Committees. From 2021 to 2022, she served as vice chair of the Transportation Finance and Policy Committee.

In November 2025, Koegel announced she would not seek reelection in 2026. She cited increased safety concerns after the assassination of DFL House Leader Melissa Hortman, the legislature's lack of transparency, and increasing polarization as factors in her decision to retire.

=== Health care and child care ===
Koegel supports extending the eligibility of MinnesotaCare, a public health care program for low-income families. She also supports increasing investments in child care, preschool, and financial assistance for those attending college. Koegel has spoken publicly about the difficulties of being a parent to a newborn child while in the legislature, including the lack of maternity or parental leave.

Koegel authored legislation to increase consumer protections and place limits on settlement-payment deals, requiring judges to scrutinize the payments. She was part of an advisory council on how to spend funding through Minnesota's opioid epidemic response law.

=== Transportation ===
Koegel supported legislation to increase the state's gas tax to keep up with inflation and increase dedicated funding for roads and bridges. She has also supported other tax increases to fund transportation needs, including a 75-cent fee on home deliveries as an alternative to the gas tax.

She sponsored bipartisan legislation to create speciality license plates commemorating the Minnesota Vikings and a bill that would allow teen drivers to take driver's education courses online. She authored legislation that would restrict wake boats within 200 feet of shore, and prohibit them in small lakes and waterways.

== Electoral history ==
2016 Minnesota State House - District 37A
Party	Candidate	Votes	%
Democratic (DFL)	Erin Koegel	9,485	47.17
Republican	Anthony Wilder	8,946	44.49
Libertarian	Brian McCormick	1,647	8.19
Write-in		31	0.15
Total votes		20,469	100.0
Democratic (DFL) hold			

2018 Minnesota State House - District 37A
Party	Candidate	Votes	%
Democratic (DFL)	Erin Koegel (incumbent)	9,816	56.01
Republican	Anthony Wilder	7,676	43.80
Write-in		35	0.20
Total votes		17,527	100.0
Democratic (DFL) hold			

2020 Minnesota State House - District 37A
Party	Candidate	Votes	%
Democratic (DFL)	Erin Koegel (incumbent)	12,389	55.10
Republican	Ken Wendling	10,070	44.78
Write-in		27	0.20
Total votes		22,486	100.0
Democratic (DFL) hold			

2022 Minnesota State House - District 39A
Party	Candidate	Votes	%
Democratic (DFL)	Erin Koegel (incumbent)	9,091	63.30
Republican	Rod Sylvester	5,262	36.64
Write-in		9	0.06
Total votes		14,362	100.0
Democratic (DFL) hold			

== Personal life ==
Koegel is married to her spouse, Steve, and resides in Spring Lake Park, Minnesota. Her daughter was born in 2018.

On August 22, 2021, Koegel accidentally severed her middle, ring, and little fingers on her left hand in a power saw accident. She was airlifted to the North Memorial Health Hospital in Robbinsdale, where she underwent emergency surgery. Surgeons were able to reattach her middle finger, but her ring and pinky fingers were lost. A GoFundMe page set up to support Koegel's recovery surpassed its goal of $5,000, but attracted the notice of officials when it appeared that many contributions came from lobbyists. Minnesota state law prohibits gifts from lobbyists to lawmakers worth more than $5. The GoFundMe page announced that gifts from lobbyists would be returned immediately.
