= Nash Jensen =

American football player (born 1999)

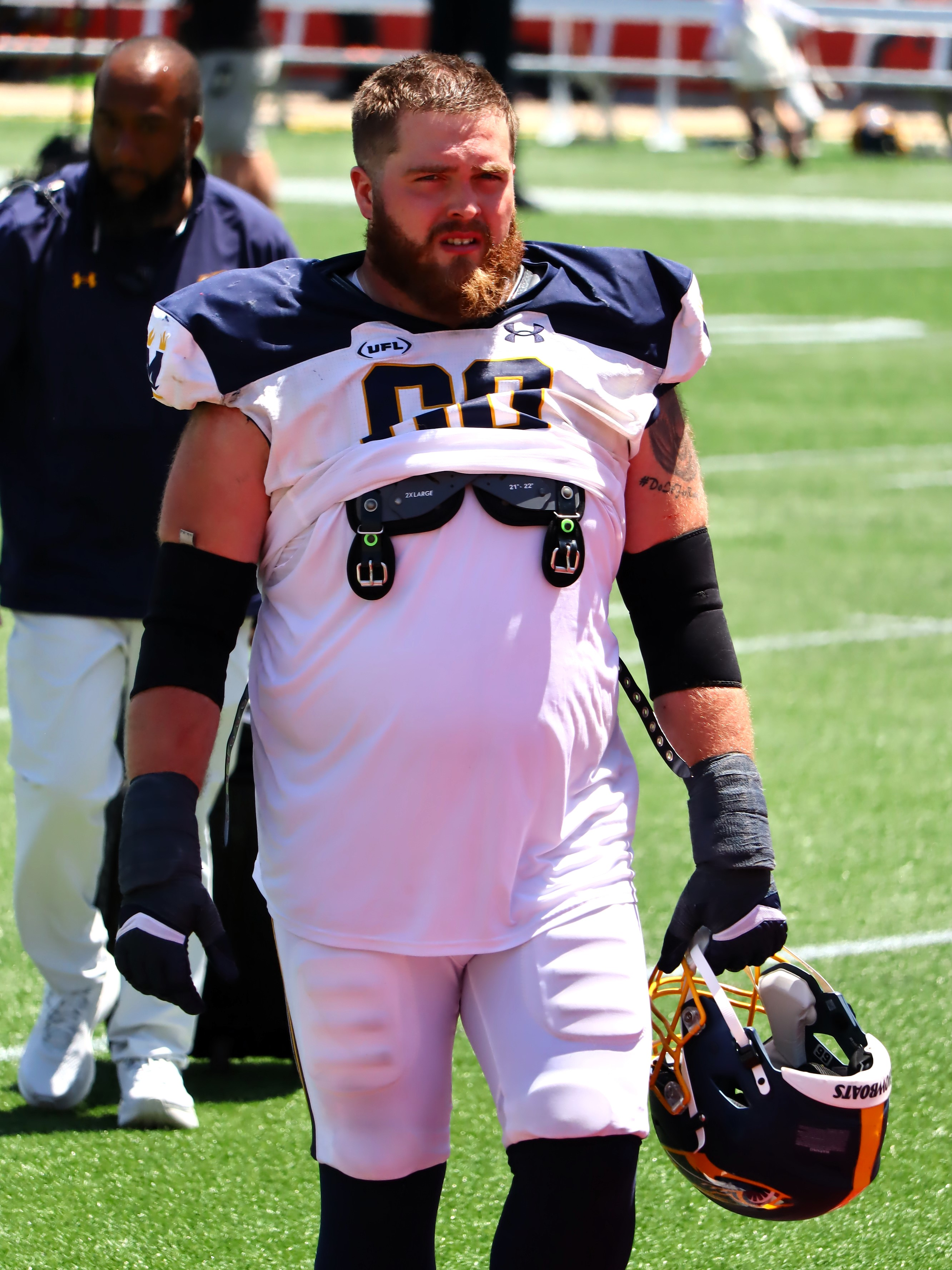
- Jensen in 2025

No. 66
- Position: Guard

Personal information
- Born: May 7, 1999 (age 27); Osseo, Minnesota, U.S.
- Listed height: 6 ft 4 in (1.93 m)
- Listed weight: 329 lb (149 kg)

Career information
- High school: Osseo Senior
- College: North Dakota State (2017–2022)
- NFL draft: 2023: undrafted

Career history
- Carolina Panthers (2023); Memphis Showboats (2025); Louisville Kings (2026)

Awards and highlights
- 4× FCS national champion (2017–2019, 2021); First-team FCS All-American (2022); First-team All-MFVC (2022)

Career NFL statistics as of 2023
- Games played: 11
- Games started: 5
- Stats at Pro Football Reference

Nash Jensen (born May 7, 1999) is an American former professional football player who was a guard in the National Football League (NFL). He played college football for the North Dakota State Bison, setting what is believed to be the National Collegiate Athletic Association (NCAA) record for games played with 70.

== Early life ==
Jensen was born on May 7, 1999, and grew up in Maple Grove, Minnesota. He attended Osseo Senior High School and was a versatile athlete, playing both basketball and football and seeing time at offensive tackle, guard, fullback, defensive tackle, center and tight end in the latter. He was rated a two-star recruit and committed to play college football for the North Dakota State Bison over several other offers.

== College career ==
As a true freshman at North Dakota State in 2017, Jensen redshirted as the Bison won the FCS national championship. He appeared in 15 games as a backup offensive lineman in 2018 as North Dakota State won another national championship. He moved into a starting role in the 2019 season, starting all 16 games at left guard while helping the team win another national championship and set a school record with 4,601 rushing yards; HERO Sports named him a sophomore All-America selection. The following year, Jensen started 10 games at left guard.

In 2021, Jensen won his fourth national championship with the Bison while starting all 15 games, helping them have the second-best rushing offense in the FCS. He opted to return for the 2022 season after all NCAA athletes were given an extra year of eligibility due to the COVID-19 pandemic. He was named a first-team all-conference choice and a first-team FCS All-American after the season, in which he set what is thought to be the NCAA's all-time record for games played with 70.

== Professional career ==
Pre-draft measurables
Height	Weight	Arm length	Hand span	Wingspan	40-yard dash	10-yard split	20-yard split	20-yard shuttle	Three-cone drill	Vertical jump	Broad jump	Bench press
6 ft 3 7/8 in (1.93 m)	322 lb (146 kg)	33 1/8 in (0.84 m)	9 1/4 in (0.23 m)	6 ft 6 5/8 in (2.00 m)	5.31 s	1.85 s	3.01 s	4.68 s	8.01 s	27.0 in (0.69 m)	8 ft 4 in (2.54 m)	33 reps
All values from Pro Day

=== Carolina Panthers ===
Jensen was selected in the sixth round (41st overall) of the 2023 USFL draft by the Pittsburgh Maulers. He was not chosen in the 2023 NFL draft, but afterwards signed with the Carolina Panthers as an undrafted free agent. On August 29, 2023, the Panthers announced that Jensen had made the initial 53-man roster.

On August 15, 2024, Jensen was waived/injured by the Panthers.

=== Memphis Showboats ===
On January 6, 2025, Jensen signed with the Memphis Showboats of the United Football League (UFL).

=== Louisville Kings ===
On January 13, 2026, Jensen was selected by the Louisville Kings in the 2026 UFL Draft. He was released on April 19.
