= South St. Paul, Minnesota =

City in Minnesota, United States

South St. Paul
- City
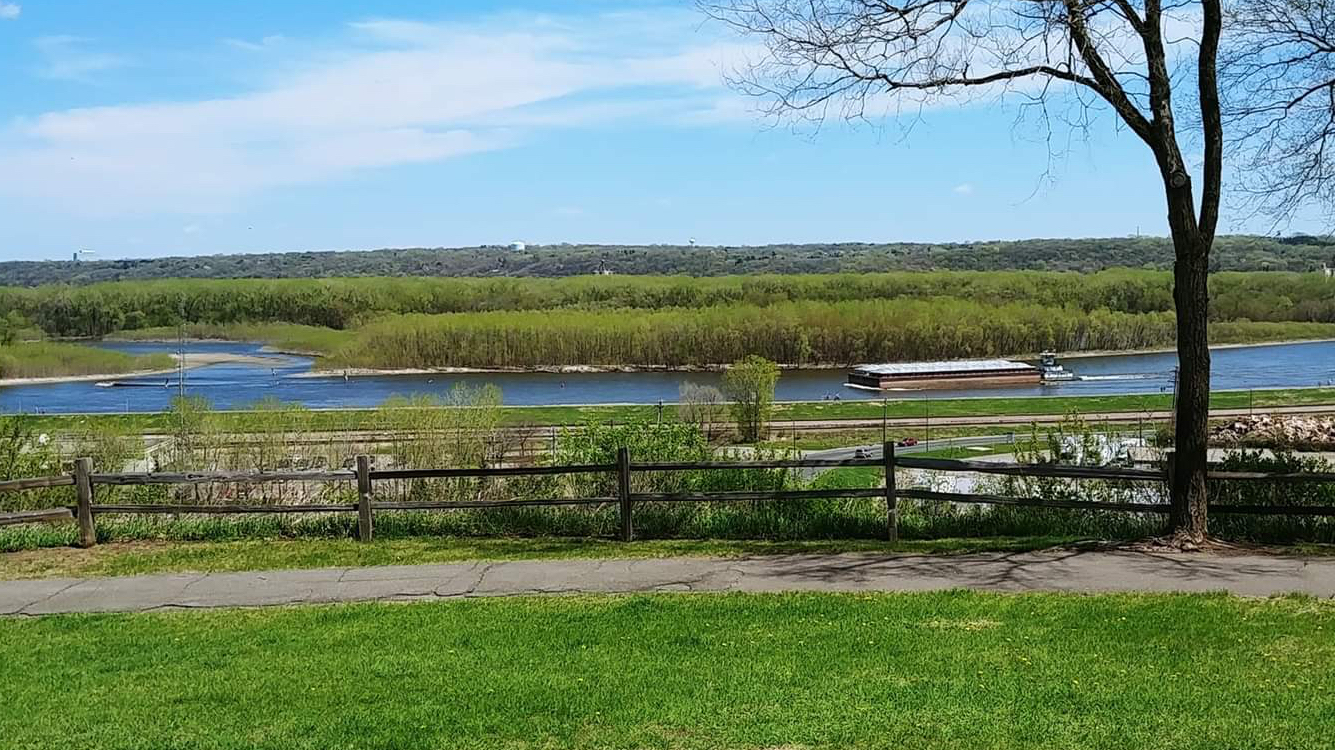
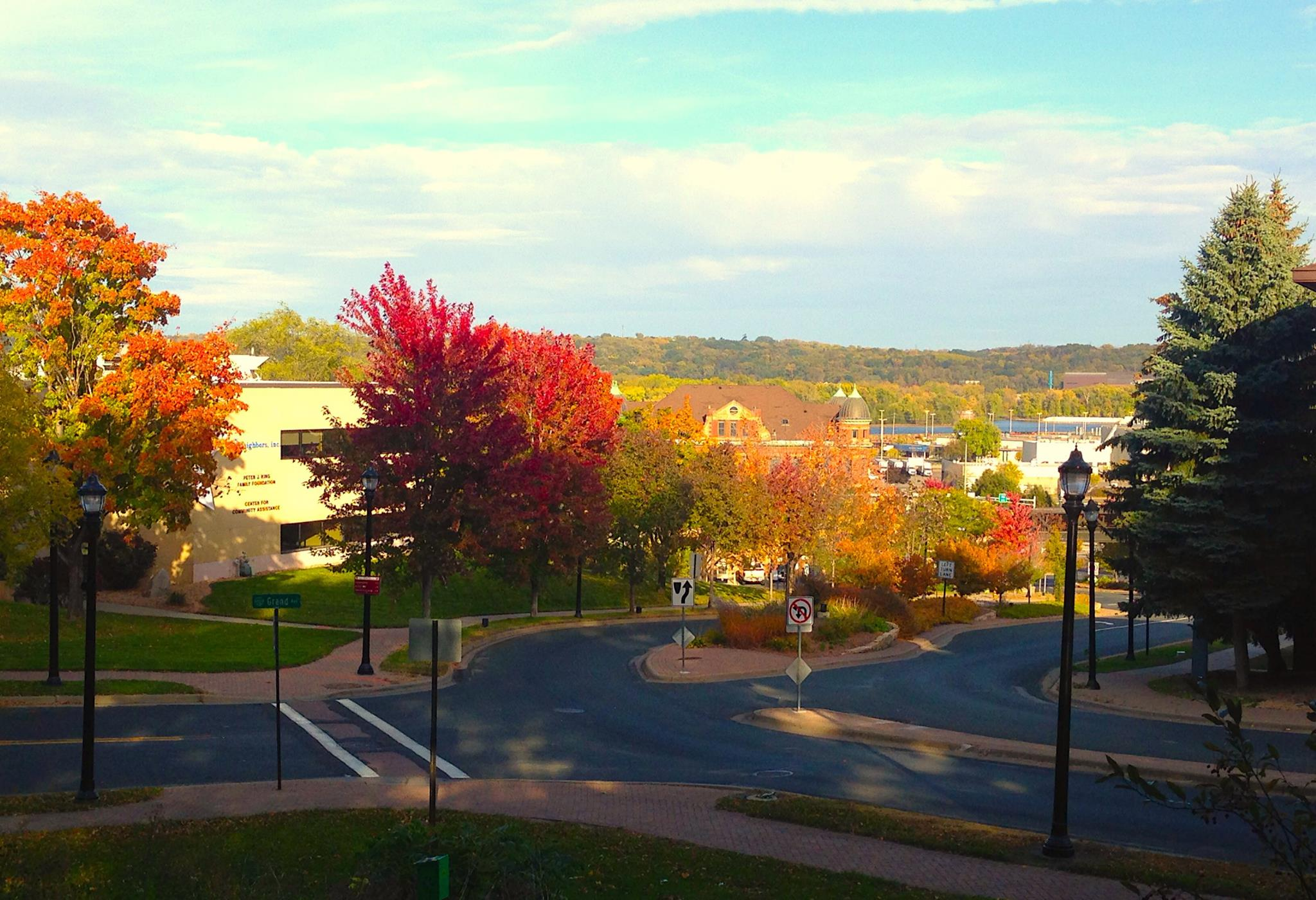
- Grandview Park overlooking the Mississippi River Looking down Grand Avenue in South St. Paul towards the Mississippi River
- Nickname: S.S.P.
- Location of the city of South St. Paul within Dakota County, Minnesota
- Coordinates: 44°53′17″N 93°2′44″W
- Country: United States
- State: Minnesota
- County: Dakota
- Incorporated: March 2, 1887

Government
  - Type: Mayor (Municipal)
  - Mayor: Jimmy Francis
  - Council: Matthew Thompson; Lori Hansen; Pam Bakken; Todd Podgorski; Joe Kaliszewski; Tom Seaberg

Area
  - Total: 6.07 sq mi (15.73 km^{2})
  - Land: 5.63 sq mi (14.57 km^{2})
  - Water: 0.45 sq mi (1.16 km^{2})
- Elevation: 719 ft (219 m)

Population (2020)
  - Total: 20,759
  - Estimate (2022): 20,506
  - Density: 3,690.7/sq mi (1,424.98/km^{2})
- Time zone: UTC−6 (Central (CST))
  - Summer (DST): UTC−5 (CDT)
- ZIP Codes: 55075, 55076
- Area code: 651
- FIPS code: 27-61492
- GNIS feature ID: 0652339
- Website: www.southstpaulmn.gov

South St. Paul is a city in Dakota County, Minnesota, United States, immediately south and southeast of St. Paul and east of West St. Paul. The population was 20,759 at the 2020 census. The town was a major meat-packing location, and many residents are descended from immigrants of Southern European and Eastern European heritage, who came to work in the meat-packing plants in the early twentieth century.

A post office called "South St. Paul" has been in operation since 1888. The city was named based on its location, south of St. Paul.

== Geography ==
According to the United States Census Bureau, the city has an area of 6.073 square miles (15.73 km^{2}), of which 5.625 square miles (14.57 km^{2}) is land, and 0.448 square miles (1.16 km^{2}) is water.

Interstate Highway 494, U.S. Highway 52, and Dakota County Road 56 are three of the major routes that traverse South St. Paul. It is home to a small general aviation airport, Fleming Field.

The main industry historically was the Saint Paul Union Stockyards. The two largest companies and employers in the town during the time of peak stockyard operations were Swift's & Company and Armour Meats.

Since 2008, the stockyards have been closed, and much of the area is now being redeveloped.

== Demographics ==
Historical population
Census	Pop.	Note	%±
1860	907		—
1870	1,103		21.6%
1880	489		−55.7%
1890	2,242		358.5%
1900	2,322		3.6%
1910	4,510		94.2%
1920	6,860		52.1%
1930	10,009		45.9%
1940	11,844		18.3%
1950	15,909		34.3%
1960	22,032		38.5%
1970	25,016		13.5%
1980	21,235		−15.1%
1990	20,197		−4.9%
2000	20,167		−0.1%
2010	20,160		0.0%
2020	20,759		3.0%
2022 (est.)	20,506		−1.2%
U.S. Decennial Census; 2020 Census

An office building in South St. Paul

=== 2020 census ===
As of the 2020 census, South St. Paul had a population of 20,759. The median age was 36.8 years. 23.5% of residents were under the age of 18 and 13.6% were 65 years of age or older. The population was 50.9% female. For every 100 females there were 96.3 males, and for every 100 females age 18 and over there were 94.0 males age 18 and over.

100.0% of residents lived in urban areas, while 0.0% lived in rural areas.

There were 8,432 households in South St. Paul, of which 30.6% had children under the age of 18 living in them. Of all households, 40.7% were married-couple households, 20.8% were households with a male householder and no spouse or partner present, and 29.2% were households with a female householder and no spouse or partner present. About 31.4% of all households were made up of individuals and 11.7% had someone living alone who was 65 years of age or older.

There were 8,756 housing units, of which 3.7% were vacant. The homeowner vacancy rate was 0.9% and the rental vacancy rate was 3.8%.

Racial composition as of the 2020 census
Race	Number	Percent
White	15,043	72.5%
Black or African American	1,355	6.5%
American Indian and Alaska Native	224	1.1%
Asian	582	2.8%
Native Hawaiian and Other Pacific Islander	14	0.1%
Some other race	1,464	7.1%
Two or more races	2,077	10.0%
Hispanic or Latino (of any race)	3,219	15.5%

=== 2010 census ===
As of the census of 2010, there were 20,160 people, 8,186 households, and 5,065 families residing in the city. The population density was 3,568.1 inhabitants per square mile (1,377.7/km^{2}). There were 8,666 housing units, at an average density of 1,533.8 per square mile (592.2/km^{2}). The racial makeup of the city was 85.3% White, 3.9% African American, 0.8% Native American, 1.2% Asian, 0.1% Pacific Islander, 5.4% from other races, and 3.4% from two or more races. Hispanic or Latino people of any race were 12.2% of the population.

There were 8,186 households, of which 31.4% had children under the age of 18 living with them, 42.2% were married couples living together, 14.2% had a female householder with no husband present, 5.4% had a male householder with no wife present, and 38.1% were non-families. 30.1% of all households were made up of individuals, and 10.1% had someone living alone who was 65 years of age or older. The average household size was 2.44 and the average family size was 3.04.

The median age in the city was 36.9 years. 23.8% of residents were under the age of 18; 8.4% were between the ages of 18 and 24; 28.8% were from 25 to 44; 27% were from 45 to 64; and 12% were 65 years of age or older. The gender makeup of the city was 49.2% male and 50.8% female.

=== 2000 census ===
As of the census of 2000, there were 20,167 people, 8,123 households, and 5,255 families residing in the city. The population density was 3,515.9 inhabitants per square mile (1,357.5/km^{2}). There were 8,313 housing units at an average density of 1,449.3 per square mile (559.6/km^{2}). The racial makeup of the city was 92.63% White, 1.28% African American, 0.57% Native American, 0.82% Asian, 0.01% Pacific Islander, 2.80% from other races, and 1.90% from two or more races. Hispanic or Latino people of any race were 6.42% of the population.

There were 8,123 households, out of which 32.5% had children under the age of 18 living with them, 47.0% were married couples living together, 13.1% had a female householder with no husband present, and 35.3% were non-families. 28.8% of all households were made up of individuals, and 10.8% had someone living alone who was 65 years of age or older. The average household size was 2.47 and the average family size was 3.05.

In the city, the population was spread out, with 25.4% under the age of 18, 9.0% from 18 to 24, 32.7% from 25 to 44, 20.1% from 45 to 64, and 12.8% who were 65 years of age or older. The median age was 35 years. For every 100 females, there were 95.3 males. For every 100 females age 18 and over, there were 93.1 males.

The median income for a household in the city was $45,216, and the median income for a family was $54,119. Males had a median income of $36,466 versus $28,415 for females. The per capita income for the city was $21,396. About 4.1% of families, and 6.1% of the population were below the poverty line, including 6.8% of those under age 18 and 5.7% of those age 65 or over.

== Education ==
All area zoned for residential purposes is within the South St. Paul Public School District. There district's comprehensive middle and high school is South St. Paul Secondary, which is home to the South St. Paul Packers.

Some land zoned for industrial purposes is in the Inver Grove Heights Schools.

== Notable people ==
- Jim Carter, football player
- Mike Farrell, actor
- Justin Faulk, hockey player
- Trevor Fehrman, actor and writer
- Rollin Glewwe, Minnesota state senator and politician
- Grant Hart, musician
- Phil Housley, hockey player
- Sunisa Lee, Olympic gold medalist and gymnast
- Harold LeVander, Governor of Minnesota
- Betty McCollum, U.S. Congress
- Tim Pawlenty, Governor of Minnesota
- James Patrick Shannon, former Roman Catholic Bishop from the Archdiocese of Saint Paul and Minneapolis, only Bishop to leave the priesthood after Vatican II
- Alex Stalock, Unrestricted Free Agent goaltender in the National Hockey League
- Kathy Tingelstad, Minnesota State Representative
- Conrado Vega, Minnesota state senator
- Doug Woog, hockey player
- Marguerite Cole, first woman to vote in the United States
