= Kathy Tingelstad =

American politician (born 1958)

Member of the Minnesota House of Representatives from the 49B and 50B district
- In office January 7, 1997 – January 5, 2009
- Preceded by: Teresa Lynch
- Succeeded by: Jerry Newton

Personal details
- Born: March 21, 1958 (age 68) Saint Paul, Minnesota
- Party: Republican Party of Minnesota
- Spouse: Merle
- Children: Karl and Erik
- Education: University of Minnesota (BA); University of St. Thomas (MBA)
- Profession: Business consultant, legislator, lobbyist

Kathy Tingelstad (born March 21, 1958) is a Minnesota politician and a former member of the Minnesota House of Representatives who represented District 49B, which primarily includes portions of the cities of Andover and Coon Rapids in Anoka County in the northern Twin Cities metropolitan area. Prior to the 2002 legislative redistricting, the area was known as District 50B. A Republican, she is also a business consultant.

Tingelstad was first elected in 1996, succeeding four-term Rep. Teresa Lynch, who did not seek re-election. She was re-elected every two years until 2006, and did not run in 2008. While in the House, she served as chair of the Governmental Operations and Veterans Affairs Committee during the 2005–2006 biennium, and was a member of the Capital Investment, Environment and Natural Resources, Health and Human Services, Redistricting, and Rules and Legislative Administration committees, and of various committee incorporations and subcommittees relevant to each.

Tingelstad graduated from South Saint Paul High School in South Saint Paul, then went on to the University of Minnesota in Minneapolis, earning her B.A. in Communications. She later earned a M.B.A. certificate in Organization Management from the University of St. Thomas in Saint Paul. She was an intern in Minnesota Congressman Al Quie's office in the 1970s.

Tingelstad served as a member of the board of the Anoka-Hennepin School District. She was appointed to the position in January 2009, filling the seat vacated by her successor in the legislature, Rep. Jerry Newton. She was elected to a full term on the board in the November 2009 general election. She resigned from the board in March 2012 after casting the only vote against a settlement with the US Justice Department over the district's handling of issues involving bullying and sexual orientation. Students had said the district did not adequately respond to their complaints of persistent physical and verbal harassment based on real or perceived sexual orientation.

Tingelstad was employed by Anoka County as the Chief Lobbyist, until October 2014 and is currently retired however volunteers in several organizations, the most notable of which is her position as President of the Federation of Republican Women.
