= Marguerite Cole =

First woman to vote in the United States (1897–1987)

- Born: Marguerite Anne Newburgh; November 28, 1897; Orange City, Iowa, United States
- Died: December 22, 1987 (aged 90); Whittier, California, United States
- Notable work: Became the first woman to vote in the United States under the Nineteenth Amendment to the United States Constitution

Marguerite Anne Newburgh Cole (November 28, 1897 – December 22, 1987) was an American who became the first woman to vote in the United States. She and other women were officially granted the right to vote after certification of the Nineteenth Amendment to the United States Constitution, which had been passed by the U.S. Congress in 1919 and then ratified by thirty-six U.S. states as of August 2020.

== Formative years ==
Born as Marguerite Anne Newburgh in Orange City, Iowa on November 28, 1897, Marguerite Cole was a daughter of Louis Henry Newburgh, a contractor from Minnesota, and Louisa Van Den Berg.

She was one of five children, along with Nellie, Leona, Ruth, and Eugene. Her paternal grandmother was from Ireland and her paternal grandfather was from the Netherlands.

== Making voting history ==
Voting in South Saint Paul, Minnesota as Marguerite Newburgh on August 27, 1920, Newburgh became the first woman to vote in the United States after women were granted the right to vote by the August 26, 1920 certification of the recently ratified Nineteenth Amendment to the United States Constitution, which had been passed in 1919. The first person in the line of voters at Saint Paul's city hall that day, she participated in a special election related to a proposed $85,000 water bond to fund the creation of a new, second water well for her community.

Describing herself as a progressive Republican, Newburgh was employed at the time as a stenographer for the city engineer's office in South St. Paul. She voted in favor of the bond measure, stating:

"I believe in public ownership of necessary public utilities.... I got up at 5:15 a.m. today and hurried down to the polling place of the First precinct, in the city hall. I had to wait until the booth opened at 6 o'clock. And I marked my ballot for the water works bond issue so that our city can have a fine public owned water works system."

== Marriage and family ==
Marguerite Newburgh married Lyle William Cole in 1923. They had one child, Joanne, who was born in Iowa in 1929. Sometime before 1930, she relocated with her husband and daughter to the western United States, and settled in Santa Ana, California. By 1940, they were residents of Los Angeles, California.

== Career and community service ==
Cole held several administrative jobs during her lifetime. During her father's tenure as a councilman in Saint Paul, she worked as his assistant.

Employed as a stenographer during the 1920s, she also worked as a movie theater office manager, as a central market cashier during the 1940s and as an apartment complex manager during the 1950s.

After relocating to the West Coast, she volunteered for the Spastic Children's League in Los Angeles, California and the East Whittier YMCA in Whittier.

== Death ==
Preceded in death by her husband, Lyle Cole, in 1972, Marguerite Cole died in Whittier, Los Angeles County on December 22, 1987. She was interred in that community's Rose Hills Memorial Park. Her daughter, Joanne, died in 2004.
