= Bryce Hawthorne =

American football player (born 2005)

No. 96 – Iowa Hawkeyes
- Position: Defensive tackle
- Class: Senior

Personal information
- Born: June 1, 2005 (age 21)
- Listed height: 6 ft 3 in (1.91 m)
- Listed weight: 298 lb (135 kg)

Career information
- High school: Osseo (Osseo, Minnesota)
- College: South Dakota State (2023–2024); Iowa (2025–present)
- Stats at ESPN

Bryce Hawthorne (born June 1, 2005) is an American college football defensive tackle for the Iowa Hawkeyes. He previously played for the South Dakota State Jackrabbits.

== Early life ==
Hawthorne attended Osseo Senior High School in Osseo, Minnesota. He committed to the South Dakota State University to play college football.

== College career ==
Hawthorne played at South Dakota State in 2023 and 2024. He played in three games and redshirted his freshman year in 2023 and played in all 14 games in 2024, recording 22 tackles and 4.5 sacks. After the 2024 season, Hawthorne entered the transfer portal and committed to the University of Iowa. In his first year at Iowa in 2025, he played in all 13 games and had 15 tackles. He returned to Iowa as a starter in 2026.
