= Elk River Water Tower =

Water tower in Minnesota, United States

- U.S. National Register of Historic Places
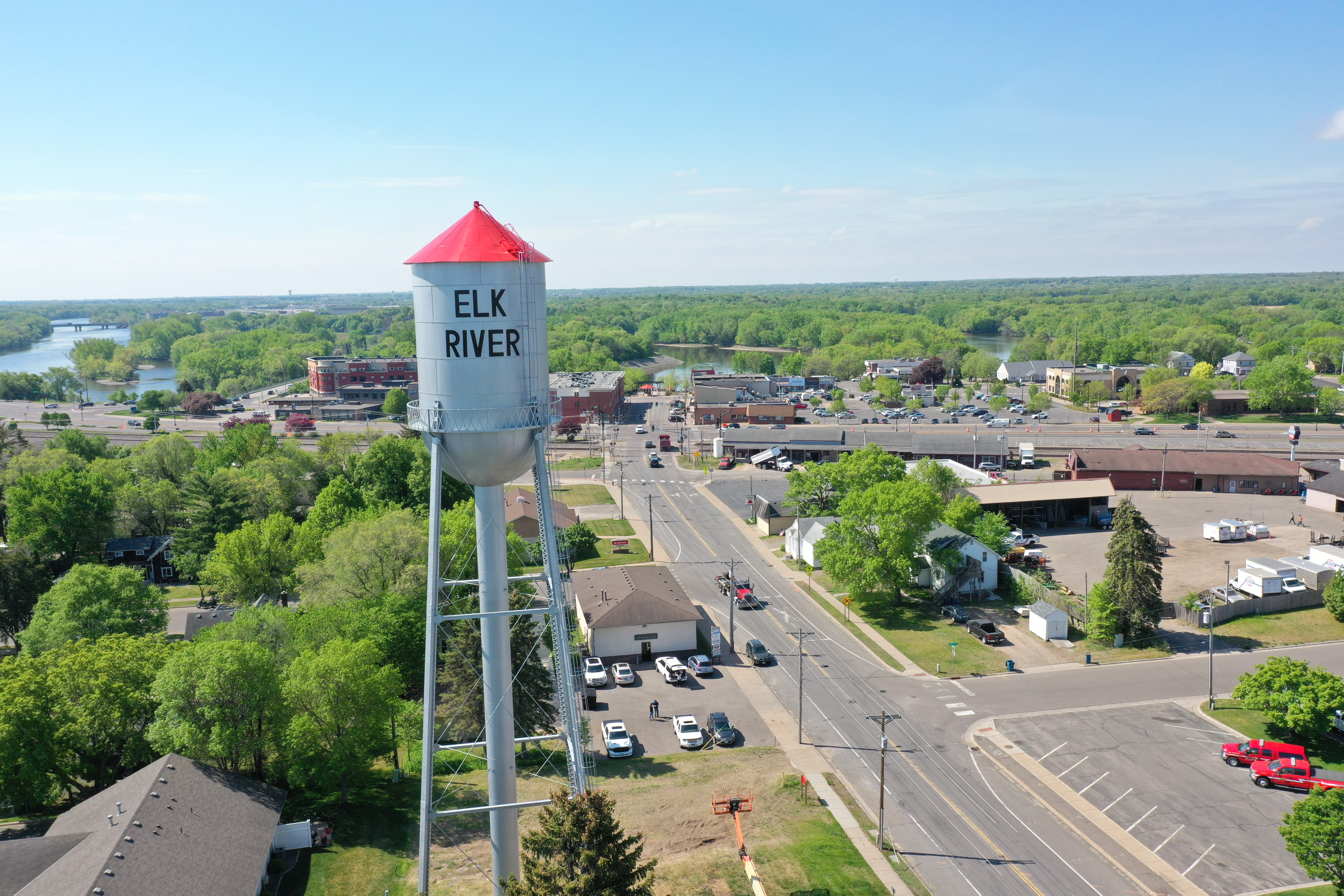
- The Elk River Water Tower from the north

- Location within Minnesota Location within the United States
- Location: Jackson Avenue and 4th Street NW, Elk River, Minnesota
- Coordinates: 45°18′21.8″N 93°33′59.7″W
- Built: 1920
- Built by: Minneapolis Steel & Machinery Company
- NRHP reference No.: 12000284
- Added to NRHP: May 23, 2012

The Elk River Water Tower is a historic water tower in Elk River, Minnesota, United States. It was built in 1920 to improve the city's firefighting infrastructure, and uses a design popular from 1890 to 1940. It was listed on the National Register of Historic Places in 2012 for its significance in the themes of "community planning and development" and "engineering". It was nominated for its impact on community development and as a representative of a once-common but vanishing design.

In 2021, Elk River was able to restore the water tower using Minnesota Historical and Cultural Heritage Grants. The tower was returned to its original color scheme of silver with a red top, with black block lettering of the city's name.

== See also ==
- National Register of Historic Places listings in Sherburne County, Minnesota
