= Osseo Senior High School =

Public school in Minnesota, United States

Location
- 317 2nd Avenue NW; Osseo, Minnesota 55369; United States; 45°07′13″N 93°24′23″W

Information
- Type: Public
- Established: 1924
- School district: Osseo Area School District 279
- Principal: Kimberly Berling
- Teaching staff: 115.26 (FTE)
- Enrollment: 2,249 (2023-2024)
- Student to teacher ratio: 19.51
- Color
- Athletics conference: Northwest Suburban Conference
- Nickname: Orioles
- Website: osh.district279.org

Osseo Senior High School is a four-year public high school located in Osseo, Minnesota, United States on 317 2nd Ave. NW. Osseo Senior High School is a part of the Osseo Area School District 279 and is one of three four-year high schools in the district. The school includes grades 9-12 and has done so since September 2015. Previously, grade 9 students attended junior high school. The majority of Osseo students are from Osseo, Brooklyn Park, Maple Grove and Plymouth.

== History ==
Osseo Senior High opened its doors in 1924 as the first high school built by the Osseo School District.

== Demographics ==
According to the Minnesota Department of Education, the racial makeup of Osseo during the 2024-25 school year was as follows:

Race/Ethnicity	Enrollment
African-American	36.8%
White	25.7%
Asian	16.1%
Hispanic	12.8%
Two or More Races	6.4%
Native American	2.0%
Pacific Islander	<0.1%
Other	<0.1%

== Notable alumni ==
- Calvin Bloom, professional wrestler signed to the WWE as Von Wagner
- Jennifer Carnahan, former chairwoman of the Republican Party of Minnesota from 2017-2021 and current mayor of Nisswa, Minnesota
- Mike Enos, professional wrestler
- Bryce Hawthorne, college football defensive tackle for the Iowa Hawkeyes
- Joe Jensen, professional hockey player who played for the Carolina Hurricanes of the NHL
- Nash Jensen, professional football player
- Trent Klatt, former NHL player who played for the Philadelphia Flyers, Minnesota North Stars, Dallas Stars, Vancouver Canucks and Los Angeles Kings
- Kevin Kling, commentator for National Public Radio and acclaimed storyteller and playwright
- James Martinez - Olympic greco-roman wrestling Bronze-medalist, lightweight
- Erin Koegel, state representative
- Travis Morin, former NHL/AHL, professional hockey player for the Dallas Stars; drafted by the Washington Capitols and played for their minor league teams the South Carolina Stingrays and the Hershey Bears
- Jerry Newton, state representative
- Caleb Truax, professional Boxer, IBF Super Middleweight Champion
- Claudia Meier Volk, American politician who served in the Minnesota House of Representatives
- Jake Wheatley, Pennsylvania state representative
