= Osseo, Minnesota =

Town in Minnesota, United States

- City
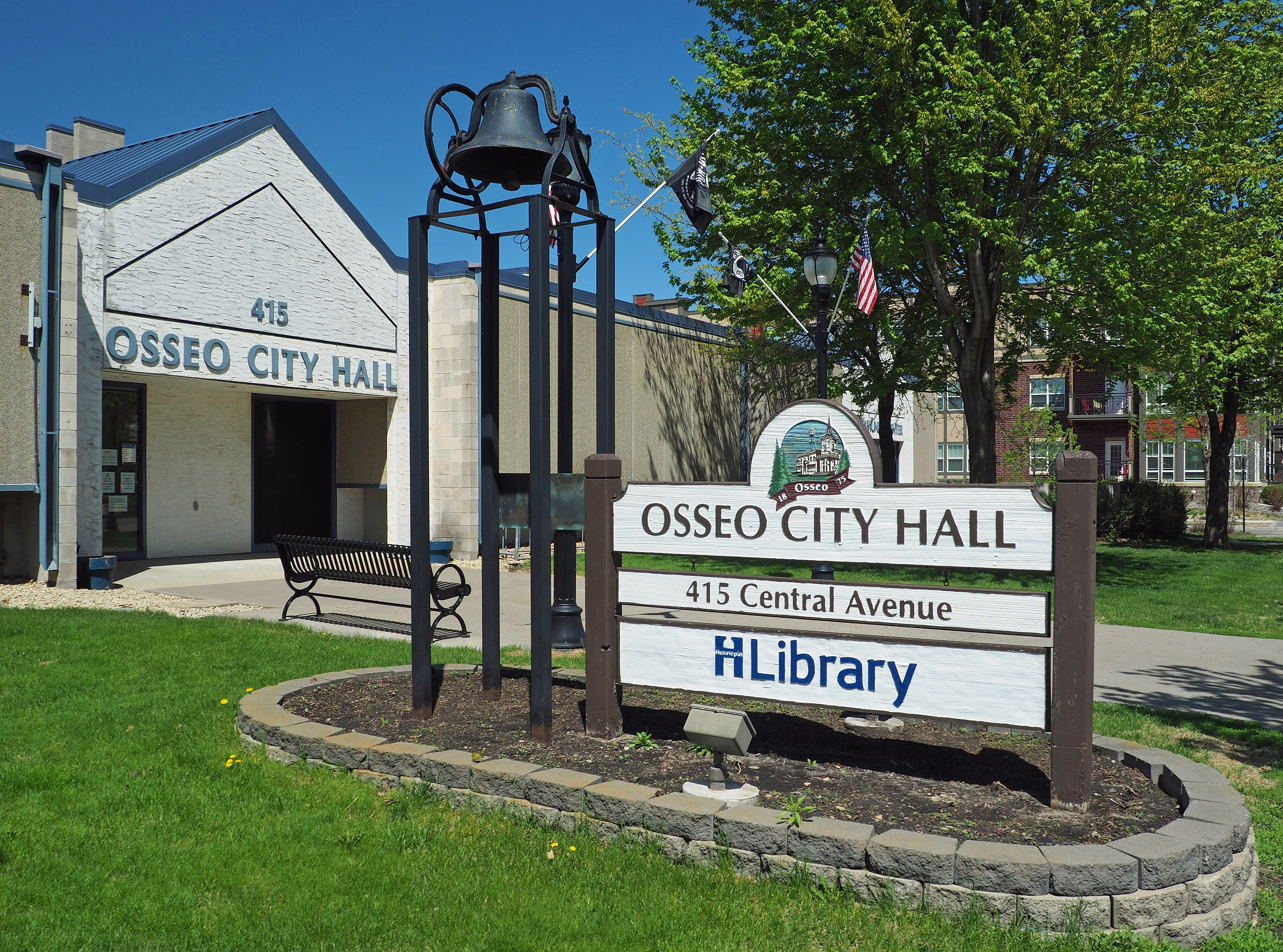
- Osseo City Hall and Library

- Logo

- Location of the city of Osseo within Hennepin County, Minnesota
- Coordinates: 45°7′2″N 93°23′58″W
- Country: United States
- State: Minnesota
- County: Hennepin
- Founded: 1875

Government
  - Mayor: Duane Poppe

Area
  - Total: 0.74 sq mi (1.92 km^{2})
  - Land: 0.74 sq mi (1.92 km^{2})
  - Water: 0 sq mi (0.00 km^{2})
- Elevation: 890 ft (270 m)

Population (2020)
  - Total: 2,688
  - Density: 3,621.0/sq mi (1,398.08/km^{2})
- Time zone: UTC−6 (Central)
  - Summer (DST): UTC−5 (Central)
- ZIP Codes: 55311, 55369
- Area code: 763
- FIPS code: 27-49012
- GNIS feature ID: 0649024
- Website: www.osseomn.gov

Osseo (/ˈɒsi.oʊ/ OSS-ee-oh) is a small city in Hennepin County, Minnesota, United States. As of the 2020 United States census, it has a population of 2,688.

== Etymology ==
It is said that "Osseo" derives from the Ojibwe name "Waaseyaa" meaning "There is light", more commonly translated as "Son of the Evening Star". Henry Wadsworth Longfellow uses the word "Osseo" in his poem The Song of Hiawatha.

== Geography ==
Osseo is in northeastern Hennepin County, bordered by Brooklyn Park to the east and Maple Grove to the west. It has an area of 0.69 square miles (1.8 km^{2}), all land.

There are three main transportation routes in the city. Jefferson Highway runs straight north/south through the city; the business stretch is Central Avenue. U.S. Highway 169 follows the eastern boundary. Bottineau Boulevard (County Road 81) runs northwest through the city.

== History ==
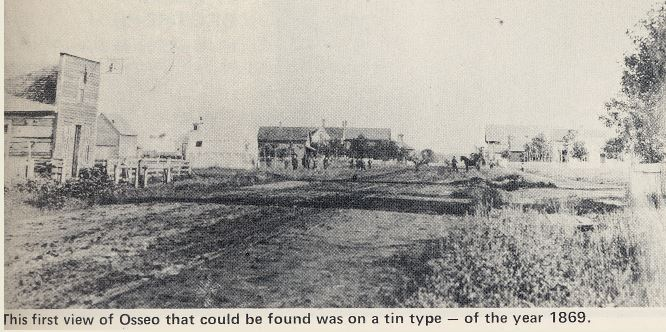
Osseo in 1869

The area that is now Osseo was settled before organized local government. It was on what Pierre Bottineau named Bottineau Prairie in 1852; the community was called Palestine. In 1856 part of the town was platted as Osseo and another part as "City of Attraction". Official Minnesota Territory surveys placed the settlement on the border of two townships. When Brooklyn Township and Maple Grove Township organized, Osseo (and City of Attraction, which later merged) was governed by those two governments. Osseo incorporated on March 17, 1875.

The ethnic groups that moved in after Native tribes were removed were mostly French Canadians, New Englanders, Swiss and Germans. The pioneers' businesses included blacksmiths, wagonmakers, general merchandise stores, boots & shoemakers, harness makers, tin shops, cordwood suppliers, teamsters, saloons, and hotels (Niggler Hotel, 1867; International Hotel, 1874; Great Northern Hotel, 1907). There was also a Catholic church (1858), a physician, school, post office, and calaboose (jail). Methodists and Lutherans were served in their homes until the 20th century.

In 1882 the Great Northern Railroad "came steaming through town", and in 1893 a telephone station appeared. A town hall was built in 1901. The city water system and fire department began in 1915. The original Indian trail—extending from St. Paul to St. Cloud—was the town's main street, and was paved in 1918 (Territorial Road). Osseo Lutheran Church was built around 1915; the Methodist Church was built in 1922. The first Osseo High School was built in 1924. 1928 was the peak when "Osseo had one of the largest potato markets in the Northwest."

A newspaper article written upon the death of John Hechtman, "The Father of Osseo", informs the reader of Osseo's opportunities and social organizations of his time.

Opposite today's City Hall are memorials to US military veterans from Osseo. In 1937 a large granite monument was erected in memory of Civil War soldiers. On Memorial Day 1946 another Honor Roll was constructed of granite with a bronze plate engraved with names of those who served during the Spanish–American War, World War I and World War II. In 1957 the memorial area was named Father Boerboom Park, after a pastor of St. Vincent Rectory and the principal of its parochial school who had served since 1917.

The Osseo Water Tower, built in 1915, was listed on the National Register of Historic Places in 2017.

== Government ==
Osseo incorporated in 1875 as a village and became a statutory city in 1972. The city council comprises a mayor (two-year term) and four councilors (four-year terms). City departments are Economic Development, Planning, Administration, Community Development, Fire, Parks/Recreation, Police, and Public Works. The Osseo Library is in City Hall and is a branch of the Hennepin County Library System. Osseo publishes a quarterly newsletter, Osseo Outlook, and co-publishes an annual resident guide with Maple Grove; both are online. City facilities include a community center. The city is a member of I-94 Area Chamber of Commerce.

== Education ==
Schools within the city limits are Osseo Middle School and Osseo Senior High School. Osseo and surrounding communities are served free public education from primary level to secondary level by the Osseo Area School District 279. The school district also provides free public education for Brooklyn Center, Brooklyn Park, Maple Grove, Plymouth, Corcoran, Dayton and Hassan. The district's mission is "to inspire and prepare all students with the confidence, courage and competence to achieve their dreams; contribute to community; and engage in a lifetime of learning."

== Demographics ==
Historical population
Census	Pop.	Note	%±
1880	206		—
1890	353		71.4%
1900	346		−2.0%
1910	390		12.7%
1920	433		11.0%
1930	561		29.6%
1940	738		31.6%
1950	1,167		58.1%
1960	2,104		80.3%
1970	2,908		38.2%
1980	2,974		2.3%
1990	2,704		−9.1%
2000	2,434		−10.0%
2010	2,430		−0.2%
2020	2,688		10.6%
U.S. Decennial Census

=== 2020 census ===
As of the 2020 census, Osseo had a population of 2,688. The median age was 43.0 years. 16.4% of residents were under the age of 18 and 23.5% of residents were 65 years of age or older. For every 100 females there were 90.9 males, and for every 100 females age 18 and over there were 89.2 males age 18 and over.

100.0% of residents lived in urban areas, while 0.0% lived in rural areas.

There were 1,285 households in Osseo, of which 21.9% had children under the age of 18 living in them. Of all households, 34.7% were married-couple households, 21.9% were households with a male householder and no spouse or partner present, and 34.7% were households with a female householder and no spouse or partner present. About 40.6% of all households were made up of individuals and 18.4% had someone living alone who was 65 years of age or older.

There were 1,348 housing units, of which 4.7% were vacant. The homeowner vacancy rate was 0.6% and the rental vacancy rate was 6.1%.

Racial composition as of the 2020 census
Race	Number	Percent
White	2,167	80.6%
Black or African American	176	6.5%
American Indian and Alaska Native	7	0.3%
Asian	54	2.0%
Native Hawaiian and Other Pacific Islander	0	0.0%
Some other race	43	1.6%
Two or more races	241	9.0%
Hispanic or Latino (of any race)	134	5.0%

=== Demographic estimates ===
29.2% are of German ancestry. 7.2% have graduate or professional degrees. The poverty rate is 3.9%.

== Annual events ==
Osseo has multiple social clubs and ongoing activities:

Osseo Orchard

In 2017, volunteers planted over 30 trees and fruiting shrubs at the Osseo Public Works site at the intersection of 2nd Street SE and 8th Ave SE. The orchard includes apples, pears, plums, and cherries. Berries include blueberries, currants, and jostaberries. Residents are welcome to visit the orchard and take advantage of ripe produce.

Concerts and Movies in the Park

An effort led by Osseo's citizens enabled the construction of a bandshell in the northeast corner of Boerboom Veterans Park downtown. The bandshell is a popular place in the summer when musicians perform on Tuesday evenings, followed at dusk by a movie. This activity is supported by local donations and almost all events are free to the public.

Osseo Marching Band Festival

The Osseo Marching Band Festival is a street marching competition between high school bands along a route through the city. Popular in northern midwestern states including Minnesota and Wisconsin, street marching band competitions are held in May, June and July. The Osseo Marching Band Festival is held each year on Saturday of the last full weekend in June. A free award ceremony is held afterward in the High School Stadium. This activity is organized by the Osseo Band Boosters and funded by local donations, corporate sponsorship and fund-raising activities.

Lions Roar

The Osseo Lions Roar, hosted by the Osseo Lions Club, is held on the Friday and Saturday after Labor Day. It includes a street fair with crafts, a carnival in the parking lots near Central Avenue and 3rd Street, and a parade at noon on Saturday beginning at Sipe's Park and ending at the Osseo Senior High School. The parade features local organizations such as sports teams from the high school, girl scout and boy scout troops, and the Osseo Marching Band.

Osseo Lions Kiddie Costume Parade

Osseo Lions Kiddie Costume Parade is held on Saturday at the end of October at noon. The parade starts at North Clinic on Central Avenue and ends at Boerboom Park.

Minnidazzle

Each first Friday in December, the community celebrates the upcoming holidays with the Fire Truck Parade, hot beverages and bonfire, and a chance for children to meet Santa and get a free goodie bag. It is free and open to the public.

== Notable people ==
- Brian Merritt Bergson, Minnesota state legislator; House 1993-94 (District 48A). Resident of Osseo when elected.
- Pierre Bottineau,(1817-1895) accomplished surveyor, famed guide, fur trader, pioneer; "Kit Carson of the Northwest,". Established catholic church in Osseo.
- Andy Hedlund, professional ice hockey defenseman; born in Osseo, 1978.
- Kevin Kling, award-winning storyteller and author; grew up in Osseo.
- James Martinez, champion wrestler
- Caleb Truax, professional middleweight boxer
- Nash Jensen, professional football player; OHS graduate.
