= Rochat-Louise-Sauerwein Block =

- U.S. National Register of Historic Places
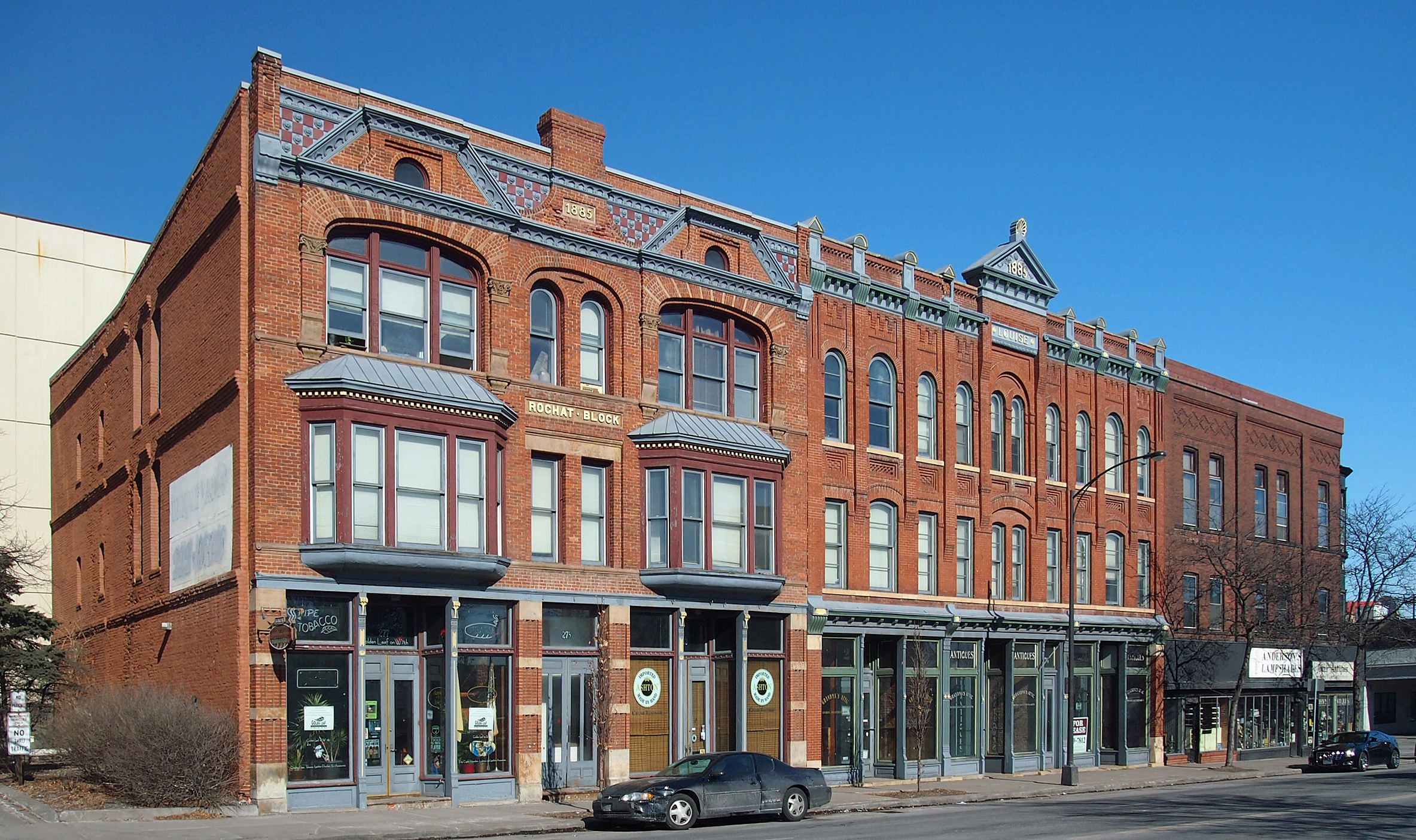
- The Rochat-Louise-Sauerwein Block from south

- Location within Minnesota Location within the United States
- Location: 261-277 7th Street West; Saint Paul, Minnesota
- Coordinates: 44°56′33″N 93°6′20″W
- Built: 1884
- Architect: William H. Castner; Edward P. Bassford
- Architectural style: Late Victorian
- NRHP reference No.: 80002126
- Added to NRHP: November 19, 1980

The Rochat-Louise-Sauerwein Block are a group of buildings that comprise one of the few remaining intact Victorian commercial blocks in Saint Paul, Minnesota, United States. They were built 1885-1895 by Castner, Hermann Kretz, and Edward P. Bassford, and are listed on the National Register of Historic Places.

== Descriptions ==
The three buildings of the Rochat-Louise-Sauerwein block exemplify the Victorian-era practice of small businessmen construcing buildings for themselves for combined commercial and residential use. West Seventh was once lined with similar structures. The block arose at the same time as other notable buildings such as the Schornstein Grocery and Saloon, Walsh Building, Manhatten Building, Merchants National Bank, and Pioneer and Endicott buildings in the area due to an economic boom in St. Paul. In 2017, all three buildings were left vacant at the storefront level.

=== Rochat building ===
The Rochat building is the westernmost building on the block. It was built and named for George Rochat, a Swiss-born watchmaker, and was designed by William H. Castner in 1884. The building is listed as an "excellent example of commercial Victorian architecture". There are oriel windows on the second floor and elliptical arched windows on the third. The front facade includes a heavily-detailed simulated mansard roof.

=== Louise building ===
The central building on the block was built in 1885 by local architect Edward P. Bassford. The building is divided into nine bays by brick pilaster strips. The windows have semicircular arches. The building is topped with a parapet and an iron bracketed cornice. There is a full pediment from the center of the facade with the date and the name "Louise".

=== Sauerwein building ===
The Sauerwein building is the eastmost building on the block and was constructed in 1895 for John Sauerwein and designed by Herman Kretz. The Sauerwein building features diamond brick work, has decorateive metal swags, and is divided into bays by brick pilaster strips. The building has been altered more heavily than the other two on the block.
