= Tom McKee (Minnesota politician) =

American politician

Member-elect of the Minnesota House of Representatives from the 37A district
- Assuming office January 2027
- Succeeding: Kristin Robbins

Personal details
- Party: Republican

Tom McKee is an American politician. A Republican, he is the mayor of Corcoran, Minnesota, as well as the member-elect of the Minnesota House of Representatives for district 37A.

== Career ==
McKee was first elected mayor of Corcoran in 2020, defeating incumbent mayor Ron Thomas. He is currently serving his third two-year term as mayor of Corcoran.

McKee announced his candidacy for district 37A of the Minnesota House in May 2026. He won the general election in November, defeating Democratic–Farmer–Labor challenger Darci Smith to replace retiring incumbent Kristin Robbins.
