= Dayton's Bluff, Saint Paul =

Neighborhood in Saint Paul, Minnesota, United States

Coordinates: 44°57′24″N 93°3′20″W

Dayton's Bluff
- Neighborhood
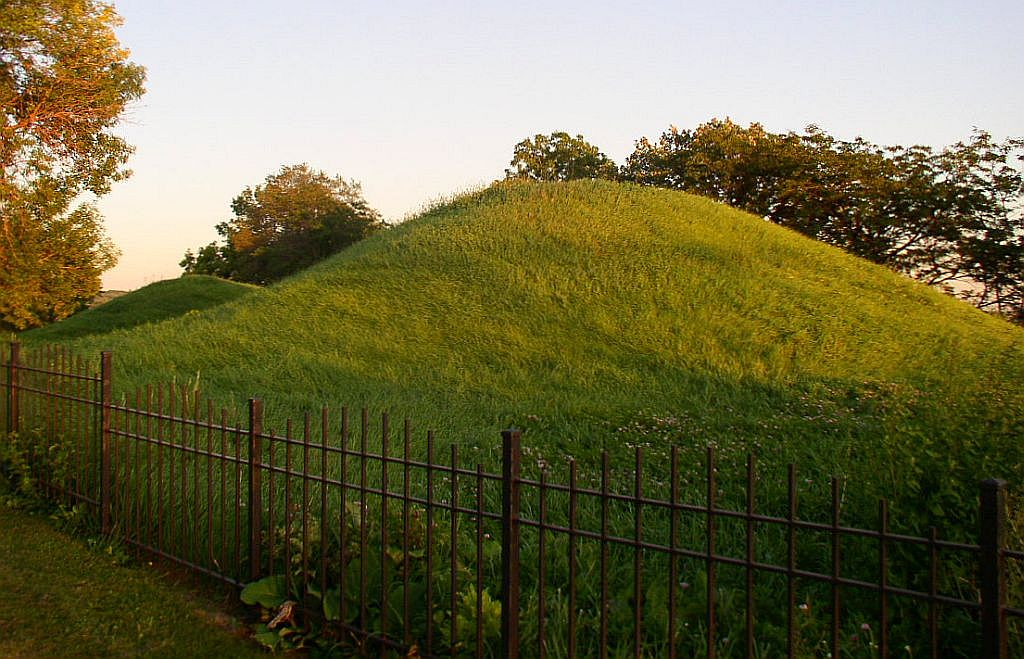
- Two of the prehistoric mounds in Indian Mounds Park
- Interactive map of Dayton's Bluff
- Country: United States
- State: Minnesota
- County: Ramsey
- City: Saint Paul

Area
  - Total: 2.837 sq mi (7.35 km^{2})

Population (2010)
  - Total: 17,916
  - Density: 6,315/sq mi (2,438/km^{2})
- Time zone: UTC-6 (CST)
  - Summer (DST): UTC-5 (CDT)
- ZIP code: 55101, 55106
- Area code: 651
- Website: http://www.daytonsbluff.org/

Dayton's Bluff is a neighborhood located on the east side of the Mississippi River in the southeast part of the city of Saint Paul, Minnesota which has a large residential district on the plateau extending backward from its top. The name of the bluff commemorates Lyman Dayton, for whom a city in Hennepin County was also named. On the edge of the southern and highest part of Dayton's Bluff, in Indian Mounds Park, is a series of seven large aboriginal mounds, 4 to 18 feet (1.2 to 5.5 m) high, that overlook the river and the central part of the city.

== History ==
Dayton's Bluff contains remnants of the earliest inhabitants of the Twin Cities. Indian Mounds Park preserves some of the burial sites of an early group that came to the area more than a thousand years ago.

Kaposia, a large Dakota Indian village, existed below Dayton's Bluff from the late seventeenth century until the mid-nineteenth century. Residents lived along the river and performed burial rites on the cliffs above. They were followed by the Métis and European-American farmers, often former Fort Snelling soldiers who tilled the land in the late 1830s and 1840s. The sacred site of Carver's Cave was destroyed by railroad construction in the 1880s.

The development of Dayton's Bluff as a suburban residential location began in the 1840s. The area was named for Lyman Dayton, land and railroad speculator who built a home on the Bluff in the 1850s. The area was separated from Saint Paul along the river by a ravine that was first bridged and was then filled. Many of the streets in the community were laid out parallel to the Mississippi River rather than north–south.

Feed, flour, and lumber mills were built in the area in the 1850s and used Phalen Creek as a source of water power. After a railroad was built north of East 7th Street in the late 1860s, more industries, including Hamm's Brewery, grew along its corridor. Soon a railroad depot called Post's Siding was built at present-day Earl Street and East 7th Street.

Because of its landscape and vistas, many wealthy residents, in particular, many German-Americans, constructed estates.

The Dayton's Bluff Historic District was approved by the St. Paul City Council in August 1992.

=== Lyman Dayton ===
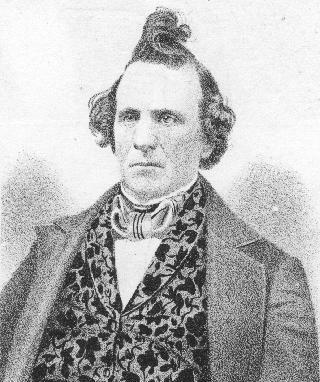
Lyman Dayton

Lyman Dayton was born in Southington, Connecticut, and died in St. Paul. He came to Minnesota in 1849, settled in St. Paul, invested largely in real estate, and was the president of the Lake Superior and Mississippi Railroad. The Lake Superior and Mississippi Railroad Company was incorporated under Minnesota legislation enacted in 1861 and received grants of lands approved by the U.S. General Land Office for transfer.

=== Other major figures in the development of Dayton's Bluff ===
Gates A. Johnson, Sr., (1826–1918) was the chief engineer of the Lake Superior and Mississippi Railroad Company from 1861 to 1870, the St. Paul City Engineer in 1860, the Ramsey County surveyor from 1864 to 1866, and the chief engineer of the Hastings, Minnesota River and Red River of the North Railroad Company in 1866. William L. Banning (1814–1893) was the president of the Lake Superior and Mississippi Railroad Company in 1866. William Branch & Company was engaged in surveying and construction on the Lake Superior & Mississippi Railroad from 1865 to 1869.

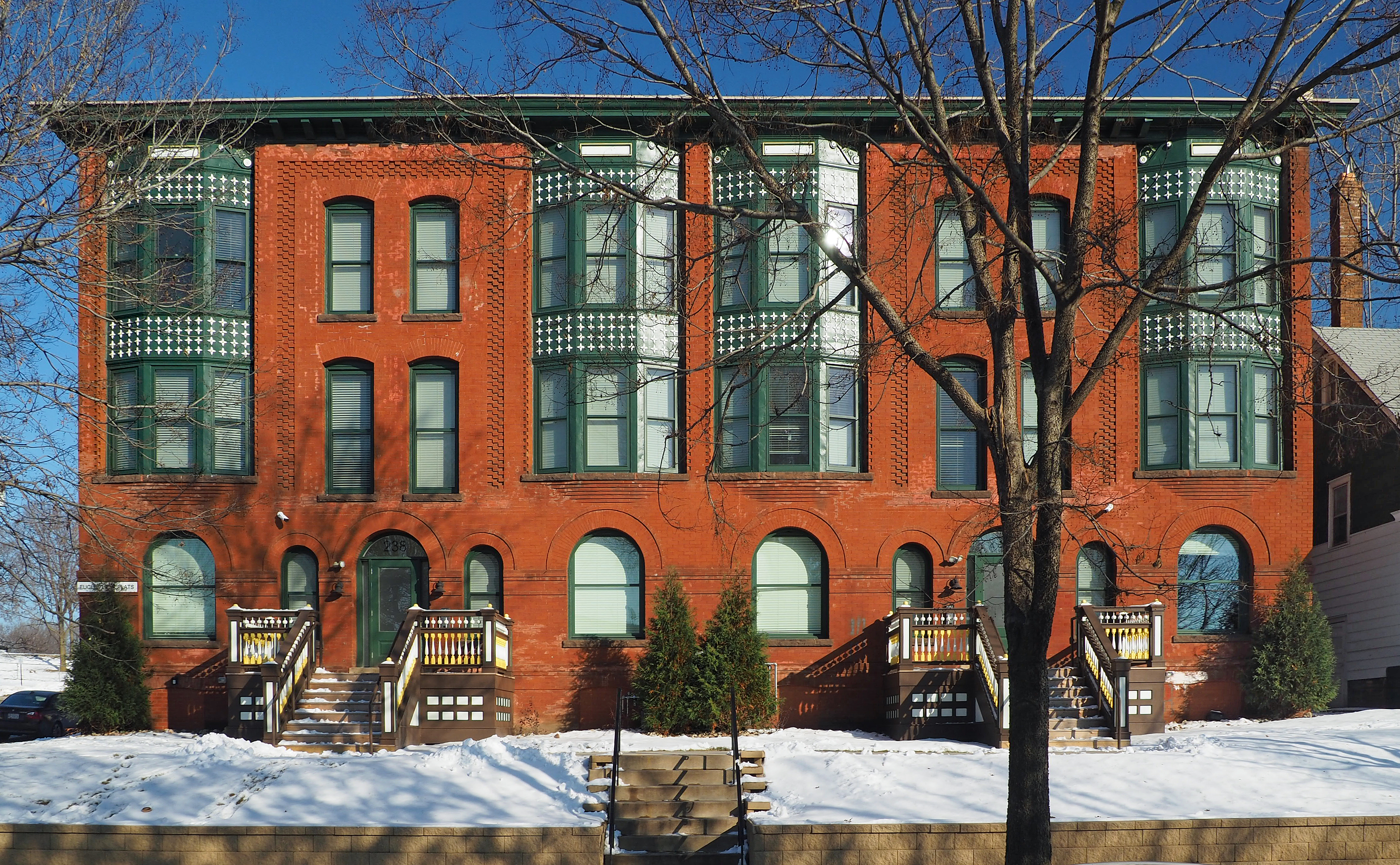
The Euclid View Flats, part of the Dayton's Bluff Historic District.

== Notable buildings ==
A historic house in the Dayton's Bluff area is the Wakefield House or the William Wakefield house located at 963 Wakefield Avenue, Saint Paul, Minnesota. The house was built in 1860 and the name of the street was changed to be named after the house in 1892. The house has since been restored.

The Schornstein Grocery and Saloon, designed by architect Augustus F. Gauger, was built in 1884. It was a popular gathering place for German-Americans, and is listed on the National Register of Historic Places.

== Industry ==
In 1910, Minnesota Mining and Manufacturing Company (3M) moved its headquarters and manufacturing facilities from Duluth to a single building on Forest Street in Dayton's Bluff, according to the Saint Paul Historical Research Team. 3M shut down their Saint Paul Plant in 2009. The building now houses the main offices of the Archdiocese of Saint Paul and Minneapolis.
