= John M. Armstrong House =

Historic house in Minnesota, United States

- U.S. National Register of Historic Places
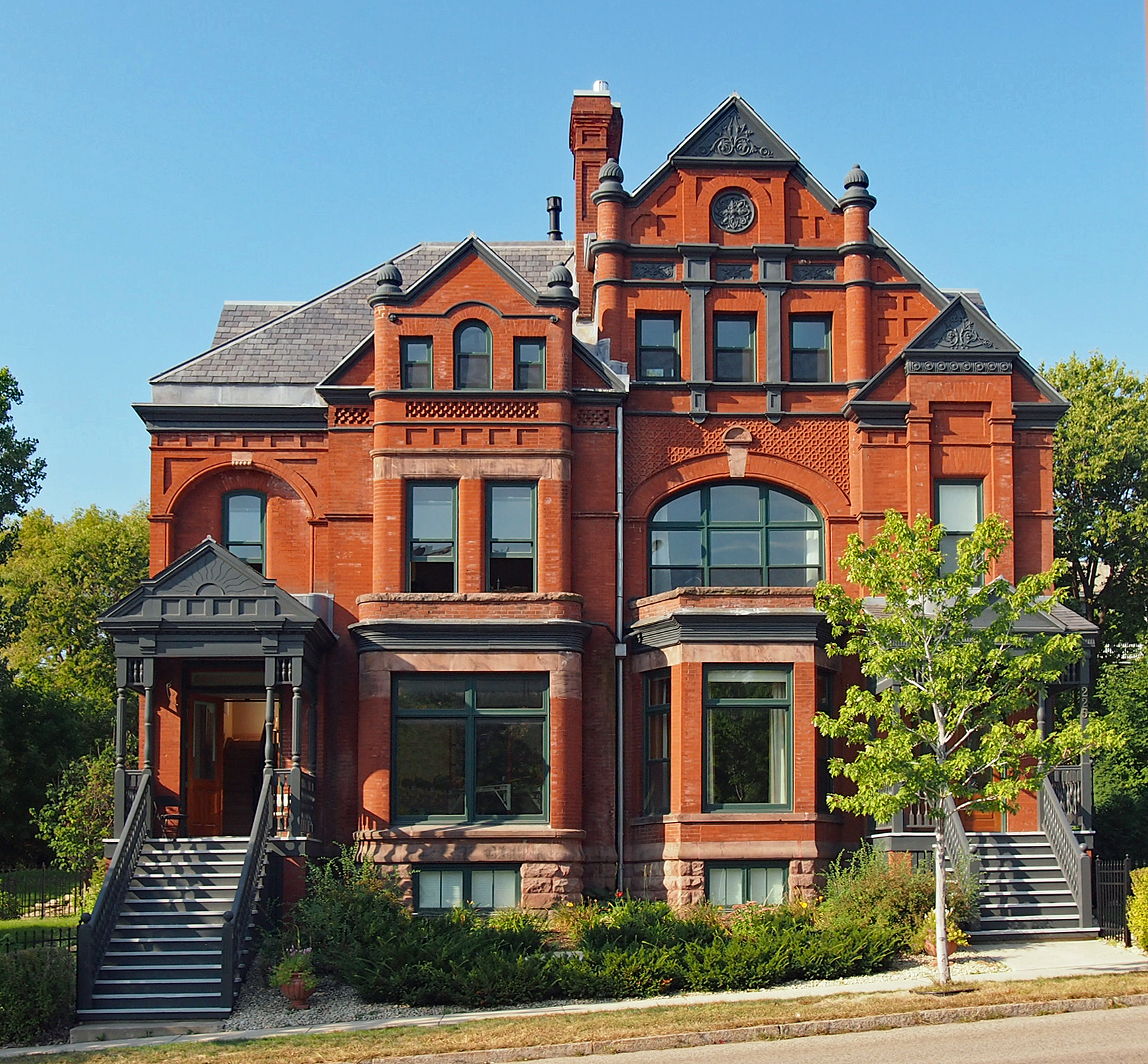

- Location within Minnesota Location within the United States
- Location: 225 Eagle Parkway; Saint Paul, Minnesota
- Coordinates: 44°56′28″N 93°6′3″W
- Built: 1886
- Architect: Edward P. Bassford; M. Costello
- Architectural style: Queen Anne, Richardsonian Romanesque
- NRHP reference No.: 83000925
- Added to NRHP: January 27, 1983

The John M. Armstrong House is in Saint Paul, Minnesota, United States. John Milton Armstrong, son of John Armstrong, Jr. (April 20, 1793 – December 22, 1865) hired architect Edward P. Bassford to design this side-by-side duplex in 1886 as income-producing residential housing. The red brick house was originally located at 233-235 West Fifth Street, but was moved to its present location on Eagle Parkway in November 2001.
