= Exchange Bank Building (Farmington, Minnesota) =

- U.S. National Register of Historic Places
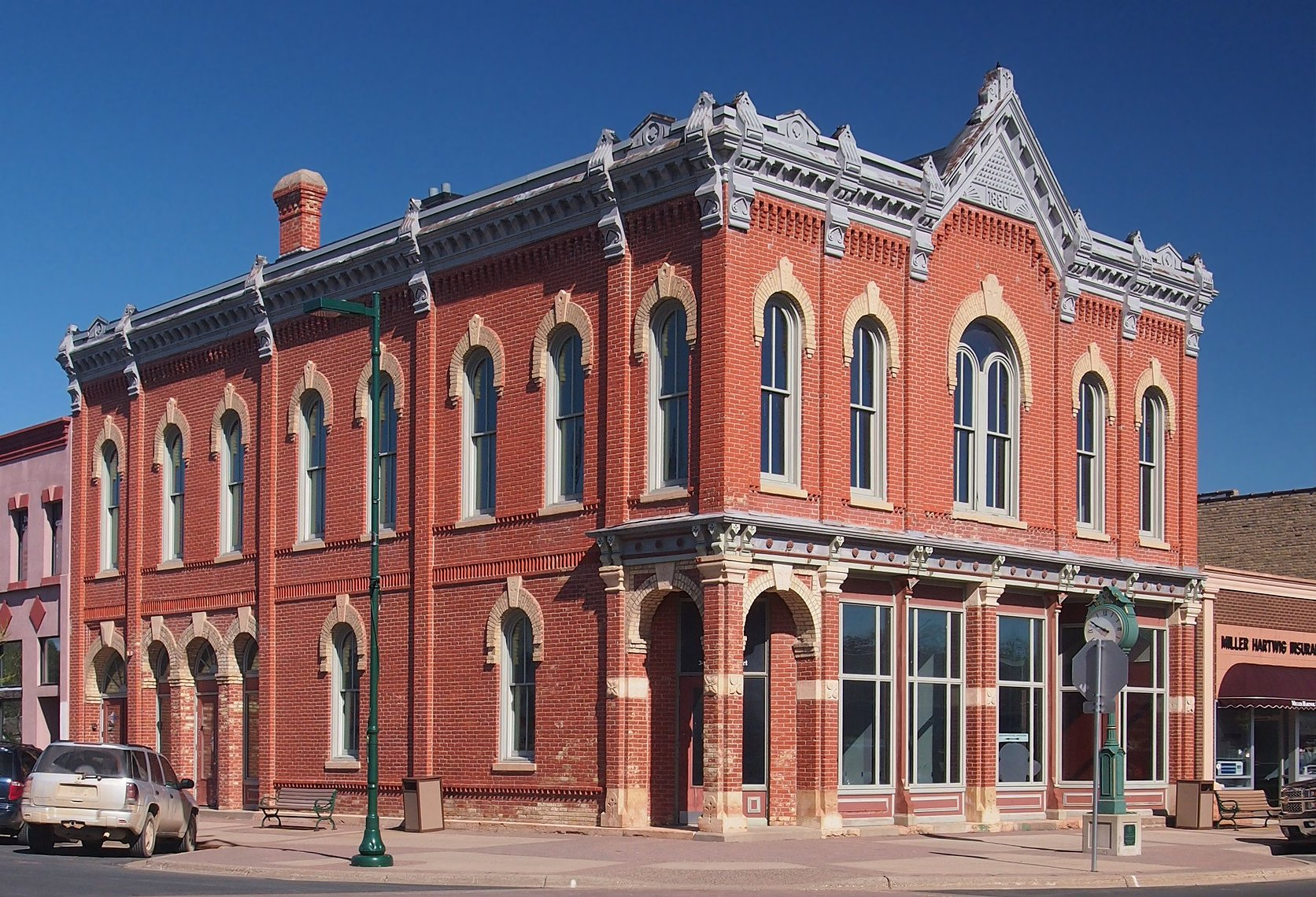
- The Exchange Bank Building from the southeast

- Location within Minnesota Location within the United States
- Location: 344 3rd Street, Farmington, Minnesota
- Coordinates: 44°38′21.7″N 93°8′43.5″W
- Built: 1880
- Architectural style: Italianate
- NRHP reference No.: 79001226
- Added to NRHP: December 31, 1979

The Exchange Bank Building was built in 1880 as the most prominent commercial building in Farmington in the U.S. state of Minnesota. It is the city's second-oldest commercial building. The Italianate and Romanesque brick building is located at 320 Third Street and was designed by Saint Paul's Augustus Gauger.

== Description ==
The Exchange Bank Building was built as a business block, meant to be the most prominent commercial building in downtown Farmington. It replaced an earlier frame building that was destroyed by a fire in 1879 that damaged much of Farmington's original business district.

When built, the Bank of Farmington was housed on one side of the ground floor with the post office at the rear of the building and a large meeting hall on the second floor. The Exchange Bank took over the property in 1896 after the Bank of Farmington failed. Additional businesses in the space included a saloon, hardware store, billiard parlor, and cafe.
