= Corcoran, Minnesota =

City in Minnesota, United States

- City
- Seal
- Motto: "A Hidden Gem Waiting To Be Discovered"
- Location of the city of Corcoran within Hennepin County, Minnesota
- Coordinates: 45°6′14″N 93°34′26″W
- Country: United States
- State: Minnesota
- County: Hennepin
- Incorporated: 1948

Government
  - Mayor: Tom McKee

Area
  - Total: 36.08 sq mi (93.45 km^{2})
  - Land: 35.80 sq mi (92.72 km^{2})
  - Water: 0.28 sq mi (0.72 km^{2})
- Elevation: 968 ft (295 m)

Population (2020)
  - Total: 6,185
  - Density: 173/sq mi (66.7/km^{2})
- Time zone: UTC-6 (Central (CST))
  - Summer (DST): UTC-5 (CDT)
- ZIP codes: 55340
- Area code: 763
- FIPS code: 27-13168
- GNIS feature ID: 0641493
- Website: https://www.corcoranmn.gov/

Corcoran is a rural city in Hennepin County, Minnesota, United States. The population was 6,185 at the 2020 census.

== Geography ==
According to the United States Census Bureau, the city has a total area of 36.00 square miles (93.24 km^{2}), of which 35.72 square miles (92.51 km^{2}) is land and 0.28 square miles (0.73 km^{2}) is water. County Roads 10, 19, 30, 50, 116, and 117 are six of the main routes. Minnesota State Highway 55 briefly passes along the southern edge of the city.

Corcoran shares borders with five cities. Maple Grove to the east, Medina to the south, Greenfield to the west, Rogers to the north, and Hanover in the northwest portion of the city. Dayton, Plymouth, Rockford, and Loretto are located close to Corcoran.

== History ==
Corcoran was settled in 1855, and was organized on May 11, 1858. The city it is 1921 Patrick B. Corcoran, the first schoolteacher, merchant, and postmaster of the town. Patrick B. Corcoran was originally from Ireland, but moved to the United States in 1847, and to Hennepin County in 1855. The city of Corcoran was incorporated on December 4, 1948.

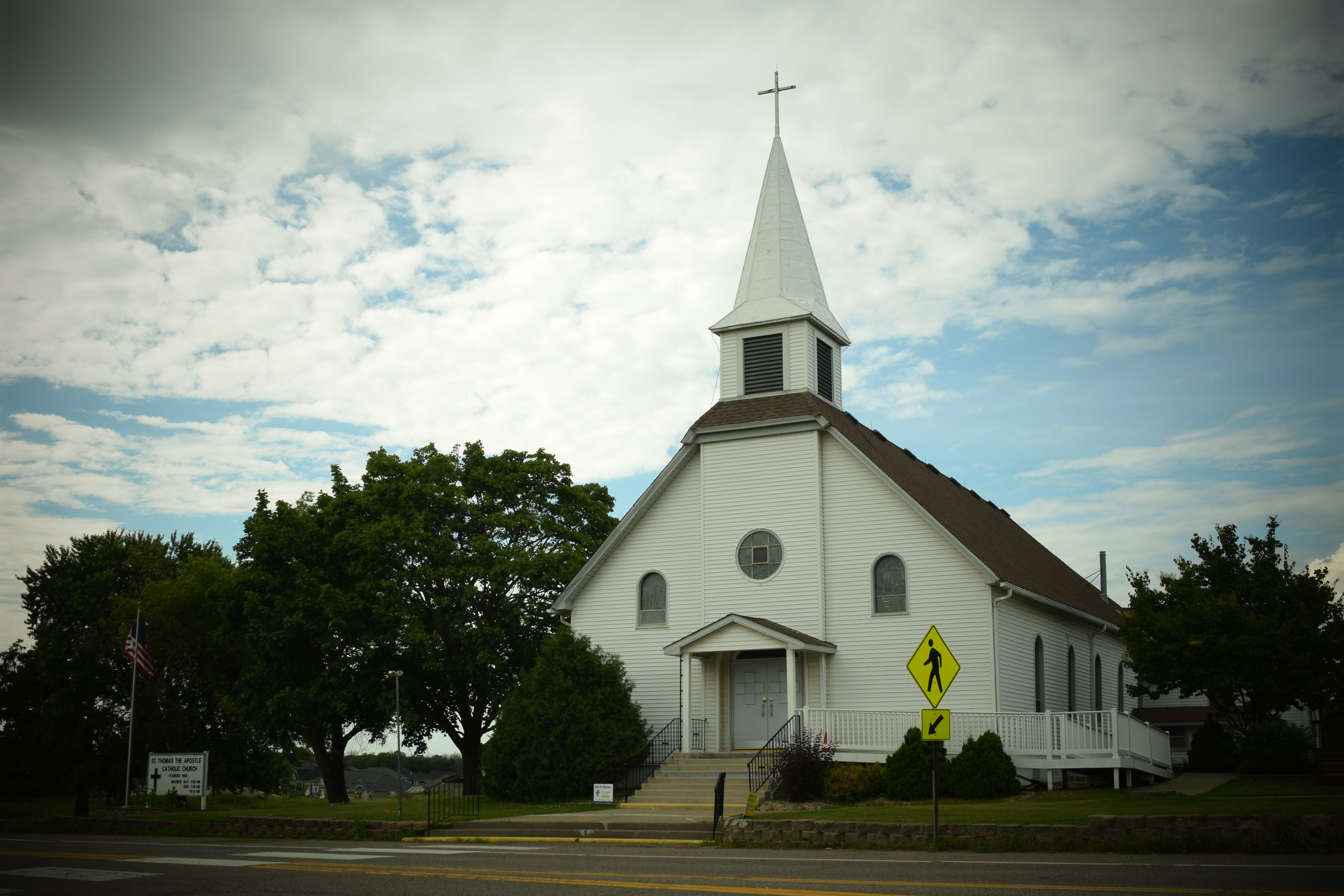
The Historic c.1896 St. Thomas the Apostle Church

== Demographics ==
Historical population
Census	Pop.	Note	%±
1860	358		—
1870	914		155.3%
1880	1,174		28.4%
1890	1,212		3.2%
1900	1,338		10.4%
1910	1,235		−7.7%
1920	1,212		−1.9%
1930	1,252		3.3%
1940	1,225		−2.2%
1950	1,135		−7.3%
1960	1,237		9.0%
1970	1,656		33.9%
1980	4,252		156.8%
1990	5,199		22.3%
2000	5,630		8.3%
2010	5,379		−4.5%
2020	6,185		15.0%
U.S. Decennial Census

=== 2020 census ===
As of the 2020 census, Corcoran had a population of 6,185. The median age was 41.3 years. 24.6% of residents were under the age of 18 and 15.6% of residents were 65 years of age or older. For every 100 females there were 105.0 males, and for every 100 females age 18 and over there were 105.1 males age 18 and over.

23.7% of residents lived in urban areas, while 76.3% lived in rural areas.

There were 2,174 households in Corcoran, of which 35.6% had children under the age of 18 living in them. Of all households, 72.5% were married-couple households, 12.3% were households with a male householder and no spouse or partner present, and 10.3% were households with a female householder and no spouse or partner present. About 13.1% of all households were made up of individuals and 5.7% had someone living alone who was 65 years of age or older.

There were 2,244 housing units, of which 3.1% were vacant. The homeowner vacancy rate was 1.4% and the rental vacancy rate was 1.9%.

Racial composition as of the 2020 census
Race	Number	Percent
White	5,016	81.1%
Black or African American	27	0.4%
American Indian and Alaska Native	23	0.4%
Asian	623	10.1%
Native Hawaiian and Other Pacific Islander	0	0.0%
Some other race	219	3.5%
Two or more races	277	4.5%
Hispanic or Latino (of any race)	330	5.3%

=== 2010 census ===
As of the census of 2010, there were 5,379 people, 1,867 households, and 1,543 families living in the city. The population density was 150.6 inhabitants per square mile (58.1/km^{2}). There were 1,919 housing units at an average density of 53.7 per square mile (20.7/km^{2}). The racial makeup of the city was 92.8% White, 0.4% African American, 0.5% Native American, 3.4% Asian, 1.7% from other races, and 1.2% from two or more races. Hispanic or Latino of any race were 2.8% of the population.

There were 1,867 households, of which 33.6% had children under the age of 18 living with them, 73.2% were married couples living together, 5.0% had a female householder with no husband present, 4.4% had a male householder with no wife present, and 17.4% were non-families. 12.4% of all households were made up of individuals, and 3.1% had someone living alone who was 65 years of age or older. The average household size was 2.88 and the average family size was 3.14.

The median age in the city was 44.4 years. 25.1% of residents were under the age of 18; 7.8% were between the ages of 18 and 24; 18.1% were from 25 to 44; 39.7% were from 45 to 64; and 9.3% were 65 years of age or older. The gender makeup of the city was 52.0% male and 48.0% female.

=== 2000 census ===
As of the census of 2000, there were 5,630 people, 1,784 households, and 1,512 families living in the city. The population density was 157.4 inhabitants per square mile (60.8/km^{2}). There were 1,804 housing units at an average density of 50.4 per square mile (19.5/km^{2}). The racial makeup of the city was 96.70% White, 0.20% African American, 0.20% Native American, 1.76% Asian, 0.37% from other races, and 0.78% from two or more races. Hispanic or Latino of any race were 0.87% of the population. 36.3% were of German, 15.4% Norwegian, 7.8% Swedish and 7.0% Irish ancestry.

There were 1,784 households, out of which 47.6% had children under the age of 18 living with them, 76.5% were married couples living together, 5.0% had a female householder with no husband present, and 15.2% were non-families. 10.5% of all households were made up of individuals, and 2.2% had someone living alone who was 65 years of age or older. The average household size was 3.16 and the average family size was 3.42.

In the city, the population was spread out, with 32.7% under the age of 18, 6.8% from 18 to 24, 31.6% from 25 to 44, 24.4% from 45 to 64, and 4.5% who were 65 years of age or older. The median age was 36 years. For every 100 females, there were 108.5 males. For every 100 females age 18 and over, there were 108.5 males.

The median income for a household in the city was $78,984, and the median income for a family was $81,322. Males had a median income of $46,491 versus $34,078 for females. The per capita income for the city was $29,467. About 0.5% of families and 0.9% of the population were below the poverty line, including 0.5% of those under age 18 and 4.4% of those age 65 or over.

== Notable people ==
- Arlon Lindner, Minnesota state representative
