= Maple Grove, Minnesota =

City in Minnesota, United States

- City
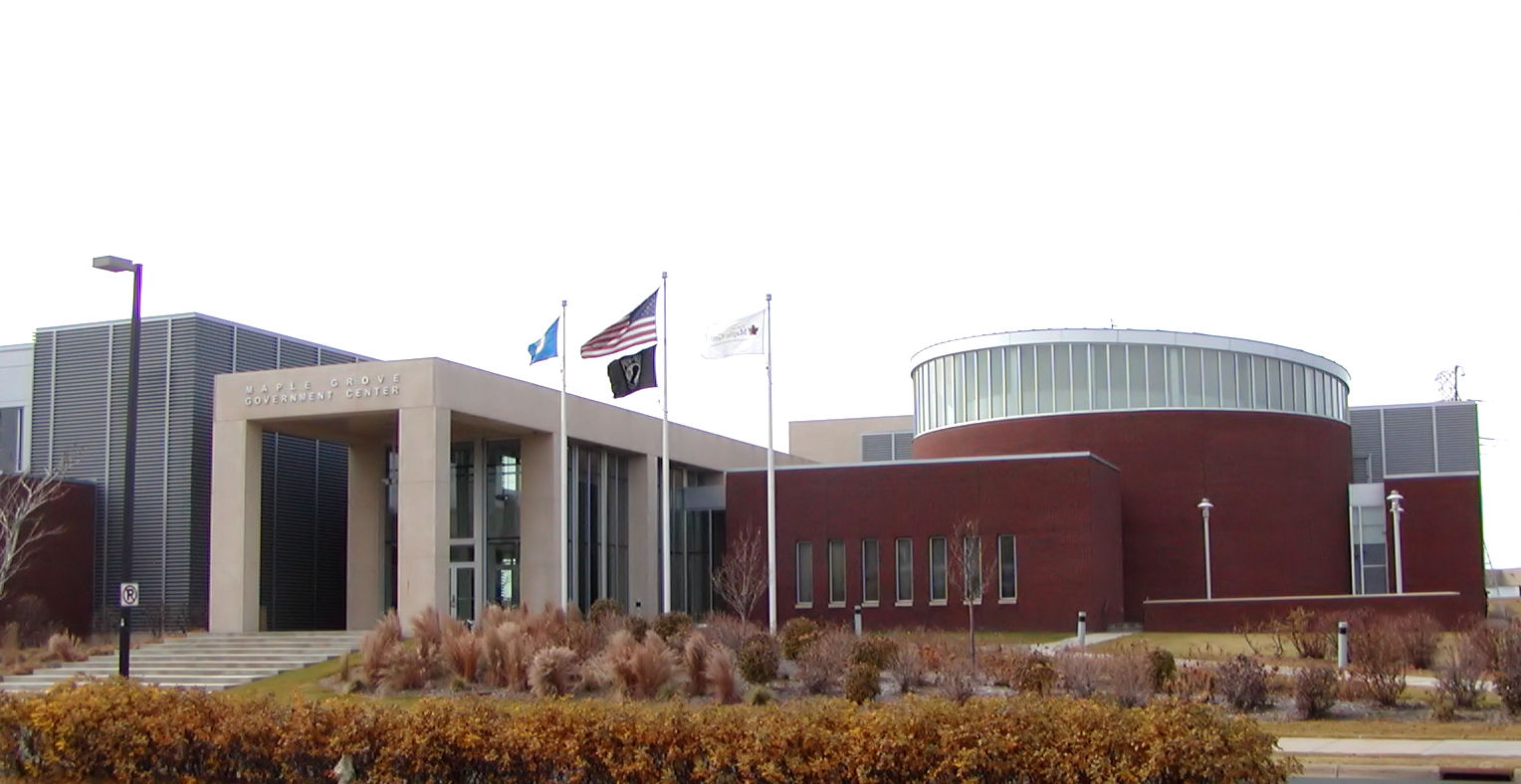
- Maple Grove Government Center

- Flag Logo
- Nicknames: The Grove, The Groove, "MG"
- Motto(s): Serving Today, Shaping Tomorrow
- Location of Maple Grove within Hennepin County, Minnesota
- Coordinates: 45°04′21″N 93°27′20″W
- Country: United States
- State: Minnesota
- County: Hennepin
- Founded: 1858
- Incorporated: April 30, 1954

Government
  - Type: Mayor-council
  - Mayor: Mark Steffenson

Area
  - City: 35.05 sq mi (90.78 km^{2})
  - Land: 32.57 sq mi (84.36 km^{2})
  - Water: 2.47 sq mi (6.41 km^{2})
- Elevation: 935 ft (285 m)

Population (2020)
  - City: 70,253
  - Estimate (2025): 73,893
  - Rank: US: 535th MN: 11th
  - Density: 2,156.8/sq mi (832.75/km^{2})
  - Metro: 3,693,729 (US: 16th)
- Time zone: UTC-6 (Central (CST))
  - Summer (DST): UTC-5 (CDT)
- ZIP codes: 55311, 55369
- Area code: 763
- FIPS code: 27-40166
- GNIS feature ID: 0647465
- Website: maplegrovemn.gov

Maple Grove is a suburban city in Hennepin County, Minnesota, United States. The population was 70,253 at the 2020 census. making it Minnesota's 11th most populous city.

Maple Grove serves as a retail, cultural and medical center in the northwest region of the Minneapolis–Saint Paul metropolitan area. One of the Twin Cities' largest shopping centers, The Shoppes at Arbor Lakes, is in Maple Grove. Maple Grove is also home to the Hindu Temple of Minnesota, the state's largest Hindu temple.

== History ==
Winnebago were the only inhabitants in the Maple Grove area until 1851, when Louis Gervais arrived and settled. Four years later, city growth included a church, town hall, and many homes. The Pierre Bottineau House was the first wood-frame house built in Maple Grove Township, in 1854. The house has been moved from its original location and is now in the Elm Creek Park Reserve. The city was known for its large stands of maple trees and was a significant source of maple syrup. On July 23, 1987, Maple Grove was hit by an F3 tornado, causing damage to homes and businesses. The tornado then moved into neighboring Brooklyn Park and caused damage in several subdivisions before dissipating.

With the completion and major upgrades to Interstates 94 / 694, 494, and U.S. Highway 169, Maple Grove has grown at a rapid pace since the 1970s. It is one of the most populous cities in the Twin Cities area and one of the fastest-growing cities in the state. Maple Grove was also named the second-best place to live in 2014 by Money magazine.

== Geography ==
According to the United States Census Bureau, the city has an area of 35.03 square miles (90.73 km^{2}), of which 32.64 square miles (84.54 km^{2}) is land and 2.39 square miles (6.19 km^{2}) is water.

There are 13 named lakes in the city: Arbor Lake, Cedar Island Lake, Cook Lake, Eagle Lake, Edward Lake, Fish Lake, North Arbor Lake, Mud Lake, Pike Lake, Rice Lake including its Outlet and West Bay, Teal Lake, Weaver Lake, and West Arbor Lake.

Maple Grove directly borders six other cities: Dayton, Champlin, Brooklyn Park, Osseo, Plymouth, and Corcoran. It is also near Medina, Rogers, New Hope, and Minneapolis.

Many major highways pass through the city. Interstate 94 intersects with Interstate 494 and Interstate 694 at the Fish Lake split. U.S. Route 169 runs north–south along the eastern border of the city with Brooklyn Park. Minnesota State Highway 610 runs east–west in the northern portion of the city. Hennepin County maintains most of city's large thoroughfares, including County Road 10 (Bass Lake Road), County Road 30, County Road 61 (Hemlock Lane), County Road 81, County Road 101, County Road 109 (Weaver Lake Road), County Road 121 (Maple Grove Parkway), and County Road 130 (Elm Creek Boulevard).

== Demographics ==
Historical population
Census	Pop.	Note	%±
1890	1,197		—
1900	1,237		3.3%
1910	1,211		−2.1%
1920	1,083		−10.6%
1930	1,113		2.8%
1940	1,251		12.4%
1950	1,778		42.1%
1960	2,213		24.5%
1970	6,275		183.6%
1980	20,525		227.1%
1990	38,736		88.7%
2000	50,365		30.0%
2010	61,567		22.2%
2020	70,253		14.1%
2025 (est.)	73,893		5.2%
U.S. Decennial Census; 2020 Census

=== 2020 census ===
As of the 2020 census, Maple Grove had a population of 70,253. The median age was 39.7 years. 24.3% of residents were under the age of 18 and 14.4% of residents were 65 years of age or older. For every 100 females there were 95.0 males, and for every 100 females age 18 and over there were 92.2 males age 18 and over.

99.7% of residents lived in urban areas, while 0.3% lived in rural areas.

There were 26,728 households in Maple Grove, of which 34.4% had children under the age of 18 living in them. Of all households, 60.8% were married-couple households, 11.9% were households with a male householder and no spouse or partner present, and 21.8% were households with a female householder and no spouse or partner present. About 21.5% of all households were made up of individuals and 8.6% had someone living alone who was 65 years of age or older.

There were 27,507 housing units, of which 2.8% were vacant. The homeowner vacancy rate was 0.7% and the rental vacancy rate was 5.8%.

Racial composition as of the 2020 census
Race	Number	Percent
White	54,773	78.0%
Black or African American	4,514	6.4%
American Indian and Alaska Native	247	0.4%
Asian	5,380	7.7%
Native Hawaiian and Other Pacific Islander	18	0.0%
Some other race	1,021	1.5%
Two or more races	4,300	6.1%
Hispanic or Latino (of any race)	2,449	3.5%

=== 2010 census ===
As of the census of 2010, there were 61,567 people, 22,867 households, and 17,222 families living in the city. The population density was 1,886.2 inhabitants per square mile (728.3/km^{2}). There were 23,626 housing units at an average density of 723.8 units per square mile (279.5 units/km^{2}). The racial makeup of the city was 86.4% White, 4.2% African American, 0.3% Native American, 6.2% Asian, 0.8% from other races, and 2.2% from two or more races. Hispanic or Latino of any race were 2.5% of the population.

There were 22,867 households, of which 39.4% had children under the age of 18 living with them, 64.0% were married couples living together, 8.3% had a female householder with no husband present, 3.0% had a male householder with no wife present, and 24.7% were non-families. Of all households, 19.3% were made up of individuals, and 4.8% had someone living alone who was 65 years of age or older. The average household size was 2.69 and the average family size was 3.12.

The median age in the city was 37.6 years. 26.9% of residents were under the age of 18; 6.4% were between the ages of 18 and 24; 28.8% were from 25 to 44; 30.7% were from 45 to 64; 7.4% were 65 years of age or older. The gender makeup of the city was 48.8% male and 51.2% female.

=== 2000 census ===
As of the census of 2000, there were 50,365 people (10th largest city in Minnesota), 17,532 households, and 13,955 families living in the city. The population density was 1,532.3 inhabitants per square mile (591.6/km^{2}). There were 17,745 housing units at an average density of 539.9 units per square mile (208.5 units/km^{2}). The racial makeup of the city was 94.7% White 1.05% African American, 0.24% Native American, 2.52% Asian, 0.04% Pacific Islander, 0.1% from other races, and 1.04% from two or more races. Hispanic or Latino of any race were 1.06% of the populations. 31.9% were of German, 14.0% Norwegian, 8.5% Swedish and 7.9% Irish ancestry.

There were 17,532 households, out of which 46.3% had children under the age of 18 living with them, 69.5% were married couples living together, 7.5% had a female householder with no husband present, and 20.4% were non-families. Of all households, 15.8% were made up of individuals, and 2.6% had someone living alone who was 65 years of age or older. The average household size was 2.87 and the average family size was 3.24.

In the city, the population was spread out, with 30.8% under the age of 18, 6.6% from 18 to 24, 34.8% from 25 to 44, 23.7% from 45 to 64, and 4.1% who were 65 years of age or older. The median age was 34 years. For every 100 females, there were 98.0 males. For every 100 females age 18 and over, there were 94.9 males.

== Economy ==
Maple Grove is home to a regional Boston Scientific research, development, and manufacturing facility, employing over 3,000 people. Other major employers include Independent School District 279, Nortech Systems, and the city of Maple Grove.

The city is home to a 2,000-acre (8.1 km^{2}) gravel mining area owned by Tiller Corporation and C.S. McCrossan. Active since the 1920s, the GMA is slowly being developed into a residential and commercial downtown. The first phase included Main Street, a collection of one- and two-story buildings with storefronts in new urbanist (or neotraditional) style. The second phase was generally considered to be the Shoppes of Arbor Lakes and the third phase was the Fountains at Arbor Lakes.

Minnesota's first so-called "lifestyle center", The Shoppes at Arbor Lakes, is designed in the spirit of a mid-century American village. The center was built in 2003 and has been replicated in Woodbury, Minnesota (Woodbury Lakes). The development is 412,000 square feet (38,300 m^{2})and is home to more than 65 stores and restaurants.

An additional phase of Arbor Lakes development is a hybrid power center development called The Fountains at Arbor Lakes. At 850,000 square feet (79,000 m^{2}), this retail complex includes a water park. The Fountains also includes Minnesota's most energy-efficient building, Great River Energy Headquarters. Maple Grove's Main Street area is part of the Arbor Lakes retail area. The Village at Arbor Lakes includes hotels, restaurants, and additional retail space.

The Grove is at the intersection of Interstate 94 and Maple Grove Parkway in northwest Maple Grove. This district is home to the new North Memorial/Fairview hospital complex and stores. The project's central portion is designed to be pedestrian-friendly and encourage a small-town atmosphere.

Maple Grove is home to more retail than nearly any other city in the state, second only to Bloomington, home of the Mall of America. Maple Grove likely has nearly 6 million square feet (560,000 m^{2}) of commercial development at build-out, which may soon push the city into the number one spot for retail square footage. One prominent retail complex is the Grove Square shopping mall. Opus Northwest, the developer of the property, selected the location of the initial property development because "it’s the first major city in upstate Minnesota" and serves as "a major hub for that submarket" drawing consumers from the entire upstate region.

== Government ==
United States presidential election results for Maple Grove, Minnesota
Year	Republican		Democratic		Third party(ies)	
Year	No.	%	No.	%	No.	%
2000	14,727	52.82%	11,802	42.33%	1,352	4.85%
2004	19,613	56.97%	14,519	42.17%	296	0.86%
2008	18,979	51.70%	17,231	46.93%	503	1.37%
2012	20,599	53.05%	17,535	45.16%	696	1.79%
2016	17,414	44.13%	18,399	46.63%	3,646	9.24%
2020	18,920	41.95%	25,078	55.60%	1,103	2.45%
2024	18,240	40.87%	25,215	56.51%	1,169	2.62%

Maple Grove is served by a city council consisting of a mayor and four council members who all serve four-year terms. City Council members serve at large. City elections coincide with the general elections held in the fall of all even-numbered years. Mark Steffenson is the current mayor and has served since June 2001. Current city council members are Rachelle Johnson, Kristy Janigo, Mike Ostaffe, and Jon McCullough

The first town hall was authorized and built in 1877 and was used until 1939. In 1974, Maple Grove became a city. A new town hall was constructed on Fernbrook Lane. The first city council meeting was held in this building on August 4, 1975. The current Government Center opened in October 2000.

On May 6, 1974, the city council voted to establish a volunteer fire department. In 1986, the original fire station was closed and two new stations were built. There are five fire stations in the city.

Maple Grove is in the 7th District of Hennepin County. The commissioner for the 7th district is Kevin Anderson.

Representative Kristin Robbins, a Republican (District 37A) and Kristin Bahner, a Democrat (District 37B), represent the city in the Minnesota House of Representatives. Republican senator Warren Limmer (District 37) represents Maple Grove in the Minnesota Senate.

Maple Grove is in Minnesota's 3rd congressional district, represented by Kelly Morrison, a Democrat.

== Education ==
Maple Grove's public schools are part of Osseo Area School District 279, which also serves Brooklyn Center, Brooklyn Park, Plymouth, Corcoran, Dayton and Rogers. Maple Grove Senior High School is the only public high school in the city. The superintendent is Dr. Kim Hiel. Part of Maple Grove is also served by Wayzata Public Schools. Private schools in Maple Grove include Heritage Christian Academy, Ave Maria Academy, and Parnassus Preparatory School.

== Notable people ==
- Alasan Ann, Professional taekwondo player, representing The Gambia in the 2024 Summer Olympics
- Jimmy Brown, jazz musician
- Dale Clausnitzer, Minnesota politician and businessman
- Isaac Collins, Major League Baseball player for the Kansas City Royals
- Brock Faber, Professional hockey player, Minnesota Wild
- Luke Haakenson, former Nashville SC player
- Warren Limmer, Minnesota politician
- Patrick D. McGowan, Minnesota politician and law enforcement officer
- Mannon McMahon, Professional hockey player on the Vancouver Goldeneyes
- ODB, American professional wrestler
- Sisqó (Mark Althavean Andrews), singer
- Brian Thompson, former CEO of UnitedHealthcare, the insurance arm of UnitedHealth Group
- Jesse Ventura, 38th governor of Minnesota
- Kurt Zellers, Former Minnesota Speaker of the House
