= Joyce Peppin =

American politician

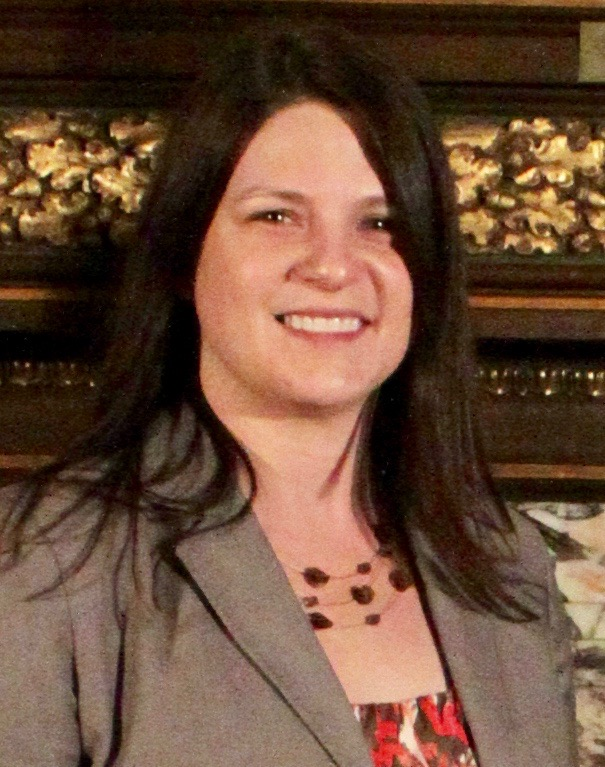
- Peppin in 2012

Majority Leader of the Minnesota House of Representatives
- In office January 6, 2015 – July 2, 2018
- Preceded by: Erin Murphy
- Succeeded by: Ryan Winkler

Member of the Minnesota House of Representatives from the 34A district 32A (2005–2013)
- In office January 4, 2005 – July 2, 2018
- Preceded by: Arlon Lindner
- Succeeded by: Kristin Robbins

Personal details
- Born: July 2, 1970 (age 56) Randall, Minnesota, U.S.
- Party: Republican
- Spouse: Gregg
- Children: 2
- Education: University of Minnesota, Duluth (BA); University of St. Thomas, Minnesota (MBA)

Joyce J. Peppin (born July 2, 1970) is an American politician and former majority leader of the Minnesota House of Representatives. A member of the Republican Party of Minnesota, she represented District 34A, which included portions of Hennepin County in the northwestern Twin Cities metropolitan area.

== Early life, education, and career ==
Raised on a farm near Randall, Peppin graduated from Little Falls High School in Little Falls, then attended the University of Minnesota in Duluth, receiving her B.A. in political science and speech communications in 1992. In 2007, she earned her M.B.A. at the University of St. Thomas in Saint Paul. She was a communications consultant for the Minnesota House from 1992 to 1997, worked as a communications manager and vice president of public relations for U.S. Bancorp from 1997 to 2001, and was a communications specialist for the Minnesota House Republican Caucus until running for the House herself in 2004.

Peppin has also been active in her local community, serving on the Hassan Township Parks Commission from 1998 to 2004, as a member of the I-94 West Chamber of Commerce, and as chair of the Mary Queen of Peace Catholic School Advisory Board from 2002 to 2004.

== Minnesota House of Representatives ==
Peppin was first elected in 2004; and she was reelected in 2006, 2008, 2010, 2012, 2014, and 2016. In 2015, she became Majority Leader of the Minnesota House of Representatives. She resigned effective July 2, 2018, to join the Minnesota Rural Electric Association as director of government affairs and general counsel.

=== Elections ===
2014 Minnesota State Representative- House 34A
Party	Candidate	Votes	%	±%
Republican	Joyce Peppin (Incumbent)	12,411	97.05	+32.81

2012 Minnesota State Representative- House 34A
Party	Candidate	Votes	%	±%
Democratic (DFL)	Adam Fisher	7983	35.65	
Republican	Joyce Peppin (Incumbent)	14386	64.24	−6.73

2010 Minnesota State Representative- House 32A
Party	Candidate	Votes	%	±%
Democratic (DFL)	David B. Hoden	6556	28.95	
Republican	Joyce Peppin (Incumbent)	16072	70.97	+4.74

2008 Minnesota State Representative- House 32A
Party	Candidate	Votes	%	±%
Democratic (DFL)	Grace A. Baltich	9827	33.65	−1.52
Republican	Joyce Peppin (Incumbent)	19340	66.23	+1.48

2006 Minnesota State Representative- House 32A
Party	Candidate	Votes	%	±%
Democratic (DFL)	Grace A. Baltich	7591	35.17	
Republican	Joyce Peppin (Incumbent)	13977	64.75	+10.93

2004 Minnesota State Representative- House 32A
Party	Candidate	Votes	%	±%
Democratic (DFL)	Caroll Holmstrom	7122	26.82	
Republican	Joyce Peppin	14273	53.82	
Independence	Arlon Lindner	5114	19.28	

Minnesota House of Representatives
Preceded by Arlon Lindner	Member of the Minnesota House of Representatives from District 34A; 2005–2018	Succeeded by Kristin Robbins
Preceded by Erin Murphy	Majority Leader of the Minnesota House of Representatives; 2015–2018	Succeeded by Ryan Winkler
