= Edward Bassford =

American architect (1837–1912)

- Born: June 7, 1837
- Died: July 20, 1912 (aged 75)
- Occupation: Architect
- Years active: 1866-1912

Edward Payson Bassford (1837–1912) was an architect who practiced in St. Paul, Minnesota, in the late 19th century.

== Biography ==
Born in Calais, Maine, on June 7, 1837, Bassford worked as a carpenter with his father, who operated a house-building business. He worked as an apprentice for architect Charles Painter. After serving in the Civil War, Bassford partnered with Thomas J. Sparrow in Maine as a professional architect.

Bassford moved to St. Paul in 1866. He worked in the office of Abraham Radcliffe for a time, then founded his own architectural firm. By the 1870s, Bassford was the busiest architect in St. Paul, working on designs for houses, schools, and many commercial buildings, including the "old" St. Paul post office, the Ramsey County Courthouse, the Merchants National Bank Building, and the Germania Bank Building. His firm also employed architects who later were famous in their own right, such as Cass Gilbert, Augustus Gauger, Edward J. Donohue, Silas Jacobson, and Charles Bassford.

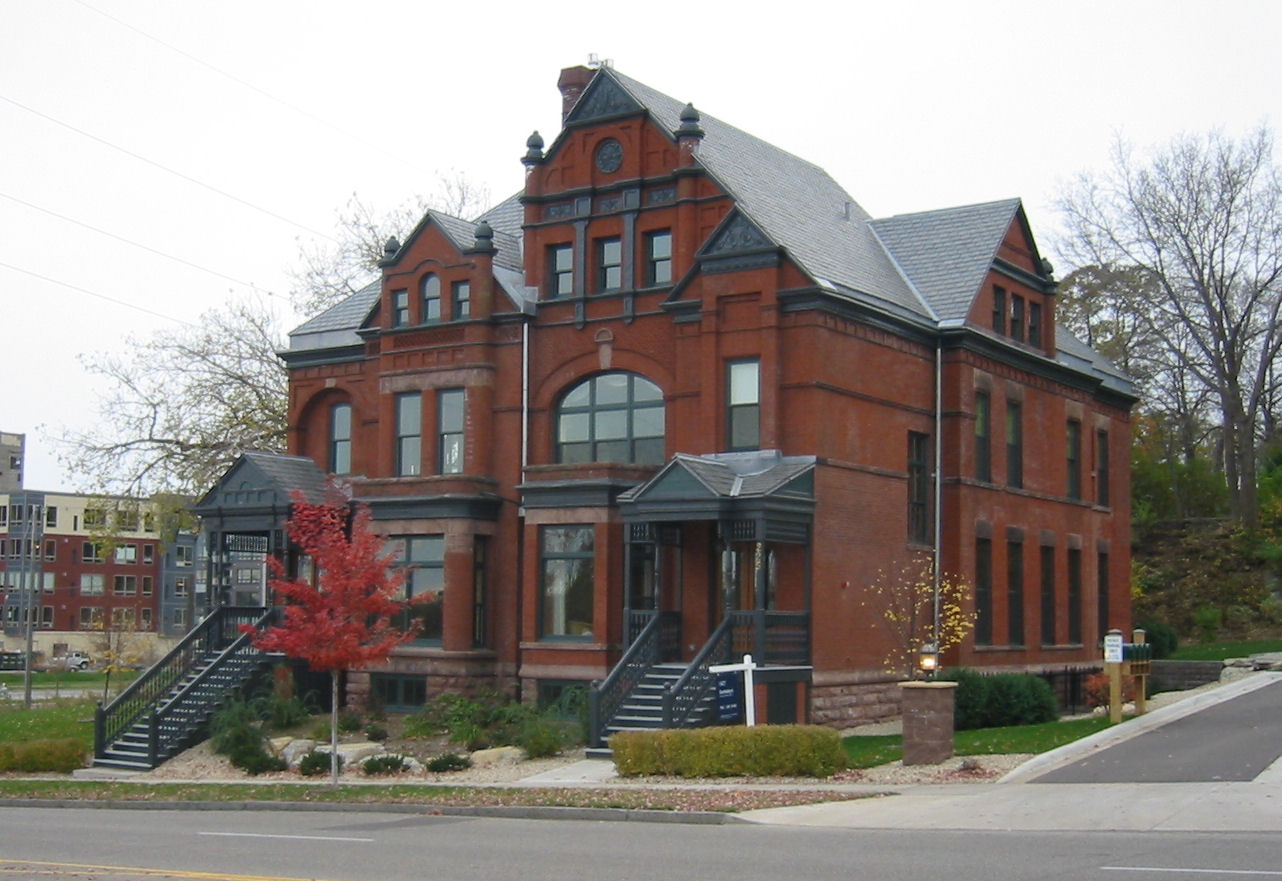
The John M. Armstrong House is one of Bassford's designs.

Bassford died in Osakis, Minnesota, on July 20, 1912. His son Charles A. Bassford served as the fourth City Architect of the City of St Paul and his Asher Bassford brother also worked as an architect and contractor in St. Paul.

== Works ==
Several of Bassford's designs are listed on the National Register of Historic Places. These include:

- John M. Armstrong House, 225 Eagle Parkway, St. Paul, MN
- Frederic A. Donahower House 1873, Minnesota Avenue and Locust Street, St. Peter, MN
- The Murray-Lanpher House in Irvine Park Historic District, St. Paul, MN
- The O'Hara-Mackaman House, 416 Laurel Avenue, St. Paul, MN.
- Merchants National Bank (Saint Paul), 366-368 Jackson Street, St. Paul, MN
- Nicollet County Courthouse and Jail, 501 S, Minnesota Ave., St. Peter, MN
- Nicollet House Hotel, Minnesota Ave. at Park Row, St. Peter, MN
- Old Main at Gustavus Adolphus College, Gustavus Adolphus College campus, St. Peter, MN
- Rochat-Louise-Sauerwein Block, 261–277 W. 7th St., St. Paul, MN
- SS Peter and Paul Catholic Church 1871, 4th and Mulberry, Mankato, MN
- Building(s) in St. Peter Commercial Historic District, Minnesota Ave. between Broadway and Grace Streets, St. Peter, MN
- Walsh Building, 189-191 E. 7th St., St. Paul, MN

Other buildings

- Cathedral of St. Mary, North Broadway and 6th Avenue North, Fargo, North Dakota
- Saint Michael Church, Stillwater, Minnesota
