= Emma Brunson =

American architect (1887–1980)

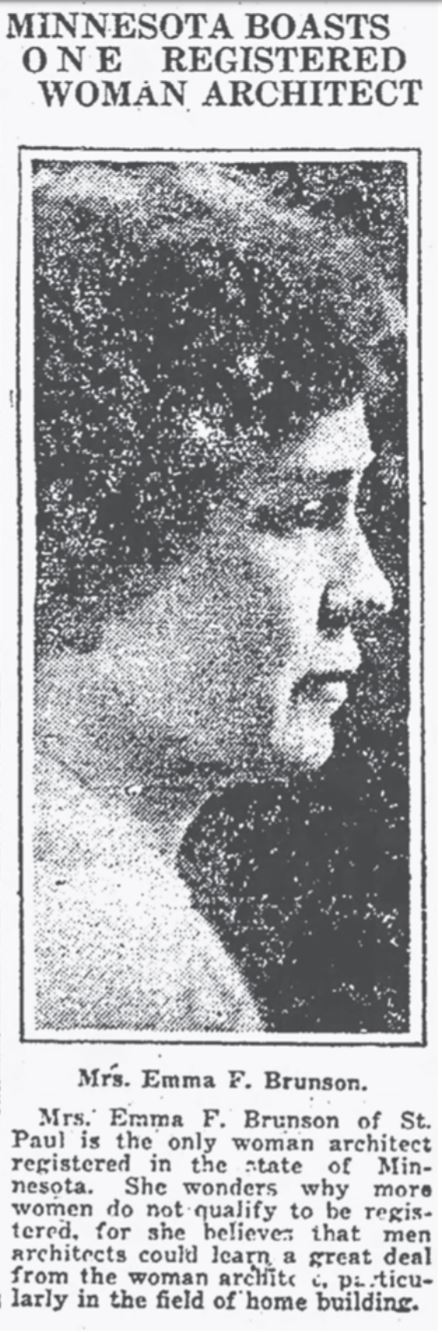
- Oshkosh Daily Northwestern Feb 1, 1923
- Born: Emma Gruetzke; 1887
- Died: 1980 (aged 92–93); St. Paul, Minnesota
- Occupation: Architect

Emma (née Gruetzke) Brunson (1887–1980) was an American architect and the state of Minnesota's first registered woman architect.

== Life and work ==
Brunson was probably born in St. Paul, Minnesota. Nothing is known of her education and training, however, she worked as a drafter and specifications writer for Augustus F. Gauger for 15 years before she opened her own firm in 1920. She became Minnesota's First registered woman architect on December 23, 1921, soon after the enactment of the Minnesota law requiring registration for architects and engineers. She did primarily residential work until her retirement in 1968. Brunson died in St. Paul, Minnesota in 1980.

== Projects ==
Some of her buildings are:

- Hugo Koch residence, Osceola Avenue between Albert and Hamline Avenues, Saint Paul, Minnesota (1923)
- Emma Brunson residence, Maryland Street between Arcade and Mendota Streets, Saint Paul
- Theodore Maier residence, 616 Gotzian, St. Paul (1926)
- C.E. Smith residence, 673 Nebraska Avenue, St. Paul (1926)
- George E & Anne N Olson House, 203 Montrose Pl, St. Paul (1936)

== Legacy ==
Her papers are held in the Northwest Architectural Archives at the University of Minnesota.
