= Lyman Dayton =

American land developer and railroad promoter (1810–1865)

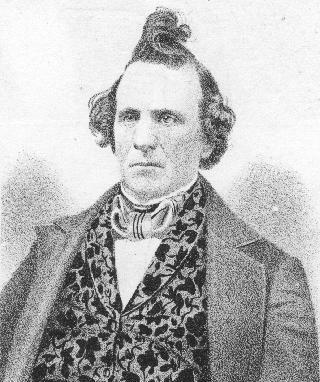
- Lyman Dayton
- Born: August 25, 1810; Southington, Connecticut, U.S.
- Died: October 20, 1865 (aged 55); Saint Paul, Minnesota, U.S.
- Occupations: Land developer, railroad promoter

Lyman Dayton (August 25, 1810 – October 20, 1865) was an American land developer, investor, and railroad promoter associated with the early development of Saint Paul, Minnesota. He is best known for platting land that became the neighborhood of Dayton's Bluff and for his involvement in early railroad projects connecting the Twin Cities to Lake Superior. The city of Dayton, Minnesota is named in his honor.

== Early life ==
Dayton was born on August 25, 1810, in Southington, Connecticut. In January 1831, he married Maria Bates in Rhode Island.

Little documentation exists regarding Dayton's early career prior to his arrival in the Minnesota Territory. Like many early settlers of the region, he became involved in land speculation and development during the rapid expansion of Saint Paul in the mid-19th century.

== Move to Minnesota ==
Dayton moved to Saint Paul, Minnesota, in 1849, the same year Minnesota Territory was established. That year he acquired a one-third interest in land from Henry Mower Rice, an influential territorial politician and businessman.

This land later became part of the development known as Dayton and Irvine's Addition to Saint Paul, reflecting the city's early suburban expansion beyond its original riverfront settlement.

Dayton and his wife built a home in Saint Paul around 1854.

== Real estate development ==
Dayton became one of the most prominent land investors in early Saint Paul. By the mid-1850s he had acquired large tracts of land east of the city's downtown area.

In 1857 he platted an extensive residential subdivision known as Dayton's Addition on the bluffs east of the city. The area later became known as Dayton's Bluff, a historic neighborhood overlooking the Mississippi River.

Dayton reportedly owned approximately 5,000 acres of land in the region during this period.

Several locations in Saint Paul are named for Dayton or his family, including:

- Dayton's Bluff
- Dayton Avenue
- Maria Avenue (named after his wife Maria Bates Dayton)
- Bates Avenue

== Railroad ventures ==
Dayton was an early promoter of rail transportation in Minnesota. He was associated with the chartering of the Nebraska and Lake Superior Railroad Company in 1857, a precursor to the Lake Superior and Mississippi Railroad.

Dayton invested personal funds—reported to be about $10,000—to support the surveying and early development of the line. He served as president of the railroad during its early organizational period.

The project later evolved into the Lake Superior and Mississippi Railroad, which ultimately created the first rail connection between the Twin Cities and Duluth, Minnesota. The line was completed after Dayton's death.

== Legacy ==
Dayton died on October 20, 1865, in Saint Paul, Minnesota.

He is remembered primarily for his influence on the development of Saint Paul's east side and for his role in early railroad promotion in Minnesota.

The following places are named after him:

- Dayton's Bluff
- Dayton Avenue in Saint Paul
- Dayton, Minnesota

He is buried at Oakland Cemetery in Saint Paul.

== See also ==
- History of Saint Paul, Minnesota
- Dayton's Bluff, Saint Paul
- Lake Superior and Mississippi Railroad
