= Jimmy Brown (musician) =

American trumpeter, saxophonist and singer

- Birth name: James Earl Brown
- Also known as: Jimmy Earle; Jumpin' Jimmy Brown; Rio Pardo
- Born: August 8, 1926; Great Bend, Kansas, United States
- Died: December 18, 2006 (aged 80); Maple Grove, Minnesota, United States
- Genres: Rhythm and blues
- Occupation: Musician
- Instrument(s): Trumpet, vocals, saxophone
- Years active: 1945–2006

James Earl Brown (August 8, 1926 – December 18, 2006) was an American trumpeter, saxophonist and singer. He was also credited or billed as Jimmy Earle, Jumpin' Jimmy Brown, and Rio Pardo.

== Biography ==
He was born in Great Bend, Kansas, and learned piano before being drawn to other instruments, particularly the trumpet. After graduating, he went into the US Navy during World War II, serving in the Mediterranean. On returning to the US, he played in bands in Norfolk, Virginia, where he met and married R&B singer Ruth Alston Weston, known for the rest of her career as Ruth Brown. They performed as a duo, Brown & Brown, and recorded for Atlantic Records where he was credited as Jimmy Earle.

After their marriage was annulled, Jimmy Brown moved to New York City, where he played in clubs in Harlem. In the 1950s he played trumpet and sang with Paul Williams and his Hucklebuckers, and played in the house band at the Apollo Theater. He became known as Jumpin' Jimmy Brown, for his habit of jumping from the stage into the audience with his trumpet. Later he worked with Etta James, Nat King Cole, was music director for Debbie Reynolds, and played lead trumpet with the Count Basie Orchestra.

He moved to Minnesota in the 1960s, performing in the Twin Cities (Minneapolis-St. Paul), and relocated to a farm near Duluth in 1968. In Duluth, he took the stage name Rio Pardo, saying "I always liked the Latin beat and I saw the name Pardo in a book". He led a band playing in clubs and then at the Hotel Duluth. He moved back to the Twin Cities in the 1990s, and played occasionally with a local band, the Senders, until shortly before his death.

He died in Maple Grove, Minnesota, in 2006, aged 80, from an infection.
