= Arbor Lakes =

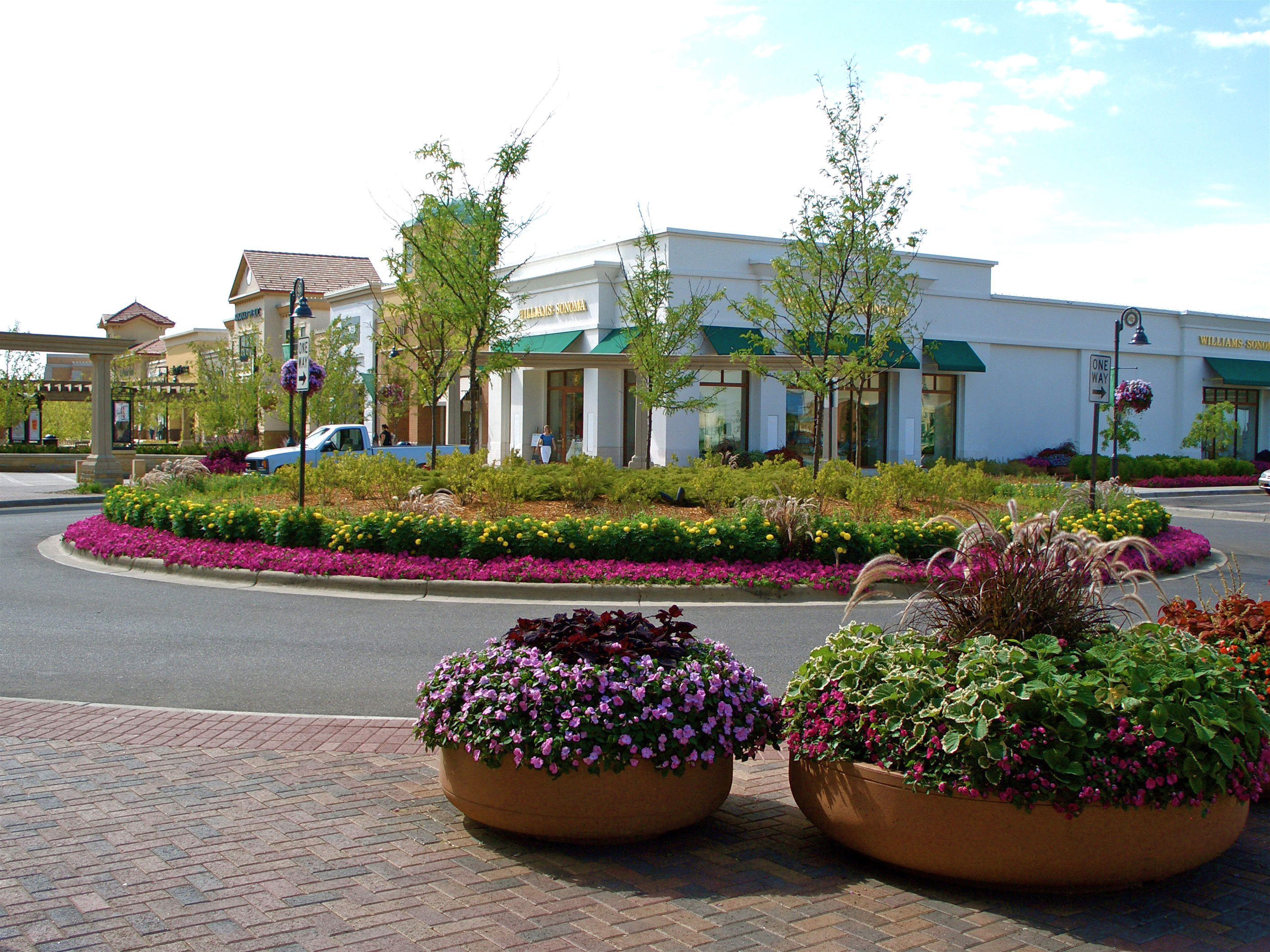
- Arbor Lakes
- Location: Maple Grove, Minnesota, United States
- Coordinates: 45.0925°N 93.4348°W
- Opened: 1st Phase - 1997; 2nd Phase - 2003; 3rd Phase - 2007; 4th Phase - 2016
- Num. of stores: 260+
- Num. of anchor tenants: 10
- Floors: 1
- Parking: Surface parking
- Public transit: Maple Grove Transit; Jefferson Lines

Arbor Lakes is a commercial and residential district located in downtown Maple Grove, Minnesota, United States. Construction of Arbor Lakes began in the late 1990s with a simulacrum of a traditional American Main Street designed in neotraditional style. The second phase (completed in 2003) included the Shoppes at Arbor Lakes, Minnesota's first lifestyle center, which includes neotraditional elements. The third phase, The Fountains at Arbor Lakes, is approximately 850,000 square feet (79,000 m^{2}) in size and includes a Main Street-inspired entrance, with two hotels, several restaurants, and a number of junior anchors. The fourth phase, The Village at Arbor Lakes, which will be 295,470 square feet (27,450 m^{2}) when completed, will include a Home2 Suites by Hilton hotel, a SpringHill Suites hotel, up to 700 apartments, and some retail.

== History ==
The land now occupied by the Arbor Lakes district was formerly an active gravel mine owned primarily by C.S. McCrossan and Tiller Corporation. The City of Maple Grove first began planning for a civic center in the late 1980s, as identified in former comprehensive land use plans.

A special gravel mining area (GMA) report was conducted in the 1990s to analyze the socio-economic feasibility of such a project. Construction on Arbor Lakes began in 1997 with the Main Street district.

The gravel mines east of Arbor Lakes are still active. In sum, the inactive and active gravel mines total nearly 2,000 acres (8.1 km^{2}), making the Arbor Lakes area the largest undeveloped urban infill site in the Twin Cities metropolitan area.

== Residential ==
Land located in the northern part of Arbor Lakes, which was once land for a master-planned community named HighGrove, built by now defunct Rottlund Homes. The remaining land will be developed by Mattamy Homes, a Canadian building company who renamed the neighborhood, HighGrove at Arbor Lakes. A senior housing building titled, Arbor Lakes Senior Living, is adjacent to the HighGrove neighborhood.

== Residential neighborhoods ==
Neighborhood name	Opened	Builder	Location
Arbor Lakes Commons	2004	Unknown	Located south of The Bridges at Arbor Lakes
Arbor Lakes Senior Living	2011	Unknown	Located north of the Arbor Lakes Medical Building.
Arbor Lakes Senior Living Phase II	2014	Unknown	Located north of the Arbor Lakes Senior Living (Phase I)
Arbor Lakes Villas	2000	Unknown	Located east of Main Street at Arbor Lakes
Donegal at Arbor Lakes	2013	PulteGroup	Located east of Highgrove at Arbor Lakes.
HighGrove at Arbor Lakes	2008	Rottlund Homes and Mattamy Builders	Located north of Arbor Lakes Senior Living.
Just Off Main	2000	Unknown	Located west of Main Street at Arbor Lakes
The Bridges at Arbor Lakes	2006	Ron Clark Construction	Located north of Arbor Lakes Commons

== Features ==
=== Main Street ===
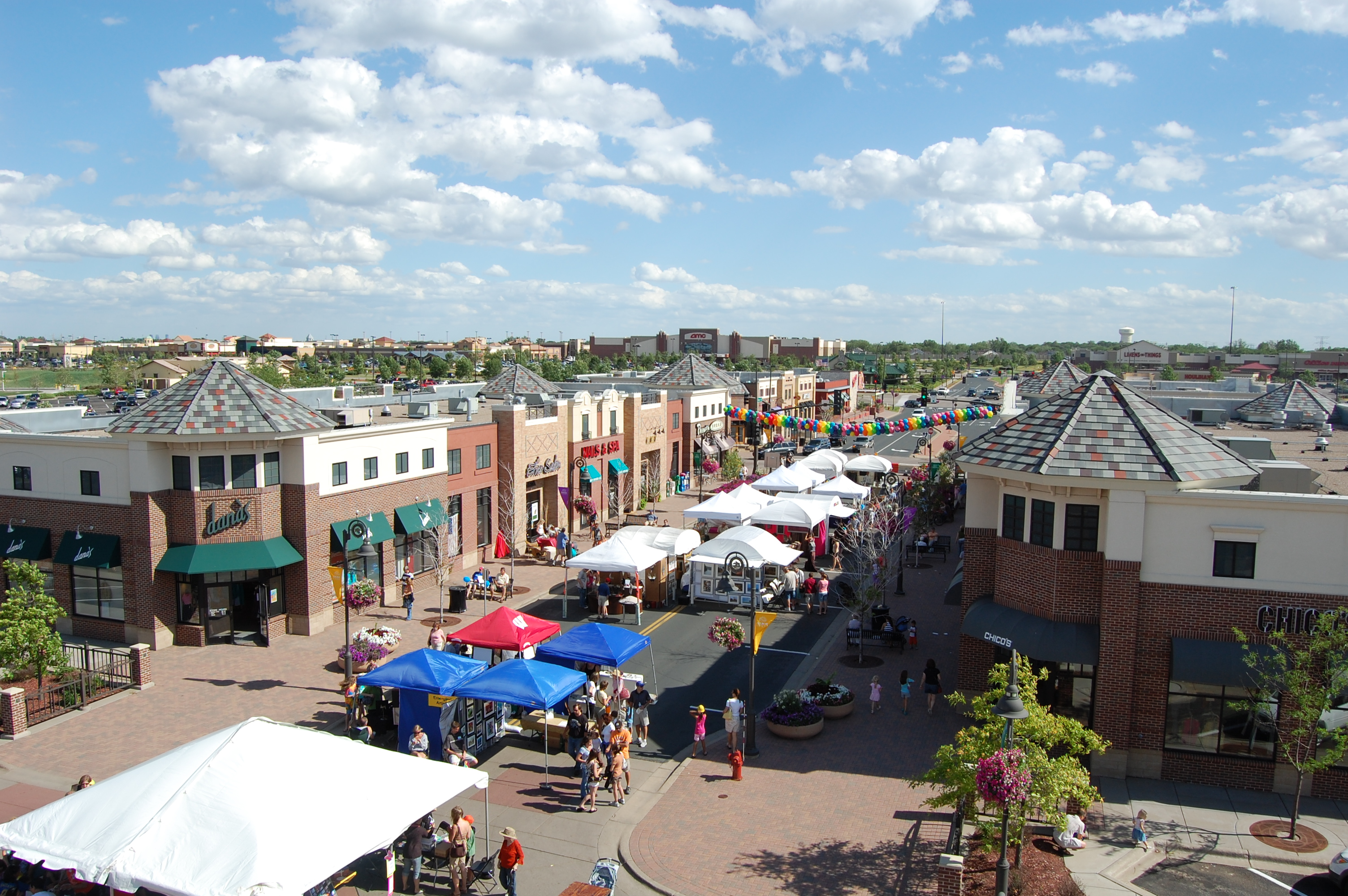
Main Street in Maple Grove, Minnesota

Main Street and its accompanying anchors represent the inceptive phase of Arbor Lakes, beginning in 1997. Largely unchartered in suburban environments, city planners worked closely with developers to pioneer a relatively dense, urban commercial and residential district in the geographic heart of the city. Main Street runs north–south near the west end of the Arbor Lakes district, intersecting Elm Creek Boulevard at the south and Weaver Lake Road at the north.

Unlike more traditional, historic "main streets" (which grew little by little over the course of several decades), Maple Grove's Main Street was built over an approximate five-year time span, from 1997 to 2001.

The Main Street district is directly adjacent to the Great River Energy headquarters, which is located just east of Main Street. Great River Energy relocated its headquarters from Elk River to Maple Grove in 2008, constructing what became Minnesota's first Platinum LEED building. The facility incorporates many "green" technologies such as a 250-foot (76 m) wind turbine, photovoltaic cells, rain gardens, rainwater re-use, green/recycled building materials, and so on.

North of Main Street is Maple Grove's public library.

=== The Shoppes at Arbor Lakes ===
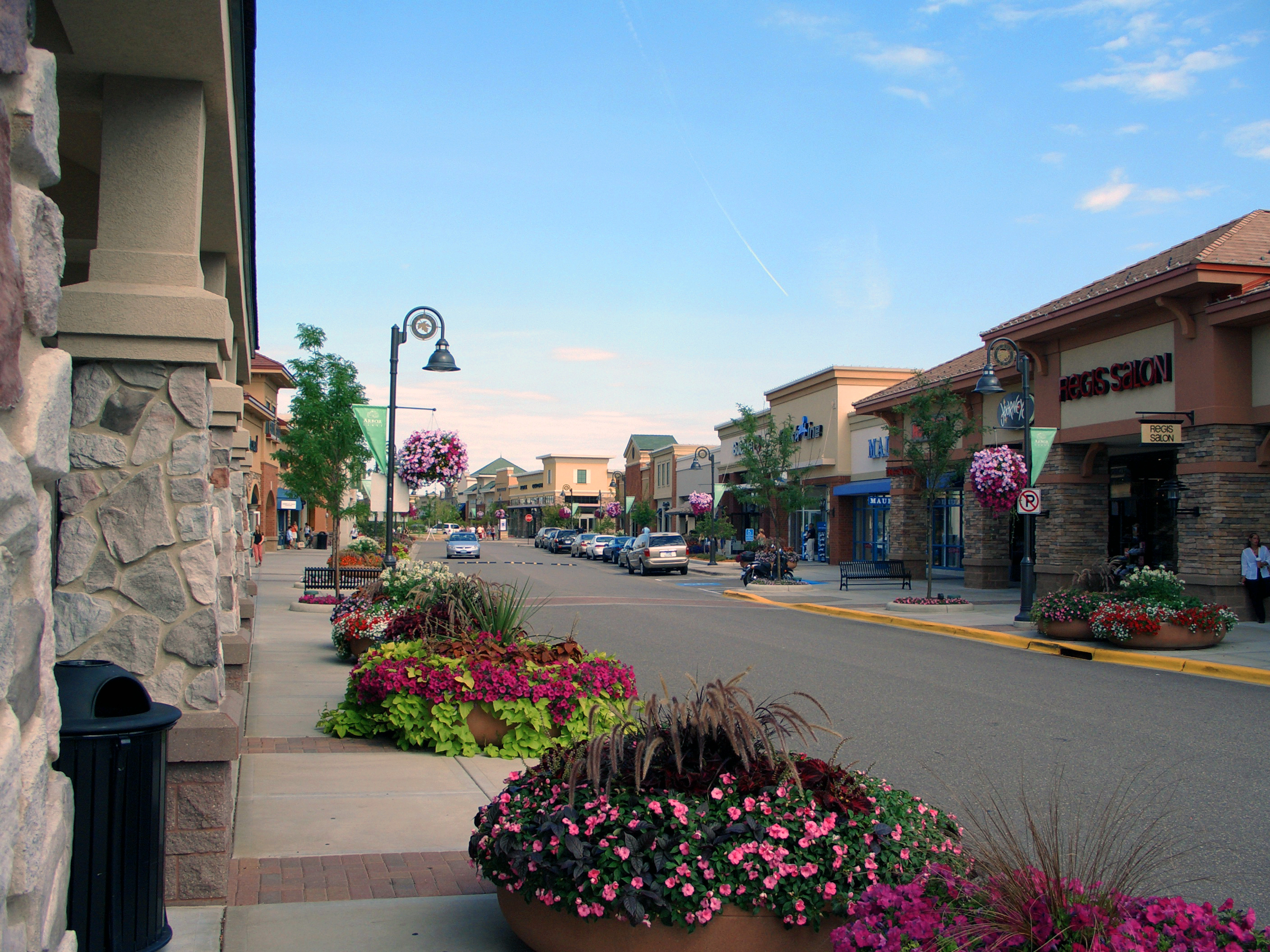
The Shoppes at Arbor Lakes, Maple Grove, Minnesota

The Shoppes at Arbor Lakes is a 412,000-square-foot (38,300 m^{2}) lifestyle center located at the intersection of Hemlock Lane and Elm Creek Boulevard in Maple Grove, Minnesota. The mall was designed by KKE Architects of Minneapolis and developed by Opus Northwest in collaboration with Red Development. The center opened September 12, 2003. The Shoppes are designed to have the look and feel of a traditional Main Street. Unlike a regional mall, which would have anchor tenants (generally department stores such as Macy's or Nordstrom), the lifestyle center aims to have smaller, boutique-style stores.

In keeping with the lifestyle center tradition, the Shoppes at Arbor Lakes is made up of mainly upscale national chains. Local stores also have a presence at the Shoppes.

The primary target markets for lifestyle centers such as the Shoppes are affluent women and youth. These demographic groups also happen to have the most purchasing power in the United States of America.

In 2005, Opus and Red Development worked to open Woodbury Lakes in Woodbury, Minnesota, an eastern suburb that shares similar demographics with Maple Grove. In October 2009, Woodbury Lakes went into bankruptcy but remains open to the public.

=== The Fountains at Arbor Lakes ===
The Fountains at Arbor Lakes is a "hybrid power center" retail concept, approximately 850,000 square feet (79,000 m^{2}) in size (nearby Ridgedale, while an enclosed regional mall, contains approximately the same square footage). The shopping center also features at its main entrance a Main Street simulacrum, which is designed to inspire an urban, pedestrian-friendly coexistence with vehicular traffic.

The retail center has several small land parcels available for development, while the majority of the center is leased.

=== The Village at Arbor Lakes ===
As part of the most recent phase of the Arbor Lakes regional commercial center, The Village at Arbor Lakes will feature up to 700 apartment units among four high-density buildings, two hotels, one of them a 128-room SpringHill Suites Hotel, the other one a 108-room Home2 Suites room, and a pair of multi-tenant buildings. Plans for development in this area had been changing since 2007, with the first proposed development, the Reflections at Arbor Lakes, falling apart due to the Great Recession, and two other projects, one of them being called the Point at Arbor Lakes, being turned down in 2014. The Maple Grove City Council approved "The Village at Arbor Lakes" in April 2016, with construction starting two months later.
