= Arlon Lindner =

American politician (1935–2021)

Arlon Wayne Lindner

Member of the Minnesota House of Representatives from the 33A, 32A district
- In office 1993–2005
- Succeeded by: Joyce Peppin

Personal details
- Born: August 3, 1935 Beaumont, Texas, US
- Died: February 1, 2021 (aged 85) Rogers, Minnesota, US
- Party: Republican Party of Minnesota
- Education: North Texas State University, Central Baptist Theological Seminary of Minneapolis
- Occupation: businessman, politician

Arlon Wayne Lindner (August 3, 1935 – February 1, 2021) was a Minnesota politician and a former member of the Minnesota House of Representatives. He represented District 33A from 1993 to 2002 and District 32A from 2003 to 2005 (after the 2002 redistricting). The districts included portions of Hennepin and Wright counties.

== Early life, education, and career ==
Lindner was born in Beaumont, Texas. He graduated from North Texas State University with a bachelor's degree in economics. He also received a Master of Divinity in ethics from the Central Baptist Theological Seminary of Minneapolis. Lindner served in the United States Naval Air Reserves. He was a self-employed businessman and a Baptist.

== Minnesota House of Representatives ==
=== Elections ===
Lindner was first elected in 1992 and reelected in 1994, 1996, 1998, 2000, and 2002. In 2004 Joyce Peppin successfully challenged Lindner for the Republican endorsement. He then ran as an Independent, finishing third in the general election behind winner Peppin and Democrat Caroll Holmstrom.

2004 Minnesota State Representative- House 32A
Party	Candidate	Votes	%	±%
Democratic (DFL)	Caroll Holmstrom	7122	26.82	
Republican	Joyce Peppin	14273	53.82	
Independence	Arlon Lindner	5114	19.28	

=== Committee assignments ===
For the 78th Legislative Session (1993–95), Lindner served on the Commerce and Economic Development Committee, Consumer Protection Subcommittee, Real Estate and Commerce Subcommittee, Tourism and Small Business Division Subcommittee, Health and Human Services Committee, Health and Housing Finance Division Subcommittee, and Regulated Industries and Energy Committee. For the 79th Legislative Session (1995–97), Lindner served on the Environment and Natural Resources Committee, Health and Human Services Committee, Health and Human Services Finance Division Subcommittee, and Housing Committee. For the 80th Legislative Session (1997–99), Lindner served on the Capital Investment Committee, Education Subcommittee, Family and Early Childhood Education Finance Division, and Health and Human Services Committee. For the 81st Legislative Session (1999–2001), Lindner served on the Capital Investment Committee, Jobs and Economic Development Finance Committee, and was Chair of the Jobs and Economic Development Policy Committee. For the 82nd Legislative Session (2001–03), Lindner served on the Civil Law Committee, Jobs and Economic Development Finance Committee, the Commerce, Jobs, and Economic Development Committee, and was Chair of the Economic Development and Tourism Division Subcommittee. For the 83rd Legislative Session (2003–05), Lindner served on the Taxes Committee, Jobs and Economic Development Finance Committee, the Commerce, Jobs, and Economic Development Committee, and was Chair of the Economic Development and Tourism Division Subcommittee.

=== Ethics complaint ===
In 2003, Keith Ellison and a group of fellow DFLers of the Minnesota House of Representatives filed an ethics complaint against Lindner for a speech he made denying that homosexuals were targeted by the Nazis and slain in the Holocaust. He made several comments on the floor of the House while he introduced a bill that would "repeal the state's pro-gay human rights amendment and remove sexual orientation from its hate-crimes law." This led to Lindner being denied the Republican endorsement in the 2004 elections. He ran as an independent and lost the election with 19.3% of the vote.

== Personal life ==
Lindner moved to Corcoran, Minnesota, around 1987. He was married with four children. He lost parts of two fingers in a work-related accident at Schweigert Foods Company. Lindner died on February 1, 2021, in Rogers, Minnesota.
