= Dayton, Minnesota =

City in Minnesota, United States

- City
- Logo

- Location of the city of Dayton within Hennepin County, Minnesota
- Coordinates: 45°14′38″N 93°30′54″W
- Country: United States
- State: Minnesota
- Counties: Hennepin, Wright
- Settled: 1851
- Platted: 1855
- Named for: Lyman Dayton

Government
  - Mayor: Dennis Fisher
  - Council members: Travis Henderson; Scott Salonek; David Fashant; Matt Trost

Area
  - Total: 25.182 sq mi (65.221 km^{2})
  - Land: 23.419 sq mi (60.655 km^{2})
  - Water: 1.763 sq mi (4.565 km^{2})
- Elevation: 879 ft (268 m)

Population (2020)
  - Total: 7,262
  - Estimate (2025): 11,402
  - Density: 434/sq mi (167.5/km^{2})
- Time zone: UTC–6 (Central)
  - Summer (DST): UTC–5 (CDT)
- ZIP Code: 55327
- Area code: 763
- FIPS code: 27-15022
- GNIS feature ID: 0642665
- Sales tax: 8.525%
- Website: www.daytonmn.gov

Dayton is a city in Hennepin and Wright counties in the U.S. state of Minnesota. The population was 7,262 at the 2020 census. According to 2025 census estimates, the city is estimated to have a population of 11,402. Dayton is mainly located within Hennepin County, but a part of the city extends into Wright County as well. It is the northernmost city in Hennepin County and is a suburb of the Minneapolis–St. Paul "Twin Cities" metropolitan area.

The city of Dayton, platted in 1855, is named for city founder, Lyman Dayton. Through his energy and finances, Lyman Dayton was instrumental in bringing the railroad into Minnesota and development of the Lake Superior and Mississippi Railroad, of which he was president until 1865. The line is now part of the Burlington Northern Santa Fe Railroad.

== Geography ==
According to the United States Census Bureau, the city has a total area of 25.182 square miles (65.22 km^{2}), of which 23.419 square miles (60.65 km^{2}) is land and 1.763 square miles (4.57 km^{2}) is water. On January 15, 2003, the city's most recent geographical expanse extended its boundaries.

Fernbrook Lane (County 121); North Diamond Lake Road (County 144); South Diamond Lake Road; and Dayton River Road (County 12) are four of the main routes in Dayton. Interstate 94 and County Road 81 pass briefly through the southwest corner of Dayton. Brockton Lane (County 13) runs north-south along Dayton's western boundary line with adjacent city of Rogers.

The neighboring cities are Champlin, Rogers, Maple Grove, Anoka, Ramsey, Elk River, and Otsego. Corcoran is nearby, but does not border Dayton.

Dayton is located at the confluence of the Mississippi and Crow Rivers.

== Economy ==
Dayton is a small town in regard to the economy scale with few retail outlets. Dayton's economy comes from mostly small business operations such as its golf course, various car repair shops, famous local manor, and custom home builders. Its one mall, Raintree Plaza, has Marathon gas station and convenience store as well as several other small businesses.

== City government ==
In 2011, the city was forced to lay off several staff members and reduce services due to budget cuts.

The current mayor of Dayton is Dennis Fisher, veteran and family man.

The Dayton city council currently consists of the mayor - Dennis Fisher, 3 council members - Scott Salonek, Sara Van Asten, David Fashant, and a vacant seat. Council terms are 4 years and mayor term is 2 years.

== Demographics ==
Historical population
Census	Pop.	Note	%±
1880	255		—
1910	343		—
1920	299		−12.8%
1930	265		−11.4%
1940	253		−4.5%
1950	363		43.5%
1960	456		25.6%
1970	517		13.4%
1980	4,070		687.2%
1990	4,443		9.2%
2000	4,699		5.8%
2010	4,671		−0.6%
2020	7,262		55.5%
2025 (est.)	11,402		57.0%
U.S. Decennial Census; 2020 Census

Historical population
Census	Pop.	Note	%±
1860	540		—
1870	951		76.1%
1880	1,197		25.9%
1890	1,075		−10.2%
1900	1,138		5.9%
1910	778		−31.6%
1920	744		−4.4%
1930	718		−3.5%
1940	741		3.2%
1950	715		−3.5%
1960	804		12.4%
1970	2,162		168.9%
U.S. Census for Dayton Township

=== 2020 census ===
As of the 2020 census, there were 7,262 people, 2,458 households, and 2,035 families residing in the city. The population density was 310.1 inhabitants per square mile (119.7/km^{2}). There were 2,605 housing units, of which 5.6% were vacant. The homeowner vacancy rate was 3.0% and the rental vacancy rate was 3.2%.

The median age was 37.6 years. 27.1% of residents were under the age of 18 and 12.1% of residents were 65 years of age or older. For every 100 females there were 100.4 males, and for every 100 females age 18 and over there were 101.3 males age 18 and over.

68.1% of residents lived in urban areas, while 31.9% lived in rural areas.

Among households, 41.0% had children under the age of 18 living in them. Of all households, 69.2% were married-couple households, 10.8% were households with a male householder and no spouse or partner present, and 14.1% were households with a female householder and no spouse or partner present. About 13.1% of all households were made up of individuals and 4.8% had someone living alone who was 65 years of age or older.

Dayton, Minnesota – Racial Composition (NH = Non-Hispanic) Note: the US Census treats Hispanic/Latino as an ethnic category. This table excludes Latinos from the racial categories and assigns them to a separate category. Hispanics/Latinos can be of any race.
Race	Number	Percentage
White (NH)	5,759	79.3%
Black or African American (NH)	236	3.2%
Native American or Alaska Native (NH)	19	0.3%
Asian (NH)	214	2.9%
Pacific Islander (NH)	0	0.0%
Some Other Race (NH)	33	0.5%
Mixed/Multi-Racial (NH)	297	4.1%
Hispanic or Latino	704	9.7%
Total	7,262	100.0%

=== 2010 census ===
As of the 2010 census, there were 4,671 people, 1,638 households, and 1,319 families living in the city. The population density was 200.9 inhabitants per square mile (77.6/km^{2}). There were 1,699 housing units at an average density of 73.1 per square mile (28.2/km^{2}). The racial makeup of the city was 93.7% White, 0.5% African American, 0.2% Native American, 2.0% Asian, 0.1% Pacific Islander, 1.8% from other races, and 1.7% from two or more races. Hispanic or Latino of any race were 8.8% of the population.

There were 1,638 households, of which 35.5% had children under the age of 18 living with them, 66.8% were married couples living together, 7.4% had a female householder with no husband present, 6.3% had a male householder with no wife present, and 19.5% were non-families. 14.3% of all households were made up of individuals, and 4.2% had someone living alone who was 65 years of age or older. The average household size was 2.85 and the average family size was 3.12.

The median age in the city was 41.7 years. 24.6% of residents were under the age of 18; 8.2% were between the ages of 18 and 24; 22.5% were from 25 to 44; 35.7% were from 45 to 64; and 9% were 65 years of age or older. The gender makeup of the city was 52.2% male and 47.8% female.

=== 2000 census ===
As of the 2000 census, there were 4,699 people, 1,550 households, and 1,292 families living in the city. The population density was 200.4 inhabitants per square mile (77.4/km^{2}). There were 1,566 housing units at an average density of 66.8 inhabitants per square mile (25.8/km^{2}). The racial makeup of the city was 95.28% White, 0.64% African American, 0.64% Native American, 0.81% Asian, 1.87% from other races, and 0.77% from two or more races. Hispanic or Latino of any race were 2.75% of the population. 31.6% were of German, 13.5% Swedish, 11.0% Norwegian and 7.9% Irish ancestry.

There were 1,550 households, out of which 45.7% had children under the age of 18 living with them, 71.9% were married couples living together, 7.9% had a female householder with no husband present, and 16.6% were non-families. 11.7% of all households were made up of individuals, and 2.1% had someone living alone who was 65 years of age or older. The average household size was 3.03 and the average family size was 3.29.

In the city, the population was spread out, with 30.5% under the age of 18, 7.8% from 18 to 24, 33.2% from 25 to 44, 23.7% from 45 to 64, and 4.7% who were 65 years of age or older. The median age was 35 years. For every 100 females, there were 103.1 males. For every 100 females age 18 and over, there were 105.1 males.

The median income for a household in the city was $66,875, and the median income for a family was $71,356. Males had a median income of $41,476 versus $30,386 for females. The per capita income for the city was $27,756. About 1.0% of families and 2.7% of the population were below the poverty line, including 3.7% of those under age 18 and none of those age 65 or over.

== Politics ==
From 1960 to 1996, Dayton was a Democratic stronghold, having voted Democrat in every election except for 1984 when it voted narrowly for then-incumbent Ronald Reagan, who won in a landslide over Minnesota Senator Walter Mondale. Between 2000 and 2020, Dayton would reliably vote Republican. However, in 2024, partially due to its increase in suburban development, Dayton returned to its Democratic roots when Kamala Harris won the city in 2024.

Presidential election results

2020 Precinct Results Spreadsheet2016 Precinct Results Spreadsheet2012 Precinct Results Spreadsheet2008 Precinct Results Spreadsheet2004 Precinct Results Spreadsheet2000 Precinct Results Spreadsheet1996 Precinct Results1992 Precinct Results1988 Precinct Results1984 Precinct Results1980 Precinct Results1976 Precinct Results1968 Precinct Results1964 Precinct Results1960 Precinct Results
Year	Republican	Democratic	Third parties
2024	47.0% 3,123	50.7% 3,369	2.4% 156
2020	51.7% 2,369	45.4% 2,082	2.9% 133
2016	55.9% 1,643	34.9% 1,026	9.2% 272
2012	60.3% 1,667	37.0% 1,023	2.7% 74
2008	58.3% 1,601	39.8% 1,092	1.9% 53
2004	59.0% 1,628	39.6% 1,094	1.4% 39
2000	52.2% 1,309	40.6% 1,018	7.2% 179
1996	38.2% 825	45.7% 986	16.1% 347
1992	32.8% 772	34.4% 811	32.8% 773
1988	47.9% 945	52.1% 1,027	0.0% 0
1984	52.0% 976	48.0% 902	0.0% 0
1980	40.2% 700	51.2% 893	8.6% 150
1976	34.3% 552	64.2% 1,033	1.5% 24
1968	25.3% 45	73.0% 130	1.7% 3
1964	22.3% 37	77.7% 129	0.0% 0
1960	25.8% 48	74.2% 138	0.0% 0

== Points of interest ==
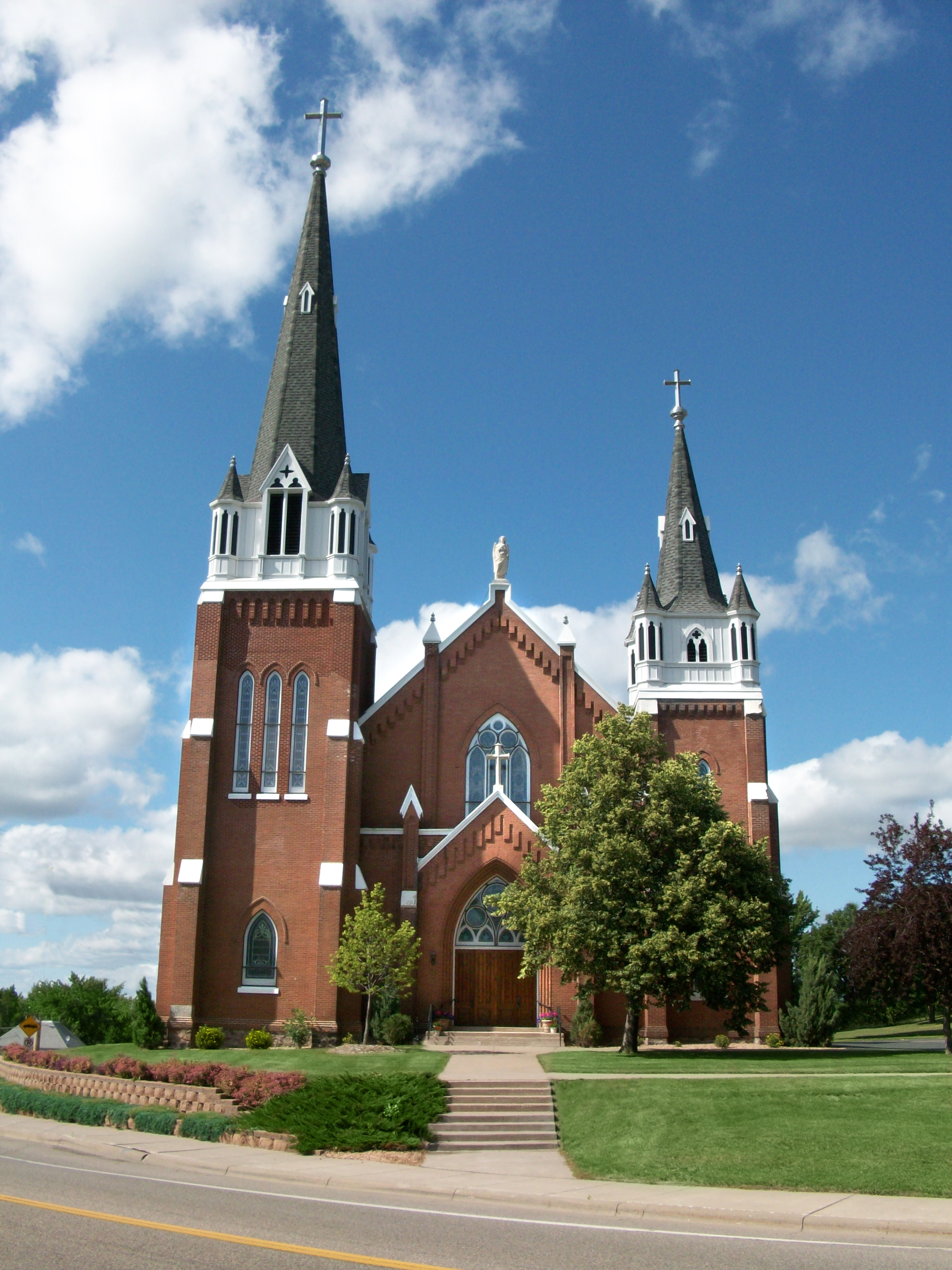
St. John The Baptist Catholic Church, July 2009

St. John the Baptist Catholic Church, constructed in 1904, can be seen for miles and from four different counties.

Elm Creek Park Reserve comprises one-third of Dayton.
