= Nicollet County Courthouse and Jail =

- U.S. National Register of Historic Places
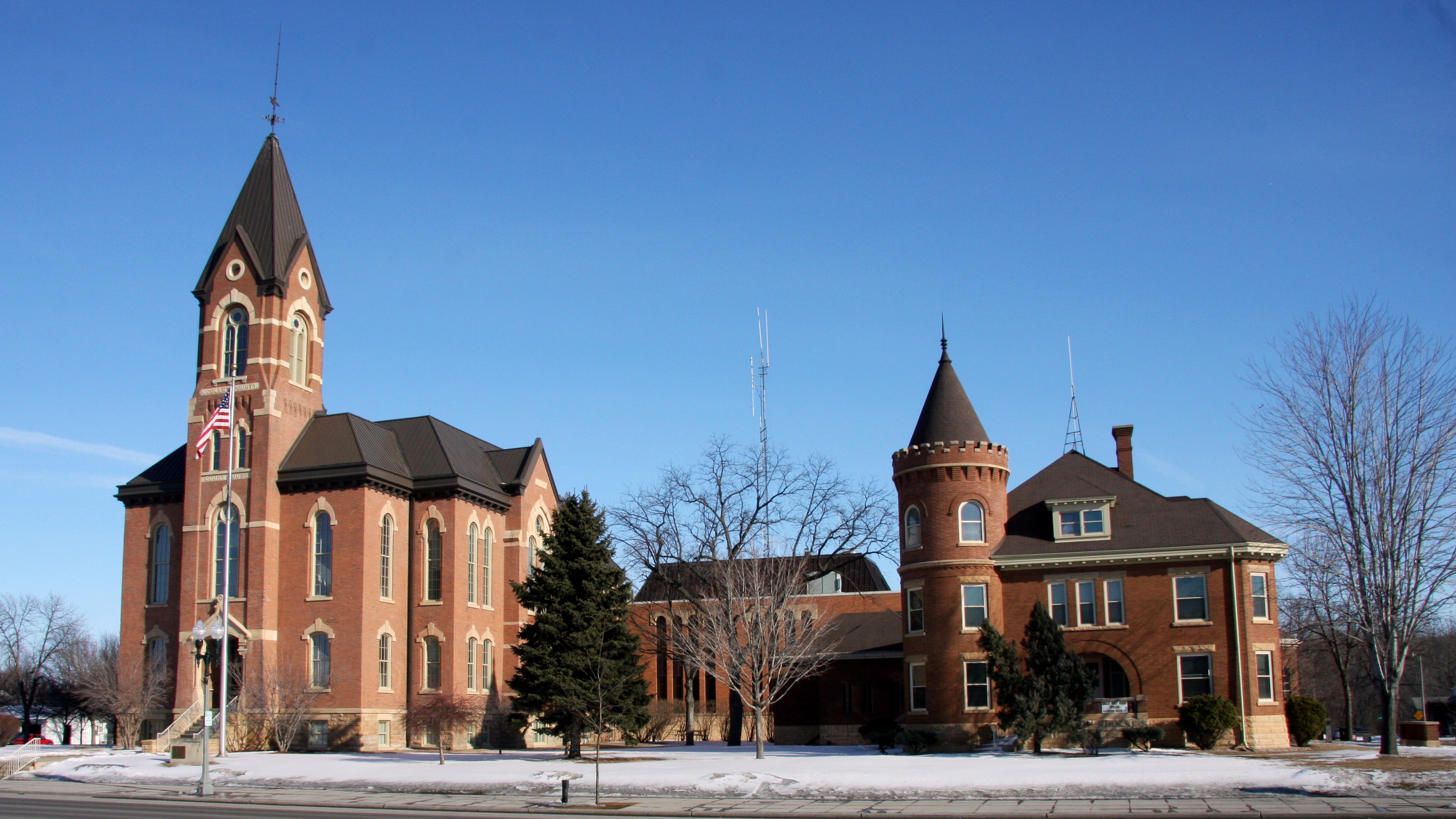
- Nicollet County Courthouse and Jail in 2013

- Location within Minnesota Location within the United States
- Location: 501 South Minnesota Avenue, St. Peter, Minnesota
- Coordinates: 44°19′18″N 93°57′28″W
- Area: 2.2 acres (0.89 ha)
- Built: 1880-1881
- Architect: Edward P. Bassford and E.W. Stebbins
- Architectural style: Romanesque, Queen Anne
- NRHP reference No.: 02000939
- Added to NRHP: September 06, 2002

The Nicollet County Courthouse and Jail are historic governmental buildings located at 501 South Minnesota Avenue in St. Peter, Minnesota, United States.

The courthouse was designed in a Romanesque Revival style of architecture by noted St. Paul architects Edward P. Bassford and E. W. Stebbins. Construction started and was completed in 1881 at a cost of $26,638. Bohn and Wilce of Winona were the builders. Minor extensions and additions were made in 1917 and 1967. In 1978 a $913,512 3-story addition designed by Wick-Kagermeier-Skaar of Mankato was built on the rear side of the building. A March 28, 1998 tornado damaged the building and after repairs it was reopened in June 2000. The next year a 3-year multimillion-dollar extension and renovation began. The building is now called the Nicollet County Government Center.

The jail was designed in a Queen Anne style of architecture by Winona architect Andrew J. Van Deusen. Construction was started in 1906 and completed in 1907 at an estimated cost of about $22,000.

On September 6, 2002, they were added to the National Register of Historic Places
