= Dale Clausnitzer =

American businessman and politician

Dale A. Clausnitzer (born December 3, 1951) is an American businessman and politician.

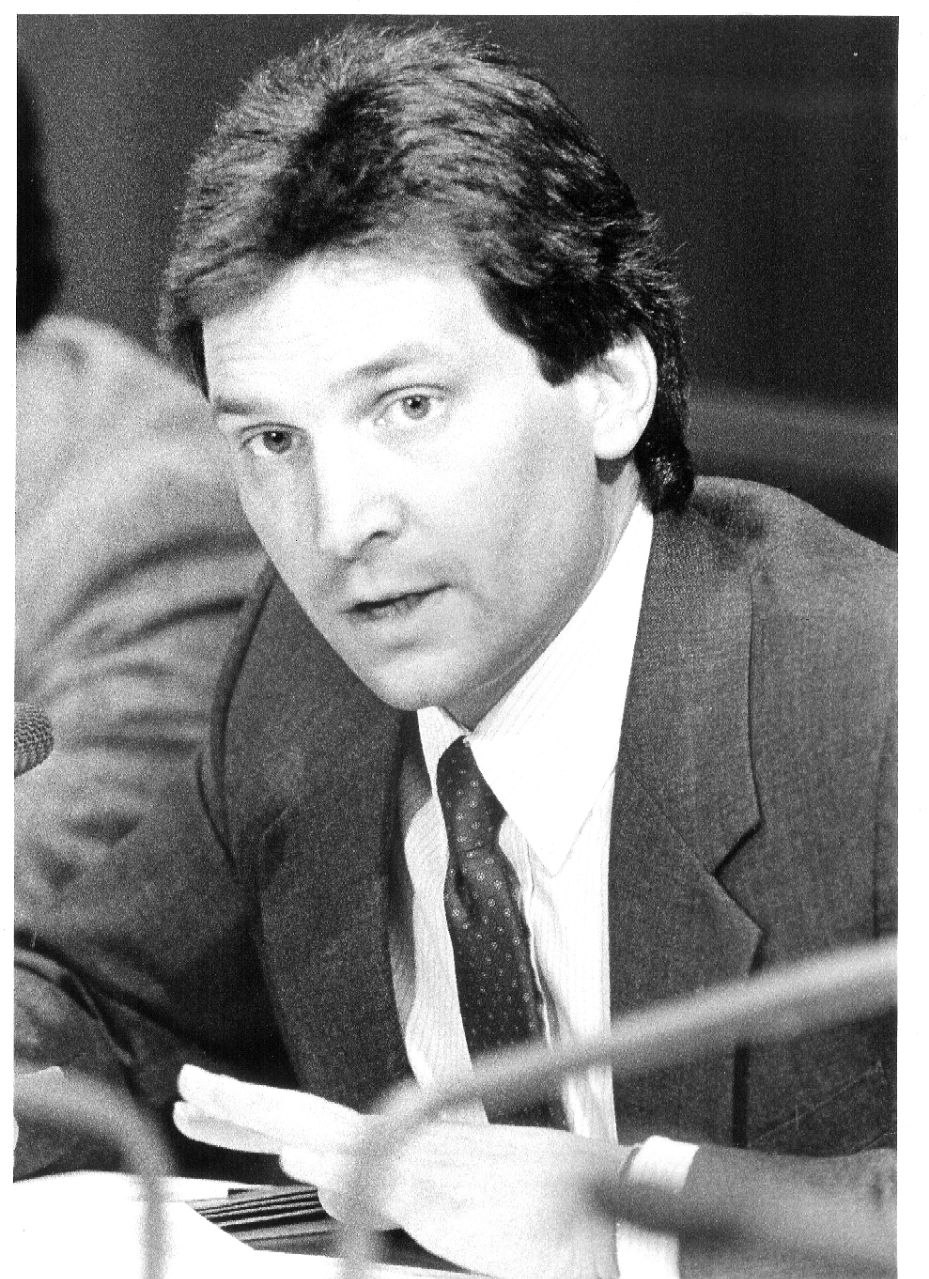

Clausnitzer was born in Bismarck, North Dakota. He went to North Hennepin Community College and University of Minnesota. Clausnitzer is an accountant and a business management consultant. He has previously lived in Maple Grove, Minnesota, San Diego, California and currently lives in Broomfield, Colorado. Clausnitzer served in the Minnesota House of Representatives, representing the Legislative District 38A including the Western Suburbs of Hennepin County from 1985 to 1988 and as a Republican. He has received multiple awards for his public service including 'One of Americas Outstanding Young Men' in 1985, "Champion of Small Business in 1985 and 1987, Selected to American Council of Young Political Leaders (ACYPL) in 1987 and received recognition and Awards for his voting record from Legislative Evaluation Assembly (LEA), a Non-Partisan, Non-profit Organization which bases its evaluation on American founding principles of self-evident truths and inalienable rights. These principles provide a basis for a constitutionally limited government established to sustain life, liberty, justice, property rights and free enterprise.
