= Augustus F. Gauger =

- Born: February 16, 1852; Germany
- Died: February 17, 1929 (aged 77); Saint Paul, Minnesota, U.S.
- Resting place: Oakland Cemetery
- Occupation: Architect
- Years active: 1875-1929

Augustus F. Gauger (February 16, 1852 – February 17, 1929) was a German-American architect. He was active in Saint Paul, Minnesota. He worked under Edward Bassford and later under his own firm designed a number of houses, schools, commercial buildings, and at least one church in Saint Paul.

== Biography ==
Gauger was born in Germany in 1852 and came to the United States in 1862 with his family. He lived on a farm near Oshkosh, Wisconsin, and worked as a carpenter. He moved to Saint Paul in 1875 after he trained in Chicago as an apprentice architectural draftsman.

== Career ==
In Saint Paul, Gauger worked as a draftsman under Edward Bassford before setting up his own practice in 1878.

Gauger's firm built many Minnesota buildings and courthouses in fourteen states. He built prominent homes such as the Theodore Hamm House (which is no longer extant), the Lindeke House and Constans Mansion on Summit Avenue, and homes on Como Lake. He also designed the Douglas, Franklin, Longfellow, and Rice schools in Saint Paul while serving as architect to the State Board of Education (1881–1887).

Gauger also served as a Saint Paul building inspector (1894–1895), on the committee revising the Saint Paul Building Code (1896, 1910–11), and as architect to the Board of Trustees of the Minnesota State Soldiers' Home (1905–1929), for which he designed the 1905 Women's Residence. Gauger helped to establish the Minnesota Chapter of the American Institute of Architects, served on the 1921 board to register Minnesota professionals in engineering and architecture, and was the second architect to be licensed in the state. Emma Brunson, the first woman registered as an architect in Minnesota, worked as a draftsman for Gauger's firm from 1905 to 1920, and he advocated for her state licensure.

== Personal life ==
Gauger married Albertine Nitshcke in 1878. Together they had seven sons. Their son Raymond succeeded his father in his architecture business.

Gauger died on February 16, 1929, and is buried in Saint Paul's Oakland Cemetery.

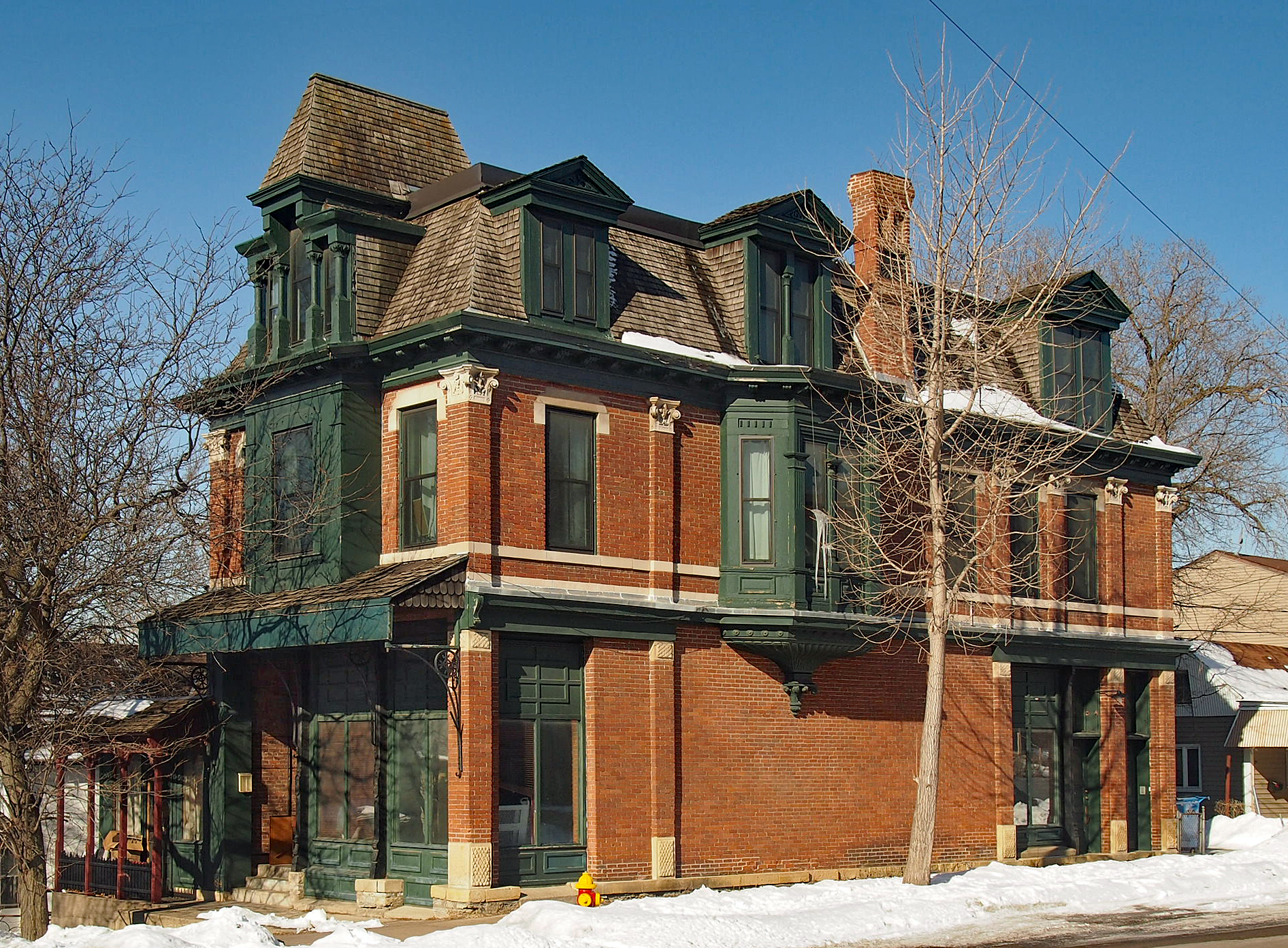
Schornstein Grocery and Saloon, a building designed by Gauger

== Notable works ==
- Exchange Bank Building, 344 3rd St., Farmington, Minnesota, 1880. Listed on the National Register of Historic Places.
- Cyrus and Mary Thurston House, 495 Summit Ave., Saint Paul, 1881
- Schornstein Grocery and Saloon, 707 Wilson Ave. E., Saint Paul, Minnesota, 1884. Listed on the National Register of Historic Places.
- Schoch Building, 374 Maria Ave., Saint Paul, 1885
- Stutzman Block, 721–733 E. 7th St., Saint Paul, 1885–1889
- Samuel Dearing House, 241 W. George St., Saint Paul, 1886
- Zion German Lutheran Church, 780 N. Cortland Pl., Saint Paul, 1888
- J.C. Carlson House, 640 Bremer Ave. S., Rush City, Minnesota, 1899. Listed on the National Register of Historic Places.
