= Schornstein Grocery and Saloon =

- U.S. National Register of Historic Places
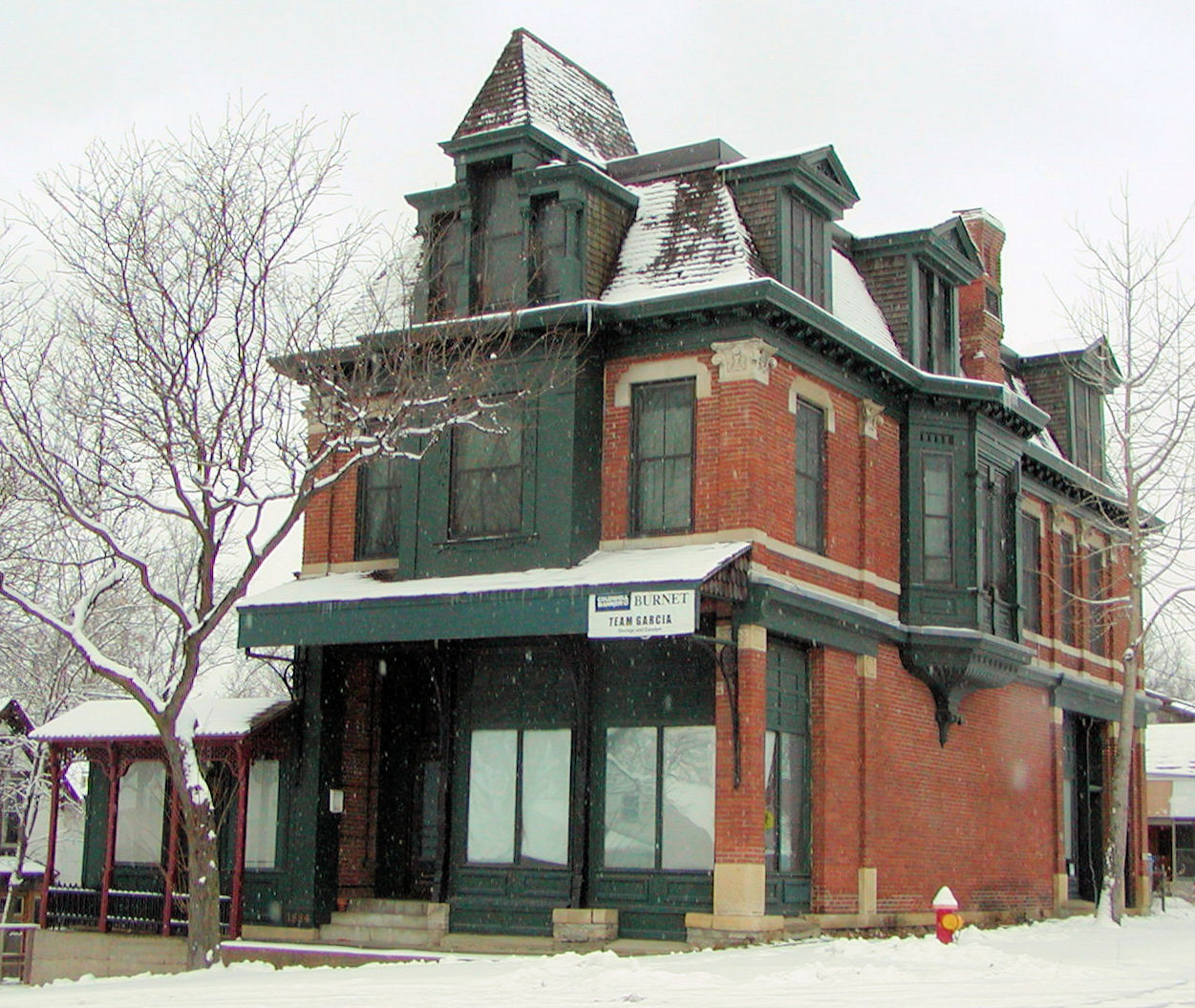

- Location within Minnesota Location within the United States
- Location: 707 Wilson Avenue East and 223 Bates Avenue North; Saint Paul, Minnesota
- Coordinates: 44°57′12″N 93°3′59″W
- Built: 1884
- Architect: Augustus F. Gauger
- Architectural style: Second Empire, Italianate
- NRHP reference No.: 84001681
- Added to NRHP: August 21, 1984

The Schornstein Grocery and Saloon is a commercial and residential building in Saint Paul, Minnesota, United States. It was built in 1884 for $5,000 in the French Second Empire style, and this Dayton's Bluff business was designed by architect Augustus F. Gauger (1852-1929). It is listed on the National Register of Historic Places.

== History ==
Schornstein Grocery and Saloon was built by William Schornstein, "a prominent member of the local German American community." Schornstein moved to the predominantly German area of Wilson/Bates on Dayton's Bluff in 1880, where he opened a grocery store and saloon in a rented space. In 1882, he built a two story brick store on the corner of Wilson and Bates Avenue but it was destroyed by fire two years later.

In 1884, Schornstein commissioned St. Paul architect Augustus F. Gauger to design the building for around $5,000. The new building housed a grocery store in the main storefront, a saloon at the rear, and Schornstein's apartment on the second floor. A meeting hall was on the third floor. The one-story storefront was used by Schornstein's brother-in-law as his harness shop, and the second-floor apartment was eventually divided into two. Schornstein's businesses were popular among the local German-American community.

William Schornstein operated the saloon and grocery store until 1910, when his son Otto took over. After Schornstein died, his son closed the store and sold the building.

== Architecture ==
Designed by Gauger, the building has an eclectic Victorian design combining French Second Empire and Italianate styles. The building is 25ft long and 58ft long and is 2.5 stories tall with a Mansard roof. The building has a limestone foundation, brick walls, and a cast iron pressed storefront topped by a shingled shed eave. It has a pyramidal and flat roofed dormer projecting from the Mansard roof.

A one-story wood frame storefront with a brick veneer was added to the building around 1889.
