= Merchants National Bank (Saint Paul) =

- U.S. National Register of Historic Places
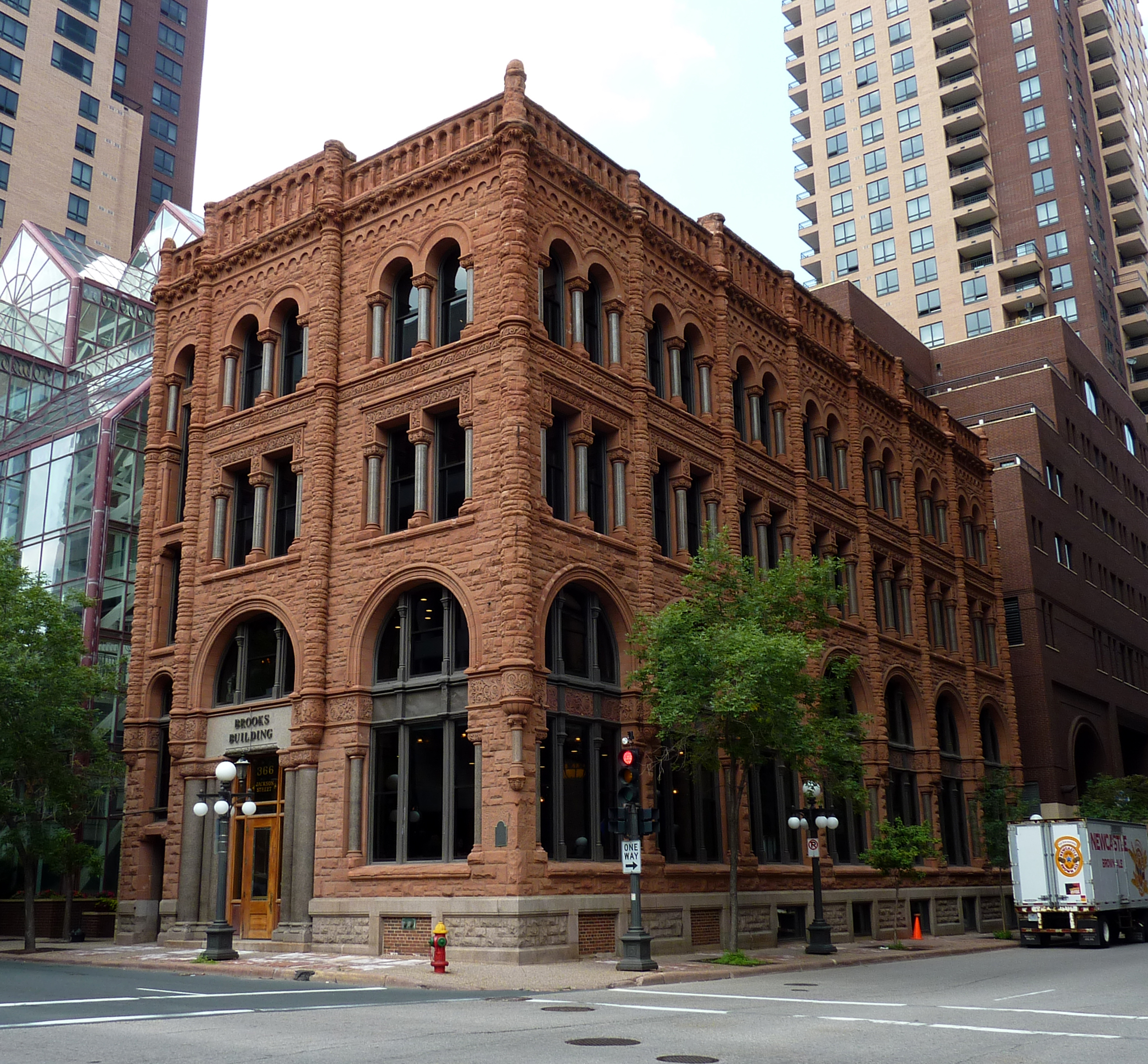

- Location within Minnesota Location within the United States
- Location: 366-368 Jackson Street; Saint Paul, Minnesota
- Coordinates: 44°56′53.83″N 93°5′21.78″W
- Built: 1892
- Architect: Edward Bassford
- Architectural style: Richardsonian Romanesque
- NRHP reference No.: 74001036
- Added to NRHP: December 19, 1974

The Merchants National Bank, McColl Building, or Brooks Building is a commercial building in Saint Paul, Minnesota, United States, built and opened in 1892 as a financial center in St. Paul's Lowertown neighborhood at the corner of Jackson Street and Fifth Street.

== Description ==
Merchants National Bank was built in 1892 and designed by Edward Bassford. The bank itself was incorporated in 1872 in the old St. Paul Press building. After seeing significant success, the bank built a new home, purchasing the land for $70,000 and constructing the building for $175,000.

With the bank on the lower floor, upper stories provided law offices. Several office tenants went on to great state or national prominence, including Cushman Kellogg Davis, Cordenio Severance, Frank B. Kellogg, Pierce Butler, and William D. Mitchell.

The building was threatened by demolition in 1967 with the goal of widening Jackson Street and Fifth Street. St. Paul City Council members decided to save the building.

The building is one of the last red stone buildings of its era in St. Paul, and the only remaining example of the Victorian office buildings on Jackson Street. It uses sandstone in a Richardsonian Romanesque style. It is listed on the National Register of Historic Places.

The four-story structure was carefully rehabilitated and restored by David A. Brooks, and the building now carries his family name.
