= Walsh Building =

- U.S. National Register of Historic Places
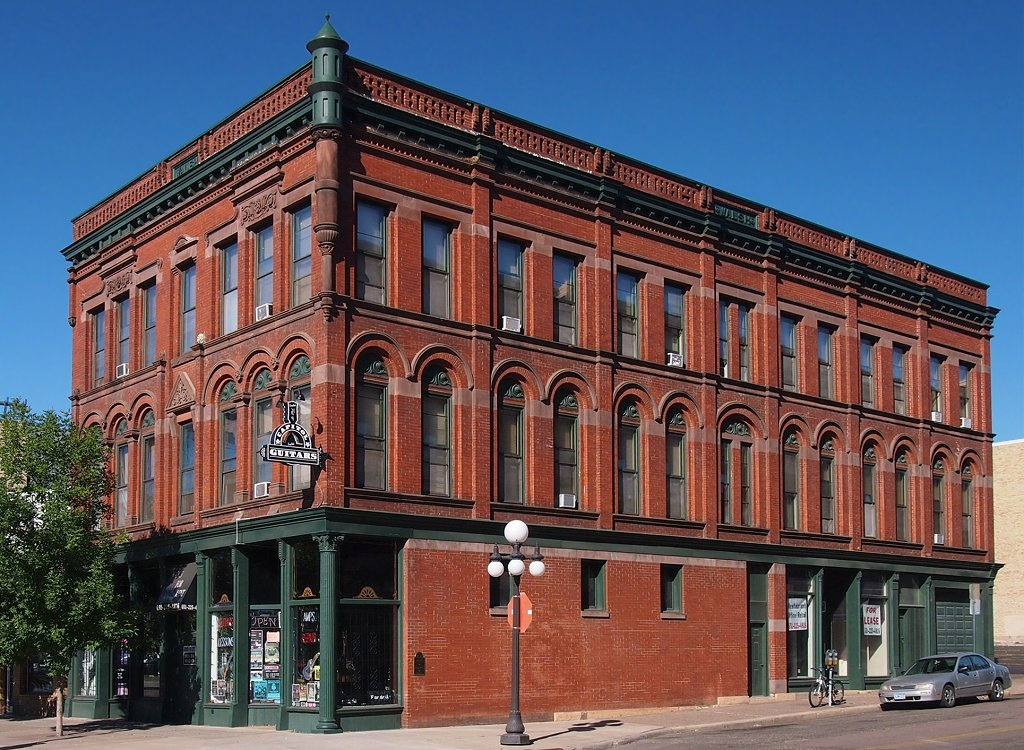
- The Walsh Building from the east

- Location within Minnesota Location within the United States
- Location: 189–191 7th Street East; Saint Paul, Minnesota
- Coordinates: 44°57′3″N 93°5′27″W
- Built: 1888
- Architect: Edward Bassford
- Architectural style: Renaissance, Romanesque
- NRHP reference No.: 89000444
- Added to NRHP: May 25, 1989

The Walsh Building in Saint Paul, Minnesota, United States, was designed by Edward Bassford in 1888. The Romanesque Revival building has been used as a residence, school, and manufacturing facility. It is listed on the National Register of Historic Places.
