= Kristin Robbins =

American politician (born 1968)

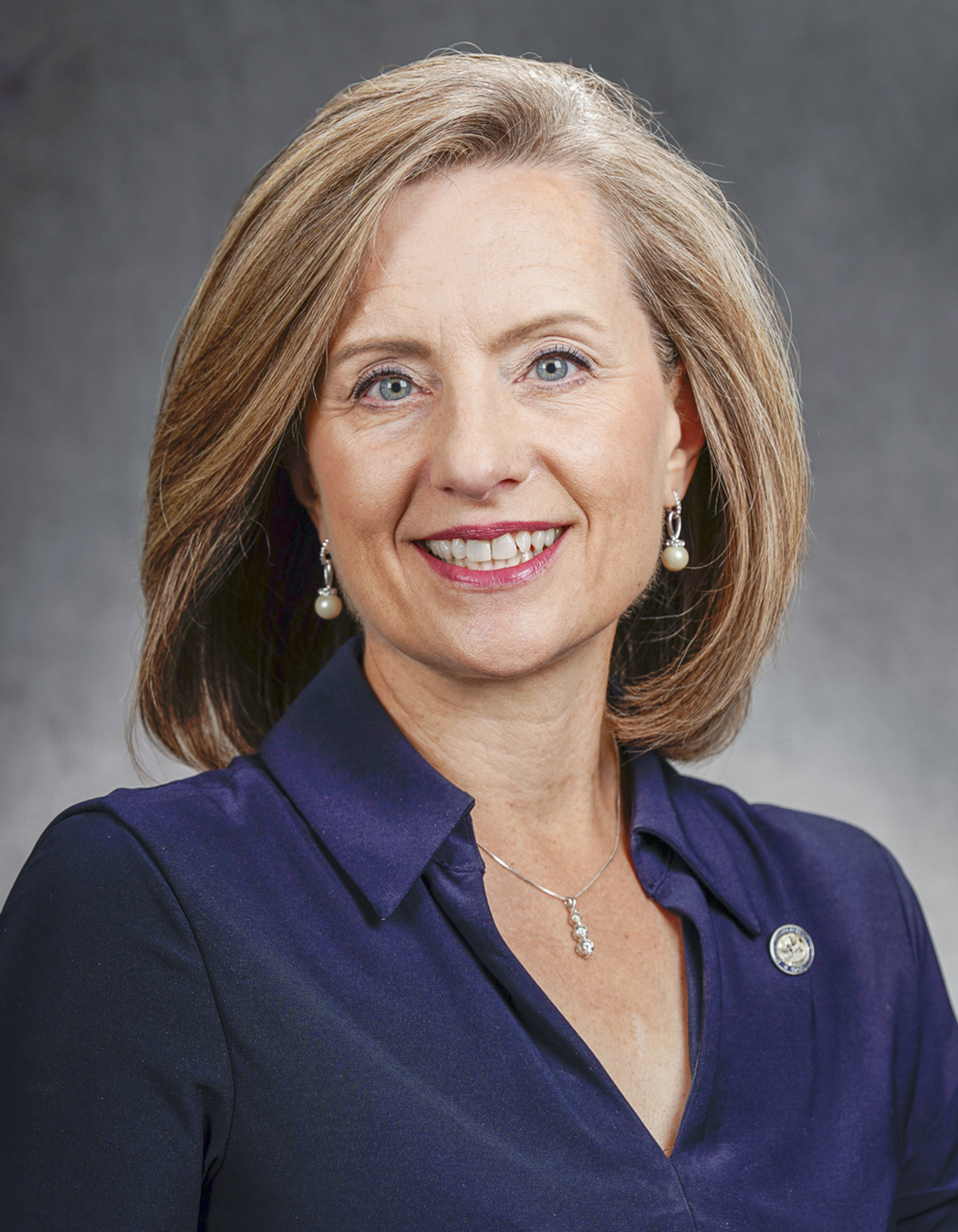
- Official portrait, 2022

Member of the Minnesota House of Representatives
- Incumbent
- Assumed office January 8, 2019
- Preceded by: Joyce Peppin
- Constituency: District 34A (2019–2023); District 37A (2023–present)

Personal details
- Born: April 29, 1968 (age 58)
- Party: Republican
- Spouse: Brent
- Children: 3
- Education: Bethel University (BA); Washington University in St. Louis (MA)

Kristin Jacobson Robbins (born April 29, 1968) is an American politician serving since 2019 in the Minnesota House of Representatives. A member of the Republican Party of Minnesota, Robbins represents District 37A in the northwestern Twin Cities metropolitan area, including the city of Maple Grove and parts of Hennepin County. She decided to launch a campaign for governor of Minnesota in 2026 instead of seeking re-election to the House, but withdrew her candidacy in May 2026.

== Early life and education ==
Robbins was born on April 29, 1968, and raised in Crookston, Minnesota. She attended Bethel University, graduating with a Bachelor of Arts in economics and political science, and Washington University in St. Louis, graduating with a Master of Arts in economics.

== Career ==
Robbins was formerly the legislative director for former U.S. Representative Harris Fawell and a deputy chair of the Senate District 34 Republicans. She was the executive director of the Economic Club of Minnesota.

Robbins was elected to the Minnesota House of Representatives in 2018, after incumbent Joyce Peppin retired, and has been reelected every two years since.

Robbins has served as an assistant minority leader since 2023. In 2025, she was selected as the Chair of the new Fraud Prevention and State Agency Oversight Policy Committee. For 2025–26, she sits on the Higher Education Finance and Policy, Taxes, and Ways and Means Committees.

== Electoral history ==
2018 Minnesota State House - District 34A
Party	Candidate	Votes	%
Republican	Kristin Robbins	12,486	56.49
Democratic (DFL)	Dan Solon	9,601	43.44
Write-in		15	0.07
Total votes		22,102	100.0
Republican hold			

2020 Minnesota State House - District 34A
Party	Candidate	Votes	%
Republican	Kristin Robbins (incumbent)	16,555	57.83
Democratic (DFL)	Brian Raines	12,056	42.11
Write-in		18	0.06
Total votes		28,629	100.0
Republican hold			

2022 Minnesota State House - District 37A
Party	Candidate	Votes	%
Republican	Kristin Robbins (incumbent)	12,637	56.11
Democratic (DFL)	Caitlin Cahill	9,872	43.83
Write-in		12	0.05
Total votes		22,521	100.0
Republican hold			

2024 Minnesota State House - District 37A
Party	Candidate	Votes	%
Republican	Kristin Robbins (incumbent)	15,817	57.12
Democratic (DFL)	Laurie Wolfe	11,851	42.80
Write-in		22	0.08
Total votes		27,690	100.0
Republican hold			
