= 2025 Minnesota Golden Gophers football team =

American college football season

2025 Minnesota Golden Gophers football

Rate Bowl champion

Rate Bowl, W 20–17 ^{OT} vs. New Mexico
- Conference: Big Ten Conference
- Record: 8–5 (5–4 Big Ten)
- Head coach: P. J. Fleck (9th season)
- Offensive coordinator: Greg Harbaugh Jr. (3rd season)
- Co-offensive coordinator: Matt Simon (6th season)
- Offensive scheme: Multiple
- Defensive coordinator: Danny Collins (1st season)
- Co-defensive coordinator: Nick Monroe (3rd season)
- Base defense: 4–2–5
- Home stadium: Huntington Bank Stadium

2025 Big Ten Conference football standings
	Conf.			Overall
Team	W		L	W		L
No. 1 Indiana y$#^	9	–	0	16	–	0
No. 5 Ohio State y^	9	–	0	12	–	2
No. 4 Oregon ^	8	–	1	13	–	2
No. 21 Michigan	7	–	2	9	–	4
No. 20 USC	7	–	2	9	–	4
No. 17 Iowa	6	–	3	9	–	4
Illinois	5	–	4	9	–	4
Washington	5	–	4	9	–	4
Minnesota	5	–	4	8	–	5
Nebraska	4	–	5	7	–	6
Northwestern	4	–	5	7	–	6
Penn State	3	–	6	7	–	6
UCLA	3	–	6	3	–	9
Rutgers	2	–	7	5	–	7
Wisconsin	2	–	7	4	–	8
Maryland	1	–	8	4	–	8
Michigan State	1	–	8	4	–	8
Purdue	0	–	9	2	–	10
Championship: Indiana 13, Ohio State 10
# – College Football Playoff champion; ^ – College Football Playoff participant; $ – Conference champion; y – Championship game participant; As of November 16, 2026; Rankings from AP Poll

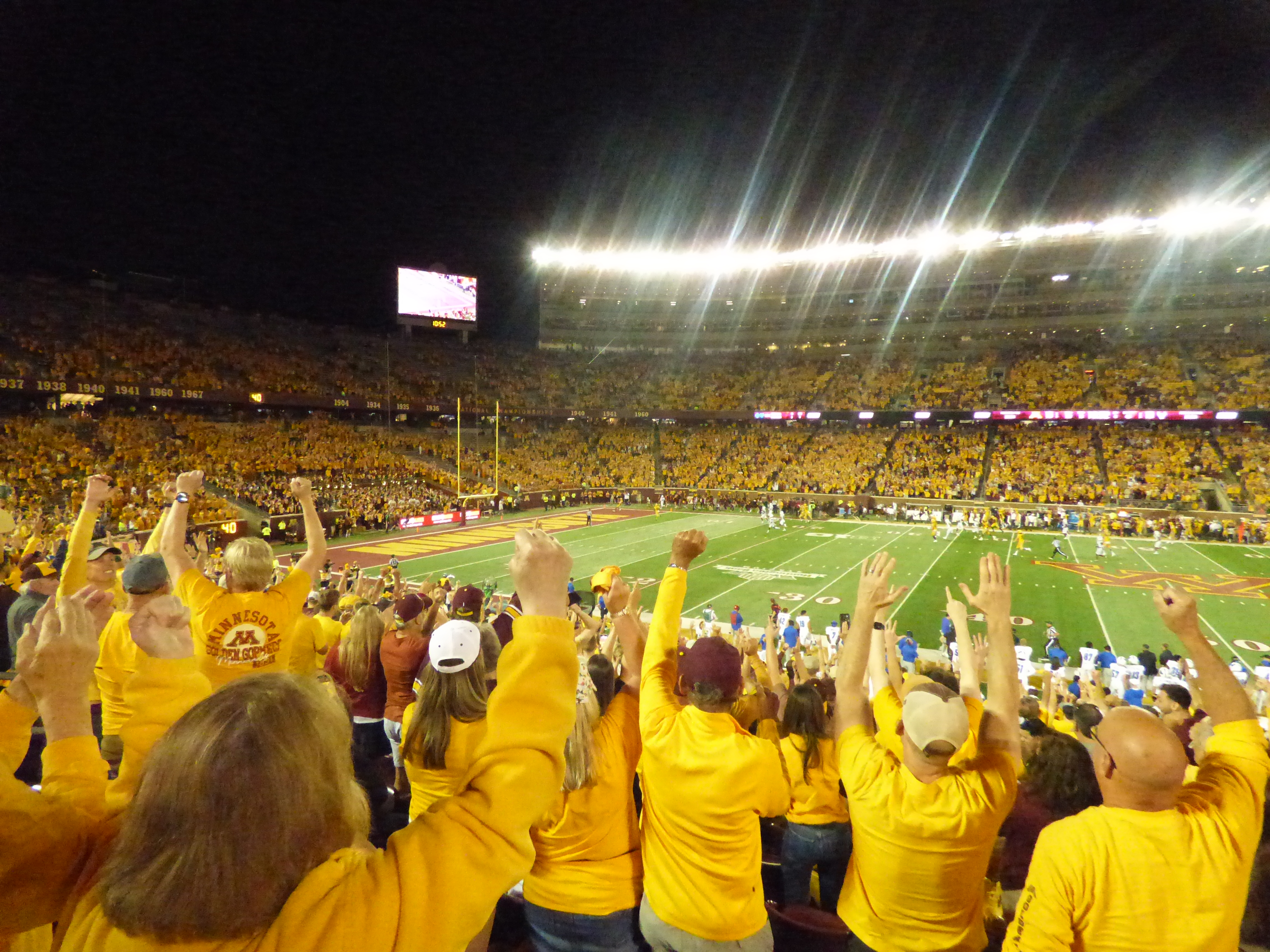

The 2025 Minnesota Golden Gophers football team represented the University of Minnesota in the Big Ten Conference during the 2025 NCAA Division I FBS football season. The Golden Gophers were led by P. J. Fleck in his ninth year as head coach. They played their home games at the Huntington Bank Stadium located in Minneapolis.

== Offseason ==
Positions key
Offense	Defense	Special teams
QB — Quarterback; RB — Running back; FB — Fullback; WR — Wide receiver; TE — Tight end; OL — Offensive lineman; T — Tackle; G — Guard; C — Center	DL — Defensive lineman; DT — Defensive tackle (Note: Includes nose tackle (NT)); DE — Defensive end; EDGE — Edge rusher; LB — Linebacker (Note: Includes middle linebacker (MLB/MIKE), weakside linebacker (WILL), strongside linebacker (SAM), off-ball linebacker, and outside linebacker (OLB)); DB — Defensive back; CB — Cornerback; S — Safety (Note: Includes free safety (FS) and strong safety (SS))	K — Kicker (Note: Also known as a placekicker (PK)); P — Punter; LS — Long snapper; RS — Return specialist (Note: Includes kickoff and punt returners)

=== Acquisitions ===
==== 2025 recruiting class ====
College recruiting
Name	Hometown	School	Height	Weight	Commit date
Emmanuel Karmo; EDGE	Minneapolis, Minnesota	Robbinsdale Cooper High School	6 ft 2 in (1.88 m)	225 lb (102 kg)	Apr 12, 2024
Emmanuel Karmo; EDGE	Recruit ratings: Rivals: 247Sports: ESPN: (81)				
Bradley Martino; WR	Naples, Florida	First Baptist Academy	6 ft 3 in (1.91 m)	165 lb (75 kg)	Jun 9, 2024
Bradley Martino; WR	Recruit ratings: Rivals: 247Sports: ESPN: (79)				
Kaveon Lee; OT	Plainfield, Illinois	Plainfield Central High School	6 ft 6 in (1.98 m)	275 lb (125 kg)	Nov 30, 2024
Kaveon Lee; OT	Recruit ratings: Rivals: 247Sports: ESPN: (78)				
Jackson Kollock; QB	Laguna Beach, California	Laguna Beach High School	6 ft 4 in (1.93 m)	220 lb (100 kg)	Mar 28, 2024
Jackson Kollock; QB	Recruit ratings: Rivals: 247Sports: ESPN: (78)				
Enoch Atewogbola; EDGE	Avon, Indiana	Avon High School	6 ft 4 in (1.93 m)	220 lb (100 kg)	Apr 27, 2024
Enoch Atewogbola; EDGE	Recruit ratings: Rivals: 247Sports: ESPN: (78)				
Jayquan Stubbs; DL	Cleveland Heights, Ohio	Cleveland Heights High School	6 ft 6 in (1.98 m)	265 lb (120 kg)	Jun 16, 2024
Jayquan Stubbs; DL	Recruit ratings: Rivals: 247Sports: ESPN: (76)				
Naiim Parrish; CB	Freehold, New Jersey	Bergen Catholic High School	5 ft 11 in (1.80 m)	170 lb (77 kg)	Jun 9, 2024
Naiim Parrish; CB	Recruit ratings: Rivals: 247Sports: ESPN: (76)				
Trey Berry; RB	Montgomery, Alabama	Sidney Lanier High School	6 ft 0 in (1.83 m)	205 lb (93 kg)	Dec 4, 2024
Trey Berry; RB	Recruit ratings: Rivals: 247Sports: ESPN: (76)				
Zachry Harden; CB	Covington, Georgia	Newton High School	6 ft 2 in (1.88 m)	190 lb (86 kg)	Mar 23, 2024
Zachry Harden; CB	Recruit ratings: Rivals: 247Sports: ESPN: (76)				
Ethan Stendel; LB	Caledonia, Minnesota	Caledonia High School	6 ft 3 in (1.91 m)	215 lb (98 kg)	Jun 5, 2024
Ethan Stendel; LB	Recruit ratings: Rivals: 247Sports: ESPN: (76)				
Xavier Ford; RB	Leesville, Louisiana	Leesville High School	5 ft 9.5 in (1.77 m)	210 lb (95 kg)	Jan 19, 2025
Xavier Ford; RB	Recruit ratings: Rivals: 247Sports: ESPN: (76)				
Daniel Shipp; OT	Eastvale, California	Centennial High School	6 ft 5 in (1.96 m)	270 lb (120 kg)	Jun 16, 2024
Daniel Shipp; OT	Recruit ratings: Rivals: 247Sports: ESPN: (76)				
Nick Spence; IOL	Peoria, Arizona	Liberty High School	6 ft 6 in (1.98 m)	280 lb (130 kg)	Jun 9, 2024
Nick Spence; IOL	Recruit ratings: Rivals: 247Sports: ESPN: (75)				
Legend Lyons; WR	Covina, California	Charter Oak High School	6 ft 2 in (1.88 m)	190 lb (86 kg)	Jun 16, 2024
Legend Lyons; WR	Recruit ratings: Rivals: 247Sports: ESPN: (75)				
Abu Tarawallie; DL	Maple Grove, Minnesota	Heritage Christian Academy	6 ft 3 in (1.91 m)	275 lb (125 kg)	Jun 7, 2024
Abu Tarawallie; DL	Recruit ratings: Rivals: 247Sports: ESPN: (75)				
Mark Handy; IOL	Albuquerque, New Mexico	La Cueva High School	6 ft 7 in (2.01 m)	320 lb (150 kg)	Jun 16, 2024
Mark Handy; IOL	Recruit ratings: Rivals: 247Sports: ESPN: (74)				
Nathan Cleveland; LB	River Grove, Illinois	Hoffman Estates High School	6 ft 1 in (1.85 m)	215 lb (98 kg)	Jun 9, 2024
Nathan Cleveland; LB	Recruit ratings: Rivals: 247Sports: ESPN: (74)				
Grant Washington; RB	Cleveland, Ohio	Saint Ignatius High School	5 ft 10 in (1.78 m)	195 lb (88 kg)	Jun 6, 2024
Grant Washington; RB	Recruit ratings: Rivals: 247Sports: ESPN: (73)				
Colin Hansen; DL	Byron, Minnesota	Byron High School	6 ft 5 in (1.96 m)	230 lb (100 kg)	Jun 5, 2024
Colin Hansen; DL	Recruit ratings: Rivals: 247Sports: ESPN: (73)				
Daniel Jackson; K	Alexandria, Minnesota	Alexandria Area High School	5 ft 9 in (1.75 m)	160 lb (73 kg)	May 11, 2024
Daniel Jackson; K	Recruit ratings: Rivals: 247Sports: ESPN: (72)				
Luke Ryerse; P	Woodbury, Minnesota	East Ridge High School	6 ft 1 in (1.85 m)	220 lb (100 kg)	Jul 27, 2024
Luke Ryerse; P	Recruit ratings: Rivals: 247Sports: ESPN: (72)				
Rhett Hlavacka; EDGE	Fond du Lac, Wisconsin	Fond du Lac High School	6 ft 5 in (1.96 m)	250 lb (110 kg)	Jun 6, 2024
Rhett Hlavacka; EDGE	Recruit ratings: Rivals: 247Sports: ESPN: (72)				
Overall recruit ranking: Rivals: 56 247Sports: 41
Note: In many cases, Scout, Rivals, 247Sports, On3, and ESPN may conflict in their listings of height and weight.; In these cases, the average was taken. ESPN grades are on a 100-point scale.; Sources: "Rivals commits". Rivals.; "ESPN commits". ESPN.; "2025 Team Ranking". Rivals.com.; "247Sports commits". 247Sports.

==== Incoming transfers ====
2025 Minnesota Golden Gophers incoming transfers
Name	No.	Pos.	Height	Weight	Year	Hometown	Prev. school	Ref.
Zach Pyron	#9	QB	6'2	220	(redshirt) Junior	Pinson, AL	Georgia Tech	
Drew Biber	#87	TE	6'4	245	(redshirt) Senior	Cedarburg, WI	Purdue	
Jaylen Bowden	#5	CB	6'1	170	Junior	Charlotte, NC	North Carolina Central	
A. J. Turner	#2	RB	6'0	190	(redshirt) Junior	Hampton, VA	Marshall	
Cam Davis	#23	RB	6'0	210	Graduate student	Upland, CA	Washington	
Javon Tracy	#11	WR	6'0	195	(redshirt) Junior	Indianapolis, IN	Miami (OH)	
Steven Curtis	#8	EDGE	6'5	250	Junior	Palm Beach, FL	Illinois State	
Rushawn Lawrence	#16	DL	6'2	270	Sixth Year	Philadelphia, PA	Stony Brook	
Brady Denaburg	#92	K	5'11	195	Senior	Merritt Island, FL	Syracuse	
Marcellus Marshall	#74	IOL	6'6	330	Sixth Year	Morgantown, WV	UCF	
Kahlee Tafai	#71	OT	6'5	330	(redshirt) Sophomore	Inglewood, CA	Washington	
Dylan Ray	#73	IOL	6'6	315	Fifth Year	Noblesville, IN	Kentucky	
Logan Loya	#13	WR	5'11	190	Sixth Year	Garden Grove, CA	UCLA	
Malachi Coleman	#16	WR	6'5	195	(redshirt) Sophomore	Lincoln, NE	Nebraska	
Jeff Roberson	#20	LB	6'2	230	Sixth Year	Choctaw, OK	Oklahoma State	
Emmett Morehead	#9	QB	6’6	230	Fifth Year	Woodside, CA	Old Dominion	
John Nestor	#17	CB	6’1	195	Junior	Chicago, IL	Iowa	
Mo Omonode	#50	DL	6’0	290	Senior	West Lafayette, IN	Purdue	
Tom Weston	#42	P	6’3	210	(redshirt) Sophomore	Perth, Western Australia	Ouachita Baptist	
Johann Cardenas	#34	RB	6’0	230	(redshirt) Freshman	Katy, TX	Vanderbilt	
Brody Richter	#25	P	6’3	205	(redshirt) Junior	Scottsdale, AZ	UCLA	
Jaden Ball	#58	IOL	6’5	300	(redshirt) Freshman	Carroll, OH	Purdue	

=== Departures ===
==== 2025 NFL draft ====
Name	Pos.	Round	Pick	Team
Aireontae Ersery	OT	2	48	Houston Texans
Justin Walley	CB	3	80	Indianapolis Colts
Cody Lindenberg	LB	7	222	Las Vegas Raiders

==== Outgoing transfers ====
2025 Minnesota Golden Gophers outgoing transfers
Name	No.	Pos.	Height	Weight	Year	Hometown	New school	Ref.
Craig McDonald	#21	S	6'2	215	(redshirt) Senior	Minneapolis, MN	Utah State	
Jordan Greenhow	#31	DB	5'10	195	(redshirt) Junior	Glen Allen, VA	Valparaiso	
Luther McCoy	#52	DL	6'4	305	(redshirt) Junior	St. Johns, FL	Hawaii	
Hayden Schwartz	#47	DL	6'4	250	(redshirt) Sophomore	Jacksonville, FL	Montana	
Sieh Bangura	#2	RB	6'0	210	(redshirt) Junior	Washington, D.C.	Ohio	
Ryan Algrim	#38	LS	6'2	230	(redshirt) Freshman	Elburn, IL	Southern Illinois	
Jack Hawkinson	#42	DL	6'3	255	(redshirt) Junior	Frankfort, IL	Minnesota State	
Zander Rockow	#40	RB	6'1	225	(redshirt) Freshman	Eau Claire, WI	St. Thomas (MN)	
Jordan Nubin	#27	RB	5'10	215	(redshirt) Junior	St. Charles, IL	Kent State	
Tyler Stolsky	#44	LB	6'3	230	(redshirt) Sophomore	Portage, MI	Florida Atlantic	
Phillip Daniels	#60	OT	6'5	315	(redshirt) Freshman	Cincinnati, OH	Ohio State	
Kristen Hoskins	#13	WR	5'9	175	(redshirt) Sophomore	Alexandria, MN	North Dakota	
T. J. McWilliams	#5	WR	6'0	190	(redshirt) Freshman	Indianapolis, IN	Louisville	
Jackson Powers	#36	DB	5'11	195	(redshirt) Freshman	Maple Grove, MN	South Dakota State	
Martin Owusu	#87	DL	6'2	300	(redshirt) Freshman	Prior Lake, MN	Fresno State	
Coleman Bryson	#16	S	6'2	215	(redshirt) Sophomore	Waynesville, NC	North Carolina	
Martes Lewis	#71	IOL	6'7	335	(redshirt) Senior	Merrillville, IN	Northwestern	
Nathan Jones	#89	TE	6'5	255	(redshirt) Sophomore	Brock, TX	Abilene Christian	
David Amaliri	#41	LB	6'4	210	(redshirt) Freshman	Winnipeg, MB	Lindenwood	
Oberhiri Eyafe	#26	DB	6'2	200	(redshirt) Freshman	Andover, MN	San Diego State	
Chris Flowers	#28	DB	5'11	170	Freshman	Waukesha, WI	Bucknell	
Zach Pyron	#9	QB	6'3	222	(redshirt) Junior	Pinson, AL	South Alabama	
Jaydon Wright	#22	QB	5'11	225	Freshman	Kankakee, IL	Louisiana–Monroe	
Jeremiah Finaly	#21	QB	6'0	185	(redshirt) Freshman	Los Alamitos, CA	TBA	
Kaeden Johnson	#33	RB	5'8	175	Freshman	Waseca, MN	Iowa Western	
Cortez LeGrant	#25	RB	5'11	185	(redshirt) Freshman	Sun Prairie, WI	North Dakota State	
Alex Elliott	#32	LB	6'2	220	(redshirt) Freshman	Hutchinson, MN	North Dakota State	
Tyler Williams	#7	WR	6'3	210	(redshirt) Freshman	Waverly, FL	South Florida	

Note: The year (class) is the one they will have with their new team.

==== Team departures ====
2025 Minnesota Golden Gophers departures
Name	No.	Pos.	Height	Weight	Year	Hometown	Reason
Ethan Robinson	#2	DB	6'0	190	Senior	Montgomery, NY	Graduated
Justin Walley	#5	DB	5'11	195	Senior	D'Iberville, MS	Graduated
Darnell Jefferies	#8	DL	6'3	285	(redshirt) Graduate student	Covington, GA	Graduated
Jaren Mangham	#8	RB	6'2	235	Sixth Year	Detroit, MI	Graduated
Daniel Jackson	#9	WR	6'0	195	Fifth Year	Kansas City, KS	Graduated
Elijah Spencer	#11	WR	6'2	200	Senior	Irmo, SC	Graduated
Max Brosmer	#16	QB	6'2	225	Graduate student	Roswell, GA	Graduated
Cade Conzemius	#17	WR	5'10	180	(redshirt) Sophomore	Minnetonka, MN	Stepped down
Jah Joyner	#17	DL	6'5	265	(redshirt) Senior	Danbury, CT	Graduated
Jack Henderson	#20	DB	6'2	215	Fifth Year	Mandeville, LA	Graduated
Marcus Major	#24	RB	6'0	220	(redshirt) Graduate student	Oklahoma City, OK	Graduated
Jake Tinnen	#34	LB	6'3	225	(redshirt) Sophomore	Brookfield, WI	Not rostered (Note: He does not appear in the official roster anymore.)
Eli Mau	#43	LB	6'2	235	(redshirt) Junior	Victoria, MN	Not rostered
Cody Lindenberg	#45	LB	6'3	240	(redshirt) Senior	Anoka, MN	Graduated
Jackson Hunter	#58	OL	6'6	310	(redshirt) Junior	Oconomowoc, WI	Graduated
Aireontae Ersery	#69	OL	6'6	330	(redshirt) Senior	Kansas City, MO	Graduated
Tyler Cooper	#75	OL	6'6	310	Sixth Year	Saint Croix Falls, WI	Graduated
Quinn Carroll	#77	OL	6'7	315	Graduate student	Edina, MN	Graduated
Nick Kallerup	#87	TE	6'5	270	Sixth Year	Wayzata, MN	Graduated
Danny Striggow	#92	DL	6'5	255	Fifth Year	Long Lake, MN	Graduated
Mark Crawford	#96	P	6'4	230	Fifth Year	Perth, Western Australia	Graduated
Logan Richter	#96	DL	6'4	320	Sixth Year	Perham, MN	Graduated
Dragan Kesich	#99	K	6'5	235	Fifth Year	Oak Creek, WI	Graduated

== Schedule ==
Date	Time	Opponent	Site	TV	Result	Attendance
August 28	7:00 p.m.	Buffalo*	Huntington Bank Stadium; Minneapolis, MN	FS1	W 23–10	47,774
September 6	11:00 a.m.	Northwestern State*	Huntington Bank Stadium; Minneapolis, MN	BTN	W 66–0	42,447
September 13	9:30 p.m.	at California*	California Memorial Stadium; Berkeley, CA	ESPN	L 14–27	38,556
September 27	11:00 a.m.	Rutgers	Huntington Bank Stadium; Minneapolis, MN	BTN	W 31–28	46,234
October 4	6:30 p.m.	at No. 1 Ohio State	Ohio Stadium; Columbus, OH	NBC	L 3–42	105,114
October 11	6:30 p.m.	Purdue^{†}	Huntington Bank Stadium; Minneapolis, MN	BTN	W 27–20	49,254
October 17	7:00 p.m.	No. 25 Nebraska	Huntington Bank Stadium; Minneapolis, MN (rivalry)	FOX	W 24–6	48,549
October 25	2:30 p.m.	at Iowa	Kinnick Stadium; Iowa City, IA (Floyd of Rosedale)	CBS	L 3–41	69,250
November 1	2:30 p.m.	Michigan State	Huntington Bank Stadium; Minneapolis, MN	BTN	W 23–20 ^{OT}	45,339
November 14	8:00 p.m.	at No. 8 Oregon	Autzen Stadium; Eugene, OR	FOX	L 13–42	58,830
November 22	11:00 a.m.	at Northwestern	Wrigley Field; Chicago, IL	BTN	L 35–38	15,323
November 29	2:30 p.m.	Wisconsin	Huntington Bank Stadium; Minneapolis, MN (Paul Bunyan’s Axe)	FS1	W 17–7	46,038
December 26	3:30 p.m.	vs. New Mexico*	Chase Field; Phoenix, AZ (Rate Bowl)	ESPN	W 20–17 ^{OT}	27,439
*Non-conference game; ^{†}Homecoming; Rankings from AP Poll (and CFP Rankings, after November 4) - Released prior to game; All times are in Central time; Source:

== Game summaries ==
=== vs Buffalo ===
Buffalo Bulls (0–0) at Minnesota Golden Gophers (0–0) – Game summary

Quarter	1	2	3	4	Total
Bulls	0	3	7	0	10
Golden Gophers	0	10	3	10	23

at Huntington Bank Stadium • Minneapolis, MN

- Date: August 28
- Game time: 7:00 p.m. CDT
- Game weather:
- Game attendance: 47,774
- Referee: Ron Snodgrass
- TV announcers (FS1): Tim Brando (play-by-play), Devin Gardner (analyst), and Josh Sims (sideline)

Game information

First quarter

- No scoring plays.

Second quarter

- MINN – Jameson Geers 9-yard pass from Drake Lindsey (Brady Denaburg kick), 13:53. Golden Gophers 7–0. Drive: 7 plays, 50 yards, 4:22.
- BUFF – Jack Howes 36-yard field goal, 7:56. Golden Gophers 7–3. Drive: 4 plays, 5 yards, 1:52.
- MINN – Brady Denaburg 38-yard field goal, 0:02. Golden Gophers 10–3. Drive: 11 plays, 50 yards, 1:15.

Third quarter

- MINN – Brady Denaburg 29-yard field goal, 11:39. Golden Gophers 13–3. Drive: 8 plays, 59 yards, 3:18.
- BUFF – Victor Snow 40-yard pass from Ta'Quan Roberson (Jack Howes kick), 6:48. Golden Gophers 13–10. Drive: 9 plays, 75 yards, 4:51.

Fourth quarter

- MINN – Brady Denaburg 25-yard field goal, 11:31. Golden Gophers 16–10. Drive: 11 plays, 46 yards, 5:45.
- MINN – Jalen Smith 60-yard pass from Drake Lindsey (Brady Denaburg kick), 10:52. Golden Gophers 23–10. Drive: 1 play, 60 yards, 0:09.

Statistics	BUFF	MINN
First downs	8	27
Plays–yards	64–151	79–443
Rushes–yards	24–44	44–153
Passing yards	107	290
Passing: comp–att–int	12–20–0	19–35–1
Turnovers	1	1
Time of possession	21:32	38:28

Team	Category	Player	Statistics
Buffalo	Passing	Ta'Quan Roberson	12/20, 107 yards, TD
Buffalo	Rushing	Al-Jay Henderson	11 carries, 25 yards
Buffalo	Receiving	Victor Snow	5 receptions, 67 yards, TD
Minnesota	Passing	Drake Lindsey	19/35, 290 yards, 2 TD, INT
Minnesota	Rushing	Darius Taylor	30 carries, 141 yards
Minnesota	Receiving	Jalen Smith	2 receptions, 76 yards, TD

=== vs Northwestern State (FCS) ===
Northwestern State Demons (FCS) (1–0) at Minnesota Golden Gophers (1–0) – Game summary

Quarter	1	2	3	4	Total
Demons (FCS)	0	0	0	0	0
Golden Gophers	35	24	7	0	66

at Huntington Bank Stadium • Minneapolis, MN

- Date: September 6
- Game time: 11:00 a.m. CDT
- Game weather:
- Game attendance: 42,447
- Referee: Gregory Blum
- TV announcers (BTN): Jason Ross Jr. (play-by-play), Tanner Morgan (analyst), and Emma Carpenter (sideline)

Game information

First quarter

- MINN – John Nestor 29-yard interception return (Brady Denaburg kick), 14:54. Golden Gophers 7–0.
- MINN – A.J. Turner 1-yard run (Brady Denaburg kick), 9:33. Golden Gophers 14–0. Drive: 7 plays, 50 yards, 3:40.
- MINN – Le'Meke Brockington 7-yard run (Brady Denaburg kick), 5:32. Golden Gophers 21–0. Drive: 7 plays, 44 yards, 3:00.
- MINN – Drake Lindsey 1-yard run (Brady Denaburg kick), 1:07. Golden Gophers 28–0. Drive: 4 plays, 41 yards, 2:05.
- MINN – Matt Kingsbury 25-yard fumble return (Brady Denaburg kick), 0:27. Golden Gophers 35–0.

Second quarter

- MINN – Javon Tracy 45-yard pass from Drake Lindsey (Brady Denaburg kick), 12:20. Golden Gophers 42–0. Drive: 4 plays, 67 yards, 1:45.
- MINN – Cam Davis 7-yard run (Brady Denaburg kick), 10:43. Golden Gophers 49–0. Drive: 4 plays, 31 yards, 1:24.
- MINN – Fame Ijeboi 22-yard pass from Max Shikenjanski (Daniel Jackson kick), 5:40. Golden Gophers 56–0. Drive: 5 plays, 48 yards, 2:48.
- MINN – Brady Denaburg 27-yard field goal, 2:38. Golden Gophers 59–0. Drive: 4 plays, -3 yards, 2:03.

Third quarter

- MINN – Max Shikenjanski 8-yard run (Daniel Jackson kick), 11:47. Golden Gophers 66–0. Drive: 6 plays, 75 yards, 3:13.

Fourth quarter

- No scoring plays.

Statistics	NSWT	MINN
First downs	2	25
Plays–yards	37–42	63–484
Rushes–yards	22–19	46–258
Passing yards	23	226
Passing: comp–att–int	9–15–2	13–17–1
Turnovers	4	1
Time of possession	20:32	33:13

Team	Category	Player	Statistics
Northwestern State	Passing	Eli Anderson	3/4, 13 yards
Northwestern State	Rushing	Jeremiah James	3 carries, 8 yards
Northwestern State	Receiving	Myion Hicks	2 receptions, 10 yards
Minnesota	Passing	Drake Lindsey	8/9, 139 yards, TD
Minnesota	Rushing	Grant Washington	20 carries, 126 yards
Minnesota	Receiving	Kenric Lanier II	2 receptions, 59 yards

=== at California ===
Minnesota Golden Gophers (2–0) at California Golden Bears (2–0) – Game summary

Quarter	1	2	3	4	Total
Golden Gophers	0	7	7	0	14
Golden Bears	7	3	7	10	27

at California Memorial Stadium • Berkeley, CA

- Date: September 13
- Game time: 9:30 p.m. CDT
- Game weather: Temperature: 62 °F (17 °C) • Wind: SW at 14 miles per hour (23 km/h) • Weather: Clear
- Game attendance: 38,556
- Referee: Nate Black
- TV announcers (ESPN): Dave Flemming (play-by-play), Brock Osweiler (analyst), and Stormy Buonantony (sideline)
- Box Score

Game information

First quarter

- (2:54) CAL – Jacob De Jesus 3-yard pass from Jaron-Keawe Sagapolutele, Chase Meyer kick (Drive: 7 plays, 62 yards, 2:22; California 7–0.)

Second quarter

- (0:43) MIN – Cam Davis 1-yard run, Brady Denaburg kick (Drive: 16 plays, 69 yards, 6:34; California 7–7)
- (0:00) CAL – Abram Murray 45-yard field goal (Drive: 6 plays, 48 yards, 0:43; California 10–7)

Third quarter

- (4:36) MIN – Jameson Geers 3-yard pass from Drake Lindsey, Brady Denaburg kick (Drive: 9 plays, 64 yards, 5:52; Minnesota 14–10)
- (0:20) CAL – Mason Mini 9-yard pass from Jaron-Keawe Sagapolutele, Chase Meyer kick (Drive: 9 plays, 75 yards, 4:16; California 17–14)

Fourth quarter

- (6:55) CAL – Jordan King 2-yard pass from Jaron-Keawe Sagapolutele, Chase Meyer kick (Drive: 3 plays, 8 yards, 1:07; California 24–14)
- (1:10) CAL - Chase Meyer 38-yard field goal (Drive: 10 plays, 32 yards, 4:30; California 27–14)

Statistics	MINN	CAL
First downs	19	19
Plays–yards	69–335	69–340
Rushes–yards	37–130	24–61
Passing yards	205	279
Passing: comp–att–int	19–32–1	24–39–0
Turnovers	2	0
Time of possession	33:56	23:04

Team	Category	Player	Statistics
Minnesota	Passing	Drake Lindsey	19/32, 205 yards, TD, INT
Minnesota	Rushing	Fame Ijeboi	16 carries, 85 yards
Minnesota	Receiving	Le'Meke Brockington	8 receptions, 106 yards
California	Passing	Jaron-Keawe; Sagapolutele	24/38, 279 yards, 3 TD
California	Rushing	Kendrick Raphael	13 carries, 47 yards
California	Receiving	Trond Grizzell	4 receptions, 60 yards

=== vs Rutgers ===
Rutgers Scarlet Knights (3–1) at Minnesota Golden Gophers (2–1) – Game summary

Quarter	1	2	3	4	Total
Scarlet Knights	7	14	0	7	28
Golden Gophers	0	14	10	7	31

at Huntington Bank Stadium • Minneapolis, MN

- Date: September 27
- Game time: 11:00 a.m. CDT
- Game weather: Sunny • Temperature: 66 °F (19 °C) • Wind: N 11 mph
- Game attendance: 46,234
- Referee: Jeff Servinski
- TV announcers (BTN): Guy Haberman (play-by-play), Yogi Roth (analyst), and Rhett Lewis (sideline)

Game information

First quarter

- (3:16) RUTG – DT Sheffield 4-yard pass from Athan Kaliakmanis, Jai Patel kick (Drive: 8 plays, 62 yards, 4:14; Rutgers 7–0)

Second quarter

- (10:43) RUTG – KJ Duff 14-yard pass from Athan Kaliakmanis, Jai Patel kick (Drive: 12 plays, 68 yards, 4:41; Rutgers 14–0)
- (8:52) MINN – Fame Ijeboi 2-yard run, Brady Denaburg kick (Drive: 3 plays, 81 yards, 1:44; Rutgers 14–7)
- (7:58) MINN – Lemeke Brockington 8-yard pass from Drake Lindsey, Brady Denaburg kick (Drive: 1 play, 8 yards, 0:07; Tied 14–14)
- (0:18) RUTG – Athan Kaliakmanis 2-yard run, Jai Patel kick (Drive: 7 plays, 63 yards, 0:48; Rutgers 21–14)

Third quarter

- (9:18) MINN – Jalen Smith 9-yard pass from Drake Lindsey, Brady Denaburg kick (Drive: 13 plays, 85 yards, 5:39; Rutgers 21–21)
- (0:11) MINN – Brady Denaburg 26-yard field goal (Drive: 14 plays, 75 yards, 6:59; Minnesota 24–21)

Fourth quarter

- (11:28) RUTG – Athan Kaliakmanis 4-yard run, Jai Patel kick (Drive: 9 plays, 75 yards, 3:43; Rutgers 28–24)
- (3:19) MINN – Javon Tracy 4-yard pass from Drake Lindsey, Brady Denaburg kick (Drive: 7 plays, 72 yards, 3:05; Minnesota 31–28)

Statistics	RUTG	MINN
First downs	29	20
Plays–yards	76–387	59–359
Rushes–yards	42–138	18–35
Passing yards	249	324
Passing: comp–att–int	21–34–1	31–41–0
Turnovers	1	0
Time of possession	31:05	28:55

Team	Category	Player	Statistics
Rutgers	Passing	Athan Kaliakmanis	21/34, 249 yards, 2 TD, INT
Rutgers	Rushing	Antwan Raymond	26 carries, 161 yards, 2 TD
Rutgers	Receiving	KJ Duff	6 receptions, 84 yards, TD
Minnesota	Passing	Drake Lindsey	31/41, 324 yards, 3 TD
Minnesota	Rushing	Fame Ijeboi	12 carries, 37 yards, TD
Minnesota	Receiving	Jalen Smith	4 receptions, 103 yards, TD

=== at No. 1 Ohio State ===
Minnesota Golden Gophers (3–1) at No. 1 Ohio State Buckeyes (4–0) – Game summary

Quarter	1	2	3	4	Total
Golden Gophers	3	0	0	0	3
No. 1 Buckeyes	7	14	7	14	42

at Ohio Stadium • Columbus, OH

- Date: October 4
- Game time: 6:30 p.m. CDT
- Game weather: Clear • Temperature: 77 °F (25 °C) • Wind: S at 4 miles per hour (6.4 km/h)
- Game attendance: 105,114
- Referee: Mark Kluczynski
- TV announcers (NBC): Noah Eagle (play-by-play), Todd Blackledge (analyst), and Kathryn Tappen (sideline)

Game information

First quarter

- (8:05) MINN – Brady Denaburg 27-yard field goal (Drive: 13 plays, 66 yards, 6:55; Minnesota 3–0)
- (0:00) OSU – CJ Donaldson 1-yard run, Jayden Fielding kick (Drive: 7 plays, 91 yards, 3:41; Ohio State 7–3)

Second quarter

- (11:01) OSU – Jeremiah Smith 6-yard pass from Julian Sayin, Jayden Fielding kick (Drive: 8 plays, 80 yards, 2:56; Ohio State 14–3)
- (8:04) OSU – Carnell Tate 44-yard pass from Julian Sayin, Jayden Fielding kick (Drive: 1 play, 44 yards, 0:08; Ohio State 21–3)

Third quarter

- (5:45) OSU – Bo Jackson 5-yard run, Jayden Fielding kick (Drive: 3 plays, 20 yards, 1:46; Ohio State 28–3)

Fourth quarter

- (14:55) OSU – Jeremiah Smith 9-yard pass from Julian Sayin, Jayden Fielding kick (Drive: 9 plays, 72 yards, 4:14; Ohio State 35–3)
- (3:49) OSU – Lincoln Kienholz 1-yard run, Jayden Fielding kick (Drive: 9 plays, 77 yards, 5:37; Ohio State 42–3)

Statistics	MINN	OSU
First downs	11	21
Plays–yards	51–162	58–474
Rushes–yards	25–68	30–133
Passing yards	94	341
Passing: comp–att–int	15–26–0	24–28–0
Turnovers	0	0
Time of possession	28:08	31:52

Team	Category	Player	Statistics
Minnesota	Passing	Drake Lindsey	15/26, 94 yards
Minnesota	Rushing	Fame Ijeboi	13 carries, 52 yards
Minnesota	Receiving	Jameson Geers	1 reception, 25 yards
Ohio State	Passing	Julian Sayin	23/27, 326 yards, 3 TD
Ohio State	Rushing	Bo Jackson	13 carries, 63 yards, TD
Ohio State	Receiving	Carnell Tate	9 receptions, 183 yards, TD

=== vs Purdue ===
Purdue Boilermakers (2–3) at Minnesota Golden Gophers (3–2) – Game summary

Quarter	1	2	3	4	Total
Boilermakers	7	10	3	0	20
Golden Gophers	0	13	0	14	27

at Huntington Bank Stadium • Minneapolis, MN

- Date: October 11
- Game time: 6:30 p.m. CDT
- Game weather: Sunny • Temperature: 64 °F (18 °C)
- Game attendance: 49,254
- Referee: Ron Snodgrass
- TV announcers (BTN): Chris Vosters (play-by-play), Anthony Herron (analyst) and Dannie Rogers (sideline)

Game information

First quarter

- (12:12) PUR – Malachi Singleton 40-yard run, Spencer Porath kick (Drive: 7 plays, 75 yards, 2:48; Purdue 7-0)

Second quarter

- (11:09) PUR – Spencer Porath 33-yard field goal (Drive: 8 plays, 33 yards, 2:39; Purdue 10-0)
- (9:46) MINN – Le'Meke Brockington 24-yard pass from Drake Lindsey, Brady Denaburg kick (Drive: 3 plays, 75 yards, 1:23; Purdue 10-7)
- (8:44) MINN – Brady Denaburg 46-yard field goal (Drive: 4 plays, 1 yards, 0:55; Purdue 10-10)
- (1:52) PUR – Ryan Browne 12-yard run, Spencer Porath kick (Drive: 13 plays, 75 yards, 6:52; Purdue 17-10)
- (0:00) MINN – Brady Denaburg 29-yard field goal (Drive: 12 plays, 75 yards, 1:23; Purdue 17-13)

Third quarter

- (8:20) PUR – Spencer Porath 20-yard field goal (Drive: 13 plays, 64 yards, 1:52; Purdue 20-13)

Fourth quarter

- (7:47) MINN – Jameson Geers 4-yard pass from Drake Lindsey, Brady Denaburg kick (Drive: 14 plays, 70 yards, 6:29; 20-20)
- (7:40) MINN – Koi Perich 27-yard interception return, Brady Denaburg kick (Drive: 1 play, 0 yards, 0:07; Minnesota 27-20)

Statistics	PUR	MINN
First downs	25	17
Plays–yards	82–456	63–262
Rushes–yards	40–253	18–30
Passing yards	203	232
Passing: comp–att–int	21–42–3	21–45–1
Turnovers	4	1
Time of possession	34:30	25:30

Team	Category	Player	Statistics
Purdue	Passing	Ryan Browne	21/40, 203 yards, 2 INT
Purdue	Rushing	Devin Mockobee	21 carries, 98 yards
Purdue	Receiving	Nitro Tuggle	3 receptions, 58 yards
Minnesota	Passing	Drake Lindsey	21/45, 232 yards, 2 TD, INT
Minnesota	Rushing	Darius Taylor	14 carries, 32 yards
Minnesota	Receiving	Darius Taylor	6 receptions, 67 yards

=== vs No. 25 Nebraska (rivalry) ===
No. 25 Nebraska Cornhuskers (5–1) at Minnesota Golden Gophers (4–2) – Game summary

Quarter	1	2	3	4	Total
No. 25 Cornhuskers	3	3	0	0	6
Golden Gophers	0	7	7	10	24

at Huntington Bank Stadium • Minneapolis, MN

- Date: October 17
- Game time: 7:00 p.m. CDT
- Game weather: Clear, 63 degrees, Wind W @ 6 mph
- Game attendance: 48,549
- Referee: Bryan Banks
- TV announcers (FOX): Tim Brando (play-by-play), Devin Gardner (analyst), and Josh Sims (sideline reporter)
- Sources: huskers.com

Game information

First Quarter

- (0:00) NEB – Kyle Cunanan 33-yard field goal (Drive: 12 plays, 70 yards, 6:42, Nebraska 3-0)

Second Quarter

- (13:20) MIN - Drake Lindsey 1-yard run, Brady Denaburg kick (Drive: 4 plays, 90 yards, 1:34, Minnesota 7-3)
- (4:25) NEB - Kyle Cunanan 30-yard field goal (Drive: 9 plays, 69 yards, 5:28, Minnesota 7-6)

Third Quarter

- (2:36) MIN - Lemeke Brockington 20-yard pass from Drake Lindsey, Brady Denaburg kick (Drive: 14 plays, 98 yards, 8:43, Minnesota 14-6)

Fourth Quarter

- (12:32) MIN - Darius Taylor 1-yard run, Brady Denaburg kick (Drive: 4 plays, 40 yards, 1:36, Minnesota 21-6)
- (5:14) MIN - Brady Denaburg 30-yard field goal (Drive: 8 plays, 62 yards, 4:23, Minnesota 24-6)

Statistics	NEB	MINN
First downs	13	18
Plays–yards	54–213	55–339
Rushes–yards	29–36	35–186
Passing yards	177	153
Passing: Comp–Att–Int	17-25-0	16-20-0
Turnovers	0	0
Time of possession	28:01	31:59

Team	Category	Player	Statistics
Nebraska	Passing	Dylan Raiola	17-25, 177 yards
Nebraska	Rushing	Emmett Johnson	14 carries, 63 yards
Nebraska	Receiving	Luke Lindenmeyer	4 receptions, 52 yards
Minnesota	Passing	Drake Lindsey	16-20, 153 yards, TD
Minnesota	Rushing	Darius Taylor	24 carries, 148 yards, TD
Minnesota	Receiving	Jalen Smith	3 receptions, 59 yards

=== at Iowa (Floyd of Rosedale) ===
Minnesota Golden Gophers (5–2) at Iowa Hawkeyes (5–2) – Game summary

Quarter	1	2	3	4	Total
Golden Gophers	0	0	3	0	3
Hawkeyes	17	14	3	7	41

at Kinnick Stadium • Iowa City, IA

- Date: October 25
- Game time: 2:30 p.m. CDT
- Game weather: 55 °F (13 °C), Cloudy, Wind SE 10 mph (16 km/h)
- Game attendance: 69,250
- Referee: Kole Knueppel
- TV announcers (CBS): Brad Nessler (play-by-play), Gary Danielson (analyst), and Jenny Dell (sideline)

Game information

First quarter

- IOWA – Mark Gronowski 2-yard run (Drew Stevens kick), 10:06. Hawkeyes 7–0. 9 plays, 75 yards, 4:54.
- IOWA – Drew Stevens 34-yard field goal, 3:19. Hawkeyes 10–0. 10 plays, 46 yards, 5:04.
- IOWA – Zach Lutmer 34-yard interception return (Drew Stevens kick), 2:57. Hawkeyes 17–0. 1 play, 0:17.

Second quarter

- IOWA – Reece Vander Zee 29-yard pass from Mark Gronowski (Drew Stevens kick), 13:33. Hawkeyes 24–0. 5 plays, 45 yards, 2:55.
- IOWA – Kaden Wetjen 50-yard punt return (Drew Stevens kick), 11:23. Hawkeyes 31–0.

Third quarter

- IOWA – Drew Stevens 46-yard field goal, 4:06. Hawkeyes 34–0. 6 plays, 20 yards, 3:40.
- MINN – Brady Denaburg 34-yard field goal, 0:03. Hawkeyes 34–3. 10 plays, 59 yards, 4:03.

Fourth quarter

- IOWA – Jeremy Hecklinski 6-yard run (Drew Stevens kick), 5:30. Hawkeyes 41–3. 5 plays, 21 yards, 2:39.

Statistics	MINN	IOWA
First downs	10	13
Plays–yards	53–133	56–274
Rushes–yards	25–24	36–133
Passing yards	109	141
Passing: comp–att–int	16–28–3	13–20–0
Turnovers	3	0
Time of possession	26:50	33:10

Team	Category	Player	Statistics
Minnesota	Passing	Drake Lindsey	16/28, 109 yards, 3 INT
Minnesota	Rushing	Xavier Ford	8 carries, 25 yards
Minnesota	Receiving	Le'Meke Brockington	6 receptions, 54 yards
Iowa	Passing	Mark Gronowski	12/19, 135 yards, TD
Iowa	Rushing	Kamari Moulton	15 carries, 75 yards
Iowa	Receiving	Kaden Wetjen	3 receptions, 49 yards

=== vs Michigan State ===
Michigan State Spartans (3–5) at Minnesota Golden Gophers (5–3) – Game summary

Quarter	1	2	3	4	OT	Total
Spartans	0	0	7	10	3	20
Golden Gophers	7	3	0	7	6	23

at Huntington Bank Stadium • Minneapolis, MN

- Date: November 1
- Game time: 2:30 p.m. CDT
- Game weather: 45 °F (7 °C), sunny, S 4 miles per hour (6.4 km/h)
- Game attendance: 45,339
- Referee: Tim O'Dey
- TV announcers (BTN): Guy Haberman (play-by-play), Yogi Roth (analyst), and Rhett Lewis (sideline)

Game information

First quarter

- (2:24) MINN – Fame Ijeboi 1-yard run, Brady Denaburg kick (Drive: 5 plays, 63 yards, 2:10; Minnesota 7-0)

Second quarter

- (9:10) MINN – Brady Denaburg 30-yard field goal (Drive: 10 plays, 51 yards, 4:34; Minnesota 10-0)

Third quarter

- (14:05) MSU – Rodney Bullard Jr. 71-yard pass from Alessio Milivojevic, Martin Connington kick (Drive: 3 plays, 75 yards, 0:55; Minnesota 10-7)

Fourth quarter

- (14:16) MSU – Martin Connington 34-yard field goal (Drive: 3 plays, 88 yards, 1:07; 10-10)
- (1:52) MSU – Brandon Tullis 1-yard run, Martin Connington kick (Drive: 3 plays, 88 yards, 1:07; Michigan State 17-10)
- (0:29) MINN – Drake Lindsey 2-yard run, Brady Denaburg kick (Drive: 9 plays, 65 yards, 1:23; 17-17)

Overtime

- MSU – Martin Connington 36-yard field goal (Drive: 4 plays, 7 yards Michigan State 20-17)
- MINN – Drake Lindsey 3-yard run (Drive: 5 plays, 25 yards Minnesota 23-20)

Statistics	MSU	MINN
First downs	19	18
Plays–yards	69–467	62–301
Rushes–yards	41–156	23–104
Passing yards	311	197
Passing: comp–att–int	20–28–0	26–39–0
Turnovers	0	0
Time of possession	34:34	25:26

Team	Category	Player	Statistics
Michigan State	Passing	Alessio Milivojevic	20/28, 311 yards, TD
Michigan State	Rushing	Elijah Tau-Tolliver	11 carries, 127 yards
Michigan State	Receiving	Rodney Bullard Jr.	4 receptions, 102 yards, TD
Minnesota	Passing	Drake Lindsey	26/39, 197 yards
Minnesota	Rushing	Fame Ijeboi	17 carries, 108 yards, TD
Minnesota	Receiving	Javon Tracy	7 receptions, 61 yards

=== at No. 8 Oregon ===
Minnesota Golden Gophers (6–3) at No. 8 Oregon Ducks (8–1) – Game summary

Quarter	1	2	3	4	Total
Golden Gophers	0	6	7	0	13
No. 8 Ducks	14	14	7	7	42

at Autzen Stadium • Eugene, OR

- Date: November 14
- Game time: 8:00 p.m. CST
- Game weather:
- Game attendance: 58,830
- Referee: Francisco Villar
- TV announcers (FOX): Jason Benetti (play-by-play), Robert Griffin III (analyst), and Alexa Landestoy (sideline)

Game information

First quarter

- ORE – Jordon Davison 1-yard run (Atticus Sappington kick), 10:48. Ducks 7–0. Drive: 9 plays, 75 yards, 4:12.
- ORE – Jordon Davison 39-yard run (Atticus Sappington kick), 7:23. Ducks 14–0. Drive: 4 plays, 66 yards, 2:00.

Second quarter

- MINN – Brady Denaburg 46-yard field goal, 11:39. Ducks 14–3. Drive: 7 plays, 14 yards, 3:15.
- ORE – Noah Whittington 40-yard run (Atticus Sappington kick), 9:31. Ducks 21–3. Drive: 4 plays, 75 yards, 2:08.
- MINN – Brady Denaburg 26-yard field goal, 2:25. Ducks 21–6. Drive: 13 plays, 76 yards, 7:06.
- ORE – Kenyon Sadiq 3-yard pass from Dante Moore (Gage Hurych kick), 0:37. Ducks 28–6. Drive: 8 plays, 75 yards, 1:48.

Third quarter

- MINN – Javon Tracy 10-yard pass from Drake Lindsey (Brady Denaburg kick), 8:17. Ducks 28–13. Drive: 10 plays, 80 yards, 6:38.
- ORE – Jeremiah McClellan 13-yard pass from Dante Moore (Atticus Sappington kick), 2:52. Ducks 35–13. Drive: 11 plays, 75 yards, 5:25.

Fourth quarter

- ORE – Jay Harris 12-yard run (Atticus Sappington kick), 11:09. Ducks 42–13. Drive: 7 plays, 70 yards, 3:06.

Statistics	MINN	ORE
First downs	13	27
Plays–yards	57–200	63–510
Rushes–yards	24–62	30–179
Passing yards	138	331
Passing: comp–att–int	19–33–0	30–33–0
Turnovers	0	1
Time of possession	30:24	29:36

Team	Category	Player	Statistics
Minnesota	Passing	Drake Lindsey	19/32, 138 yards, TD
Minnesota	Rushing	Darius Taylor	10 carries, 57 yards
Minnesota	Receiving	Darius Taylor	4 receptions, 40 yards
Oregon	Passing	Dante Moore	27/30, 306 yards, 2 TD
Oregon	Rushing	Noah Whittington	8 carries, 72 yards, TD
Oregon	Receiving	Kenyon Sadiq	8 receptions, 96 yards, TD

=== at Northwestern ===
Minnesota Golden Gophers (6–4) at Northwestern Wildcats (5–5) – Game summary

Quarter	1	2	3	4	Total
Golden Gophers	0	21	7	7	35
Wildcats	10	3	15	10	38

at Wrigley Field • Chicago, IL

- Date: November 22
- Game time: 11:00 a.m. CST
- Game weather:
- Game attendance: 15,323
- Referee: Jeff Servinski
- TV announcers (BTN): Jack Kizer (play-by-play), Matt Millen (analyst) and Sydney Supple (sideline)

Game information

First quarter

- NU – Caleb Komolafe 46-yard run (Jack Olsen kick), 12:05. Wildcats 7–0. Drive: 6 plays, 75 yards, 2:55.
- NU – Jack Olsen 34-yard field goal, 0:51. Wildcats 10–0. Drive: 15 plays, 51 yards, 8:43.

Second quarter

- MINN – Darius Taylor 1-yard run (Brady Denaburg kick), 13:35. Wildcats 10–7. Drive: 4 plays, 5 yards, 2:02.
- NU – Jack Olsen 35-yard field goal, 7:38. Wildcats 13–7. Drive: 10 plays, 58 yards, 5:50.
- MINN – Javon Tracy 5-yard pass from Drake Lindsey (Brady Denaburg kick), 3:09. Golden Gophers 14–13. Drive: 11 plays, 75 yards, 4:29.
- MINN – Javon Tracy 24-yard pass from Drake Lindsey (Brady Denaburg kick), 0:12. Golden Gophers 21–13. Drive: 8 plays, 62 yards, 1:48.

Third quarter

- MINN – Javon Tracy 28-yard pass from Drake Lindsey (Brady Denaburg kick), 12:43. Golden Gophers 28–13. Drive: 1 play, 28 yards, 0:09.
- NU – Griffin Wilde 4-yard pass from Preston Stone (Henry Helms–Robby Preckel pass), 7:01. Golden Gophers 28–21. Drive: 9 plays, 79 yards, 5:37.
- NU – Joseph Himmon II 20-yard run (Jack Olsen kick), 0:28. Tied 28–28. Drive: 7 plays, 70 yards, 4:14.

Fourth quarter

- NU – Caleb Komolafe 2-yard pass from Preston Stone (Jack Olsen kick), 10:20. Wildcats 35–28. Drive: 8 plays, 70 yards, 4:29.
- MINN – Le'Meke Brockington 8-yard pass from Drake Lindsey (Brady Denaburg kick), 8:20. Tied 35–35. Drive: 6 plays, 75 yards, 2:00.
- NU – Jack Olsen 33-yard field goal, 0:53. Wildcats 38–35. Drive: 14 plays, 59 yards, 7:27.

Statistics	MINN	NU
First downs	15	25
Plays–yards	48–323	70–525
Rushes–yards	17–59	39–220
Passing yards	264	305
Passing: comp–att–int	20–31–0	25–31–0
Turnovers	0	1
Time of possession	19:12	40:48

Team	Category	Player	Statistics
Minnesota	Passing	Drake Lindsey	20/30, 264 yards, 4 TD
Minnesota	Rushing	Darius Taylor	10 carries, 43 yards, TD
Minnesota	Receiving	Javon Tracy	4 receptions, 87 yards, 3 TD
Northwestern	Passing	Preston Stone	25/30, 305 yards, 2 TD
Northwestern	Rushing	Caleb Komolafe	22 carries, 129 yards, TD
Northwestern	Receiving	Hayden Eligon II	7 receptions, 127 yards

=== vs Wisconsin (Paul Bunyan's Axe) ===
Wisconsin Badgers (4-7) at Minnesota Golden Gophers (6-5) – Game summary

Quarter	1	2	3	4	Total
Badgers	0	7	0	0	7
Golden Gophers	0	10	7	0	17

at Huntington Bank Stadium • Minneapolis, MN

- Date: November 29
- Game time: 2:30 p.m. CST
- Game weather: Snow, 23 °F (−5 °C); Wind: SW 10 mph
- Game attendance: 46,038
- Referee: Tim O'Dey
- TV announcers (FS1): Noah Reed (play-by-play) and Robert Smith (analyst)

Game information

First quarter

- No scoring plays.

Second quarter

- MIN – Brady Denaburg 33-yard field goal, 6:32. Minnesota 7–0. 7 plays, 20 yards, 3:54.
- MIN – Darius Taylor 49-yard run (Brady Denaburg kick), 2:45. Minnesota 10–0. 3 plays, 55 yards, 1:27.
- WIS – Jackson Acker 1-yard pass from Carter Smith (Nathanial Vakos kick), 0:21 Minnesota 10–7 Drive: 7 plays, 75 yards, 2:24.

Third quarter

- MIN – Jameson Geers 13-yard pass from Drake Lindsey (Brady Denaburg kick), 5:04 Minnesota 17–7 Drive: 3 plays, 16 yards, 1:22.

Fourth quarter

- No scoring plays.

Statistics	WIS	MINN
First downs	11	13
Plays–yards	55–268	56–218
Rushes–yards	28–86	32–128
Passing yards	182	90
Passing: comp–att–int	17–27–2	18–24–0
Turnovers	3	0
Time of possession	29:28	30:32

Team	Category	Player	Statistics
Wisconsin	Passing	Carter Smith	5/8, 20 yards, TD
Wisconsin	Rushing	Darrion Dupree	12 carries, 51 yards
Wisconsin	Receiving	Vinny Anthony II	4 receptions, 92 yards
Minnesota	Passing	Drake Lindsey	18/24, 90 yards, TD
Minnesota	Rushing	Darius Taylor	19 carries, 100 yards, TD
Minnesota	Receiving	Jameson Geers	4 receptions, 27 yards, TD

=== vs. New Mexico (Rate Bowl) ===
2025 Rate Bowl
New Mexico Lobos (9–3) vs Minnesota Golden Gophers (7–5) – Game summary

Quarter	1	2	3	4	OT	Total
Lobos	3	3	0	8	3	17
Golden Gophers	0	7	0	7	6	20

at Chase Field • Phoenix, AZ

- Date: December 26
- Game time: 3:30 p.m. CST
- Game weather: None (retractable roof closed)
- Game attendance: 27,439
- Referee: Cravonne Barrett
- TV announcers (ESPN): Mike Monaco (play-by-play), Kirk Morrison (analyst) and Dawn Davenport (sideline)

Game information

First quarter

- (1:47) UNM – Luke Drzewiecki 31-yard field goal (15 plays, 66 yards, 8:35; UNM 3–0)

Second quarter

- (6:18) UNM – Luke Drzewiecki 29-yard field goal (11 plays, 34 yards, 5:57; UNM 6–0)
- (2:00) MINN – Jalen Smith 10-yard pass from Drake Lindsey (Brady Denaburg kick) (9 plays, 75 yards, 4:21; MINN 7–6)

Third quarter

- No scoring plays.

Fourth quarter

- (13:34) MINN – Darius Taylor 5-yard run (Brady Denaburg kick) (12 plays, 80 yards, 6:37; MINN 14–6)
- (13:30) UNM – Damon Bankston 100-yard kickoff return (Jack Layne pass to Keagan Johnson for two-point conversion) (Tied 14–14)

Overtime

- (OT) UNM – Luke Drzewiecki 36-yard field goal (4 plays, 6 yards; UNM 17–14)
- (OT) MINN – Jalen Smith 12-yard pass from Drake Lindsey (4 plays, 25 yards; MINN 20–17)

Statistics	UNM	MINN
First downs	17	16
Plays–yards	66–204	60–252
Rushes–yards	38–116	32–105
Passing yards	88	147
Passing: Comp–Att–Int	15–28–1	18–28–0
Turnovers	1	1
Time of possession	30:29	29:31

Team	Category	Player	Statistics
New Mexico	Passing	Jack Layne	14/25, 88 yards, INT
New Mexico	Rushing	Damon Bankston	10 carries, 57 yards
New Mexico	Receiving	Keagan Johnson	4 receptions, 42 yards
Minnesota	Passing	Drake Lindsey	18/28, 147 yards, 2 TD
Minnesota	Rushing	Darius Taylor	24 carries, 116 yards, TD
Minnesota	Receiving	Jalen Smith	6 receptions, 64 yards, 2 TD

== Roster ==
2025 Minnesota Golden Gophers football team roster
Players
Coaches
Offense

Pos.	#	Name	Class
WR	0	Le'Meke Brockington	Sr
RB	1	Darius Taylor	Jr
RB	2	A.J. Turner (injured)	Jr
RB	3	Fame Ijeboi	Fr
WR	4	Cristian Driver	Jr
QB	5	Drake Lindsey	Fr
QB	6	Max Shikenjanski	So
WR	7	Legend Lyons	Fr
WR	8	Jalen Smith	Fr
QB	9	Emmett Morehead	Sr
WR	11	Javon Tracy	Jr
QB	12	Jackson Kollock	Fr
WR	13	Bradley Martino	Fr
QB	14	Dylan Wittke	So
WR	15	Kenric Lanier II	So
WR	16	Malachi Coleman	So
WR	17	Logan Loya	GS
WR	18	Donielle Hayes	So
TE	19	Pierce Walsh	So
RB	21	Grant Washington	Fr
RB	22	Tre Berry	Fr
RB	23	Cam Davis	GS
RB	31	Xavier Ford	Fr
TE	44	Frank Bierman	GS
OL	50	Nathan Roy	Fr
OL	51	Daniel Shipp	Fr
OL	52	Spencer Alvarez	Jr
OL	55	Jerome Williams	So
OL	56	Brett Carroll	Fr
OL	58	Jaden Ball	Fr
OL	59	Tony Nelson	Jr
OL	60	Kaveon Lee	Fr
OL	65	Greg Johnson	Jr
OL	70	Aluma Nkele	Sr
OL	71	Kahlee Tafai	So
OL	73	Dylan Ray	Sr
OL	74	Marcellus Marshall	GS
OL	75	Mark Handy	Fr
OL	76	Reese Tripp	So
OL	77	Nick Spence	Fr
OL	78	Ashton Beers	Jr
WR	81	Quentin Redding	Sr
TE	82	Julian Johnson	Fr
TE	83	Sam Peters	So
TE	84	Jack DiSano	Jr
TE	86	Jameson Geers	Sr
TE	87	Drew Biber	Sr
TE	88	Jacob Simpson	Fr

Defense

Pos.	#	Name	Class
DL	0	Anthony Smith	Jr
DL	1	Jaxon Howard	So
LB	2	Emmanuel Karmo	Fr
DB	3	Koi Perich	So
DB	4	Za'Quan Bryan	So
DB	5	Jaylen Bowden	Jr
LB	6	Maverick Baranowski	Jr
DB	7	Aidan Gousby	Jr
DL	8	Steven Curtis	Jr
LB	9	Devon Williams	Sr
DL	11	Karter Menz	So
DB	12	Darius Green	Sr
DB	13	Mike Gerald	Fr
DB	14	Kerry Brown	So
DB	15	Samuel Madu	Fr
DL	16	Rushawn Lawrence	GS
DB	17	John Nestor	Jr
DB	18	Rhyland Kelly	Jr
LB	19	Joey Gerlach	Jr
LB	20	Jeff Roberson	GS
DB	21	Naiim Parrish	Fr
DB	22	Evan Redding	Jr
DB	23	Garrison Monroe	So
DB	24	Jai'Onte' McMillan	GS
DB	25	Zahir Rainer	Fr
DB	26	Zack Harden	Fr
DB	27	Simon Seidl	Fr
DB	29	Ethan Carrier	So
LB	30	Drew Wilson	So
DB	33	Harrison Brun	Fr
LB	35	Derik LeCaptain	GS
LB	43	Ethan Stendel	Fr
DL	45	Sam Macy	Fr
DL	46	Lucas Finnessy	GS
DL	47	Enoch Atewogbola	Fr
LB	48	Mason Carrier	Fr
LB	49	Matt Kingsbury	So
DL	50	Mo Omonode	Sr
LB	53	Nate Cleveland	Fr
DL	55	Jaylin Hicks	Fr
DL	56	Jay'Quan Stubbs	Fr
DL	89	Nate Becker	Sr
DL	90	Rhett Hlavacka	Fr
DL	91	Deven Eastern	Sr
DL	93	Riley Sunram	Fr
DL	94	Mo Saine	Fr
DL	95	Colin Hansen	Fr
DL	96	Abu Tarawallie	Fr
DL	97	Jalen Logan-Redding	GS
DL	98	Adam Kissayi	Fr
DL	99	Theorin Randle	So

Special teams

Pos.	#	Name	Class
P	25	Brody Richter	Jr
K	30	Sam Henson	GS
K	36	Daniel Jackson	Fr
P	42	Tom Weston	So
LS	43	Jakob Lutz	Fr
LS	80	Alan Soukup	So
P	91	Luke Ryerse	Fr
K	92	Brady Denaburg	Sr
P	95	Caleb McGrath	So
K	98	David Kemp	Sr

Head coach

- P. J. Fleck

Coordinators/assistant coaches

- Greg Harbaugh Jr. (co-offensive coordinator / quarterbacks)
- Danny Collins (defensive coordinator / safeties)
- Matt Simon (co-offensive coordinator / wide receivers)
- Nick Monroe (co-defensive coordinator / cornerbacks)
- Brian Callahan (run game coordinator / offensive line)
- Eric Koehler (tight ends)
- Jayden Everett (running backs)
- Mariano Sori-Marin (linebackers)
- Dennis Dottin-Carter (defensive line)
- Kevin Kane (nickels / outside linebackers)
- C.J. Robbins (defensive ends)
- Bob Ligashesky (special teams coordinator)
- Keegan O'Hara (assistant quarterbacks)
- Gerrit Chernoff (general manager)
- Dan Nichol (head strength & conditioning)
- Norries Wilson (director of player development)

Legend

- (C) Team captain
- (S) Suspended
- (I) Ineligible
- Injured
- Redshirt

Roster
Last update: October 6, 2025
