= 2025 Buffalo Bulls football team =

American college football season

2025 Buffalo Bulls football
- Conference: Mid-American Conference
- Record: 5–7 (4–4 MAC)
- Head coach: Pete Lembo (2nd season)
- Offensive coordinator: Dave Patenaude (2nd season)
- Offensive scheme: Pro spread
- Defensive coordinator: Joe Bowen (2nd season)
- Base defense: Multiple
- Home stadium: University at Buffalo Stadium

2025 Mid-American Conference football standings
	Conf.			Overall
Team	W		L	W		L
Western Michigan y$	7	–	1	10	–	4
Miami (OH) y	6	–	2	7	–	7
Ohio	6	–	2	9	–	4
Toledo	6	–	2	8	–	5
Central Michigan	5	–	3	7	–	6
Akron*	4	–	4	5	–	7
Buffalo	4	–	4	5	–	7
Kent State	4	–	4	5	–	7
Eastern Michigan	3	–	5	4	–	8
Ball State	3	–	5	4	–	8
Bowling Green	2	–	6	4	–	8
Northern Illinois	2	–	6	3	–	9
UMass	0	–	8	0	–	12
Championship: Western Michigan 23, Miami (OH) 13
$ – Conference champion; y – Championship game participant; * Ineligible for postseason play due to low APR score

The 2025 Buffalo Bulls football team represented the University at Buffalo as a member of the Mid-American Conference (MAC) during the 2025 NCAA Division I FBS football season. Led by second-year head coach Pete Lembo, the Bulls played home games at University at Buffalo Stadium in Amherst, New York.

== Schedule ==
Date	Time	Opponent	Site	TV	Result	Attendance
August 28	8:00 p.m.	at Minnesota*	Huntington Bank Stadium; Minneapolis, MN	FS1	L 10–23	47,774
September 6	3:30 p.m.	Saint Francis (PA)*	University at Buffalo Stadium; Amherst, NY	ESPN+	W 45–6	15,740
September 13	12:00 p.m.	at Kent State	Dix Stadium; Kent, OH	CBSSN	W 31–28	11,833
September 20	3:30 p.m.	Troy*	University at Buffalo Stadium; Amherst, NY	ESPN+	L 17–21	12,068
September 27	3:30 p.m.	UConn*	University at Buffalo Stadium; Amherst, NY	ESPN+	L 17–20	12,717
October 4	3:30 p.m.	Eastern Michigan^{†}	University at Buffalo Stadium; Amherst, NY	ESPN+	W 31–30 ^{OT}	17,300
October 18	2:30 p.m.	at UMass	Warren McGuirk Alumni Stadium; Hadley, MA	ESPN+	W 28–21	15,242
October 25	1:00 p.m.	Akron	University at Buffalo Stadium; Amherst, NY	ESPN+	L 16–24	12,491
November 1	12:00 p.m.	at Bowling Green	Doyt Perry Stadium; Bowling Green, OH	ESPN+	W 28–3	11,876
November 12	7:00 p.m.	at Central Michigan	Kelly/Shorts Stadium; Mount Pleasant, MI	CBSSN	L 19–38	6,833
November 19	7:00 p.m.	Miami (OH)	University at Buffalo Stadium; Amherst, NY	ESPN2	L 20–37	15,246
November 28	12:00 p.m.	Ohio	University at Buffalo Stadium; Amherst, NY	ESPNU	L 26–31	11,096
*Non-conference game; ^{†}Homecoming; All times are in Eastern time

== Preseason ==
The MAC Football Kickoff was held on Thursday, July 24, 2025 at Ford Field in Detroit from 9:00 am EDT to 1:30 pm EDT.

=== Preseason coaches polls ===
On July 24 the MAC announced the preseason coaches poll. Buffalo was picked to finish fourth in the conference.

== Game summaries ==
=== At Minnesota ===
Buffalo Bulls (0–0) at Minnesota Golden Gophers (0–0) – Game summary

Quarter	1	2	3	4	Total
Bulls	0	3	7	0	10
Golden Gophers	0	10	3	10	23

at Huntington Bank Stadium • Minneapolis, Minnesota

- Date: August 28
- Game time: 7:00 p.m.
- Game weather: Sunny • Temperature: 75 °F (24 °C) • Wind: NE at 6 miles per hour (9.7 km/h)
- Game attendance: 47,774
- Referee: Ron Snodgrass
- TV announcers (FS1): Tim Brando, Devin Gardner

Game information

First quarter

- No scoring plays.

Second quarter

- MINN – Jameson Geers 9-yard pass from Drake Lindsey (Brady Denaburg kick), 13:53. Golden Gophers 7–0. Drive: 7 plays, 50 yards, 4:22.
- BUFF – Jack Howes 36-yard field goal, 7:56. Golden Gophers 7–3. Drive: 4 plays, 5 yards, 1:52.
- MINN – Brady Denaburg 38-yard field goal, 0:02. Golden Gophers 10–3. Drive: 11 plays, 50 yards, 1:15.

Third quarter

- MINN – Brady Denaburg 29-yard field goal, 11:39. Golden Gophers 13–3. Drive: 8 plays, 59 yards, 3:18.
- BUFF – Victor Snow 40-yard pass from Ta'Quan Roberson (Jack Howes kick), 6:48. Golden Gophers 13–10. Drive: 9 plays, 75 yards, 4:51.

Fourth quarter

- MINN – Brady Denaburg 25-yard field goal, 11:31. Golden Gophers 16–10. Drive: 11 plays, 46 yards, 5:45.
- MINN – Jalen Smith 60-yard pass from Drake Lindsey (Brady Denaburg kick), 10:52. Golden Gophers 23–10. Drive: 1 play, 60 yards, 0:09.

Statistics	BUFF	MINN
First downs	8	27
Plays–yards	64–151	79–443
Rushes–yards	24–44	44–153
Passing yards	107	290
Passing: comp–att–int	12–20–0	19–35–1
Turnovers	1	1
Time of possession	21:32	38:28

Team	Category	Player	Statistics
Buffalo	Passing	Ta'Quan Roberson	12/20, 107 yards, TD
Buffalo	Rushing	Al-Jay Henderson	11 carries, 25 yards
Buffalo	Receiving	Victor Snow	5 receptions, 67 yards, TD
Minnesota	Passing	Drake Lindsey	19/35, 290 yards, 2 TD, INT
Minnesota	Rushing	Darius Taylor	30 carries, 141 yards
Minnesota	Receiving	Jalen Smith	2 receptions, 76 yards, TD

=== vs Saint Francis (PA) (FCS) ===
Saint Francis (PA) (FCS) Red Flash (0–1) at Buffalo Bulls (0–1) – Game summary

Quarter	1	2	3	4	Total
Red Flash (FCS)	0	0	0	6	6
Bulls	17	7	14	7	45

at University at Buffalo Stadium • Amherst, New York

- Date: September 6, 2025
- Game time: 3:30 PM EDT
- Game attendance: 15,740
- Referee: Marcel Kerr
- TV announcers (ESPN+): Anthony Lima (play-by-play) and Randy Buffington (analyst)

Game information

First quarter

- BUFF – Victor Snow 17-yard pass from Ta'Quan Roberson (Jack Howes kick), 12:20. Bulls 7–0. Drive: 4 plays, 27 yards, 1:45.
- BUFF – Jack Howes 27-yard field goal, 7:01. Bulls 10–0. Drive: 9 plays, 56 yards, 3:39.
- BUFF – Al-Jay Henderson 1-yard run (Jack Howes kick), 0:50. Bulls 17–0. Drive: 12 plays, 56 yards, 5:06.

Second quarter

- BUFF – Al-Jay Henderson 10-yard run (Jack Howes kick), 5:31. Bulls 24–0. Drive: 6 plays, 51 yards, 2:42.

Third quarter

- BUFF – Ta'Quan Roberson 40-yard run (Jack Howes kick), 5:07. Bulls 31–0. Drive: 10 plays, 91 yards, 4:09.
- BUFF – Ta'Quan Roberson 4-yard run (Jack Howes kick), 1:01. Bulls 38–0. Drive: 5 plays, 43 yards, 2:10.

Fourth quarter

- SFPA – Jordan Theodore 1-yard run (Mac Plummer kick failed), 10:06. Bulls 38–6. Drive: 7 plays, 29 yards, 2:45.
- BUFF – James McNeil Jr. 26-yard run (Jack Howes kick), 4:52. Bulls 45–6. Drive: 9 plays, 60 yards, 5:14.

Statistics	SFPA	BUFF
First downs	7	32
Plays–yards	52–119	85–503
Rushes–yards	21–4	63–370
Passing yards	115	133
Passing: Comp–Att–Int	18–31–0	11–22–2
Turnovers	1	2
Time of possession	22:41	37:19

Team	Category	Player	Statistics
Saint Francis (PA)	Passing	Nick Whitfield Jr.	17/27, 111 yards
Saint Francis (PA)	Rushing	Raph Ekechi	8 carries, 21 yards
Saint Francis (PA)	Receiving	Peyton Nelson	4 receptions, 34 yards
Buffalo	Passing	Ta'Quan Roberson	10/20, 133 yards, TD, INT
Buffalo	Rushing	Al-Jay Henderson	24 carries, 98 yards, 2 TD
Buffalo	Receiving	Victor Snow	3 receptions, 67 yards, TD

=== At Kent State ===
Buffalo Bulls (1–1) at Kent State Golden Flashes (1–1) – Game summary

Quarter	1	2	3	4	Total
Bulls	0	10	14	7	31
Golden Flashes	7	7	7	7	28

at Dix Stadium • Kent, Ohio

- Date: September 13
- Game time: 12:00 PM EDT
- Game weather: Sunny • Temperature: 76 °F (24 °C) • Wind: N at 1 mile per hour (1.6 km/h)
- Game attendance: 11,833
- Referee: Chris LaMange
- TV announcers (CBSSN): Jordan Kent (play-by-play) and Randy Cross (analyst)

Game information

First quarter

- (8:54) KENT – Maurice Stephens 31-yard run, Will Hryszko kick (Drive: 3 plays, 61 yards, 1:29; KENT 7-0)

Second quarter

- (2:33) KENT – Cade Wolford 41-yard pass from Dru DeShields, Will Hryszko kick (Drive: 4 Plays, 71 yards, 1:49; KENT 14-0)
- (1:12) BUFF – Nik McMillan 38-yard pass from Ta'Quan Roberson, Jack Howes kick (Drive: 7 plays, 92 yards, 1:18; KENT 14-7)
- (0:00) BUFF – Jack Howes 28-yard field goal (Drive: 8 plays, 50 yards, 0:49; KENT 14-10)

Third quarter

- (9:28) BUFF – Chance Morrow 21-yard pass from Ta'Quan Roberson, Jack Howes kick (Drive: 4 plays, 51 yards, 1:01; BUFF 17-14)
- (5:18) BUFF – Al-Jay Henderson 38-yard run, Jack Howes kick (Drive: 6 plays, 85 yards, 2:16; BUFF 24-14)
- (2:58) KENT – Terik Mulder 50-yard pass from Dru DeShields, Will Hryszko kick (Drive: 4 plays, 75 yards, 2:17; BUFF 24-21)

Fourth quarter

- (2:38) KENT – Dru DeShields 3-yard run, Will Hryszko kick (Drive: 21 plays, 93 yards, 12:15; KENT 28-24)
- (1:03) BUFF – Victor Snow 22-yard pass from Ta'Quan Roberson, Jack Howes kick (Drive: 8 plays, 76 yards, 1:29; BUFF 31-28)

Statistics	BUFF	KENT
First downs	23	20
Plays–yards	69–457	77–423
Rushes–yards	29–139	44–144
Passing yards	318	279
Passing: Comp–Att–Int	28–40–1	22-33–0
Turnovers	2	1
Time of possession	22:38	37:22

Team	Category	Player	Statistics
Buffalo	Passing	Ta'Quan Roberson	28/40, 318 yards, 3 TD, INT
Buffalo	Rushing	Al-Jay Henderson	15 carries, 75 yards, TD
Buffalo	Receiving	Nik McMillan	7 receptions, 117 yards, TD
Kent State	Passing	Dru DeShields	22/33, 279 yards, 2 TD
Kent State	Rushing	Gavin Garcia	18 carries, 61 yards
Kent State	Receiving	Cade Wolford	3 receptions, 95 yards, TD

=== Troy ===
Troy Trojans (1–2) at Buffalo Bulls (2–1) – Game summary

Quarter	1	2	3	4	Total
Trojans	0	0	0	21	21
Bulls	7	0	7	3	17

at University at Buffalo Stadium • Amherst, New York

- Date: September 20
- Game time: 3:30 p.m. EDT
- Game weather: Sunny • Temperature: 73 °F (23 °C) • Wind: E at 12 miles per hour (19 km/h)
- Game attendance: 12,068
- Referee: Rick Wayne
- TV announcers (ESPN+): Michael Reghi (play-by-play) and Je'Rod Cherry (analyst)

Game information

First quarter

- (6:31) BUFF – James McNeil Jr. 1-yard run, Jack Howes kick (Drive: 7 plays, 71 yards, 3:25; Buffalo 7–0)

Second quarter

- No scoring plays.

Third quarter

- (9:12) BUFF – Al-Jay Henderson 22-yard run, Jack Howes kick (Drive: 6 plays, 53 yards, 2:41; Buffalo 14–0)

Fourth quarter

- (14:56) BUFF – Jack Howes 39-yard field goal (Drive: 14 plays, 51 yards, 6:28; Buffalo 17–0)
- (10:23) TROY – Tucker Kilcrease 6-yard run, Scott Taylor Renfroe kick (Drive: 14 plays, 75 yards, 4:33; Buffalo 17–7)
- (5:45) TROY – RaRa Thomas 10-yard pass from Tucker Kilcrease, Scott Taylor Renfroe kick (Drive: 7 plays, 66 yards, 2:34; Buffalo 17–14)
- (0:45) TROY – Tae Meadows 20-yard run, Scott Taylor Renfroe kick (Drive: 9 plays, 50 yards, 1:48; Troy 21–17)

Statistics	TROY	BUFF
First downs	22	14
Plays–yards	83–365	62–278
Rushes–yards	47–163	34–125
Passing yards	202	153
Passing: Comp–Att–Int	19–36–1	14–28–0
Turnovers	2	0
Time of possession	32:52	27:08

Team	Category	Player	Statistics
Troy	Passing	Tucker Kilcrease	14/24, 148 yards, TD
Troy	Rushing	Tae Meadows	14 carries, 68 yards, TD
Troy	Receiving	RaRa Thomas	5 receptions, 78 yards, TD
Buffalo	Passing	Ta'Quan Roberson	9/15, 104 yards
Buffalo	Rushing	Al-Jay Henderson	22 carries, 76 yards, TD
Buffalo	Receiving	Jasaiah Gathings	2 receptions, 47 yards

=== UConn ===
UConn Huskies (2–2) at Buffalo Bulls (2–2) – Game summary

Quarter	1	2	3	4	Total
Huskies	0	7	10	3	20
Bulls	0	7	3	7	17

at University at Buffalo Stadium • Amherst, New York

- Date: September 27
- Game time: 3:30 p.m. EDT
- Game weather: Sunny • Temperature: 76 °F (24 °C) • Wind: NE at 7 miles per hour (11 km/h)
- Game attendance: 12,717
- Referee: Matt Packowski
- TV announcers (ESPN+): James Westling (play-by-play) and Craig Haubert (analyst)

Game information

First quarter

- No scoring plays.

Second quarter

- CONN - Skyler Bell 25-yard pass from Joe Fagnano (Chris Freeman kick), 8:36. Huskies 7–0. Drive: 10 plays, 93 yards, 05:12.
- BUFF - Lamar Sperling 63-yard run (Jack Howes kick), 6:21. Tied 7–7. Drive: 5 plays, 75 yards, 02:15.

Third quarter

- CONN - Cam Edwards 8-yard run (Chris Freeman kick), 11:16. Huskies 14–7. Drive: 8 plays, 75 yards, 03:36.
- BUFF - Jack Howes 39-yard field goal, 4:58. Huskies 14–10. Drive: 12 plays, 54 yards, 06:18.
- CONN - Chris Freeman 39-yard field goal, 1:31. Huskies 17–10. Drive: 9 plays, 49 yards, 03:21.

Fourth quarter

- BUFF - Al-Jay Henderson 5-yard pass from Gunnar Gray (Jack Howes kick), 0:59. Tied 17–17. Drive: 9 plays, 57 yards, 02:53.
- CONN - Chris Freeman 44-yard field goal, 0:06. Huskies 20–17. Drive: 10 plays, 49 yards, 00:53.

Statistics	CONN	BUFF
First downs	17	17
Plays–yards	63–320	71–329
Rushes–yards	31–165	42–204
Passing yards	155	125
Passing: Comp–Att–Int	19-32-0	17-29-0
Turnovers	0	0
Time of possession	26:10	33:50

Team	Category	Player	Statistics
UConn	Passing	Joe Fagnano	19/31, 155 yards, TD
UConn	Rushing	Joe Fagnano	6 carries, 64 yards
UConn	Receiving	Skyler Bell	6 receptions, 54 yards, TD
Buffalo	Passing	Gunnar Gray	17/29, 125 yards, TD
Buffalo	Rushing	Lamar Sperling	9 carries, 106 yards, TD
Buffalo	Receiving	Victor Snow	7 receptions, 68 yards

=== Eastern Michigan ===
Eastern Michigan Eagles (1–4) at Buffalo Bulls (2–3) – Game summary

Quarter	1	2	3	4	OT	Total
Eagles	7	7	7	3	6	30
Bulls	7	7	7	3	7	31

at University at Buffalo Stadium • Amherst, New York

- Date: October 4
- Game time: 3:30 p.m. EDT
- Game weather: Sunny • Temperature: 79 °F (26 °C) • Wind: SW at 6 miles per hour (9.7 km/h)
- Game attendance: 17,300
- Referee: Andrew Speciale
- TV announcers (ESPN+): Shawn Kenney (play-by-play) and Marcus Ray (analyst)

Game information

First quarter

- (8:50) EMU – Nick Devereaux 45-yard pass from Noah Kim, Rudy Kessinger kick (Drive: 8 plays, 99 yards, 3:53; Eastern Michigan 7-0)
- (8:39) BUFF – Victor Snow 75-yard pass from Ta'Quan Roberson, Jack Howes kick (Drive: 1 play, 75 yards, 0:11; 7-7)

Second quarter

- (8:44) EMU – Dontae McMillan 3-yard run, Rudy Kessinger kick (Drive: 17 plays, 94 yards, 7:07; Eastern Michigan 14-7)
- (1:51) BUFF – Patrick Clacks III 7-yard pass from Ta'Quan Roberson, Jack Howes kick (Drive: 15 plays, 75 yards, 6:53; 14-14)

Third quarter

- (3:11) EMU – Dontae McMillan 38-yard pass from Noah Kim, Rudy Kessinger kick (Drive: 10 plays, 96 yards, 5:14; Eastern Michigan 21-14)
- (0:02) BUFF – Victor Snow 19-yard pass from Ta'Quan Roberson, Jack Howes kick (Drive: 8 plays, 75 yards, 3:09; 21-21)

Fourth quarter

- (8:59) EMU – Rudy Kessinger 42-yard field goal (Drive: 4 plays, -18 yards, 1:31; Eastern Michigan 24-21)
- (0:00) BUFF – Jack Howes 50-yard field goal (Drive: 11 plays, 59 yards, 0:58; 24-24)

Overtime

- BUFF – Victor Snow 9-yard run, Jack Howes kick (Drive: 3 play, 25 yards Buffalo 31-24)
- EMU – Noah Kim 1-yard run, two-point run conversion failed (Drive: 3 plays, 25 yards Buffalo 31-30)

Statistics	EMU	BUFF
First downs	25	21
Plays–yards	85–395	70–387
Rushes–yards	54–227	31–115
Passing yards	168	272
Passing: Comp–Att–Int	19–31–0	19–39–0
Turnovers	0	1
Time of possession	37:05	22:55

Team	Category	Player	Statistics
Eastern Michigan	Passing	Noah Kim	19/31, 168 yards, 2 TD
Eastern Michigan	Rushing	Dontae McMillan	20 carries, 117 yards, TD
Eastern Michigan	Receiving	Nick Devereaux	3 receptions, 62 yards, TD
Buffalo	Passing	Ta'Quan Roberson	19/38, 272 yards, 3 TD
Buffalo	Rushing	Al-Jay Henderson	16 carries, 81 yards
Buffalo	Receiving	Victor Snow	6 receptions, 136 yards, 2 TD

=== At UMass ===
Buffalo Bulls (3–3) at UMass Minutemen (0–6) – Game summary

Quarter	1	2	3	4	Total
Bulls	3	7	10	8	28
Minutemen	0	14	7	0	21

at Warren McGuirk Alumni Stadium • Hadley, Massachusetts

- Date: October 18
- Game time: 2:30 p.m. EDT
- Game weather: Sunny • Temperature: 62 °F (17 °C)
- Game attendance: 15,242
- Referee: Marcel Kerr
- TV announcers (ESPN+): Cooper Boardman (play-by-play) and Forrest Conoly (analyst)

Game information

First quarter

- BUFF – Jack Howes 23-yard field goal, 4:39. Bulls 3–0. Drive: 10 plays, 85 yards, 3:52.

Second quarter

- MASS – Kezion Dia-Johnson 27-yard pass from AJ Hairston (Derek Morris kick), 9:44. Minutemen 7–3. Drive: 7 plays, 87 yards, 3:14.
- MASS – Brandon Hood 90-yard run (Derek Morris kick), 4:12. Minutemen 14–3. Drive: 1 play, 90 yards, 0:13.
- BUFF – Victor Snow 23-yard pass from Ta'Quan Roberson (Jack Howes kick), 2:55. Minutemen 14–10. Drive: 5 plays, 75 yards, 1:17.

Third quarter

- BUFF – Terrance Shelton Jr. 1-yard run (Jack Howes kick), 7:02. Bulls 17–14. Drive: 14 plays, 76 yards, 5:53.
- MASS – Max Dowling 77-yard pass from AJ Hairston (Derek Morris kick), 5:37. Minutemen 21–17. Drive: 3 plays, 75 yards, 1:25.
- BUFF – Jack Howes 47-yard field goal, 0:18. Minutemen 21–20. Drive: 9 plays, 28 yards, 3:12.

Fourth quarter

- BUFF – Victor Snow 16-yard pass from Ta'Quan Roberson (Ta'Quan Roberson pass to Nik McMillan), 0:19. Bulls 28–21. Drive: 4 plays, 50 yards, 0:22.

Statistics	BUFF	MASS
First downs	29	11
Plays–yards	85–475	58–306
Rushes–yards	30–72	44–187
Passing yards	403	119
Passing: Comp–Att–Int	36–55–1	6–14–0
Turnovers	1	0
Time of possession	34:20	25:40

Team	Category	Player	Statistics
Buffalo	Passing	Ta'Quan Roberson	36/55, 403 yards, 2 TD, INT
Buffalo	Rushing	Al-Jay Henderson	20 carries, 59 yards
Buffalo	Receiving	Nick McMillan	10 receptions, 119 yards
UMass	Passing	AJ Hairston	6/14, 119 yards, 2 TD
UMass	Rushing	Brandon Hood	24 carries, 174 yards, TD
UMass	Receiving	Max Dowling	1 reception, 77 yards, TD

=== Akron ===
Akron Zips (2–6) at Buffalo Bulls (4–3) – Game summary

Quarter	1	2	3	4	Total
Zips	3	0	14	7	24
Bulls	2	8	3	3	16

at UB Stadium • Amherst, New York

- Date: October 25
- Game time: 1:00 p.m. EDT
- Game weather: Sunny, 50 degrees
- Game attendance: 12,491
- Referee: Rich Edwards
- TV announcers (ESPN+): Shawn Kenney (play-by-play) and Ryan Cavanaugh (analyst)

Game information

First quarter

- AKR – Matthew Schramm 44-yard field goal, 9:37. Zips 3–0. Drive: 10 plays, 46 yards, 2:38.
- BUFF – Jonathan Capo Safety, 3:44. Zips 3–2.

Second quarter

- BUFF – Patrick Clacks III 1-yard pass from Ta'Quan Roberson (Ta'Quan Roberson–Marcus Velez pass), 0:09. Bulls 10–3. Drive: 1 play, 16 yards, 0:12.

Third quarter

- AKR – Kyan Mason 9-yard pass from Ben Finley (Matthew Schramm kick), 10:57. Tied 10–10. Drive: 12 plays, 75 yards, 4:03.
- BUFF – Jack Howes 21-yard field goal, 7:17. Bulls 13–10. Drive: 7 plays, 63 yards, 3:36.
- AKR – Conner Cravaack 5-yard pass from Ben Finley (Matthew Schramm kick), 4:54. Zips 17–13. Drive: 5 plays, 75 yards, 2:23.

Fourth quarter

- AKR – Ben Finley 38-yard run (Matthew Schramm kick), 11:46. Zips 24–13. Drive: 7 plays, 82 yards, 3:57.
- BUFF – Jack Howes 35-yard field goal, 6:04. Zips 24–16. Drive: 8 plays, 70 yards, 2:18.

Statistics	AKR	BUFF
First downs	18	19
Plays–yards	73–325	70–357
Rushes–yards	41–95	34–91
Passing yards	230	266
Passing: Comp–Att–Int	17–32–1	23–36–4
Turnovers	3	5
Time of possession	30:22	29:38

Team	Category	Player	Statistics
Akron	Passing	Ben Finley	17/32, 230 yards, 2 TD, INT
Akron	Rushing	Jordan Gant	25 carries, 92 yards
Akron	Receiving	Marcel Williams	6 receptions, 74 yards
Buffalo	Passing	Ta'Quan Roberson	23/36, 266 yards, TD, 4 INT
Buffalo	Rushing	Al-Jay Henderson	11 carries, 67 yards
Buffalo	Receiving	Nik McMillan	8 receptions, 177 yards

=== At Bowling Green ===
Buffalo Bulls (4–4) at Bowling Green Falcons (3–5) – Game summary

Quarter	1	2	3	4	Total
Bulls	7	14	7	0	28
Falcons	0	0	0	3	3

at Doyt Perry Stadium • Bowling Green, Ohio

- Date: November 1
- Game time: 12:00 p.m. EDT
- Game weather: Cloudy • Temperature: 51 °F (11 °C) • Wind: W at 9 miles per hour (14 km/h)
- Game attendance: 11,876
- Referee: Matt Packowski
- TV announcers (ESPN+): Shawn Kenney (play-by-play) and Marcus Ray (analyst)

Game information

First quarter

- BUFF – Al-Jay Henderson 41-yard run (Jack Howes kick), 13:57. Bulls 7–0. Drive: 3 plays, 74 yards, 0:55.

Second quarter

- BUFF – Victor Snow 2-yard run (Jack Howes kick), 14:54. Bulls 14–0. Drive: 6 plays, 64 yards, 3:05.
- BUFF – Jasaiah Gathings 5-yard pass from Ta'Quan Roberson (Jack Howes kick), 0:09. Bulls 21–0. Drive: 3 plays, 6 yards, 1:01.

Third quarter

- BUFF – Victor Snow 65-yard punt return (Jack Howes kick), 13:25. Bulls 28–0.

Fourth quarter

- BGSU – Jackson Kleather 51-yard field goal, 8:33. Bulls 28–3. Drive: 9 plays, 43 yards, 3:31.

Statistics	BUFF	BGSU
First downs	10	15
Plays–yards	51–282	72–216
Rushes–yards	27–146	44–116
Passing yards	136	100
Passing: Comp–Att–Int	13–24–1	11–28–1
Turnovers	1	2
Time of possession	26:00	34:00

Team	Category	Player	Statistics
Buffalo	Passing	Ta'Quan Roberson	13/24, 136 yards, TD, INT
Buffalo	Rushing	Al-Jay Henderson	18 carries, 119 yards, TD
Buffalo	Receiving	Nik McMillan	8 receptions, 105 yards
Bowling Green	Passing	Drew Pyne	7/16, 52 yards
Bowling Green	Rushing	Austyn Dendy	18 carries, 62 yards
Bowling Green	Receiving	Jyrin Johnson	5 receptions, 69 yards

=== At Central Michigan ===
Buffalo Bulls (5–4) at Central Michigan Chippewas (5–4) – Game summary

Quarter	1	2	3	4	Total
Bulls	3	7	3	6	19
Chippewas	7	7	10	14	38

at Kelly/Shorts Stadium • Mount Pleasant, Michigan

- Date: November 12
- Game time: 7:00 PM EST
- Game weather: Clear • Temperature: 40 °F (4 °C) • Wind: W at 15 miles per hour (24 km/h)
- Game attendance: 6,833
- Referee: Chris La Mange
- TV announcers (CBSSN): Dave Ryan (play-by-play) and Adam Breneman (analyst)

Game information

First quarter

- (11:41) BUFF – Jack Howes 29-yard field goal (Drive: 4 plays, -2 yards, 0:45; Buffalo 3-0)
- (3:47) CMU – Jordan Kwiatkowski 48-yard interception return, Cade Graham kick (Drive: 5 plays, 43 yards, 2:40; Central Michigan 7-3)

Second quarter

- (2:22) BUFF – Nik McMillan 55-yard pass from Ta'Quan Roberson, Jack Howes kick (Drive: 4 plays, 87 yards, 1:22; Buffalo 10-7)
- (0:48) CMU – Marcus Beamon 1-yard run, Cade Graham kick (Drive: 8 plays, 71 yards, 1:29; Central Michigan 14-10)

Third quarter

- (9:17) CMU – Cade Graham 32-yard field goal (Drive: 7 plays, 45 yards, 3:59; Central Michigan 17-10)
- (4:30) BUFF – Jack Howes 42-yard field goal (Drive: 9 plays, 53 yards, 4:40; Central Michigan 17-13)
- (4:18) CMU – Langston Lewis 75-yard pass from Joe Labas, Cade Graham kick (Drive: 1 play, 75 yards, 0:12; Central Michigan 24-13)

Fourth quarter

- (10:38) CMU – Dakota Cochran 85-yard fumble return, Cade Graham kick (Drive: 1 play, -3 yards, 0:10; Central Michigan 31-13)
- (6:36) CMU – Tommy McIntosh 10-yard pass from Joe Labas, Cade Graham kick (Drive: 6 plays, 41 yards, 3:03; Central Michigan 38-13)
- (1:58) BUFF – Nik McMillan 26-yard pass from Gunnar Gray, two-point pass conversion failed (Drive: 13 plays, 75 yards, 4:38; Central Michigan 38-19)

Statistics	BUFF	CMU
First downs	19	17
Plays–yards	76–398	59–358
Rushes–yards	34–136	34–111
Passing yards	262	247
Passing: Comp–Att–Int	22–42–2	18–25–2
Turnovers	5	2
Time of possession	28:54	31:06

Team	Category	Player	Statistics
Buffalo	Passing	Ta'Quan Roberson	16/33, 208 yards, TD, INT
Buffalo	Rushing	Terrance Shelton Jr.	11 carries, 59 yards
Buffalo	Receiving	Nik McMillan	7 receptions, 122 yards, 2 TD
Central Michigan	Passing	Joe Labas	18/24, 247 yards, 2 TD, 2 INT
Central Michigan	Rushing	Trey Cornist	10 carries, 62 yards
Central Michigan	Receiving	Langston Lewis	6 receptions, 118 yards, TD

=== Miami (OH) ===
Miami RedHawks (5–5) at Buffalo Bulls (5–5) – Game summary

Quarter	1	2	3	4	Total
RedHawks	0	17	14	6	37
Bulls	3	7	10	0	20

at University at Buffalo Stadium • Amherst, New York

- Date: November 19
- Game time: 7:00 PM EST
- Game weather: Clear • Temperature: 35 °F (2 °C) • Wind: NNE at 5 miles per hour (8.0 km/h)
- Game attendance: 15,246
- Referee: Rich Edwards
- TV announcers (ESPN2): Matt Schumacker (play-by-play) and Dustin Fox (analyst)

Game information

First quarter

- (0:56) BUFF – Jack Howes 33-yard field goal (Drive: 13 plays, 77 yards, 6:49; Buffalo 3-0)

Second quarter

- (13:42) M-OH – Kam Perry 32-yard pass from Thomas Gotkowski, Dom Dzioban kick (Drive: 5 plays, 75 yards, 2:14; Miami (OH) 7-3)
- (3:16) M-OH – Thomas Gotkowski 3-yard run, Dom Dzioban kick (Drive: 7 plays, 62 yards, 3:14; Miami (OH) 14-3)
- (1:51) M-OH – Dom Dzioban 42-yard field goal (Drive: 4 plays, -3 yards, 1:20; Miami (OH) 17-3)
- (0:13) BUFF – Victor Snow 9-yard pass from Ta'Quan Roberson, Jack Howes kick (Drive: 10 plays, 75 yards, 1:38; Miami (OH) 17-10)

Third quarter

- (12:31) BUFF – Jasaiah Gathings 10-yard pass from Ta'Quan Roberson, Jack Howes kick (Drive: 6 plays, 75 yards, 2:29; 17-17)
- (6:50) BUFF – Jack Howes 47-yard field goal (Drive: 8 plays, 30 yards, 3:34; Buffalo 20-17)
- (5:32) M-OH – D'Shawntae Jones 7-yard run, Dom Dzioban kick (Drive: 3 plays, 75 yards, 1:18; Miami (OH) 24-20)
- (0:34) M-OH – D'Shawntae Jones 1-yard run, Dom Dzioban kick (Drive: 2 plays, 27 yards, 0:37; Miami (OH) 31-20)

Fourth quarter

- (8:04) M-OH – Dom Dzioban 37-yard field goal (Drive: 7 plays, 25 yards, 3:30; Miami (OH) 34-20)
- (3:44) M-OH – Dom Dzioban 49-yard field goal (Drive: 6 plays, 11 yards, 1:52; Miami (OH) 37-20)

Statistics	M-OH	BUFF
First downs	16	21
Plays–yards	66–347	81–349
Rushes–yards	41–162	33–46
Passing yards	185	303
Passing: Comp–Att–Int	13-25-0	24-48-2
Turnovers	0	3
Time of possession	29:25	30:35

Team	Category	Player	Statistics
Miami (OH)	Passing	Thomas Gotkowski	13/23, 185 yards, TD
Miami (OH)	Rushing	Jordan Brunson	16 carries, 123 yards
Miami (OH)	Receiving	Cole Weaver	5 receptions, 82 yards
Buffalo	Passing	Ta'Quan Roberson	24/48, 303 yards, 2 TD, 2 INT
Buffalo	Rushing	Terrance Shelton Jr.	8 carries, 27 yards
Buffalo	Receiving	Nik McMillan	8 receptions, 147 yards

=== Ohio ===
Ohio Bobcats (7–4) at Buffalo Bulls (5–6) – Game summary

Quarter	1	2	3	4	Total
Bulls	7	14	7	3	31
Bobcats	0	7	6	13	26

at University at Buffalo Stadium • Amherst, New York

- Date: November 28
- Game time: 12:00 PM EST
- Game weather: Temperature:32 °F (0 °C), Wind: W 17 mph (27 km/h)
- Game attendance: 11,096
- Referee: William Williams (MAC)
- TV announcers (ESPNU): Shawn Kenney (play-by-play) and Ryan Cavanaugh (analyst)

Game information

First quarter

- (08:02) OHIO – Mason Williams 11-yard pass from Parker Navarro (David Dellenbach kick), 7 plays, 52 yards, 3:47; OHIO 7–0

Second quarter

- (12:16) BUFF – Chance Morrow 10-yard pass from Ta'Quan Roberson (Jack Howes kick), 2 plays, 11 yards, 0:39; Tied 7–7
- (10:01) OHIO – Sieh Bangura 1-yard run (David Dellenbach kick), 6 plays, 64 yards, 2:09; OHIO 14–7
- (03:43) OHIO – Chase Hendricks 15-yard pass from Parker Navarro (David Dellenbach kick), 10 plays, 86 yards, 5:18; OHIO 21–7

Third quarter

- (12:39) BUFF – Al-Jay Henderson 23-yard run (pass failed), 6 plays, 64 yards, 2:09; OHIO 21–13
- (08:25) OHIO – Parker Navarro 6-yard run (David Dellenbach kick), 9 plays, 61 yards, 4:08; OHIO 28–13

Fourth quarter

- (14:07) BUFF – Ta'Quan Roberson 5-yard run (pass failed), 6 plays, 80 yards, 0:53; OHIO 28–19
- (05:24) OHIO – David Dellenbach 33-yard field goal, 7 plays, 17 yards, 1:46; OHIO 31–19
- (03:47) BUFF – Jasaiah Gathings 29-yard pass from Ta'Quan Roberson (Jack Howes kick), 5 plays, 67 yards, 1:37; OHIO 31–26

Statistics	OHIO	BUFF
First downs	27	19
Plays–yards	77–506	60–370
Rushes–yards	54–359	32–100
Passing yards	147	270
Passing: Comp–Att–Int	10–23–1	16–28–1
Turnovers	3	1
Time of possession	38:04	21:56

Team	Category	Player	Statistics
Ohio	Passing	Parker Navarro	10/23, 147 yards, 2 TD, INT
Ohio	Rushing	Parker Navarro	18 carries, 134 yards, TD
Ohio	Receiving	Chase Hendricks	5 reception, 92 yards, TD
Buffalo	Passing	Ta'Quan Roberson	16/27, 270 yards, 2 TD, INT
Buffalo	Rushing	Terrance Shelton, Jr.	14 carries, 57 yards
Buffalo	Receiving	Nik McMillian	5 reception, 122 yards
