= Marist High School (Chicago) =

Private Catholic high school in the United States

Location
- 4200 West 115th Street; Chicago, Illinois 60655; United States; 41°41′6″N 87°43′28″W

Information
- Type: Private, Coeducational
- Motto: Education for Time and Eternity
- Religious affiliation: Roman Catholic
- Established: 1963
- Oversight: Archdiocese of Chicago
- President: Larry Tucker
- Principal: Meg Dunneback
- Teaching staff: 119
- Grades: 9–12
- Enrollment: 1,647 (2018–19)
- Student to teacher ratio: 19:1
- Campus size: 55 acres (22 ha)
- Campus type: Urban
- Colors: Red, White and Black
- Athletics conference: Chicago Catholic League, Girls Catholic Athletic Conference
- Mascot: Redhawk
- Team name: RedHawks
- Accreditation: AdvancED
- Newspaper: The Sentinel
- Yearbook: The Lantern
- Tuition: US$16,400
- Affiliation: Marist Brothers
- Website: www.marist.net

Marist High School is a private Catholic preparatory high school located in the Mount Greenwood neighborhood of Chicago, Illinois, operated by the Marist Brothers on behalf of the Archdiocese of Chicago. Founded in 1963 as an all-male institution, the school became co-ed in 2002 and today educates over 1,700 young students each year.

== History ==
In the early 1960s, the Christian Brothers of Ireland were asked by Cardinal Albert Gregory Meyer to operate an all-male high school on the far southwest side of Chicago, on land surrounded by St. Casimir Lithuanian Cemetery at the corner of 115th Street and Pulaski Road. With three area schools already under their purview (Leo Catholic High School, Brother Rice High School, and St. Laurence High School) the Christian Brothers declined, and shortly thereafter the Marist Brothers were asked to operate the school instead. Marist opened on September 9, 1963, with 323 young men enrolled in the charter class.

In the mid-1990s, the Marist community decided to begin a transition from the school's original mascot and nickname, Redskins, to a less controversial one. RedHawks was chosen as the new mascot and nickname before the start the 1997–98 school year. This also caused several minor changes in student life, for example renaming the yearbook from Plainsman to The Lantern.

The school remained an all-male institution until the 2002–03 school year, when girls were admitted for the first time.

== Academics ==
Like many Catholic high schools, students are required to take four years of coursework in religious studies. In their fourth year, students may opt out of traditional coursework and fulfill their graduation requirement through work in community service or in peer leadership. In community service, students are assigned to travel off campus to work at a hospital, a work community for adults with developmental disabilities, a grammar school, or other such environment. Peer leadership offers seniors the opportunity to work within a classroom aiding teachers and other students.

Seventeen different AP classes are offered in: English Language and Composition, English Literature and Composition, Calculus (both AB and BC), Biology, Chemistry, Physics (C), U.S. History, European History, U.S. Government and Politics, Psychology, Computer Science (A), Art History, Studio Art, French Language and Spanish Language.

== Athletics ==
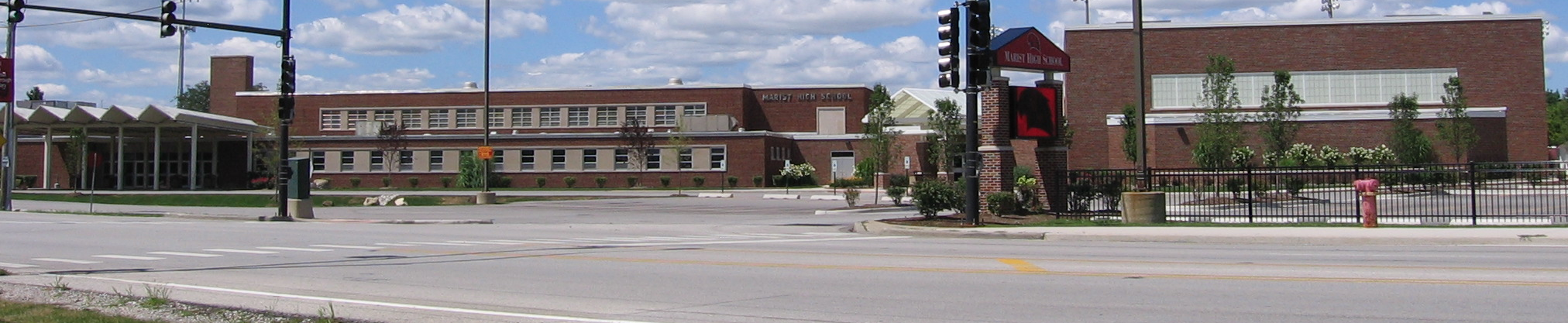
The east part of the building is mostly gymnasiums and other athletic facilities.

Marist sponsors the following sports for both boys and girls, all of which are governed by the Illinois High School Association (IHSA): basketball, bowling, cross country, golf, soccer, track & field, volleyball, and lacrosse. Boys compete in baseball, football, and wrestling. Girls compete in poms, cheerleading, softball, and swimming

Marist also sponsors boxing and ice hockey, though these teams do not compete in state series sponsored by the IHSA.

Marist competes in the Chicago Catholic League (CCL) and Girls Catholic Athletic Conference (GCAC). Marist also competes in the largest school classes of the state series sponsored by the IHSA. Marist has won the following IHSA sponsored state championship series:

- Baseball: 1977–78
- Basketball (boys): 2025-2026
- Competitive Cheerleading: 2023-24, 2024–25
- Softball: 2011–12, 2014–15, 2020–21, 2022-23
- Volleyball (boys): 2001–02, 2009–10, 2018–19, 2023–24, 2024–25
- Volleyball (girls): 2017–18, 2018–19, 2024–25, 2025–26
- Wrestling: 1982–83, 1986–87

The varsity wrestling team won twenty-seven consecutive varsity conference titles dating from the 1980–81 season through the 2006–07 season. The school claims this to be an American high school record.

While not sanctioned by the IHSA, Marist won the Kennedy Cup, the oldest hockey prize in Illinois high school hockey, as a part of their Chicago Catholic Hockey League Championships in 1991, 1994 and 1995.

== Activities ==
=== Band ===
The Marist band is somewhat unusual in that it is not only an extracurricular activity, but also an Honors academic class. The band functions as a marching band generally in the autumn (performing pregame, halftime, and postgame shows at home football games), and as a concert band for the remainder of the year (highlighted by Christmas and Spring Concerts). The general exceptions are their annual performances in the Chicago Columbus Day Parade, the Chicago Thanksgiving Day Parade, and the Chicago St. Patrick's Day parades.

The band is generally not a competition band, but has been successful enough to perform on The Tonight Show with Jay Leno and to be the featured marching band to open the new Comiskey Park in 1991.

The Marist band has won numerous honors and awards, and has traveled across the country to perform in parades and shows such as the Tournament of Roses Parade, the Indianapolis 500 Festival Parade, the Sugar Bowl, the Orange Bowl, the Cotton Bowl, the Peach Bowl, the New York City St. Patrick's Day parade and many other events. The Marist marching band were grand national field show champions out of 10 bands at the 2011 Chick-fil-A bowl competition, with a score of 93 and a gold rating.

== Notable alumni ==
- Sydney Affolter - college basketball player, class of 2021
- Chetan Ahimsa - Kannada film actor and activist
- Robert A. Clifford - trial attorney, class of 1969
- Pat Coogan – college football player, class of 2021
- Christopher Denham - actor (Argo, Shutter Island), class of 1998
- Dan Donegan - Disturbed guitarist, class of 1986
- Tom Gorzelanny - New York Mets pitcher, class of 2000
- Dave Gust - NHL player for Chicago Blackhawks class of 2012
- Mike Hagerty - actor
- Bob Janecyk - NHL goalie, Chicago Blackhawks and Los Angeles Kings, class of 1975
- John Nestor - college football cornerback for the Minnesota Golden Gophers
- Patrick O'Malley - former Illinois State Senator and gubernatorial candidate 2002
- Michael Peña - actor (The Martian, Ant-Man)
- Tim Pyznarski - MLB player (San Diego Padres)
- Bill Risley - MLB pitcher (Montreal Expos, Seattle Mariners, Toronto Blue Jays), class of 1985
- Jimmy Rolder – college football player, class of 2022
- Jesse Ruiz - lawyer and politician, Deputy Governor of Illinois, former chairman of the Illinois State Board of Education, President of the Chicago Park District Board of Commissioners, interim CEO of Chicago Public Schools
- Marty Sammon - blues keyboardist for Buddy Guy, Otis Rush and others, class of 1995
- Carnell Tate - football player, attended 2019-2020
- James Tyree - CEO and chairman at Mesirow Financial, class of 1975
