= Drake Lindsey =

American football player (born 2005)

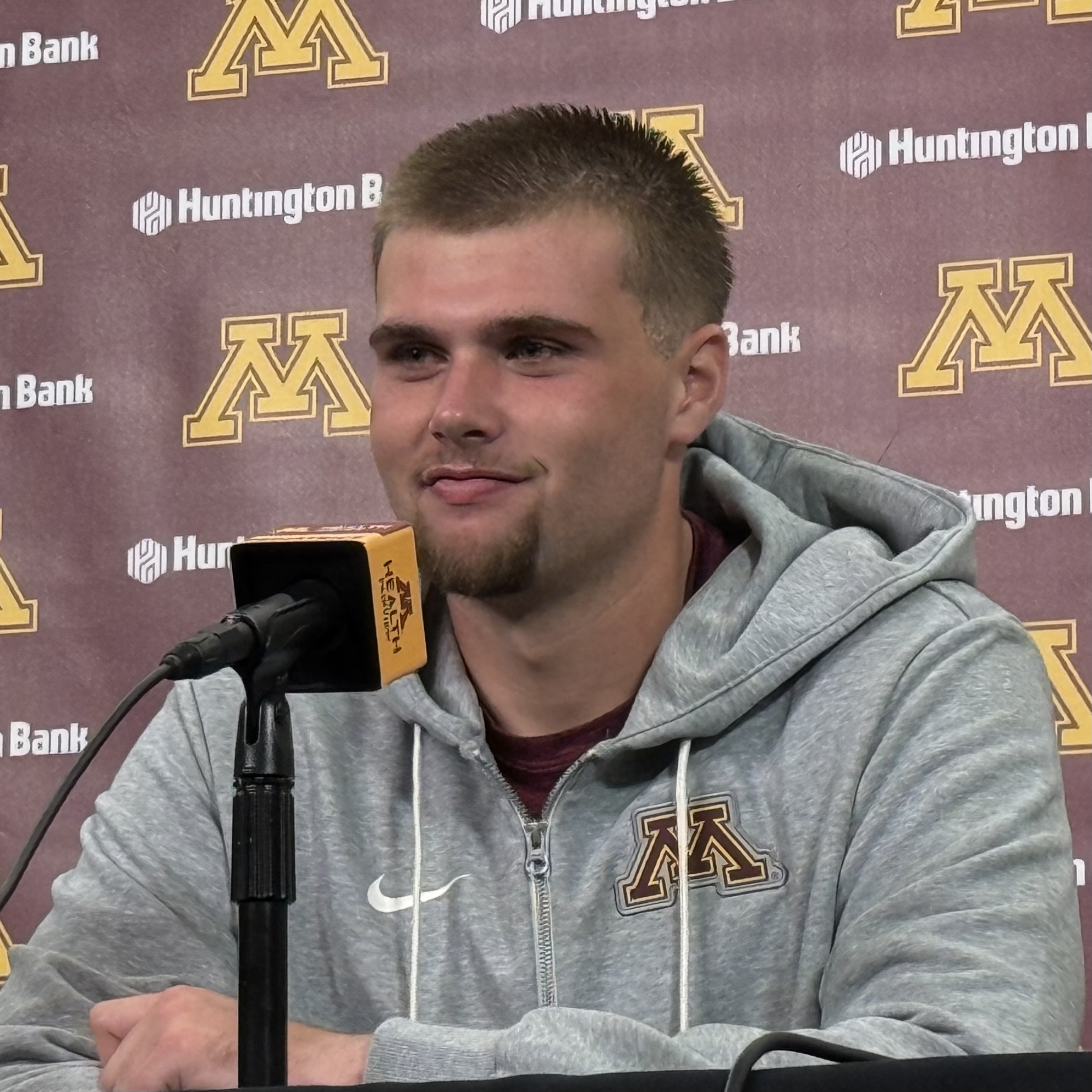
- Lindsey in 2025

No. 5 – Minnesota Golden Gophers
- Position: Quarterback
- Class: Redshirt Sophomore

Personal information
- Born: August 18, 2005 (age 21)
- Listed height: 6 ft 5 in (1.96 m)
- Listed weight: 230 lb (104 kg)

Career information
- High school: Fayetteville (Fayetteville, Arkansas)
- College: Minnesota (2024–present)
- Stats at ESPN

Drake Lindsey (born August 18, 2005) is an American college football quarterback for the Minnesota Golden Gophers.

== Early life ==
Lindsey attended Fayetteville High School in Fayetteville, Arkansas. As a junior, he threw for 3,778 yards, 37 touchdowns and three interceptions in 11 games, and was named the 2023 Arkansas MaxPreps Player of the Year. As a senior, Lindsey threw for 3,916 yards and 52 touchdowns, while completing 69.6% of his pass attempts, and was named the 2024 Arkansas Gatorade Player of the Year. Coming out of high school, he was rated as a three-star recruit and committed to play college football for the Minnesota Golden Gophers.

== College career ==
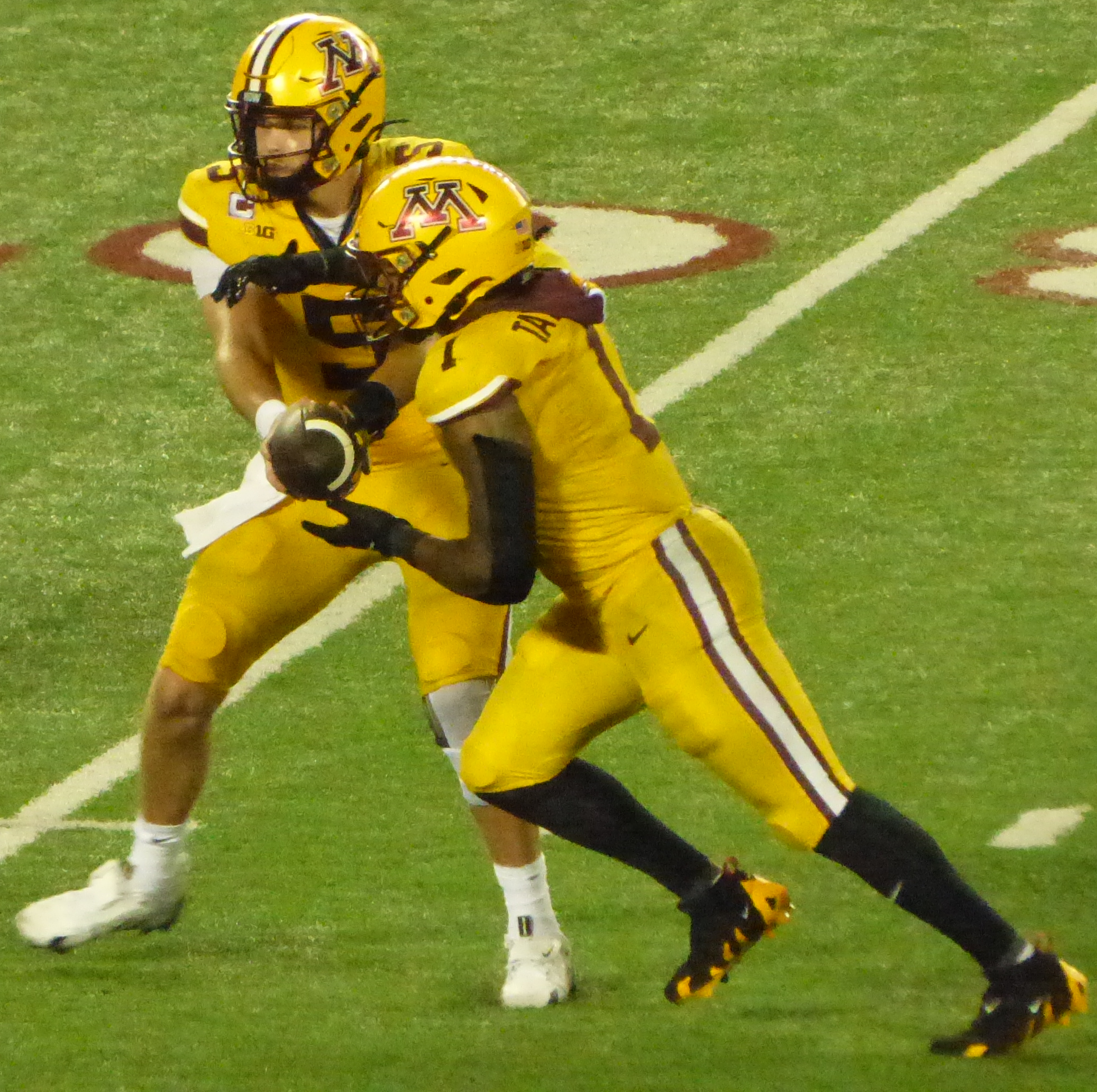
Lindsey handing the ball off to Darius Taylor

As a freshman in 2024, Lindsey completed four of five pass attempts for 50 yards and a touchdown in three games. Ahead of the 2025 season, he entered a quarterback competition with Dylan Wittke, Max Shikenjanski, and Jackson Kollock.

Lindsey completed the 2025 regular season starting every game for the University of Minnesota. He finished with 2,235 passing yards, 16 touchdowns, and six interceptions. He led the Gophers to a record of 7-5 (5-4 in the Big Ten), and won his first career start vs Minnesota's biggest rival, the University of Wisconsin.

=== Statistics ===
Year	Team	Games			Passing								Rushing			
Year	Team	GP	GS	Record	Cmp	Att	Pct	Yds	Y/A	TD	Int	Rtg	Att	Yds	Avg	TD
2024	Minnesota	3	0	—	4	5	80.0	50	10.0	1	0	230.0	1	6	6.0	0
2025	Minnesota	13	13	8–5	246	389	63.2	2,382	6.1	18	6	126.9	34	-119	-3.5	4
2026	Minnesota	7	7	5–2	141	222	63.5	1,427	6.6	9	6	126.9	19	-24	-1.3	0
Career		23	20	13–7	391	616	63.5	3,904	6.3	28	12	127.8	54	-137	-2.5	4

== Personal life ==
His father John David Lindsey, grandfather Jim Lindsey, uncle Lyndy Lindsey, and cousin Jack Lindsey all played college football at Arkansas, while his grandfather went on to play in the NFL as a running back for the Minnesota Vikings. His other cousin Link Lindsey, is a triple jumper for the Razorbacks track and field team, and his sister Loran Lindsey plays for Arkansas's basketball team.

== Legal issues ==
On May 1, 2026, Lindsey was arrested in Fayetteville, Arkansas for underage alcohol consumption and fake identification presentation. He was released from jail after posting a $470 bond.
