= John Nestor (American football) =

American football player (born 2005)

No. 17 – Minnesota Golden Gophers
- Position: Defensive back
- Class: Senior

Personal information
- Born: May 13, 2005 (age 21)
- Listed height: 6 ft 1 in (1.85 m)
- Listed weight: 205 lb (93 kg)

Career information
- High school: Marist (Chicago, Illinois)
- College: Iowa (2023–2024); Minnesota (2025–present)
- Stats at ESPN

John Nestor (born May 13, 2005) is an American football cornerback for the Minnesota Golden Gophers. He previously played for the Iowa Hawkeyes.

== Early life ==
Nestor attended Marist High School in Chicago, Illinois. Coming out of high school, he was rated as a three-star recruit by 247Sports and committed to play college football for the Iowa Hawkeyes over offers from other schools such as Iowa State, Minnesota, Purdue, and Kansas.

== College career ==
=== Iowa ===
As a freshman in 2023, Nestor played sparingly, but entered the 2024 season with an expanded role. He appeared in ten games that season, recording 14 tackles and a fumble recovery, after which he entered his name into the NCAA transfer portal.

=== Minnesota ===
Nestor transferred to play for the Minnesota Golden Gophers. In week 2 of the 2025 season, he notched two interceptions, one of which he returned 29 yards for a touchdown, in a victory over Northwestern State. Nestor was named the Big Ten Defensive Player of the Week following a win over Wisconsin in the regular season finale, recording nine tackles with two being for a loss, two interceptions, and a fumble recovery.
