= Jameson Geers =

American football player (born 2004)

Profile
- Position: Tight end

Personal information
- Born: December 5, 2002 (age 23); Channahon, Illinois, U.S.
- Listed height: 6 ft 5 in (1.96 m)
- Listed weight: 250 lb (113 kg)

Career information
- High school: Providence Catholic (New Lenox, Illinois)
- College: Minnesota (2021–2025)
- NFL draft: 2026: undrafted

Career history
- Arizona Cardinals (2026)*
- * Offseason or practice squad member only
- Stats at Pro Football Reference

Jameson Geers (born December 5, 2002) is an American professional football tight end. He played college football for the Minnesota Golden Gophers.

== Early life ==
Geers attended Providence Catholic High School in New Lenox, Illinois. He committed to play college football for the Minnesota Golden Gophers over offers from other schools such as Iowa, Wisconsin, Northwestern, Purdue, and Illinois.

== College career ==
In his first three seasons from 2021 to 2023, Geers tallied four catches for 22 yards and a touchdown in 22 games. In week 9 of the 2024 season, he had one reception for 23 yards in a victory over Maryland. Geers finished the 2024 season with 28 catches for 290 yards and four touchdowns.

== Professional career ==
Pre-draft measurables
Height	Weight	Arm length	Hand span	Wingspan	40-yard dash	10-yard split	20-yard split	20-yard shuttle	Three-cone drill	Vertical jump	Broad jump	Bench press
6 ft 4 3/8 in (1.94 m)	245 lb (111 kg)	33 3/8 in (0.85 m)	10 in (0.25 m)	6 ft 6 1/2 in (1.99 m)	4.91 s	1.72 s	2.82 s	4.44 s	7.18 s	33.0 in (0.84 m)	10 ft 0 in (3.05 m)	14 reps
All values from Pro Day

On April 28, 2026, after going undrafted in the 2026 NFL draft, Geers signed with the Arizona Cardinals as an undrafted free agent. He was placed on injured reserve on August 15. On October 27, he was released with an injury settlement.
