= Darius Taylor (American football) =

American football player (born 2004)

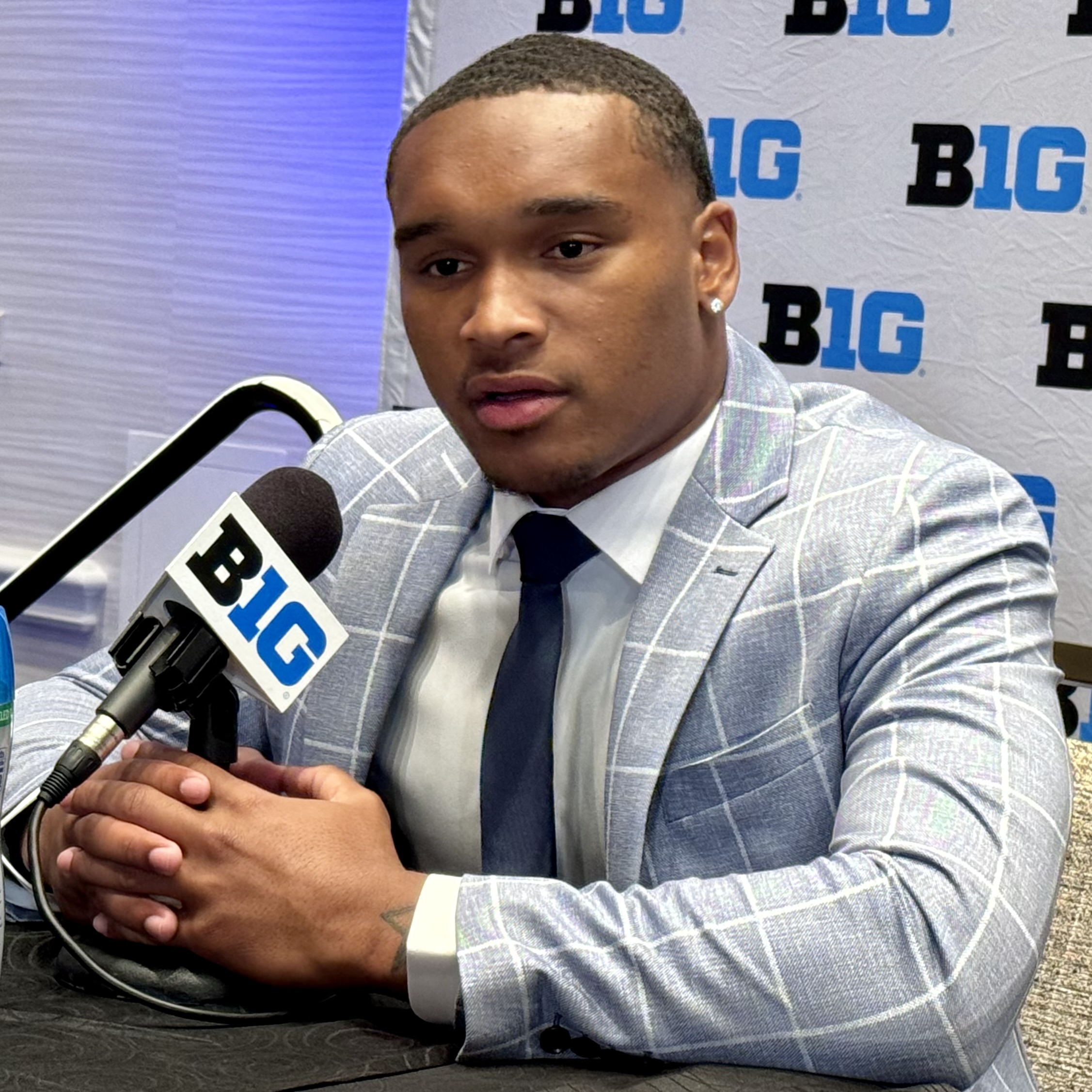
- Taylor at 2025 Big Ten Media Days

No. 1 – Minnesota Golden Gophers
- Position: Running back
- Class: Senior

Personal information
- Listed height: 6 ft 0 in (1.83 m)
- Listed weight: 215 lb (98 kg)

Career information
- High school: Walled Lake Western (Walled Lake, Michigan)
- College: Minnesota (2023–present)
- Stats at ESPN

Darius Taylor is an American college football running back for the Minnesota Golden Gophers.

== Early life ==
Taylor attended Walled Lake Western High School in Walled Lake, Michigan. As a senior, he rushed for 2,450 yards and 36 touchdowns on 268 carries, while also hauling in 14 receptions for 300 yards and a touchdown. Taylor was rated a three-star recruit and committed to play college football at the University of Minnesota over other offers from schools such as Boston College, Iowa, Michigan State and Wisconsin.

== College career ==
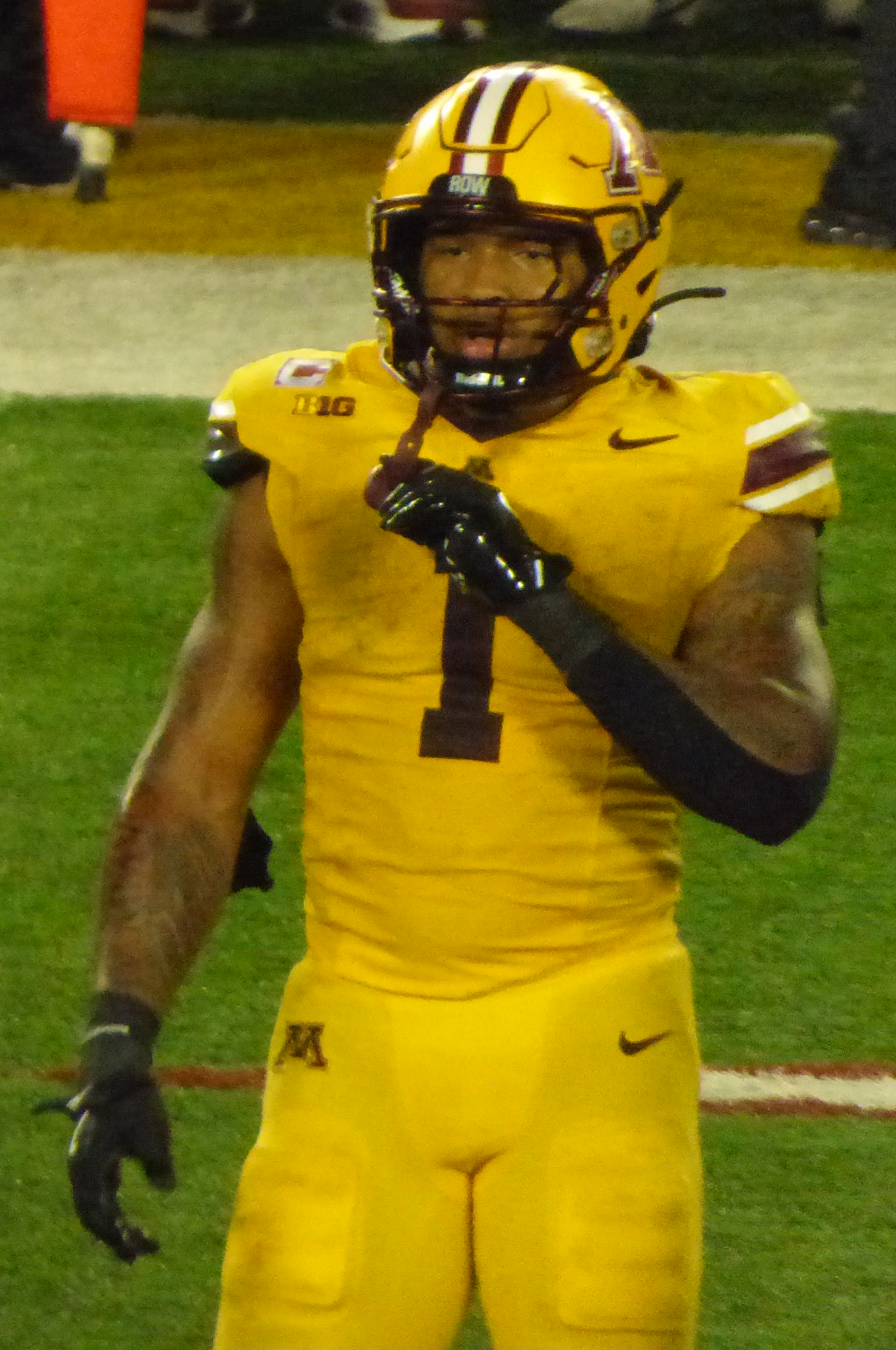
Taylor in a 2025 game against Buffalo

Taylor enrolled early at Minnesota in January 2023. He made his collegiate debut against Nebraska where he made one rushing attempt for three yards. Taylor was named the Big Ten Conference Freshman of the Week for three weeks in a row after his performances against Eastern Michigan in week 2, North Carolina in week 3 and Northwestern in week 4. However, after rushing for 198 yards and two touchdowns versus Northwestern, Taylor left the game with an injury.
