= 2025 Oregon Ducks football team =

American college football season

2025 Oregon Ducks football

Orange Bowl champion

CFP First Round, W 51–34 vs. James Madison Orange Bowl (CFP Quarterfinal), W 23–0 vs. Texas Tech Peach Bowl (CFP Semifinal), L 22–56 vs. Indiana
- Conference: Big Ten Conference

Ranking
- Coaches: No. 4
- AP: No. 4
- Record: 13–2 (8–1 Big Ten)
- Head coach: Dan Lanning (4th season)
- Offensive coordinator: Will Stein (3rd season)
- Co-offensive coordinator: Drew Mehringer (4th season)
- Offensive scheme: Spread option
- Defensive coordinator: Tosh Lupoi (4th season)
- Co-defensive coordinator: Chris Hampton (3rd season)
- Base defense: 4–3 or 4–2–5
- Home stadium: Autzen Stadium

Uniform

2025 Big Ten Conference football standings
| | Conf. | | | Overall |
| Team | W | | L | W | | L |
|---|---|---|---|---|---|---|
| No. 1 Indiana y$#^ | 9 | – | 0 | 16 | – | 0 |
| No. 5 Ohio State y^ | 9 | – | 0 | 12 | – | 2 |
| No. 4 Oregon ^ | 8 | – | 1 | 13 | – | 2 |
| No. 21 Michigan | 7 | – | 2 | 9 | – | 4 |
| No. 20 USC | 7 | – | 2 | 9 | – | 4 |
| No. 17 Iowa | 6 | – | 3 | 9 | – | 4 |
| Illinois | 5 | – | 4 | 9 | – | 4 |
| Washington | 5 | – | 4 | 9 | – | 4 |
| Minnesota | 5 | – | 4 | 8 | – | 5 |
| Nebraska | 4 | – | 5 | 7 | – | 6 |
| Northwestern | 4 | – | 5 | 7 | – | 6 |
| Penn State | 3 | – | 6 | 7 | – | 6 |
| UCLA | 3 | – | 6 | 3 | – | 9 |
| Rutgers | 2 | – | 7 | 5 | – | 7 |
| Wisconsin | 2 | – | 7 | 4 | – | 8 |
| Maryland | 1 | – | 8 | 4 | – | 8 |
| Michigan State | 1 | – | 8 | 4 | – | 8 |
| Purdue | 0 | – | 9 | 2 | – | 10 |
Championship: Indiana 13, Ohio State 10
# – College Football Playoff champion; ^ – College Football Playoff participant; $ – Conference champion; y – Championship game participant; As of November 17, 2026; Rankings from AP Poll

The 2025 Oregon Ducks football team represented the University of Oregon as a member of the Big Ten Conference during the 2025 NCAA Division I FBS football season. The team was led by Dan Lanning, in his fourth year as head coach, and they played their home games at Autzen Stadium in Eugene, Oregon. This was the Ducks' second year in the Big Ten.

== Offseason ==
=== 2025 NFL draft ===
| Round | Pick | Player | Position | Team |
|---|---|---|---|---|
| 1 | 21 | Derrick Harmon | DT | Pittsburgh Steelers |
| 1 | 29 | Josh Conerly Jr. | OT | Washington Commanders |
| 2 | 46 | Terrance Ferguson | TE | Los Angeles Rams |
| 3 | 78 | Jordan Burch | DE | Arizona Cardinals |
| 3 | 86 | Jamaree Caldwell | DT | Los Angeles Chargers |
| 3 | 94 | Dillon Gabriel | QB | Cleveland Browns |
| 5 | 147 | Jordan James | RB | San Francisco 49ers |
| 5 | 156 | Jeffrey Bassa | LB | Kansas City Chiefs |
| 6 | 204 | Ajani Cornelius | OT | Dallas Cowboys |
| 7 | 235 | Tez Johnson | WR | Tampa Bay Buccaneers |

==== Undrafted NFL free agents ====
| Player | Position | Team |
|---|---|---|
| Traeshon Holden | WR | Dallas Cowboys |
| Brandon Johnson | S | Philadelphia Eagles |
| Jabbar Muhammad | CB | Jacksonville Jaguars |
| Dontae Manning | CB | Atlanta Falcons |
| Nikko Reed | DB | Los Angeles Chargers |

== Schedule ==
| Date | Time | Opponent | Rank | Site | TV | Result | Attendance |
|---|---|---|---|---|---|---|---|
| August 30 | 1:00 p.m. | No. 2 (FCS) Montana State* | No. 7 | Autzen Stadium; Eugene, OR | BTN | W 59–13 | 57,257 |
| September 6 | 12:30 p.m. | Oklahoma State* | No. 6 | Autzen Stadium; Eugene, OR | CBS | W 69–3 | 57,266 |
| September 13 | 9:00 a.m. | at Northwestern | No. 4 | Martin Stadium; Evanston, IL (Big Noon Kickoff) | FOX | W 34–14 | 12,023 |
| September 20 | 12:00 p.m. | Oregon State* | No. 6 | Autzen Stadium; Eugene, OR (rivalry) | BTN | W 41–7 | 58,571 |
| September 27 | 4:30 p.m. | at No. 3 Penn State | No. 6 | Beaver Stadium; University Park, PA (College GameDay) | NBC | W 30–24 ^{2OT} | 111,015 |
| October 11 | 12:30 p.m. | No. 7 Indiana | No. 3 | Autzen Stadium; Eugene, OR (College GameDay) | CBS | L 20–30 | 59,625 |
| October 18 | 3:30 p.m. | at Rutgers | No. 8 | SHI Stadium; Piscataway, NJ | BTN | W 56–10 | 53,127 |
| October 25 | 4:00 p.m. | Wisconsin^{†} | No. 6 | Autzen Stadium; Eugene, OR | FS1 | W 21–7 | 58,940 |
| November 8 | 12:30 p.m. | at No. 20 Iowa | No. 9 | Kinnick Stadium; Iowa City, IA (Big Noon Kickoff) | CBS | W 18–16 | 69,250 |
| November 14 | 6:00 p.m. | Minnesota | No. 8 | Autzen Stadium; Eugene, OR | FOX | W 42–13 | 58,830 |
| November 22 | 12:30 p.m. | No. 15 USC | No. 7 | Autzen Stadium; Eugene, OR (rivalry, College GameDay) | CBS | W 42–27 | 59,588 |
| November 29 | 12:30 p.m. | at Washington | No. 6 | Husky Stadium; Seattle, WA (rivalry) | CBS | W 26–14 | 72,376 |
| December 20 | 4:30 p.m. | (12) No. 24 James Madison* | (5) No. 5 | Autzen Stadium; Eugene, OR (CFP First Round) | TNT/HBO Max | W 51–34 | 55,124 |
| January 1, 2026 | 9:00 a.m. | vs. (4) No. 4 Texas Tech* | (5) No. 5 | Hard Rock Stadium; Miami Gardens, FL (Orange Bowl–CFP Quarterfinal) | ESPN | W 23–0 | 65,021 |
| January 9, 2026 | 4:30 p.m. | vs. (1) No. 1 Indiana* | (5) No. 5 | Mercedes-Benz Stadium; Atlanta, GA (Peach Bowl–CFP Semifinal, College GameDay) | ESPN | L 22–56 | 75,604 |
*Non-conference game; ^{†}Homecoming; Rankings from AP Poll (and CFP Rankings, after November 4) - Released prior to game; All times are in Pacific time; Source:

== Roster ==
2025 Oregon Ducks football team roster
Players
Coaches
Offense

| Pos. | # | Name | Class |
|---|---|---|---|
| RB | 0 | Jordon Davison | Fr |
| WR | 1 | Dakorien Moore | Fr |
| WR | 2 | Gary Bryant Jr. | So |
| WR | 3 | Kyler Kasper | Jr |
| WR | 4 | Malik Benson | Sr |
| QB | 5 | Dante Moore | So |
| RB | 6 | Noah Whittington | Sr |
| WR | 7 | Evan Stewart | Sr |
| TE | 9 | Jamari Johnson | So |
| QB | 10 | Luke Moga | Fr |
| WR | 11 | Jeremiah McClellan | Fr |
| QB | 12 | Brock Thomas | So |
| QB | 13 | Ryder Hayes | Fr |
| WR | 14 | Justius Lowe | Jr |
| QB | 15 | Akili Smith Jr. | Fr |
| QB | 16 | Austin Novosad | So |
| WR | 17 | Cooper Perry | Fr |
| TE | 18 | Kenyon Sadiq | Jr |
| QB | 19 | Mark Wiepert | Fr |
| RB | 20 | Makhi Hughes | Jr |
| RB | 21 | Da'Jaun Riggs | Fr |
| RB | 22 | Jay Harris | Jr |
| RB | 23 | Dierre Hill | Fr |
| RB | 27 | Jayden Limar | Jr |
| WR | 30 | Aaron Bidwell | Fr |
| RB | 40 | Zander Quinn | Jr |
| TE | 44 | Zach Grace | So |
| OL | 50 | Demetri Manning | Fr |
| OL | 53 | Devin Brooks | Fr |
| OL | 55 | Douglas Utu | Fr |
| OL | 56 | Trent Ferguson | Fr |
| OL | 57 | Zac Stascausky | Fr |
| OL | 58 | Ziyare Addison | Fr |
| OL | 59 | Fox Crader | Fr |
| OL | 66 | Bryce Boulton | So |
| OL | 67 | Beau CressAllen | So |
| OL | 68 | Auston Mims | So |
| OL | 70 | Charlie Pickard | Sr |
| OL | 71 | Alex Harkey | Sr |
| OL | 72 | Iapani Laloulu | Jr |
| OL | 73 | Kawika Rogers | Jr |
| OL | 74 | Dave Iuli | Jr |
| OL | 75 | Emmanuel Pregnon | Sr |
| OL | 76 | Isaiah World | Sr |
| OL | 77 | Matthew Bedford | Sr |
| OL | 78 | Gernorris Wilson | So |
| OL | 79 | Lipe Moala | So |
| WR | 80 | Dillon Gresham | Fr |
| TE | 81 | Vander Ploog | Fr |
| WR | 82 | Nathan McCoy II | Fr |
| TE | 83 | Roger Saleapaga | So |
| WR | 84 | Jovon McRae II | Fr |
| TE | 85 | Kade Caton | Fr |
| WR | 86 | Darrian Anderson | Jr |
| TE | 87 | A. J. Pugliano | Fr |
| WR | 88 | Jack Ressler | Fr |
| WR | 89 | Brady Bidwell | Fr |

Defense

| Pos. | # | Name | Class |
|---|---|---|---|
| DB | 0 | Daylen Austin | So |
| DL | 1 | Bear Alexander | Jr |
| DB | 2 | Kingston Lopa | Fr |
| DB | 3 | Sione Laulea | Jr |
| DB | 4 | Brandon Finney Jr. | Fr |
| DB | 5 | Theran Johnson | Sr |
| DB | 6 | Jahlil Florence | Jr |
| DB | 7 | Ify Obidegwu | Fr |
| DB | 8 | Trey McNutt | Fr |
| OLB | 9 | Blake Purchase | So |
| OLB | 10 | Matayo Uiagalelei | Jr |
| DB | 11 | Dakoda Fields | Fr |
| DB | 12 | Peyton Woodyard | So |
| ILB | 13 | Gavin Nix | Fr |
| DB | 14 | Na'eem Offord | Fr |
| DB | 15 | Solomon Davis | So |
| DB | 18 | Dorian Brew | Fr |
| OLB | 19 | Tobi Haastrup | Fr |
| ILB | 20 | Dylan Williams | Fr |
| DB | 21 | Aaron Flowers | Fr |
| DB | 22 | Jadon Canady | Sr |
| ILB | 23 | Brayden Platt | Fr |
| DB | 24 | Zach Grisham | Fr |
| DB | 25 | Kilohana Haasenritter | Sr |
| ILB | 26 | Devon Jackson | Jr |
| ILB | 28 | Bryce Boettcher | Sr |
| OLB | 29 | Ashton Porter | Fr |
| DB | 30 | Xavier Barksdale | So |
| DB | 31 | Dillon Thieneman | Jr |
| OLB | 32 | Nasir Wyatt | Fr |
| ILB | 33 | Kamar Mothudi | Fr |
| DB | 34 | Cruz Rushing | Jr |
| ILB | 38 | Will Straton | So |
| DB | 39 | Cormac O'Flaherty | Fr |
| DL | 42 | Aydin Breland | Fr |
| OLB | 44 | Teitum Tuioti | Jr |
| OLB | 45 | Torrence Williams | So |
| ILB | 46 | Jay Harden | Fr |
| OLB | 47 | Elijah Rushing | Fr |
| DL | 50 | Tionne Gray | Fr |
| DL | 52 | A'Mauri Washington | Jr |
| ILB | 54 | Jerry Mixon | Jr |
| DE | 55 | Matthew Johnson | Fr |
| DL | 61 | JaJuan Dickey | Jr |
| DL | 77 | Jericho Johnson | Fr |
| DL | 88 | Xadavien Sims | Fr |
| DL | 99 | Terrance Green | So |

Special teams

| Pos. | # | Name | Class |
|---|---|---|---|
| K | 25 | Rocco Graziano | Fr |
| K | 36 | Atticus Sappington | Sr |
| LS | 43 | Luke Basso | Sr |
| P | 46 | James Ferguson-Reynolds | Sr |
| P | 92 | Ross James | Sr |
| LS | 96 | Nick Duzansky | So |
| K | 97 | Gage Hurych | Fr |
| K | 98 | Andrew Boyle | Sr |

Head coach

- Dan Lanning

Coordinators/assistant coaches

- Ra'Shaad Samples – Assistant head coach/running backs
- Will Stein – Offensive coordinator/quarterbacks
- Tosh Lupoi – Defensive coordinator/linebackers
- Chris Hampton – Co-defensive coordinator/defensive backs
- Joe Lorig – Special teams coordinator/nickels
- Drew Mehringer – Co-offensive coordinator/tight ends
- Ross Douglas – Wide receivers/pass game coordinator
- Brian Michalowski – Inside linebackers
- A'lique Terry – Offensive linemen
- Tony Tuioti – Defensive linemen
- Cutter Leftwich – Assistant offensive line/run game coordinator
- Kamran Araghi – Edge
- Rashad Wadood – Cornerbacks
- Koa Ka'ai – Assistant quarterbacks
- Wilson Love – Director, strength and conditioning
- Anthony Kincy – Assistant, strength and conditioning'
- Mark Davis – Assistant, strength and conditioning
- Drew Jordan – Assistant, strength and conditioning
- Kyle Bolton – Director, speed and performance
- Donte Ellington – Offensive analyst
- Parker Flemming – Offensive analyst
- Steven Haunga – Offensive analyst
- Dallas Warmack – Offensive analyst
- Dante Bartee – Defensive analyst
- Zach Betz – Defensive analyst
- Connor Boyd – Defensive analyst
- Kyle Cogan – Defensive analyst
- Darrion Daniels – Defensive analyst
- Jaime Silva – Defensive analyst
- Zach Tinker – Special teams analyst
- Jack Smith – Graduate assistant
- Ryan Walk – Graduate assistant

Legend

- (C) Team captain
- (S) Suspended
- (I) Ineligible
- Injured
- Redshirt

Roster

== Rankings ==
Ranking movements Legend: ██ Increase in ranking ██ Decrease in ranking т = Tied with team above or below ( ) = First-place votes
| | Week | | | | | | | | | | | | | | | | |
| Poll | Pre | 1 | 2 | 3 | 4 | 5 | 6 | 7 | 8 | 9 | 10 | 11 | 12 | 13 | 14 | 15 | Final |
|---|---|---|---|---|---|---|---|---|---|---|---|---|---|---|---|---|---|
| AP | 7 (1) | 6 (1) | 4 (1) | 6 (1) | 6 (1) | 2 (16) | 3 (5) | 8 | 6 | 6 | 6 | 7 | 6т | 5 | 4 | 5 | 4 |
| Coaches | 7 | 5 | 5 | 5 | 5 (1) | 2 (6) | 2 (3) | 9 | 6 | 6 | 6 | 6 | 5 | 5 | 4 | 5 | 4 |
| CFP | Not released | | | | | | | | | | 9 | 8 | 7 | 6 | 5 | 5 | Not released |

== Game summaries ==
=== vs No. 2 (FCS) Montana State ===
No. 2 (FCS) Montana State Bobcats (0–0) at No. 7 Oregon Ducks (0–0) – Game summary

| Quarter | 1 | 2 | 3 | 4 | Total |
|---|---|---|---|---|---|
| No. 2 (FCS) Bobcats | 0 | 3 | 3 | 7 | 13 |
| No. 7 Ducks | 17 | 21 | 14 | 7 | 59 |

at Autzen Stadium • Eugene, Oregon

- Date: August 30
- Game time: 1:00 p.m.
- Game weather:
- Game attendance: 57,257
- Referee: Kole Knueppel
- TV announcers (BTN): Jeff Levering (play-by-play), Jake Butt (analyst), and Brooke Fletcher (sideline reporter)

Game information

First quarter

- ORE – Jayden Limar 16-yard run (Atticus Sappington kick), 11:57. Ducks 7–0. Drive: 6 plays, 74 yards, 2:03.
- ORE – Kenyon Sadiq 20-yard pass from Dante Moore (Atticus Sappington kick), 9:16. Ducks 14–0. Drive: 3 plays, 40 yards, 1:18.
- ORE – Atticus Sappington 23-yard field goal, 6:16. Ducks 17–0. Drive: 4 plays, 5 yards, 1:25.

Second quarter

- ORE – Jordon Davison 2-yard run (Atticus Sappington kick), 11:08. Ducks 24–0. Drive: 12 plays, 59 yards, 5:27.
- ORE – Noah Whittington 1-yard run (Gage Hurych kick), 4:34. Ducks 31–0. Drive: 10 plays, 52 yards, 5:10.
- MTST – Myles Sansted 42-yard field goal, 1:03. Ducks 31–3. Drive: 13 plays, 50 yards, 3:31.
- ORE – Malik Benson 11-yard pass from Dante Moore (Atticus Sappington kick), 0:03. Ducks 38–3. Drive: 6 plays, 67 yards, 1:00.

Third quarter

- MTST – Myles Sansted 42-yard field goal, 10:14. Ducks 38–6. Drive: 9 plays, 51 yards, 4:46.
- ORE – Gary Bryant Jr. 14-yard pass from Dante Moore (Atticus Sappington kick), 6:43. Ducks 45–6. Drive: 6 plays, 70 yards, 3:31.
- ORE – Jordon Davison 8-yard run (Gage Hurych kick), 0:26. Ducks 52–6. Drive: 6 plays, 65 yards, 2:02.

Fourth quarter

- ORE – Jordon Davison 1-yard run (Gage Hurych kick), 6:50. Ducks 59–6. Drive: 8 plays, 80 yards, 4:47.
- MTST – Adam Jones 2-yard run (Myles Sansted kick), 2:22. Ducks 59–13. Drive: 9 plays, 75 yards, 4:28.

| Statistics | MTST | ORE |
|---|---|---|
| First downs | 17 | 29 |
| Plays–yards | 58–244 | 64–506 |
| Rushes–yards | 27–46 | 39–253 |
| Passing yards | 198 | 253 |
| Passing: comp–att–int | 23–31–0 | 19–25–0 |
| Turnovers | 0 | 0 |
| Time of possession | 29:55 | 30:08 |

| Team | Category | Player | Statistics |
|---|---|---|---|
| Montana State | Passing | Justin Lamson | 23/31, 198 yards |
| Montana State | Rushing | Julius Davis | 5 carries, 16 yards |
| Montana State | Receiving | Taco Dowler | 12 receptions, 107 yards |
| Oregon | Passing | Dante Moore | 18/23, 213 yards, 3 TD |
| Oregon | Rushing | Noah Whittington | 10 carries, 68 yards, TD |
| Oregon | Receiving | Malik Benson | 5 receptions, 51 yards, TD |

=== vs Oklahoma State ===
Oklahoma State Cowboys (1–0) at No. 6 Oregon Ducks (1–0) – Game summary

| Quarter | 1 | 2 | 3 | 4 | Total |
|---|---|---|---|---|---|
| Cowboys | 0 | 3 | 0 | 0 | 3 |
| No. 6 Ducks | 20 | 21 | 28 | 0 | 69 |

at Autzen Stadium • Eugene, Oregon

- Date: September 6
- Game time: 12:30 p.m.
- Game weather: Cloudy
- Game attendance: 57,266
- Referee: Stephen Baron
- TV announcers (CBS): Brad Nessler (play-by-play), Gary Danielson (analyst), and Jenny Dell (sideline reporter)

Game information

First quarter

- (14:20) ORE – Noah Whittington 59-yard run, Atticus Sappington kick (Drive: 2 plays, 65 yards, 0:40; ORE 7–0)
- (13:24) ORE – Dakorien Moore 65-yard pass from Dante Moore (Drive: 1 play, 65 yards, 0:12; ORE 13–0)
- (5:04) ORE – Dierre Hill Jr. 19-yard run, Atticus Sappington kick (Drive: 4 plays, 80 yards, 2:11; ORE 20–0)

Second quarter

- (12:08) OKST – Logan Ward 23-yard field goal (Drive:16 plays, 69 yards, 7:56; ORE 20–3)
- (9:39) ORE – Malik Benson 42 yard pass from Dante Moore, Atticus Sappington kick (Drive: 5 plays, 75 yards, 2:29; ORE 27–3)
- (5:46) ORE – Dakorien Moore 25-yard run, Atticus Sappington kick (Drive: 5 plays, 63 yards, 2:05; ORE 34–3)
- (0:11) ORE – Jayden Limar 5-yard run, Atticus Sappington kick (Drive: 12 plays, 76 yards, 4:09; ORE 41–3)

Third quarter

- (9:20) ORE – Gary Bryant Jr 11-yard pass from Dante Moore, Gage Hurych kick (Drive: 10 plays, 63 yards, 4:20; ORE 48–3)
- (1:17) ORE – Jordon Davison 1-yard run, Gage Hurych kick (Drive: 4 plays, 55 yards, 1:37; ORE 55–3)
- (1:09) ORE – Jerry Mison 26-yard interception return, Gage Hurych kick (Drive 1 play, 0 yards, 0:08; ORE 62–3)
- (0:27) ORE – Peyton Woodyard 28-yard interception return, Gage Hurych kick (Drive: 2 plays, 3 yards, 0:42; ORE 69–3)

Fourth quarter

- No scoring plays.

| Statistics | OKST | ORE |
|---|---|---|
| First downs | 9 | 24 |
| Plays–yards | 61–211 | 62–631 |
| Rushes–yards | 42–144 | 37–312 |
| Passing yards | 67 | 319 |
| Passing: comp–att–int | 7–19–2 | 18–25–0 |
| Turnovers | 2 | 0 |
| Time of possession | 31:19 | 28:41 |

| Team | Category | Player | Statistics |
|---|---|---|---|
| Oklahoma State | Passing | Zane Flores | 7/19, 67 yards |
| Oklahoma State | Rushing | Kalib Hicks | 14 carries, 63 yards |
| Oklahoma State | Receiving | Christi Fitzpatrick | 2 receptions, 34 yards |
| Oregon | Passing | Dante Moore | 16/21, 266 yards, 3 TD |
| Oregon | Rushing | Noah Whittington | 4 carries, 91 yards, TD |
| Oregon | Receiving | Gary Bryant Jr. | 3 receptions, 46 yards, TD |

=== at Northwestern ===
No. 4 Oregon Ducks (2–0) at Northwestern Wildcats (1–1) – Game summary

| Quarter | 1 | 2 | 3 | 4 | Total |
|---|---|---|---|---|---|
| No. 4 Ducks | 7 | 10 | 14 | 3 | 34 |
| Wildcats | 0 | 0 | 0 | 14 | 14 |

at Martin Stadium • Evanston, Illinois

- Date: September 13
- Game time: 9:00 a.m.
- Game weather: Cloudy • Temperature: 67 °F (19 °C) • Wind: SE at 15 miles per hour (24 km/h)
- Game attendance: 12,023
- Referee: Jason Nickleby
- TV announcers (FOX): Gus Johnson (play-by-play), Joel Klatt (analyst), and Jenny Taft (sideline reporter)

Game information

First quarter

- (2:18) ORE – Jayden Limar 1-yard run, Atticus Sappington kick (Drive: 5 plays, 23 yards, 2:37; ORE 7-0)

Second quarter

- (9:28) ORE – Atticus Sappington 42-yard field goal (Drive: 12 plays, 56 yards, 6:03; ORE 10-0)
- (0:31) ORE – Kenyon Sadiq 24-yard pass from Dante Moore, Atticus Sappington kick (Drive: 11 plays, 89 yards, 4:20; ORE 17-0)

Third quarter

- (7:44) ORE – Dierre Hill Jr. 66-yard run, Atticus Sappington kick (Drive: 1 plays, 66 yards, 0:12; ORE 24-0)
- (2:56) ORE – Jordon Davison 2-yard run, Atticus Sappington kick (Drive: 4 plays, 35 yards, 2:22; ORE 31-0)

Fourth quarter

- (11:27) ORE – Atticus Sappington 25-yard field goal (Drive: 4 plays, 5 yards, 1:24; ORE 34-0)
- (6:20) NU – Caleb Komolafe 1-yard run, Jack Olsen kick (Drive: 9 plays, 75 yards, 5:07; ORE 34-7)
- (1:48) NU – Dashun Reeder 79-yard run, Jack Olsen kick (Drive: 3 plays, 91 yards, 1:13; ORE 34-14)

| Statistics | ORE | NU |
|---|---|---|
| First downs | 21 | 15 |
| Plays–yards | 56–373 | 59–313 |
| Rushes–yards | 30–176 | 37–178 |
| Passing yards | 197 | 135 |
| Passing: comp–att–int | 19–26–1 | 11–22–2 |
| Turnovers | 1 | 2 |
| Time of possession | 27:42 | 32:18 |

| Team | Category | Player | Statistics |
|---|---|---|---|
| Oregon | Passing | Dante Moore | 16/20, 178 yards, TD, INT |
| Oregon | Rushing | Dierre Hill Jr. | 5 carries, 94 yards, TD |
| Oregon | Receiving | Malik Benson | 4 receptions, 62 yards |
| Northwestern | Passing | Preston Stone | 11/21, 135 yards, 2 INT |
| Northwestern | Rushing | Dashun Reeder | 1 carry, 79 yards, TD |
| Northwestern | Receiving | Griffin Wilde | 4 receptions, 55 yards |

=== vs Oregon State (Civil War) ===
Oregon State Beavers (0–3) at No. 6 Oregon Ducks (3–0) – Game summary

| Quarter | 1 | 2 | 3 | 4 | Total |
|---|---|---|---|---|---|
| Beavers | 7 | 0 | 0 | 0 | 7 |
| No. 6 Ducks | 7 | 14 | 10 | 10 | 41 |

at Autzen Stadium • Eugene, Oregon

- Date: September 20
- Game time: 12:00 p.m.
- Game weather: Sunny
- Game attendance: 58,571
- Referee: John Love
- TV announcers (BTN): Jeff Levering (play-by-play), Jake Butt (analyst), and Brooke Fletcher (sideline reporter)

Game information

First quarter

- (12:10) ORE – Dakorien Moore 22-yard pass from Dante Moore, Atticus Sappington kick (Drive: 7 plays, 75 yards, 2:50; ORE 7-0)
- (1:50) ORST – Anthony Hankerson 1-yard run, Caleb Ojeda kick (Drive: 13 plays, 64 yards, 7:40; 7-7)

Second quarter

- (5:40) ORE – Kenyon Sadiq 23-yard pass from Dante Moore, Atticus Sappington kick (Drive: 12 plays, 92 yards, 6:10; ORE 14-7)
- (0:21) ORE – Jordon Davison 3-yard run, Atticus Sappington kick (Drive: 8 plays, 80 yards, 1:27; ORE 21-7)

Third quarter

- (8:18) ORE – Jeremiah McClellan 13-yard pass from Dante Moore, Gage Hurych kick (Drive: 11 plays, 72 yards, 5:36; ORE 28-7)
- (1:01) ORE – Atticus Sappington 24-yard field goal (Drive: 11 plays, 59 yards, 6:21; ORE 31-7)

Fourth quarter

- (14:20) ORE – Gary Bryant Jr. 49-yard pass from Dante Moore, Atticus Sappington kick (Drive: 3 plays, 74 yards, 0:45; ORE 38-7)
- (5:05) ORE – Atticus Sappington 28-yard field goal (Drive: 6 plays, 18 yards, 2:48; ORE 411-7)

| Statistics | ORST | ORE |
|---|---|---|
| First downs | 8 | 29 |
| Plays–yards | 48–147 | 77–585 |
| Rushes–yards | 26–67 | 47–280 |
| Passing yards | 80 | 305 |
| Passing: comp–att–int | 7–22–0 | 21–31–0 |
| Turnovers | 1 | 0 |
| Time of possession | 23:05 | 36:55 |

| Team | Category | Player | Statistics |
|---|---|---|---|
| Oregon State | Passing | Maalik Murphy | 5/18, 68 yards |
| Oregon State | Rushing | Anthony Hankerson | 14 carries, 38 yards, TD |
| Oregon State | Receiving | Taz Reddicks | 2 receptions, 27 yards |
| Oregon | Passing | Dante Moore | 21/31, 305 yards, 4 TD |
| Oregon | Rushing | Jayden Limar | 12 carries, 70 yards |
| Oregon | Receiving | Gary Bryant Jr. | 3 receptions, 65 yards, TD |

=== at No. 3 Penn State ===
No. 6 Oregon Ducks (4–0) at No. 3 Penn State Nittany Lions (3–0) – Game summary

| Quarter | 1 | 2 | 3 | 4 | OT | 2OT | Total |
|---|---|---|---|---|---|---|---|
| No. 6 Ducks | 0 | 3 | 7 | 7 | 7 | 6 | 30 |
| No. 3 Nittany Lions | 0 | 3 | 0 | 14 | 7 | 0 | 24 |

at Beaver Stadium • University Park, Pennsylvania

- Date: September 27
- Game time: 4:30 p.m.
- Game weather: 68 °F (20 °C) • Cloudy
- Game attendance: 111,015
- Referee: Ron Snodgrass
- TV announcers (NBC): Noah Eagle (play-by-play), Todd Blackledge (analyst), and Kathryn Tappen (sideline reporter)

Game information

First quarter

- No scoring plays.

Second quarter

- PSU – Ryan Barker 49-yard field goal, 13:26. Nittany Lions 3–0. Drive: 11 plays, 32 yards, 4:56.
- ORE – Atticus Sappington 42-yard field goal, 3:42. Tied 3–3. Drive: 10 plays, 51 yards, 4:13.

Third quarter

- ORE – Dierre Hill Jr. 8-yard pass from Dante Moore (Atticus Sappington kick), 3:16. Ducks 10–3. Drive: 10 plays, 80 yards, 5:55.

Fourth quarter

- ORE – Jordon Davison 8-yard run (Atticus Sappington kick), 12:25. Ducks 17–3. Drive: 10 plays, 75 yards, 4:57.
- PSU – Devonte Ross 35-yard pass from Drew Allar (Ryan Barker kick), 10:30. Ducks 17–10. Drive: 4 plays, 75 yards, 1:55.
- PSU – Devonte Ross 7-yard pass from Drew Allar (Ryan Barker kick), 0:30. Tied 17–17. Drive: 15 plays, 62 yards, 6:37.

First overtime

- PSU – Kaytron Allen 4-yard run (Ryan Barker kick). Nittany Lions 24–17. Drive: 3 plays, 25 yards.
- ORE – Jamari Johnson 2-yard pass from Dante Moore (Atticus Sappington kick). Tied 24–24. Drive: 7 plays, 25 yards.

Second overtime

- ORE – Gary Bryant Jr. 25-yard pass from Dante Moore (pass conversion failed). Ducks 30–24. Drive: 1 play, 25 yards.

| Statistics | ORE | PSU |
|---|---|---|
| First downs | 20 | 15 |
| Plays–yards | 78–424 | 60–276 |
| Rushes–yards | 39–176 | 35–139 |
| Passing yards | 248 | 137 |
| Passing: comp–att–int | 29–39–0 | 14–25–1 |
| Turnovers | 0 | 1 |
| Time of possession | 33:52 | 26:08 |

| Team | Category | Player | Statistics |
|---|---|---|---|
| Oregon | Passing | Dante Moore | 29/39, 248 yards, 3 TD |
| Oregon | Rushing | Dierre Hill Jr. | 10 carries, 82 yards |
| Oregon | Receiving | Dakorien Moore | 7 receptions, 89 yards |
| Penn State | Passing | Drew Allar | 14/25, 137 yards, 2 TD, INT |
| Penn State | Rushing | Kaytron Allen | 12 carries, 54 yards, TD |
| Penn State | Receiving | Devonte Ross | 4 receptions, 48 yards, 2 TD |

=== vs No. 7 Indiana ===
No. 7 Indiana Hoosiers (5–0) at No. 3 Oregon Ducks (5–0) – Game summary

| Quarter | 1 | 2 | 3 | 4 | Total |
|---|---|---|---|---|---|
| No. 7 Hoosiers | 10 | 3 | 7 | 10 | 30 |
| No. 3 Ducks | 7 | 3 | 3 | 7 | 20 |

at Autzen Stadium • Eugene, Oregon

- Date: October 11
- Game time: 12:30 p.m.
- Game weather: Cloudy • Temperature: 56 °F (13 °C) • Wind: SW at 10 miles per hour (16 km/h)
- Game attendance: 59,625
- Referee: Jeff Servinski
- TV announcers (CBS): Brad Nessler (play-by-play), Gary Danielson (analyst), and Jenny Dell (sideline reporter)

Game information

First quarter

- IU – Nico Radicic 42-yard field goal, 9:42. Hoosiers 3–0. 5 plays, 22 yards, 1:27.
- ORE – Malik Benson 44-yard pass from Dante Moore (Atticus Sappington kick), 5:15. Ducks 7–3. 3 plays, 51 yards, 0:43.
- IU – Roman Hemby 3-yard run (Nico Radicic kick), 0:15. Hoosiers 10–7. 9 plays, 75 yards, 5:00.

Second quarter

- ORE – Atticus Sappington 40-yard field goal, 9:18. Tied 10–10. 12 plays, 53 yards, 5:57.
- IU – Brendan Franke 58-yard field goal, 0:01. Hoosiers 13–10. 3 plays, 40 yards, 0:23.

Third quarter

- ORE – Atticus Sappington 33-yard field goal, 7:10. Tied 13–13. 8 plays, 22 yards, 3:19.
- IU – Roman Hemby 2-yard run (Nico Radicic kick), 2:16. Hoosiers 20–13. 9 plays, 75 yards, 4:54.

Fourth quarter

- ORE – Brandon Finney Jr. 35-yard interception return (Atticus Sappington kick), 12:42. Tied 20–20. 3 plays, 8 yards, 1:27.
- IU – Elijah Sarratt 8-yard pass from Fernando Mendoza (Nico Radicic kick), 6:23. Hoosiers 27–20. 12 plays, 75 yards, 6:19.
- IU – Brendan Franke 22-yard field goal, 2:06. Hoosiers 30–20. 9 plays, 28 yards, 3:57.

| Statistics | IU | ORE |
|---|---|---|
| First downs | 23 | 14 |
| Plays–yards | 64–343 | 64–267 |
| Rushes–yards | 33–128 | 30–81 |
| Passing yards | 215 | 186 |
| Passing: comp–att–int | 20–31–1 | 21–34–2 |
| Turnovers | 1 | 2 |
| Time of possession | 33:10 | 26:50 |

| Team | Category | Player | Statistics |
|---|---|---|---|
| Indiana | Passing | Fernando Mendoza | 20/31, 215 yards, TD, INT |
| Indiana | Rushing | Roman Hemby | 19 carries, 70 yards, 2 TD |
| Indiana | Receiving | Elijah Sarratt | 8 receptions, 121 yards, TD |
| Oregon | Passing | Dante Moore | 21/34, 186 yards, TD, 2 INT |
| Oregon | Rushing | Jordon Davison | 8 carries, 59 yards |
| Oregon | Receiving | Malik Benson | 1 reception, 44 yards, TD |

=== at Rutgers ===
No. 8 Oregon Ducks (5–1) at Rutgers Scarlet Knights (3–3) – Game summary

| Quarter | 1 | 2 | 3 | 4 | Total |
|---|---|---|---|---|---|
| No. 8 Ducks | 14 | 28 | 14 | 0 | 56 |
| Scarlet Knights | 3 | 0 | 0 | 7 | 10 |

at SHI Stadium • Piscataway, New Jersey

- Date: October 18
- Game time: 3:30 p.m.
- Game weather: Cloudy • Temperature: 63 °F (17 °C) • Wind: SE at 4 miles per hour (6.4 km/h)
- Game attendance: 53,127
- Referee: Gregory Blum
- TV announcers (BTN): Guy Haberman (play-by-play), Jake Butt (analyst), and Brooke Fletcher (sideline reporter)

Game information

First quarter

- (13:18) RUTG – Jai Patel 51-yard field goal (Drive: 4 plays, 0 yards, 0:17; Rutgers 3-0)
- (11:52) ORE – Noah Whittington 68-yard run, Atticus Sappington kick (Drive: 3 plays, 75 yards, 1:26; Oregon 7-3)
- (6:25) ORE – Kenyon Sadiq 30-yard pass from Dante Moore, Atticus Sappington kick (Drive: 10 plays, 87 yards, 4:05; Oregon 14-3)

Second quarter

- (14:02) ORE – Kenyon Sadiq 21-yard pass from Dante Moore, Gage Hurych kick (Drive: 4 plays, 79 yards, 1:39; Oregon 21-3)
- (11:34) ORE – Dakorien Moore 34-yard pass from Dante Moore, Atticus Sappington kick (Drive: 3 plays, 49 yards, 1:04; Oregon 28-3)
- (8:54) ORE – Noah Whittington 28-yard run, Atticus Sappington kick (Drive: 4 plays, 72 yards, 1:26; Oregon 35-3)
- (0:43) ORE – Noah Whittington 5-yard pass from Dante Moore, Gage Hurych kick (Drive: 3 plays, 75 yards, 1:26; Oregon 42-3)

Third quarter

- (11:44) ORE – Jordon Davison 20-yard run, Gage Hurych kick (Drive: 2 plays, 87 yards, 0:56; Oregon 49-3)
- (3:42) ORE – Dierre Hall Jr. 35-yard run, Gage Hurych kick (Drive: 3 plays, 58 yards, 1:36; Oregon 56-3)

Fourth quarter

- (6:40) RUTG – Ja'shon Benjamin 7-yard run, Jai Patel kick (Drive: 9 plays, 30 yards, 4:07; Oregon 56-10)

| Statistics | ORE | RUTG |
|---|---|---|
| First downs | 29 | 12 |
| Plays–yards | 61–750 | 69–202 |
| Rushes–yards | 37–415 | 42–123 |
| Passing yards | 335 | 79 |
| Passing: comp–att–int | 18–24–1 | 8–27–2 |
| Turnovers | 3 | 3 |
| Time of possession | 27:53 | 32:07 |

| Team | Category | Player | Statistics |
|---|---|---|---|
| Oregon | Passing | Dante Moore | 15/20, 290 yards, 4 TD, INT |
| Oregon | Rushing | Noah Whittington | 11 carries, 125 yards, 2 TD |
| Oregon | Receiving | Kenyon Sadiq | 4 receptions, 80 yards, 2 TD |
| Rutgers | Passing | Athan Kaliakmanis | 8/25, 79 yards, 2 INT |
| Rutgers | Rushing | Ja'shon Benjamin | 18 carries, 69 yards, TD |
| Rutgers | Receiving | KJ Duff | 3 receptions, 41 yards |

=== vs Wisconsin ===
Wisconsin Badgers (2–5) at No. 6 Oregon Ducks (6–1) – Game summary

| Quarter | 1 | 2 | 3 | 4 | Total |
|---|---|---|---|---|---|
| Badgers | 0 | 0 | 0 | 7 | 7 |
| No. 6 Ducks | 0 | 7 | 7 | 7 | 21 |

at Autzen Stadium • Eugene, Oregon

- Date: October 25
- Game time: 4:00 p.m.
- Game weather: Rain, 51 °F (11 °C); Wind: S 18 mph
- Game attendance: 58,940
- Referee: Jason Nickelby
- TV announcers (FS1): Tim Brando (play-by-play), Devin Gardner (analyst), and Josh Sims (sideline reporter)

Game information

First quarter

- No scoring plays.

Second quarter

- ORE – Jordon Davison 3-yard run (Atticus Sappington kick), 1:07. Oregon 7–0. 16 plays, 99 yards, 8:24.

Third quarter

- ORE – Jordon Davison 20-yard run (Atticus Sappington kick), 12:14. Oregon 14–0. 6 plays, 75 yards, 2:46.

Fourth quarter

- ORE – Gernorris Wilson 1-yard pass from Brock Thomas (Atticus Sappington kick), 14:17 Oregon 21–0 Drive: 5 plays, 54 yards, 2:44.
- WIS – Lance Mason 2-yard pass from Hunter Simmons (Nathanial Vakos kick), 7:57 Oregon 21–7 Drive: 12 plays, 78 yards, 6:14.

| Statistics | WIS | ORE |
|---|---|---|
| First downs | 11 | 19 |
| Plays–yards | 50–196 | 64–335 |
| Rushes–yards | 29–110 | 45–203 |
| Passing yards | 86 | 132 |
| Passing: comp–att–int | 7–21–1 | 13–19–0 |
| Turnovers | 1 | 0 |
| Time of possession | 25:03 | 34:57 |

| Team | Category | Player | Statistics |
|---|---|---|---|
| Wisconsin | Passing | Hunter Simmons | 7/21, 86 yards, TD, INT |
| Wisconsin | Rushing | Gideon Ituka | 21 carries, 85 yards |
| Wisconsin | Receiving | Eugene Hilton Jr. | 1 reception, 42 yards |
| Oregon | Passing | Dante Moore | 9/15, 86 yards |
| Oregon | Rushing | Jordon Davison | 16 carries, 102 yards, 2 TD |
| Oregon | Receiving | Dakorien Moore | 3 receptions, 45 yards |

=== at No. 20 Iowa ===
No. 9 Oregon Ducks (7–1) at No. 20 Iowa Hawkeyes (6–2) – Game summary

| Quarter | 1 | 2 | 3 | 4 | Total |
|---|---|---|---|---|---|
| No. 9 Ducks | 2 | 10 | 3 | 3 | 18 |
| No. 20 Hawkeyes | 0 | 7 | 0 | 9 | 16 |

at Kinnick Stadium • Iowa City, Iowa

- Date: November 8
- Game time: 12:30 p.m.
- Game weather: Rain, 42 °F (6 °C); Wind: N 7 mph
- Game attendance: 69,250
- Referee: Jeff Servinski
- TV announcers (CBS): Brad Nessler (play-by-play), Gary Danielson (analyst), and Jenny Dell (sideline reporter)

Game information

First quarter

- ORE – Safety, 9:55. Ducks 2–0.

Second quarter

- ORE – Dierre Hill Jr 19-yard run (Atticus Sappington kick), 11:46. Ducks 9–0. 8 plays, 82 yards, 4:00.
- IOWA – DJ Vonnahme 3-yard pass from Mark Gronowski (Drew Stevens kick), 5:43. Ducks 9–7. 10 plays, 75 yards, 6:03.
- ORE – Atticus Sappington 46-yard field goal, 0:00. Ducks 12–7. 8 plays, 52 yards, 1:43.

Third quarter

- ORE – Atticus Sappington 40-yard field goal, 0:44. Ducks 15–7. 9 plays, 65 yards, 6:02.

Fourth quarter

- IOWA – Drew Stevens 58-yard field goal, 12:39. Ducks 15–10. 7 plays, 35 yards, 3:05.
- IOWA – Mark Gronowski 3-yard run (Wetjen pass from Gronowski failed), 1:51. Hawkeyes 16–15. 12 plays, 93 yards, 6:45.
- ORE – Atticus Sappington 39-yard field goal, 0:03. Ducks 18–16. 10 plays, 54 yards, 1:48.

| Statistics | ORE | IOWA |
|---|---|---|
| First downs | 19 | 18 |
| Plays–yards | 57–373 | 61–239 |
| Rushes–yards | 36–261 | 43–101 |
| Passing yards | 112 | 138 |
| Passing: comp–att–int | 13–21–1 | 10–18–0 |
| Turnovers | 1 | 2 |
| Time of possession | 26:40 | 33:20 |

| Team | Category | Player | Statistics |
|---|---|---|---|
| Oregon | Passing | Dante Moore | 13/21, 112 yards, INT |
| Oregon | Rushing | Noah Whittington | 17 carries, 118 yards |
| Oregon | Receiving | Jamari Johnson | 4 receptions, 36 yards |
| Iowa | Passing | Mark Gronowski | 10/18, 138 yards, TD |
| Iowa | Rushing | Kamari Moulton | 23 carries, 87 yards |
| Iowa | Receiving | DJ Vonnahme | 2 receptions, 43 yards, TD |

=== vs Minnesota ===
Minnesota Golden Gophers (6–3) at No. 8 Oregon Ducks (8–1) – Game summary

| Quarter | 1 | 2 | 3 | 4 | Total |
|---|---|---|---|---|---|
| Golden Gophers | 0 | 6 | 7 | 0 | 13 |
| No. 8 Ducks | 14 | 14 | 7 | 7 | 42 |

at Autzen Stadium • Eugene, Oregon

- Date: November 14
- Game time: 6:00 p.m.
- Game weather:
- Game attendance: 58,830
- Referee: Francisco Villar
- TV announcers (FOX): Jason Benetti (play-by-play), Robert Griffin III (analyst), and Alexa Landestoy (sideline reporter)

Game information

First quarter

- ORE – Jordon Davison 1-yard run (Atticus Sappington kick), 10:48. Ducks 7–0. Drive: 9 plays, 75 yards, 4:12.
- ORE – Jordon Davison 39-yard run (Atticus Sappington kick), 7:23. Ducks 14–0. Drive: 4 plays, 66 yards, 2:00.

Second quarter

- MINN – Brady Denaburg 46-yard field goal, 11:39. Ducks 14–3. Drive: 7 plays, 14 yards, 3:15.
- ORE – Noah Whittington 40-yard run (Atticus Sappington kick), 9:31. Ducks 21–3. Drive: 4 plays, 75 yards, 2:08.
- MINN – Brady Denaburg 26-yard field goal, 2:25. Ducks 21–6. Drive: 13 plays, 76 yards, 7:06.
- ORE – Kenyon Sadiq 3-yard pass from Dante Moore (Gage Hurych kick), 0:37. Ducks 28–6. Drive: 8 plays, 75 yards, 1:48.

Third quarter

- MINN – Javon Tracy 10-yard pass from Drake Lindsey (Brady Denaburg kick), 8:17. Ducks 28–13. Drive: 10 plays, 80 yards, 6:38.
- ORE – Jeremiah McClellan 13-yard pass from Dante Moore (Atticus Sappington kick), 2:52. Ducks 35–13. Drive: 11 plays, 75 yards, 5:25.

Fourth quarter

- ORE – Jay Harris 12-yard run (Atticus Sappington kick), 11:09. Ducks 42–13. Drive: 7 plays, 70 yards, 3:06.

| Statistics | MINN | ORE |
|---|---|---|
| First downs | 13 | 27 |
| Plays–yards | 57–200 | 63–510 |
| Rushes–yards | 24–62 | 30–179 |
| Passing yards | 138 | 331 |
| Passing: comp–att–int | 19–33–0 | 30–33–0 |
| Turnovers | 0 | 1 |
| Time of possession | 30:24 | 29:36 |

| Team | Category | Player | Statistics |
|---|---|---|---|
| Minnesota | Passing | Drake Lindsey | 19/32, 138 yards, TD |
| Minnesota | Rushing | Darius Taylor | 10 carries, 57 yards |
| Minnesota | Receiving | Darius Taylor | 4 receptions, 40 yards |
| Oregon | Passing | Dante Moore | 27/30, 306 yards, 2 TD |
| Oregon | Rushing | Noah Whittington | 8 carries, 72 yards, TD |
| Oregon | Receiving | Kenyon Sadiq | 8 receptions, 96 yards, TD |

=== vs No. 15 USC (rivalry) ===
No. 15 USC Trojans (8–2) at No. 7 Oregon Ducks (9–1) – Game summary

| Quarter | 1 | 2 | 3 | 4 | Total |
|---|---|---|---|---|---|
| No. 15 Trojans | 7 | 7 | 7 | 6 | 27 |
| No. 7 Ducks | 14 | 14 | 7 | 7 | 42 |

at Autzen Stadium • Eugene, Oregon

- Date: November 22
- Game time: 12:30 p.m.
- Game weather: Sunny • Temperature: 45 °F (7 °C) • Wind: 0 miles per hour (0 km/h)
- Game attendance: 59,588
- Referee: Bryan Banks
- TV announcers (CBS): Brad Nessler (play-by-play), Gary Danielson (analyst), and Jenny Dell (sideline reporter)

Game information

First quarter

- (9:54) USC – Makai Lemon 8-yard pass from Jayden Maiava (Ryon Sayeri kick),(Drive: 11 plays, 75 yards, 5:06; USC 7–0)
- (7:05) ORE – Jordon Davison 11-yard run(Atticus Sappington kick),(Drive: 6 plays, 65 yards, 2:49; Tied 7–7)
- (1:31) ORE – Kenyon Sadiq 8-yard pass from Dante Moore (Atticus Sappington kick), (Drive: 11 plays, 67 yards, ORE 14–7)

Second quarter

- (14:52) USC – Tanook Hines 24-yard pass from Makai Lemon (Ryon Sayeri kick), (Drive: 5 plays, 75 yards, 1:39; Tied 14–14)
- (9:58) ORE – Malik Benson 85-yard punt return (Atticus Sappington kick), (Drive: 6 plays, 20 yards, 2:44; ORE 21–14)
- (1:52) ORE – Bryce Bottecher 1-yard run (Atticus Sappington kick), (Drive: 12 plays, 56 yards, 5:56; ORE 28–14)

Third quarter

- (5:48) USC – Makai Lemon 4-yard pass from Jayden Maiava (Ryon Sayeri kick), (Drive: 9 plays, 52 yards, 4:36; ORE 28–21)
- (2:13) ORE – Kenyon Sadiq 27-yard pass from Dante Moore (Atticus Sappington kick), (Drive: 7 plays, 75 yards, 3:35; ORE 35–21)

Fourth quarter

- (11:32) USC – Lake McRee 9-yard pass from Jayden Maiava (Drive: 4 plays, 58 yards, 2:02; ORE 35–27)
- (5:30) ORE – Noah Whittington 9-yard run (Atticus Sappington kick), (Drive: 11 plays, 79 yards, 5:58; ORE 42–27)

| Statistics | USC | ORE |
|---|---|---|
| First downs | 23 | 26 |
| Plays–yards | 72–382 | 71–436 |
| Rushes–yards | 28–52 | 41–179 |
| Passing yards | 330 | 257 |
| Passing: comp–att–int | 26–44–2 | 22–30–1 |
| Turnovers | 2 | 1 |
| Time of possession | 26:56 | 33:04 |

| Team | Category | Player | Statistics |
|---|---|---|---|
| USC | Passing | Jayden Maiava | 25/43, 306 yards, 3 TD, 2 INT |
| USC | Rushing | King Miller | 15 carries, 30 yards |
| USC | Receiving | Makai Lemon | 7 receptions, 34 yards, 2 TD |
| Oregon | Passing | Dante Moore | 22/30, 257 yards, 2 TD, INT |
| Oregon | Rushing | Noah Whittington | 19 carries, 104 yards, TD |
| Oregon | Receiving | Kenyon Sadiq | 6 receptions, 72 yards, 2 TD |

=== at Washington (rivalry) ===
No. 5 Oregon Ducks (10–1) at Washington Huskies (8–3) – Game summary

| Quarter | 1 | 2 | 3 | 4 | Total |
|---|---|---|---|---|---|
| No. 5 Ducks | 3 | 10 | 6 | 7 | 26 |
| Huskies | 0 | 7 | 0 | 7 | 14 |

at Husky Stadium • Seattle, Washington

- Date: November 29
- Game time: 12:30 p.m.
- Game weather: Cloudy
- Game attendance: 72,376
- Referee: Ron Snodgrass
- TV announcers (CBS): Brad Nessler (play-by-play), Gary Danielson (analyst), and Jenny Dell (sideline reporter)

Game information

First quarter

- (11:12) ORE - Atticus Sappington 46-yard field goal (Drive: 7 plays, 43 yards, 1:57; Oregon 3-0)

Second quarter

- (10:54) ORE - Dante Moore 1-yard run (Atticus Sappington kick) (Drive: 14 plays, 80 yards, 6:52; Oregon 10-0)
- (3:18) ORE - Atticus Sappington 32-yard field goal (Drive: 12 plays, 62 yards, 5:53; Oregon 13-0)
- (0:10) WASH - Denzel Boston 3-yard pass from Demond Williams Jr. (Grady Gross kick) (Drive: 12 plays, 75 yards, 3:08; Oregon 13-7)

Third quarter

- (9:07) ORE - Atticus Sappington 37-yard field goal (Drive: 11 plays, 56 yards, 5:53; Oregon 16-7)
- (2:34) ORE - Atticus Sappington 51-yard field goal (Drive: 7 plays, 60 yards, 3:54; Oregon 19-7)

Fourth quarter

- (8:54) WASH - Denzel Boston 13-yard pass from Demond Williams Jr. (Grady Gross kick) (Drive: 13 plays, 69 yards, 5:54; Oregon 19-14)
- (7:55) ORE - Malik Benson 64-yard pass from Dante Moore (Atticus Sappington kick) (Drive: 3 plays, 65 yards, 0:59; Oregon 26-14)

| Statistics | ORE | WASH |
|---|---|---|
| First downs | 17 | 18 |
| Plays–yards | 75–392 | 63–283 |
| Rushes–yards | 42–106 | 33–154 |
| Passing yards | 286 | 129 |
| Passing: comp–att–int | 20–29–0 | 15–30–2 |
| Turnovers | 0 | 2 |
| Time of possession | 34:58 | 25:02 |

| Team | Category | Player | Statistics |
|---|---|---|---|
| Oregon | Passing | Dante Moore | 20/29, 286 yards, TD |
| Oregon | Rushing | Noah Whittington | 17 carries, 47 yards |
| Oregon | Receiving | Malik Benson | 5 receptions, 102 yards, TD |
| Washington | Passing | Demond Williams Jr. | 15/30, 129 yards, 2 TD, 2 INT |
| Washington | Rushing | Adam Mohammed | 14 carries, 105 yards |
| Washington | Receiving | Dezmen Roebuck | 2 receptions, 27 yards |

=== vs. James Madison (CFP First Round) ===
CFP First Round Game
No. 12 James Madison Dukes (12–1) at No. 5 Oregon Ducks (11–1) – Game summary

| Quarter | 1 | 2 | 3 | 4 | Total |
|---|---|---|---|---|---|
| No. 12 Dukes | 3 | 3 | 14 | 14 | 34 |
| No. 5 Ducks | 13 | 21 | 14 | 3 | 51 |

at Autzen Stadium • Eugene, OR

- Date: December 20
- Game time: 4:30 p.m. PST
- Game weather: Cloudy
- Referee: Kyle Olson (SEC)
- TV announcers (TNT): Bob Wischusen (play-by-play), Louis Riddick (analyst), Kris Budden and Stormy Buonantony (sideline reporters)

Game information
First quarter
- ORE – Jamari Johnson 41-yard pass from Dante Moore (run failed), 13:17. Ducks 6–0. Drive: 4 plays, 68 yards, 1:38.
- JMU – Morgan Suarez 30-yard field goal, 5:14. Ducks 6–3. Drive: 15 plays, 63 yards, 8:03.
- ORE – Dante Moore 5-yard run (Atticus Sappington kick), 2:37. Ducks 13–3. Drive: 5 plays, 75 yards, 2:37.

Second quarter

- ORE – Dierre Hill Jr. 56-yard run (Atticus Sappington kick), 11:33. Ducks 20–3. Drive: 3 plays, 78 yards, 1:34.
- ORE – Jeremiah McClellan 20-yard pass from Dante Moore (Atticus Sappington kick), 9:18. Ducks 27–3. Drive: 4 plays, 63 yards, 1:18.
- ORE – Malik Benson 46-yard pass from Dante Moore (Atticus Sappington kick), 4:22. Ducks 34–3. Drive: 5 plays, 80 yards, 1:45.
- JMU – Morgan Suarez 38-yard field goal, 0:06. Ducks 34–6. Drive: 9 plays, 33 yards, 0:54.

Third quarter

- JMU – Nick DeGennaro 47-yard pass from Alonza Barnett III (Morgan Suarez kick), 12:08. Ducks 34–13. Drive: 6 plays, 75 yards, 2:52.
- ORE – Malik Benson 45-yard pass from Dante Moore (Atticus Sappington kick), 10:24. Ducks 41–13. Drive: 4 plays, 76 yards, 1:40.
- ORE – Jayden Limar 15-yard blocked punt return (Atticus Sappington kick), 7:05. Ducks 48–13.
- JMU – George Pettaway 24-yard pass from Alonza Barnett III (Morgan Suarez kick), 1:15. Ducks 48–20. Drive: 4 plays, 36 yards, 1:46.

Fourth quarter

- JMU – Lacota Dippre 2-yard run (pass failed), 10:26. Ducks 48–26. Drive: 9 plays, 89 yards, 3:40.
- ORE – Atticus Sappington 48-yard field goal, 4:22. Ducks 51–26. Drive: 10 plays, 17 yards, 6:04.
- JMU – Alonza Barnett III 1-yard run (Alonza Barnett III pass to Nick DeGennaro), 1:05. Ducks 51–34. Drive: 9 plays, 99 yards, 3:17.

| Statistics | JMU | ORE |
|---|---|---|
| First downs | 23 | 22 |
| Plays–yards | 84–509 | 53–514 |
| Rushes–yards | 35–186 | 26–201 |
| Passing yards | 323 | 313 |
| Passing: Comp–Att–Int | 24–49–0 | 19–27–2 |
| Turnovers | 0 | 2 |
| Time of possession | 35:50 | 24:10 |

| Team | Category | Player | Statistics |
|---|---|---|---|
| James Madison | Passing | Alonza Barnett III | 23/48, 273 yards, 2 TD |
| James Madison | Rushing | Wayne Knight | 17 carries, 110 yards |
| James Madison | Receiving | Nick DeGennaro | 5 receptions, 90 yards, TD |
| Oregon | Passing | Dante Moore | 19/27, 313 yards, 4 TD, 2 INT |
| Oregon | Rushing | Jordan Davison | 10 carries, 90 yards |
| Oregon | Receiving | Malik Benson | 5 receptions, 119 yards, 2 TD |

=== vs. No. 4 Texas Tech (Orange Bowl—CFP Quarterfinal) ===
CFP Quarterfinal at the Capital One Orange Bowl
No. 5 Oregon Ducks (12–1) vs. No. 4 Texas Tech Red Raiders (12–1) – Game summary

| Quarter | 1 | 2 | 3 | 4 | Total |
|---|---|---|---|---|---|
| No. 5 Ducks | 3 | 3 | 7 | 10 | 23 |
| No. 4 Red Raiders | 0 | 0 | 0 | 0 | 0 |

at Hard Rock Stadium • Miami Gardens, FL

- Date: January 1, 2026
- Game time: 9:00 a.m.
- Game attendance: 65,021
- Referee: Jerry Magallanes
- TV announcers (ESPN): Joe Tessitore (play-by-play), Jesse Palmer (analyst), Katie George and Stormy Buonantony (sideline reporters)

Game information
First quarter
- ORE – Atticus Sappington 50-yard field goal, 10:41. Ducks 3–0. Drive: 10 plays, 43 yards, 4:19.

Second quarter

- ORE – Atticus Sappington 39-yard field goal, 1:33. Ducks 6–0. Drive: 4 plays, 9 yards, 0:56.

Third quarter

- ORE – Jordon Davison 6-yard run (Atticus Sappington kick), 11:20. Ducks 13–0. Drive: 1 play, 6 yards, 0:04.

Fourth quarter

- ORE – Atticus Sappington 43-yard field goal, 7:53. Ducks 16–0. Drive: 10 plays, 55 yards, 5:55.
- ORE – Jordon Davison 1-yard run (Atticus Sappington kick), 0:16. Ducks 23–0. Drive: 8 plays, 27 yards, 2:54.

| Statistics | ORE | TTU |
|---|---|---|
| First downs | 16 | 10 |
| Plays–yards | 81–309 | 62–215 |
| Rushes–yards | 47–64 | 30–78 |
| Passing yards | 245 | 137 |
| Passing: comp–att–int | 27–34–1 | 18–32–2 |
| Turnovers | 1 | 4 |
| Time of possession | 38:00 | 22:00 |

| Team | Category | Player | Statistics |
|---|---|---|---|
| Oregon | Passing | Dante Moore | 26/33, 234 yards, INT |
| Oregon | Rushing | Jordon Davison | 15 carries, 42 yards, 2 TD |
| Oregon | Receiving | Jamari Johnson | 4 receptions, 66 yards |
| Texas Tech | Passing | Behren Morton | 18/32, 137 yards, 2 INT |
| Texas Tech | Rushing | Jkoby Williams | 13 carries, 81 yards |
| Texas Tech | Receiving | Terrance Carter Jr. | 9 receptions, 72 yards |

=== vs. No. 1 Indiana (Peach Bowl—CFP Semifinal) ===
CFP Semifinal at the Chick-fil-A Peach Bowl
No. 5 Oregon Ducks (13–1) vs. No. 1 Indiana Hoosiers (14–0) – Game summary

| Quarter | 1 | 2 | 3 | 4 | Total |
|---|---|---|---|---|---|
| No. 5 Ducks | 7 | 0 | 8 | 7 | 22 |
| No. 1 Hoosiers | 14 | 21 | 7 | 14 | 56 |

at Mercedes-Benz Stadium • Atlanta, GA

- Date: January 9, 2026
- Game time: 4:30 p.m.
- Game attendance: 75,604
- TV announcers (ESPN): Sean McDonough (play-by-play), Greg McElroy (analyst), Molly McGrath, Katie George (sideline reporters) and Matt Austin (rules expert)

Game information

First quarter

- IU – D'Angelo Ponds 25-yard interception return (Nico Radicic kick), 14:49. Hoosiers 7–0. Drive: 1 play, 0 yards, 0:08.
- ORE – Jamari Johnson 19-yard pass from Dante Moore (Atticus Sappington kick), 7:11. Tied 7–7. Drive: 14 plays, 75 yards, 7:38.
- IU – Omar Cooper Jr. 8-yard pass from Fernando Mendoza (Nico Radicic kick), 0:40. Hoosiers 14–7. Drive: 4 plays, 34 yards, 1:47.

Second quarter

- IU – Kaelon Black 1-yard run (Nico Radicic kick), 8:17. Hoosiers 21–7. Drive: 3 plays, 3 yards, 1:12.
- IU – Charlie Becker 36-yard pass from Fernando Mendoza (Nico Radicic kick), 3:13. Hoosiers 28–7. Drive: 4 plays, 61 yards, 1:44.
- IU – Elijah Sarratt 2-yard pass from Fernando Mendoza (Nico Radicic kick), 0:59. Hoosiers 35–7. Drive: 6 plays, 19 yards, 1:37.

Third Quarter

- IU – E.J. Williams Jr. 13-yard pass from Fernando Mendoza (Nico Radicic kick), 8:52. Hoosiers 42–7. Drive: 11 plays, 75 yards, 6:08.
- ORE – Jay Harris 2-yard run (Dante Moore pass to Jamari Johnson), 7:50. Hoosiers 42–15. Drive: 2 plays, 75 yards, 1:02.

Fourth quarter

- IU – Elijah Sarratt 3-yard pass from Fernando Mendoza (Nico Radicic kick), 11:36. Hoosiers 49–15. Drive: 3 plays, 4 yards, 1:28.
- IU – Kaelon Black 23-yard run (Nico Radicic kick), 5:13. Hoosiers 56–15. Drive: 5 plays, 65 yards, 3:07.
- ORE – Roger Saleapaga 1-yard pass from Dante Moore (Atticus Sappington kick), 0:22. Hoosiers 56–22. Drive: 12 plays, 75 yards, 4:51.

| Statistics | ORE | IU |
|---|---|---|
| First downs | 20 | 18 |
| Plays–yards | 66-378 | 60-362 |
| Rushes–yards | 26-93 | 40-185 |
| Passing yards | 285 | 177 |
| Passing: comp–att–int | 24-40-1 | 17-20-0 |
| Turnovers | 3 | 0 |
| Time of possession | 28:47 | 31:13 |

| Team | Category | Player | Statistics |
|---|---|---|---|
| Oregon | Passing | Dante Moore | 24/39, 285 yards, 2 TD, INT |
| Oregon | Rushing | Dierre Hill Jr. | 5 carries, 86 yards |
| Oregon | Receiving | Jamari Johnson | 4 receptions, 83 yards, TD |
| Indiana | Passing | Fernando Mendoza | 17/20, 177 yards, 5 TD |
| Indiana | Rushing | Kaelon Black | 12 carries, 63 yards, 2 TD |
| Indiana | Receiving | Elijah Sarratt | 7 receptions, 75 yards, 2 TD |
