= 2026 Peach Bowl =

College football bowl game

2026 Chick-fil-A Peach Bowl
- College Football Playoff Semifinal; 58th Peach Bowl
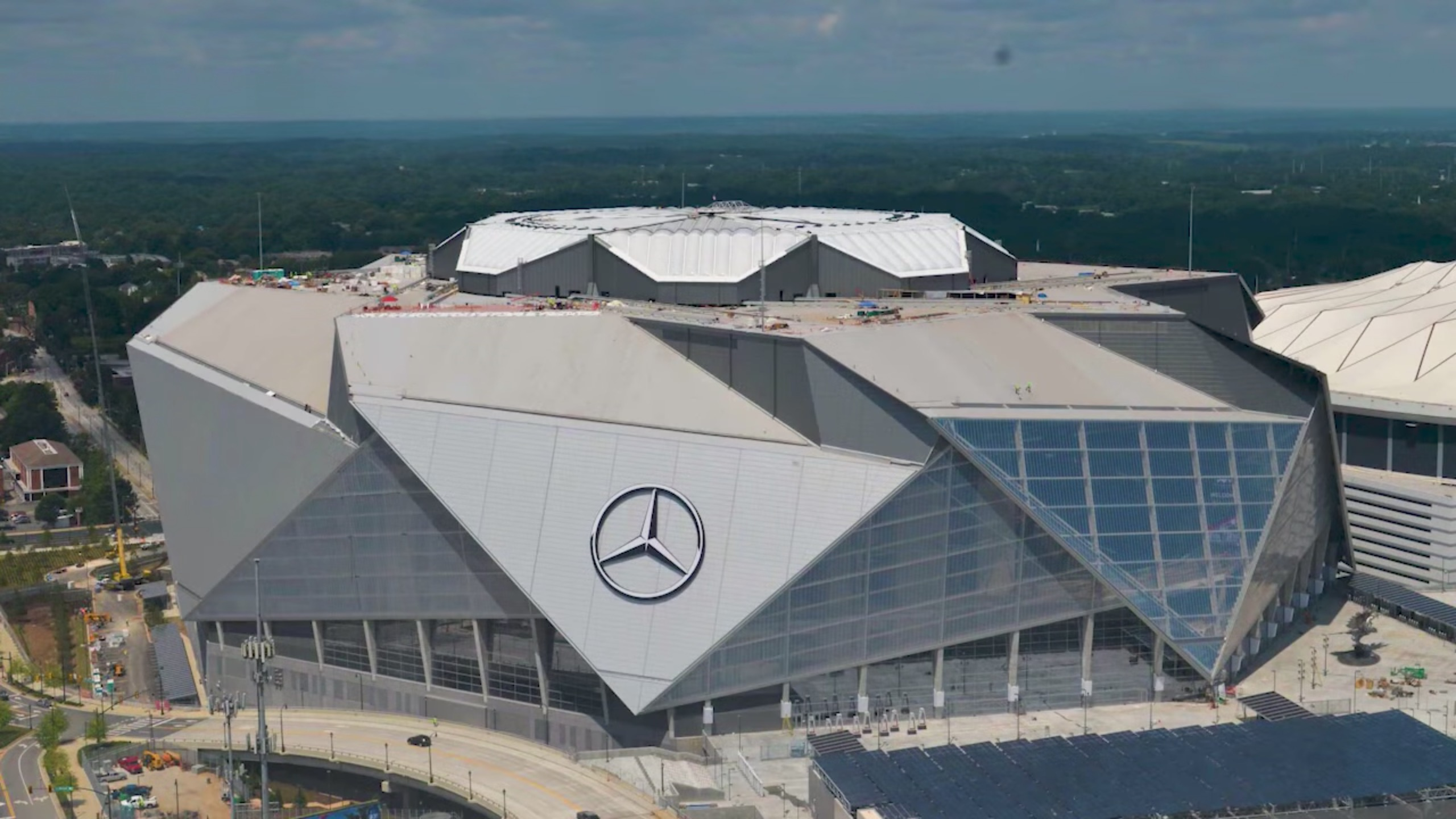
Oregon Ducks	Indiana Hoosiers
(13–1)	(14–0)
Big Ten	Big Ten
22	56
Head coach: Dan Lanning	Head coach: Curt Cignetti
AP / Coaches / CFP; 5 / 5 / 5	AP / Coaches / CFP; 1 / 1 / 1
	1	2	3	4	Total
Oregon	7	0	8	7	22
Indiana	14	21	7	14	56
- Date: January 9, 2026
- Season: 2025
- Stadium: Mercedes-Benz Stadium
- Location: Atlanta, Georgia
- MVP: Offense: Fernando Mendoza (QB, Indiana); Defense: D'Angelo Ponds (CB, Indiana)
- Favorite: Indiana by 3
- National anthem: Indiana University Marching Hundred
- Referee: Daniel Gautreaux (SEC)
- Attendance: 75,604

United States TV coverage
- Network: ESPN
- Announcers: Sean McDonough (play-by-play), Greg McElroy (analyst), Molly McGrath, Katie George (sideline reporters) and Matt Austin (rules expert)

International TV coverage
- Network: ESPN Deportes and ESPN Brazil
- Announcers: ESPN Deportes: Eduardo Varela (play-by-play), Pablo Viruega (analyst) and Carlos Nava (sideline reporter); ESPN Brazil: Conrado Giulietti (play-by-play), Deivis Chiodini (analyst) and Giane Pessoa (rules expert)

The 2026 Peach Bowl was a college football bowl game played on January 9, 2026, at Mercedes-Benz Stadium in Atlanta, Georgia, with kickoff at approximately 7:30 p.m. ET. The 58th annual Peach Bowl game was one of the College Football Playoff (CFP) semifinals and one of the 2025–26 bowl games concluding the 2025 FBS football season. Sponsored by the Chick-fil-A restaurant chain, the game was officially known as the College Football Playoff Semifinal at the Chick-fil-A Peach Bowl.

The Peach Bowl featured two teams from the Big Ten Conference, the Indiana Hoosiers and Oregon Ducks. The Hoosiers defeated the Ducks, 56–22.

== Background ==
The 2026 Peach Bowl was a semifinal game of the College Football Playoff (CFP). The game featured the winner of the Orange Bowl, Oregon, and the winner of the Rose Bowl, Indiana. The winner of this game advanced to the 2026 College Football Playoff National Championship game to face the winner of the Fiesta Bowl, the Miami Hurricanes.

Quarterfinals
Jan 1 – Orange Bowl
4	Texas Tech	0
5	Oregon	23
Jan 1 – Rose Bowl
1	Indiana	38
9	Alabama	3

Peach Bowl
5	Oregon	22
1	Indiana	56

== Teams ==
This CFP semifinal was a neutral-site rematch of a regular-season game played on October 11, 2025, when Indiana, then ranked 7th, defeated Oregon, then ranked 3rd, 30–20 at Autzen Stadium in Eugene. It both snapped the longest home winning streak in the country at the time and was the Hoosiers' first road win over an opponent with a top 5 AP Poll ranking. This was the fifth meeting between the two teams; in their four prior meetings, Oregon won twice (in 1963 and 1964) and Indiana won twice (in 2004 and 2025).

=== Indiana Hoosiers ===
Indiana received a bye into the quarterfinals as the top-seeded team. The Hoosiers were the Big Ten Conference champions with a 13–0 record (9–0 in conference), their first conference title since 1967. In the Rose Bowl, Indiana defeated 9th-seeded Alabama 38–3 to advance to this semifinal. It was the Hoosiers' first bowl win since the 1991 Copper Bowl against Baylor. Indiana was playing its second consecutive game without defensive end Stephen Daley, who led the Big Ten in tackles for loss during the season but suffered a season-ending injury while celebrating the Hoosiers' Big Ten Championship Game victory over Ohio State.

=== Oregon Ducks ===
Oregon compiled an 11–1 regular-season record; their only loss was a 10-point defeat to Indiana in mid-October. The Ducks were seeded fifth in the playoff, and hosted the 12th seed, James Madison, on December 20. Oregon advanced to the quarterfinal round by defeating James Madison, 51–34. In the Orange Bowl, Oregon defeated fourth-seeded Texas Tech, 23–0, to advance to this semifinal. Oregon's leading rusher Jordon Davison suffered an upper-body injury the Orange Bowl and was listed as out for the Peach Bowl, and the Ducks' second-leading rusher Noah Whittington was first appeared on the injury report the day before the game with a turf toe injury; Whittington appeared briefly in the Peach Bowl but did not record any touches.

== Game summary ==
College Football Playoff Semifinal at the 2026 Chick-fil-A Peach Bowl

Quarter	1	2	3	4	Total
(5) No. 5 Oregon	7	0	8	7	22
(1) No. 1 Indiana	14	21	7	14	56

at Mercedes-Benz Stadium • Atlanta, Georgia

- Date: Friday, January 9, 2026
- Game time: 7:30 p.m. EST
- Game weather: Sunny (Indoor venue, roof closed)
- Game attendance: 75,604
- Referee: Daniel Gautreaux
- TV announcers (ESPN): Sean McDonough (play-by-play), Greg McElroy (analyst), Molly McGrath and Katie George (sideline reporters)

=== First half ===
In front of a crowd of mainly their own fans, Indiana won the coin toss and elected to defer their choice to the second half. On the first play from scrimmage, Oregon quarterback Dante Moore threw a pass intended for Malik Benson on a short out route that was intercepted by Hoosier cornerback D'Angelo Ponds and returned for a touchdown and an immediate 7–0 Indiana lead. Oregon responded with a 14-play, 75-yard touchdown drive that featured three third-down conversions, including the 19-yard touchdown pass from Moore to tight end Jamari Johnson on 3rd down and 12 that tied the game at 7. Indiana followed with its own 75-yard touchdown drive that included two third-down pickups, culminating in an eight-yard strike from quarterback Fernando Mendoza to wide receiver Omar Cooper Jr. with 40 seconds remaining in the first quarter to regain the lead at 14–7.

Indiana forced an Oregon three-and-out on the subsequent drive; Indiana punted the ball back to Oregon after the Ducks recorded a 20-yard sack of Mendoza on third down and forced a fumble that Mendoza recovered himself. However, on the first play of Oregon's next drive from its own 13-yard line, the Ducks called a run-pass option play; Moore initially faked a handoff to backup running back Dierre Hill Jr. before attempting a quick pass to the sideline, but Moore's arm contacted Hill as he was winding up to throw, resulting in a fumble that Indiana defensive lineman Mario Landino recovered on the Oregon 3-yard line. Three plays later, Hoosier running back Kaelon Black scored on a one-yard touchdown run to make the score 21–7 Indiana. After Indiana recorded back-to-back sacks on the following drive and forced Oregon to punt again, the Hoosiers drove 61 yards in four plays, scoring on a 36-yard touchdown pass from Mendoza to receiver Charlie Becker for a 28–7 lead with 3:13 remaining in the first half. On the third play of the Ducks' next drive, Indiana's Daniel Ndukwe, starting for the injured Stephen Daley, recorded a strip sack of Moore that was recovered by Landino for his second fumble recovery of the day. Starting on Oregon's 21-yard line, Indiana scored a touchdown on the drive's sixth play, a two-yard pass from Mendoza to receiver Elijah Sarratt, to go up 35–7 with just over a minute remaining in the half. Oregon drove the ball from its own 25-yard line 37 yards to the Indiana 38-yard line in the half's final minute, but kicker Atticus Sappington came up short on what would have been a career-long 58-yard field goal attempt as the half expired, keeping the score 35–7 at the break.

=== Second half ===
Indiana took the opening kickoff of the second half and drove the ball 75 yards in 11 plays; on a third down in Oregon territory, Mendoza scrambled for the first down and fumbled for the second time; once again Indiana's offense recovered their fumble, this time from center Pat Coogan who was trailing the play. Indiana scored its sixth touchdown of the game on a 13-yard touchdown pass from Mendoza to receiver E.J. Williams Jr. to increase the lead to 42–7. Oregon broke Indiana's string of 35 unanswered points with a two-play, 75-yard drive that featured a 71-yard run from Hill; then after a penalty, a two-yard touchdown run from running back Jay Harris. A successful two-point conversion made the score 42–15. Oregon forced Indiana's second punt of the game, but had its subsequent drive stall when Harris was tackled for a loss on fourth down in Indiana territory with under four minutes to play in the third quarter. Both teams punted on their next drives, but Oregon's punt deep in its own territory was blocked by Ndukwe and returned to the Oregon 7-yard line. Indiana scored on third-and-goal from three yards out on a pass from Mendoza to Sarratt to make the score 49–15. Indiana stopped Oregon for a second time on downs in Hoosier territory, then responded with five consecutive runs, the final one being a 23-yard touchdown run from Black for a 56–15 Hoosier lead. Oregon mounted one final 75-yard touchdown drive, ending with Moore's one-yard touchdown pass to tight end Roger Saleapaga with 22 seconds left to make the final margin 56–22.

For the second consecutive postseason game, Hoosier quarterback Fernando Mendoza threw for more touchdowns (5) than incompletions (3). Beforehand, the only quarterback to have done so in a CFP game had been Tua Tagovailoa for Alabama against Oklahoma in the 2018 Orange Bowl semifinal (4 touchdowns to 3 incompletions).

== Statistics ==
Team statistical comparison
Statistic	Oregon	Indiana
First downs	20	18
First downs rushing		
First downs passing		
First downs penalty		
Third down efficiency	8–13	11–14
Fourth down efficiency	0–2	0–0
Total plays–net yards	66–378	60–362
Rushing attempts–net yards	26–93	40–185
Yards per rush	3.6	4.6
Yards passing	285	177
Pass completions–attempts	24–40	17–20
Interceptions thrown	1	0
Punt returns–total yards	2–11	2–23
Kickoff returns–total yards	1–15	0–0
Punts–average yardage	2–48.0	3–47.3
Fumbles–lost	3–2	1–0
Penalties–yards	5–43	5–23
Time of possession	28:47	31:13

Oregon statistics
Ducks passing
	C–A	Yds	TD–INT
Dante Moore	24–39	285	2–1
Ducks rushing
	Car	Yds	TD
Dierre Hill Jr.	5	86	0
Jay Harris	16	35	1
Dante Moore	5	-28	0
Ducks receiving
	Rec	Yds	TD
Jamari Johnson	4	83	1
Jeremiah McClellan	5	64	0
Jay Harris	3	32	0
Kenyon Sadiq	5	29	0
Dakorien Moore	2	28	0
Dierre Hill Jr.	2	25	0
Malik Benson	2	23	0
Roger Saleapaga	1	1	1

Indiana statistics
Hoosiers passing
	C–A	Yds	TD–INT
Fernando Mendoza	17–20	177	5–0
Hoosiers rushing
	Car	Yds	TD
Kaelon Black	12	63	2
Roman Hemby	17	53	0
Khobie Martin	4	42	0
Fernando Mendoza	6	28	0
Team	1	-1	0
Hoosiers receiving
	Rec	Yds	TD
Elijah Sarratt	7	75	2
Charlie Becker	2	48	1
Riley Nowakowski	2	18	0
Omar Cooper Jr.	3	17	1
E.J. Williams Jr.	1	13	1
D'Angelo Ponds	1	6	0
Roman Hemby	1	0	0

== See also ==
- List of college football post-season games that were rematches of regular season games
