= 2026 Orange Bowl =

Postseason college football bowl game

2026 Capital One Orange Bowl
- College Football Playoff Quarterfinal; 92nd Orange Bowl
Oregon Ducks	Texas Tech Red Raiders
(12–1)	(12–1)
Big Ten	Big 12
23	0
Head coach: Dan Lanning	Head coach: Joey McGuire
AP / Coaches / CFP; 5 / 5 / 5	AP / Coaches / CFP; 4 / 4 / 4
	1	2	3	4	Total
Oregon	3	3	7	10	23
Texas Tech	0	0	0	0	0
- Date: January 1, 2026
- Season: 2025
- Stadium: Hard Rock Stadium
- Location: Miami Gardens, Florida
- MVP: Dante Moore (Oregon, QB); Brandon Finney Jr. (Oregon, CB)
- Favorite: Oregon by 2.5
- National anthem: Krystal Molina
- Referee: Jerry Magallanes (ACC)
- Halftime show: Third Eye Blind
- Attendance: 65,021

United States TV coverage
- Network: ESPN
- Announcers: Joe Tessitore (play-by-play), Jesse Palmer (analyst), Katie George and Stormy Buonantony (sideline reporters)
- Nielsen ratings: 15.9 million viewers

The 2026 Orange Bowl was a college football bowl game played on January 1, 2026, at Hard Rock Stadium in Miami Gardens, Florida. The 92nd annual Orange Bowl game was one of the 2025–26 bowl games concluding the 2025 FBS football season. The Orange Bowl was one of the College Football Playoff (CFP) quarterfinal games, with the winner, Oregon, advancing to the semifinals. The game began at approximately 12:00 p.m. EST and aired on ESPN. Sponsored by bank holding company Capital One, the game was officially known as the College Football Playoff Quarterfinal at the Capital One Orange Bowl.

The Oregon Ducks of the Big Ten Conference shutout the Texas Tech Red Raiders of the Big 12 Conference, 23–0.

== Background ==
The 2026 Orange Bowl was a quarterfinal game for the 2025–26 College Football Playoff (CFP). Texas Tech, being one of the top four teams in the final CFP rankings, received a bye in the playoff format and was selected to play in a quarterfinal game, the Orange Bowl. Oregon, the number 5 seed in the tournament, defeated James Madison (JMU), the number 12 seed, in the first round, 51–34, to advance to this game.

The winning team advanced to the CFP semifinals, to face the winner of the Rose Bowl in the Peach Bowl.

First round			Orange Bowl
			4	Texas Tech	0
12	James Madison	34	5	Oregon	23
5	Oregon	51

== Teams ==
This was the fourth all-time meeting between Oregon and Texas Tech. Oregon led the series, 3–0, with their last win in 2023. This was the first appearance in the Orange Bowl for both teams.

=== Texas Tech Red Raiders ===
Texas Tech entered the game as the Big 12 Conference champions with a 12–1 record (8–1 in conference). Their only loss was a four-point defeat to Arizona State in mid-October. Ranked fourth in the final CFP poll, the Red Raiders received the fourth seed in the playoff bracket, and a first-round bye.

=== Oregon Ducks ===
Oregon compiled an 11–1 regular-season record; their only loss was a 10-point defeat to Indiana in mid-October. The Ducks were seeded fifth in the playoff, and hosted the 12th seed, James Madison, on December 20. Oregon advanced to the Orange Bowl by defeating James Madison, 51–34.

== Game summary ==
College Football Playoff Quarterfinal at the 2026 Orange Bowl

Quarter	1	2	3	4	Total
(5) No. 5 Oregon	3	3	7	10	23
(4) No. 4 Texas Tech	0	0	0	0	0

at Hard Rock Stadium • Miami Gardens, Florida

- Date: Thursday January 1, 2026
- Game time: 12:00 p.m. EST
- Game weather: Sunny • Temperature: 64 °F (18 °C)
- Game attendance: 65,021
- Referee: Jerry Magallanes (ACC)
- TV announcers (ESPN): Joe Tessitore (play-by-play), Jesse Palmer (analyst), Katie George and Stormy Buonantony (sideline reporters)

The first New Year's Day quarterfinal game was the Orange Bowl between No. 5 Oregon and No. 4 Texas Tech. This was the teams' fourth meeting; Oregon had won each of the previous three, most recently in 2023. The game marked Oregon's third CFP appearance and both teams' first appearance in the Orange Bowl.

Oregon concluded their first drive with a score on a 50-yard field goal by Atticus Sappington. They reached the Texas Tech 23-yard line on their second drive but turned the ball over on downs. Texas Tech went three-and-out on each of their first two drives; following Oregon's first punt early in the second quarter, Behren Morton's pass was intercepted by Brandon Finney Jr. at the Texas Tech 33-yard line. The Red Raiders later drove to the Oregon 33-yard line but Stone Harrington's 54-yard field goal attempt was unsuccessful. A fumble by Cameron Dickey gave Oregon the ball on the Texas Tech 29-yard line with two minutes remaining, and the Ducks finished that possession with a 39-yard Sappington field goal to lead 6–0.

Texas Tech fumbled for the second time early in the third quarter; the ball was recovered by Matayo Uiagalelei and Oregon scored one play later on a Jordon Davison rush. Three of Texas Tech's final four drives ended with a turnover on downs, with the exception coming on another interception by Finney, this time in the end zone, with 13:42 remaining in the fourth quarter. An Oregon drive late in the third ended when Dante Moore pass was intercepted by Ben Roberts, after which the Ducks scored on two of their final three drives. Their possession stemming from the last Finney interception resulted in a 43-yard Sappington field goal, though Sappington missed a 36-yard kick on the next drive. With ten seconds remaining, Davison rushed for a 1-yard touchdown to push Oregon's lead to the eventual final score of 23–0. The game was the first CFP shutout since Clemson defeated Ohio State, 31–0, in the 2016 Fiesta Bowl semifinal.

Scoring summary

Quarter	Time	Drive			Team	Scoring information	Score	
Quarter	Time	Plays	Yards	TOP	Team	Scoring information	Oregon	Texas Tech
1	10:41	10	43	4:19	Oregon	50-yard field goal by Atticus Sappington	3	0
2	1:33	4	8	0:56	Oregon	39-yard field goal by Atticus Sappington	6	0
3	11:20	1	6	0:04	Oregon	Jordon Davison 6-yard touchdown run, Atticus Sappington kick good	13	0
4	7:53	10	55	5:55	Oregon	43-yard field goal by Atticus Sappington	16	0
4	0:16	8	28	2:54	Oregon	Jordon Davison 1-yard touchdown run, Atticus Sappington kick good	23	0
"TOP" = time of possession. For other American football terms, see Glossary of American football.							23	0

== Statistics ==
Team statistical comparison
Statistic	Oregon	Texas Tech
First downs	16	9
First downs rushing	3	4
First downs passing	11	5
First downs penalty	2	0
Third down efficiency	4–19	6–16
Fourth down efficiency	4–8	0–3
Total plays–net yards	81–309	62–215
Rushing attempts–net yards	47–64	30–78
Yards per rush	1.4	2.6
Yards passing	245	137
Pass completions–attempts	27–34	18–32
Interceptions thrown	1	2
Punt returns–total yards	1–28	0–0
Kickoff returns–total yards	0–0	2–35
Punts–average yardage	2–36.0	4–44.5
Fumbles–lost	3–0	2–2
Penalties–yards	3–25	6–36
Time of possession	37:23	20:34

Oregon statistics
Ducks passing
	C–A	Yds	TD–INT
Dante Moore	26–33	234	0–1
James Ferguson-Reynolds	1–1	11	0–0
Ducks rushing
	Car	Yds	TD
Jordon Davison	15	42	2
Noah Whittington	13	31	0
Dierre Hill	5	13	0
Jayden Limar	3	3	0
Dante Moore	10	−12	0
TEAM	1	−13	0
Ducks receiving
	Rec	Yds	TD
Jamari Johnson	4	66	0
Malik Benson	5	51	0
Jayden Limar	1	27	0
Kenyon Sadiq	4	22	0
Dakorien Moore	3	21	0
Jordon Davison	1	14	0
Jeremiah McClellan	2	13	0
Teitum Tuioti	1	11	0
Noah Whittington	2	10	0
Gary Bryant Jr.	1	7	0
Dierre Hill	3	3	0

Texas Tech statistics
Red Raiders passing
	C–A	Yds	TD–INT
Behren Morton	18–32	137	0–2
Red Raiders rushing
	Car	Yds	TD
J'Koby Williams	13	81	0
Cameron Dickey	11	29	0
Behren Morton	6	−32	0
Red Raiders receiving
	Rec	Yds	TD
Terrance Carter Jr.	9	72	0
Reggie Virgil	2	29	0
J'Koby Williams	5	17	0
Coy Eakin	1	11	0
Cameron Dickey	1	8	0
