= List of Oregon Ducks bowl games =

The Oregon Ducks college football team competes as part of the NCAA Division I Football Bowl Subdivision (FBS), representing the University of Oregon in the Big Ten conference. Since the establishment of the team in 1893, Oregon has appeared in 37 bowl games. Included in these games are 8 combined appearances in the traditional "big four" bowl games (the Rose, Sugar, Cotton, and Orange) and 3 Bowl Championship Series (BCS) game appearances, including one in the BCS National Championship Game. Through the history of the program, 7 separate coaches have led the Ducks to bowl games with Mike Bellotti having the most appearances with 12. From 2009 to 2012, Chip Kelly was Oregon's head coach, and led the Ducks to BCS bowl appearances in each of his four seasons at Oregon. After losses in both the 2010 Rose Bowl and the 2011 BCS National Championship Game, Kelly led the Ducks to a victory in the 2012 Rose Bowl over Wisconsin and in the 2013 Fiesta Bowl over Kansas State. Oregon has played in 40 bowl games and has a overall bowl record of 18 wins and 22 losses, and their most common bowl opponent has been Ohio State, meeting a total of 4 times against the Buckeyes

== Key ==
General
†	Bowl game record attendance
‡	Former bowl game record attendance
*	National championship game

Results
W	Win
L	Loss

== Post-season games ==
List of bowl games showing bowl played in, score, date, season, opponent, stadium, location, attendance and head coach (Note: Statistics correct as of 2013–14 NCAA football bowl games.)
#	Bowl	Score (Note: Results are sortable first by whether the result was an Oregon win, loss or tie and then second by the margin of victory.)	Date	Season (Note: Links to the season article for the Oregon team that competed in the bowl for that year.)	Opponent (Note: Links to the season article for the opponent that Oregon competed against in the bowl for that year when available or to their general page when unavailable.)	Stadium	Location	Attendance	Head coach
1	Rose Bowl	W 14–0	January 1, 1917	1916	Penn Quakers	Tournament Park	Pasadena	27,000^{‡}	Hugo Bezdek
2	Rose Bowl	L 6–7	January 1, 1920	1919	Harvard Crimson	Tournament Park	Pasadena	35,000^{‡}	Charles A. Huntington
3	Cotton Bowl Classic	L 13–21	January 1, 1949	1948	No. 10 SMU Mustangs	Cotton Bowl	Dallas	43,000	Jim Aiken
4	Rose Bowl	L 7–10	January 1, 1958	1957	No. 2 Ohio State Buckeyes	Rose Bowl	Pasadena	98,202	Len Casanova
5	Liberty Bowl	L 12–41	December 20, 1960	1960	No. 16 Penn State Nittany Lions	Philadelphia Municipal Stadium	Philadelphia	16,624	Len Casanova
6	Sun Bowl	W 21–14	December 31, 1963	1963	SMU Mustangs	Sun Bowl	El Paso	26,500^{‡}	Len Casanova
7	Independence Bowl	W 27–24	December 16, 1989	1989	Tulsa Golden Hurricane	Independence Stadium	Shreveport	30,333	Rich Brooks
8	Freedom Bowl	L 31–32	December 29, 1990	1990	Colorado State Rams	Anaheim Stadium	Anaheim	41,450	Rich Brooks
9	Independence Bowl	L 35–39	December 31, 1992	1992	Wake Forest Demon Deacons	Independence Stadium	Shreveport	31,337	Rich Brooks
10	Rose Bowl	L 20–38	January 2, 1995	1994	No. 2 Penn State Nittany Lions	Rose Bowl	Pasadena	102,247	Rich Brooks
11	Cotton Bowl Classic	L 6–36	January 1, 1996	1995	No. 7 Colorado Buffaloes	Cotton Bowl	Dallas	58,214	Mike Bellotti
12	Las Vegas Bowl	W 41–13	December 20, 1997	1997	No. 23 Air Force Falcons	Sam Boyd Stadium	Whitney	21,514^{‡}	Mike Bellotti
BCS Era
13	Aloha Classic	L 43–51	December 25, 1998	1998	Colorado Buffaloes	Aloha Stadium	Honolulu	46,451	Mike Bellotti
14	Sun Bowl	W 24–20	December 31, 1999	1999	No. 12 Minnesota Golden Gophers	Sun Bowl	El Paso	48,757	Mike Bellotti
15	Holiday Bowl	W 35–30	December 29, 2000	2000	No. 12 Texas Longhorns	Qualcomm Stadium	San Diego	63,278	Mike Bellotti
16	Fiesta Bowl	W 38–16	January 1, 2002	2001	No. 3 Colorado Buffaloes	Sun Devil Stadium	Tempe	74,118	Mike Bellotti
17	Seattle Bowl	L 17–38	December 30, 2002	2002	Wake Forest Demon Deacons	Qwest Field	Seattle	38,241	Mike Bellotti
18	Sun Bowl	L 30–31	December 31, 2003	2003	No. 24 Minnesota Golden Gophers	Sun Bowl	El Paso	49,894	Mike Bellotti
19	Holiday Bowl	L 14–17	December 29, 2005	2005	No. 23 Oklahoma Sooners	Qualcomm Stadium	San Diego	65,416	Mike Bellotti
20	Las Vegas Bowl	L 8–38	December 21, 2006	2006	No. 19 BYU Cougars	Sam Boyd Stadium	Whitney	44,615^{†}	Mike Bellotti
21	Sun Bowl	W 56–21	December 31, 2007	2007	No. 21 South Florida Bulls	Sun Bowl	El Paso	49,867	Mike Bellotti
22	Holiday Bowl	W 42–31	December 30, 2008	2008	No. 13 Oklahoma State Cowboys	Qualcomm Stadium	San Diego	59,106	Mike Bellotti
23	Rose Bowl	L 17–26	January 1, 2010	2009	No. 8 Ohio State Buckeyes	Rose Bowl	Pasadena	93,963	Chip Kelly
24	BCS National Championship Game*	L 19–22	January 10, 2011	2010	No. 1 Auburn Tigers	University of Phoenix Stadium	Glendale	78,603	Chip Kelly
25	Rose Bowl	W 45–38	January 2, 2012	2011	No. 9 Wisconsin Badgers	Rose Bowl	Pasadena	91,245	Chip Kelly
26	Fiesta Bowl	W 35–17	January 3, 2013	2012	No. 5 Kansas State Wildcats	University of Phoenix Stadium	Glendale	70,242	Chip Kelly
27	Alamo Bowl	W 30–7	December 30, 2013	2013	Texas Longhorns	Alamodome	San Antonio	65,918	Mark Helfrich
College Football Playoff Era
28	Rose Bowl (CFP Semifinal)	W 59–20	January 1, 2015	2014	No. 2 Florida State Seminoles	Rose Bowl	Pasadena	91,322	Mark Helfrich
29	CFP National Championship*	L 20–42	January 12, 2015	2014	No. 4 Ohio State Buckeyes	AT&T Stadium	Arlington	85,689	Mark Helfrich
30	Alamo Bowl	L 41–47 3OT	January 2, 2016	2015	No. 11 TCU Horned Frogs	Alamodome	San Antonio	64,569	Mark Helfrich
31	Las Vegas Bowl	L 28–38	December 16, 2017	2017	No. 25 Boise State Broncos	Sam Boyd Stadium	Whitney	36,432	Mario Cristobal
32	Redbox Bowl	W 7–6	December 31, 2018	2018	Michigan State Spartans	Levi's Stadium	Santa Clara	30,212	Mario Cristobal
33	Rose Bowl	W 28–27	January 1, 2020	2019	No. 8 Wisconsin Badgers	Rose Bowl	Pasadena	90,462	Mario Cristobal
34	Fiesta Bowl	L 17–34	January 2, 2021	2020	No. 10 Iowa State Cyclones	State Farm Stadium	Glendale	0	Mario Cristobal
35	Alamo Bowl	L 32–47	December 29, 2021	2021	No. 16 Oklahoma Sooners	Alamodome	San Antonio	59,121	Bryan McClendon
36	Holiday Bowl	W 28–27	December 28, 2022	2022	North Carolina Tar Heels	Petco Park	San Diego	36,242	Dan Lanning
37	Fiesta Bowl	W 45–6	January 1, 2024	2023	No. 18 Liberty Flames	State Farm Stadium	Glendale	47,769	Dan Lanning
38	Rose Bowl (CFP Quarterfinal)	L 21–41	January 1, 2025	2024	No. 6 Ohio State Buckeyes	Rose Bowl	Pasadena	90,732	Dan Lanning
39	CFP First Round	W 51–34	December 20, 2025	2025	No. 24 James Madison Dukes	Autzen Stadium	Eugene	55,124	Dan Lanning
40	Orange Bowl (CFP Quarterfinal)	W 23–0	January 1, 2026	2025	No. 4 Texas Tech Red Raiders	Hard Rock Stadium	Miami Gardens	65,021	Dan Lanning
41	Peach Bowl (CFP Semifinal)	L 22–56	January 9, 2026	2025	No. 1 Indiana Hoosiers	Mercedes-Benz Stadium	Atlanta	75,604	Dan Lanning
