= Chris Hampton =

American football coach (born 1986)

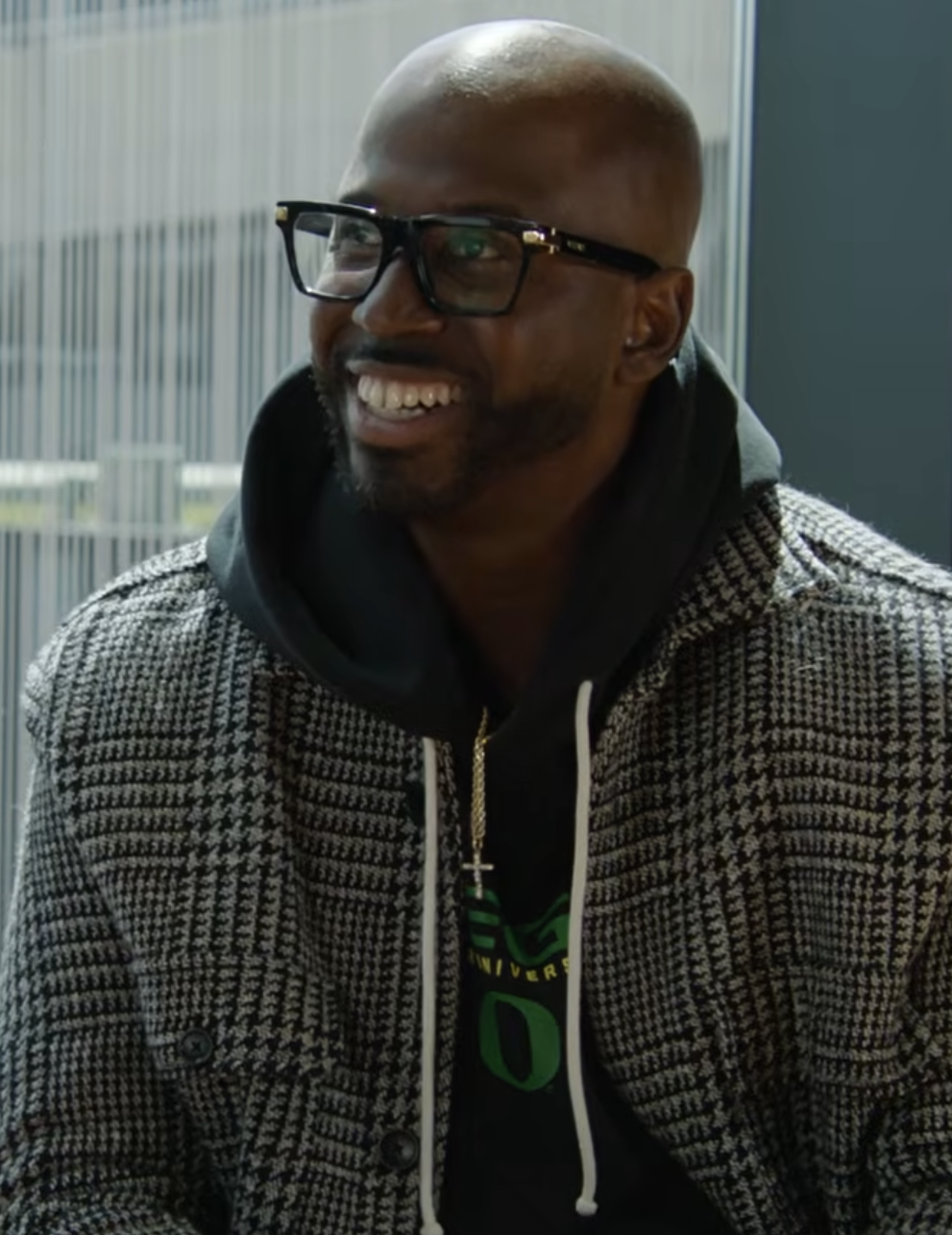
- Hampton in 2026

Current position
- Title: Defensive coordinator
- Team: Oregon
- Conference: Big Ten

Biographical details
- Born: February 6, 1986 (age 40); Memphis, Tennessee, U.S.

Playing career
- 2004–2007: South Carolina
- Position: Safety

Coaching career (HC unless noted)
- 2008: Arkansas State (GA)
- 2009–2010: Georgia Tech (GA)
- 2011: Central Arkansas (DB)
- 2012–2015: McNeese State (DB)
- 2016–2019: Tulane (DB)
- 2020: Duke (DB)
- 2021–2022: Tulane (DC)
- 2023–2025: Oregon (co-DC/S)
- 2026–present: Oregon (DC)

Chris Hampton (born February 6, 1986) is an American college football coach who is currently the defensive coordinator at the University of Oregon. Hampton played college football for the South Carolina Gamecocks as a safety from 2004 to 2007. He has held various assistant coaching positions at Arkansas State University, Georgia Tech, University of Central Arkansas, McNeese State University, Duke University, Tulane University, and the University of Oregon.

== Playing career ==
Hampton was a safety for South Carolina from 2004 to 2007 where he started for two seasons. He won the Harold White Award for the highest GPA on the team.

== Coaching career ==
=== Arkansas St ===
In 2008, Hampton began his coaching career as a graduate assistant at Arkansas State University.

=== Georgia Tech ===
In 2009, Hampton joined Georgia Tech as a graduate assistant.

=== Central Arkansas ===
In 2011, Hampton was hired as the defensive backs coach at the University of Central Arkansas.

=== McNeese State ===
In 2012, Hampton was hired by the McNeese State University to be their defensive backs coach.

=== Tulane ===
In 2016, Hampton was hired by the University of Louisiana at Monroe to be their defensive backs coach but he left for the same job at Tulane University before coaching a game.

=== Duke ===
In 2020, Hampton was hired by Duke to be their defensive backs coach.

=== Tulane (second stint) ===
In 2021, Hampton returned to Tulane as their defensive coordinator with head coach Willie Fritz stating that he was the only coach considered.

=== Oregon ===
In 2023, Hampton was hired as the co-defensive coordinator and safeties coach at the University of Oregon under head coach Dan Lanning.

On January 15, 2026, Hampton was promoted to defensive coordinator at Oregon following the departure of Tosh Lupoi..
