= Brandon Finney Jr. =

American football player (born 2005)

No. 4 – Oregon Ducks
- Position: Cornerback
- Class: Sophomore

Personal information
- Listed height: 6 ft 2 in (1.88 m)
- Listed weight: 203 lb (92 kg)

Career information
- High school: McDonogh School (Owings Mills, Maryland)
- College: Oregon (2025–present)

Awards and highlights
- Second-team All-Big Ten (2025); 2026 Orange Bowl Defensive MVP

Brandon Finney Jr. is an American college football cornerback for the Oregon Ducks.

== Early life ==
Finney is from Owings Mills, Maryland. He attended McDonogh School in Owings Mills where he played football as a wide receiver and cornerback. As a junior, he posted 51 catches for 632 yards and four touchdowns along with 22 tackles and three interceptions, followed by 13 tackles and three interceptions as a senior. He posted 51 tackles, six interceptions and 1,461 all-purpose yards at McDonogh, scoring 13 touchdowns while being invited to the All-American Bowl and the Polynesian Bowl. A five-star recruit, Finney was ranked by 247Sports as the best player in Maryland. He was also ranked among the top-30 recruits nationally by the publication. He committed to play college football for the Oregon Ducks.

== College career ==
Finney won a starting role at Oregon as a true freshman. In his sixth career game, he posted four tackles, two passes defended and an interception returned for a touchdown against Indiana, earning selection to Pro Football Focus's national team of the week.
