= Nasir Wyatt =

American football player

No. 31 – Oregon Ducks
- Position: Outside linebacker
- Class: Sophomore

Personal information
- Listed height: 6 ft 2 in (1.88 m)
- Listed weight: 245 lb (111 kg)

Career information
- High school: Mater Dei (Santa Ana, California)
- College: Oregon (2025–present)
- Stats at ESPN

Nasir Wyatt is an American college football outside linebacker for the Oregon Ducks.

== Early life ==
Wyatt attended Mater Dei High School in Santa Ana, California. As a senior he was the Orange County Register OC defensive player of the year after recording 26 tackles and 9.5 sacks. He had 13 sacks his sophomore year and 14 his junior year. Wyatt committed to the University of Oregon to play college football.

== College career ==
Wyatt earned immediate playing time at Oregon his freshman year in 2025, playing in all 15 games. He finished the season with 11 tackles and three sacks. He returned to Oregon for his sophomore season in 2026.
