= Mater Dei High School (Santa Ana, California) =

Catholic high school in Santa Ana, California, United States

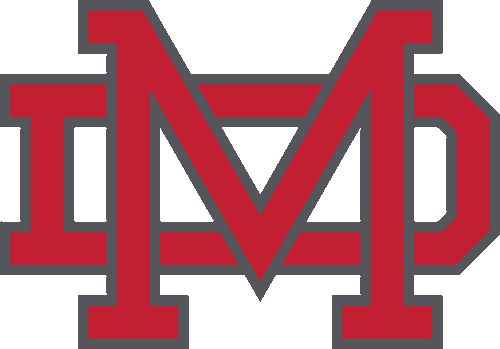

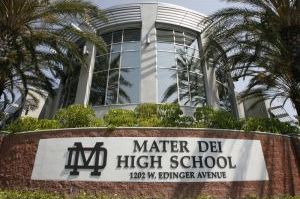
- Mater Dei High School, Santa Ana, California

Location
- 1202 West Edinger Avenue; Santa Ana, California 92707; United States; 33°43′36″N 117°52′59″W

Information
- Type: Private, College-prep
- Motto: Honor, Glory, Love
- Religious affiliation: Catholic
- Established: 1950
- Superintendent: Erin Barisano
- CEEB code: 053-240
- Principal: Frances Clare
- Teaching staff: 105.1 (on an FTE basis)
- Grades: 9–12
- Gender: Coeducational
- Enrollment: 2,152 (2015–2016)
- Student to teacher ratio: 20.5
- Colors: Red and grey
- Athletics conference: CIF Southern Section; Trinity League
- Nickname: Monarchs
- Rivals: Servite, St. John Bosco
- Accreditation: WASC, WCEA
- Newspaper: The Scarlet Scroll
- Yearbook: Crown
- Tuition: Catholic: $19,150; Non Catholic: $20,600
- Website: materdei.org

Mater Dei High School is a private, Catholic, co-educational secondary school in Santa Ana, California, located in and administered by the Diocese of Orange.

Mater Dei is nationally known for its strong sports programs, especially in football. It is ranked first in the United States for "best high schools for athletes" by school review company Niche. In 2014, Bleacher Report ranked it in the top five high schools in the U.S. for producing professional athletes. Over 68 percent of the student body participates in some role with a team, in one of the 25 different sports sponsored by the school. Altogether they have won 90 CIF, state, and national championships.

== History ==
The Archdiocese of Los Angeles opened Mater Dei in 1950, the first Catholic high school in Orange County. The school had 111 students and a faculty of seven, including Sisters of Charity of the Blessed Virgin Mary, plus principal Fr. Joseph Eyraud. In 1953 they were joined by the Patrician Brothers, who taught until 2005.

Enrollment grew rapidly. The school was originally designed for 800 students, but by 1964 was serving 1,800. In the 1970s it became the largest Catholic high school west of Chicago. Overcrowding persisted until 1987, when Santa Margarita Catholic High School opened in South Orange County.

In 2000, Mater Dei embarked on a major capital campaign to fund a new parking lot, chapel, library, and service buildings, as well as a spate of athletic facilities and, in 2019, a much-needed parking garage.

== Controversy ==
The school has received mixed attention in local media, due in part to scouting athletes from public high schools and offering scholarships, in order to reinforce their acclaimed football program.

In 2021, a lawsuit was filed alleging that systemic hazing pervaded the football program resulting in a "brutal locker room altercation." This lawsuit was dismissed with prejudice in 2023. Another 2021 lawsuit alleged that two Mater Dei football players severely injured a classmate in an orchestrated attack. Orange County bishop Kevin Vann responded with a public statement supporting the school's leadership and criticizing the "media frenzy". The school announced it would commission an independent investigation into the allegations.

In January 2022, a female alumna of Mater Dei filed a lawsuit following the surfacing accusations of hazing, alleging that she was sexually assaulted by a former football coach during the late 1980s.

== Athletics ==
Mater Dei High School's teams are named the Monarchs, and their colors are red and grey. As of 2023, the school sponsors boys' and girls' teams at multiple levels in 25 sports in the Trinity League, part of CIF Southern Section:

- Baseball
- Basketball
- Beach Volleyball
- Cheerleading
- Cross-Country
- Football
- Golf
- Lacrosse
- Soccer
- Sailing
- Softball
- Swimming & Diving
- Tennis
- Track & Field
- Volleyball
- Water Polo
- Wrestling

In addition, boys' beach volleyball, e-sports, equestrian, ice hockey, and surfing are offered on a club level.

Known for their football and basketball programs, Mater Dei has also graduated professional athletes Robbie Rogers (soccer), Tiki Ghosn (mixed martial arts), and Greg Woepse (pole vault), as well as ten Olympians. A total of 15 players have been named Gatorade California State Players of the Year.

=== State champions ===
Year	Sport	Division	
2013	California high school basketball championship - Boys State Champions	Open Division	Mater Dei (Santa Ana) def. Archbishop Mitty 50-45
2014	Boys basketball State Champions	Open Division	Mater Dei (Santa Ana) def. Bishop O'Dowd (Oakland) 71-61

=== Football ===
The Mater Dei football team plays in CIF Southern Section Division 1. They most recently won the CIF State Championship during the 2024 season, and won national championships in 1994, 1996, 2017, 2018, 2020, 2021, and 2023. As of 2022, three graduates have won the Heisman Trophy, John Huarte, Matt Leinart, and Bryce Young.

In 2021 The New York Times cited Mater Dei's football program and that of rival St. John Bosco for making high school football look like NCAA Division I competition in terms of recruiting, training, and facilities.

== Notable alumni ==
=== Athletics ===
- Bob Ammann – former soccer goalkeeper
- Mike Ammann – former professional soccer player
- Devin Askew - college basketball guard
- Cooper Barkate (born 2003) – college football wide receiver for the Miami Hurricanes
- Matt Barkley – NFL quarterback
- McQuin Baron – Olympic water polo player
- Colt Brennan – NFL quarterback
- Elijah Brown – former quarterback for the Stanford Cardinal and currently plays for the Washington Huskies
- Raleek Brown (born 2003) – college football running back for the Texas Longhorns
- Zabien Brown (born 2006) – college football cornerback for the Alabama Crimson Tide
- Bol Bol – NBA center
- Cedric Bozeman - NBA player
- Schea Cotton – basketball player
- JT Daniels (born 2000) – college football quarterback for the Rice Owls
- Kayden Dixon-Wyatt (born 2007) – college football wide receiver for the USC Trojans
- Daryus Dixson (born 2006) – college football cornerback for the Penn State
- Thomas Duarte – NFL tight end
- LeRon Ellis – NBA power forward and center
- Danny Espinosa – MLB second baseman
- Austin Faoliu – NFL defensive tackle
- Nate Frazier (born 2005) – college football running back for the Georgia Bulldogs
- Spencer Freedman (born 1998) – college basketball player for the Harvard Crimson and NYU Violets
- Mike Gerrity - professional basketball coach in the National Basketball Association (NBA).
- Reggie Geary (born 1973) – NBA guard
- Tiki Ghosn – Mixed martial arts fighter
- Matt Grootegoed – NFL linebacker
- Chris Henry Jr. (born 2007) – college football wide receiver for the Ohio State Buckeyes
- Mike Hessman – Major League Baseball player and inductee of the International League Hall of Fame
- Vince Hizon – American-born former Philippine Basketball Association player
- Khaled Holmes – NFL center
- Haley Hopkins - NWSL player
- Mike Hopkins – NCAA basketball player and coach
- John Huarte (born 1944) – Heisman Trophy winner and NFL quarterback
- Kyron Hudson (born 2002) – NFL wide receiver
- Sara Hughes – professional beach volleyball player
- Chris Jackson – NFL wide receiver
- Domani Jackson – college football cornerback for the Alabama Crimson Tide
- Stanley Johnson – NBA forward
- Annie Karich - soccer player
- Taylor King – professional basketball player
- Kelsey Kollen – former softball player for the Michigan Wolverines
- Tyler Lamb – professional basketball player
- Quentin Lake – professional football player for the Los Angeles Rams
- Matt Leinart (born 1983) – Heisman Trophy winner and NFL quarterback
- Todd Marinovich – NFL quarterback
- Bru McCoy – college football player for the Tennessee Volunteers
- Chase McGrath – professional football placekicker
- Ryan McMahon – MLB player
- Bobby Meacham – MLB shortstop and coach
- Daniel Meyer – Major League Baseball player
- Kaleena Mosqueda-Lewis – WNBA guard
- Leaonna Odom – WNBA small forward
- Ricky Ortiz – NFL fullback
- Kennedy Polamalu – former professional football player and current running backs coach for the Seattle Seahawks
- Katin Reinhardt – professional basketball player
- Nikko Remigio – NFL wide receiver
- Curtis Robinson – professional football player for the San Francisco 49ers
- Robbie Rogers – MLS winger
- Jamal Sampson – NBA forward-center
- Katie Lou Samuelson – guard/forward in the WNBA
- Sergio Santos – MLB relief pitcher
- Miles Simon – basketball analyst for ESPN and former NBA guard
- Anthony Slama – MLB relief pitcher
- Olive Sagapolu – USFL defensive tackle
- Amon-Ra St. Brown – NFL wide receiver
- Ryan Stonehouse – American football punter, NCAA record holder
- D. J. Strawberry – NBA point guard
- Matt Treanor – MLB catcher
- Alonzo Tredwell – professional baseball pitcher
- Michael Wang – NCAA basketball player
- David Wear – NCAA basketball forward
- Travis Wear – NBA basketball forward
- CJ Williams – NFL football player
- Larry Williams – NFL football player
- Max Wittek – former NCAA football quarterback
- Greg Woepse – silver medalist at the 1979 Pan Am Games in the pole vault
- Nasir Wyatt – college football outside linebacker for the Oregon Ducks
- Bryce Young (born 2001) – Heisman Trophy winner and American football quarterback for the Carolina Panthers

=== Other ===
- John A. Davis – film director/animator
- Mike Gallagher (2002) – United States Congressman from Wisconsin's 8th congressional district (2017–present)
- Bob Gunton – actor
- Jeff Lewis – real estate agent and investor
- Annie Mumolo – screenwriter, actress, comedian, and producer
- Steve Oedekerk – film actor, comedian, director, film editor, film producer, and screenwriter
- Aimee Phan – author
- Mike Pniewski – actor, speaker
- Shelby Rabara – actress, voice over actress, and dancer
- Jaime Soto – Bishop of the Diocese of Sacramento
- Victory Tischler-Blue – singer, film producer, director, photographer, and member of the all-female band The Runaways
- Jennifer Warnes – singer, songwriter, arranger, and record producer
- Juan Zarate (1989) – Assistant Secretary of the Treasury (2001–2005) and Deputy National Security Advisor for Combating Terrorism (2005–2009)
