= Jordon Davison =

American football player

No. 0 – Oregon Ducks
- Position: Running back
- Class: Sophomore

Personal information
- Born: Berkeley, California, U.S.
- Listed height: 6 ft 0 in (1.83 m)
- Listed weight: 221 lb (100 kg)

Career information
- High school: Mater Dei (Santa Ana, California)
- College: Oregon (2025–present)
- Stats at ESPN

Jordon Davison is an American college football running back for the Oregon Ducks.

== Early life ==
Davison is from Berkeley, California. He attended Mater Dei High School in Santa Ana where he played football as a running back. As a freshman, he made the varsity team and helped Mater Dei win the national championship, running for 188 yards while averaging 6.3 yards per carry and scoring three touchdowns. He was named second-team freshman All-American for his performance by MaxPreps. He ran for 1,514 yards and 17 touchdowns during his sophomore season, then had 662 rushing yards and 10 touchdowns as a junior.

Davison was named the Trinity League Offensive Most Valuable Player and the MaxPreps California High School Player of the Year as a senior in 2024, when he ran for 1,214 yards and 14 touchdowns. He concluded his stint at Mater Dei having gained 3,499 yards while scoring 46 touchdowns, receiving an invitation to the All-American Bowl. He was ranked a four-star recruit and one of the top-100 players nationally by Rivals.com and ESPN. He committed to play college football for the Oregon Ducks.

== College career ==
Davison saw significant playing time for Oregon as a true freshman in 2025, scoring three touchdowns in his college debut. Through the first seven games, he scored eight rushing touchdowns to lead the team.
