= Jamari Johnson =

American football player

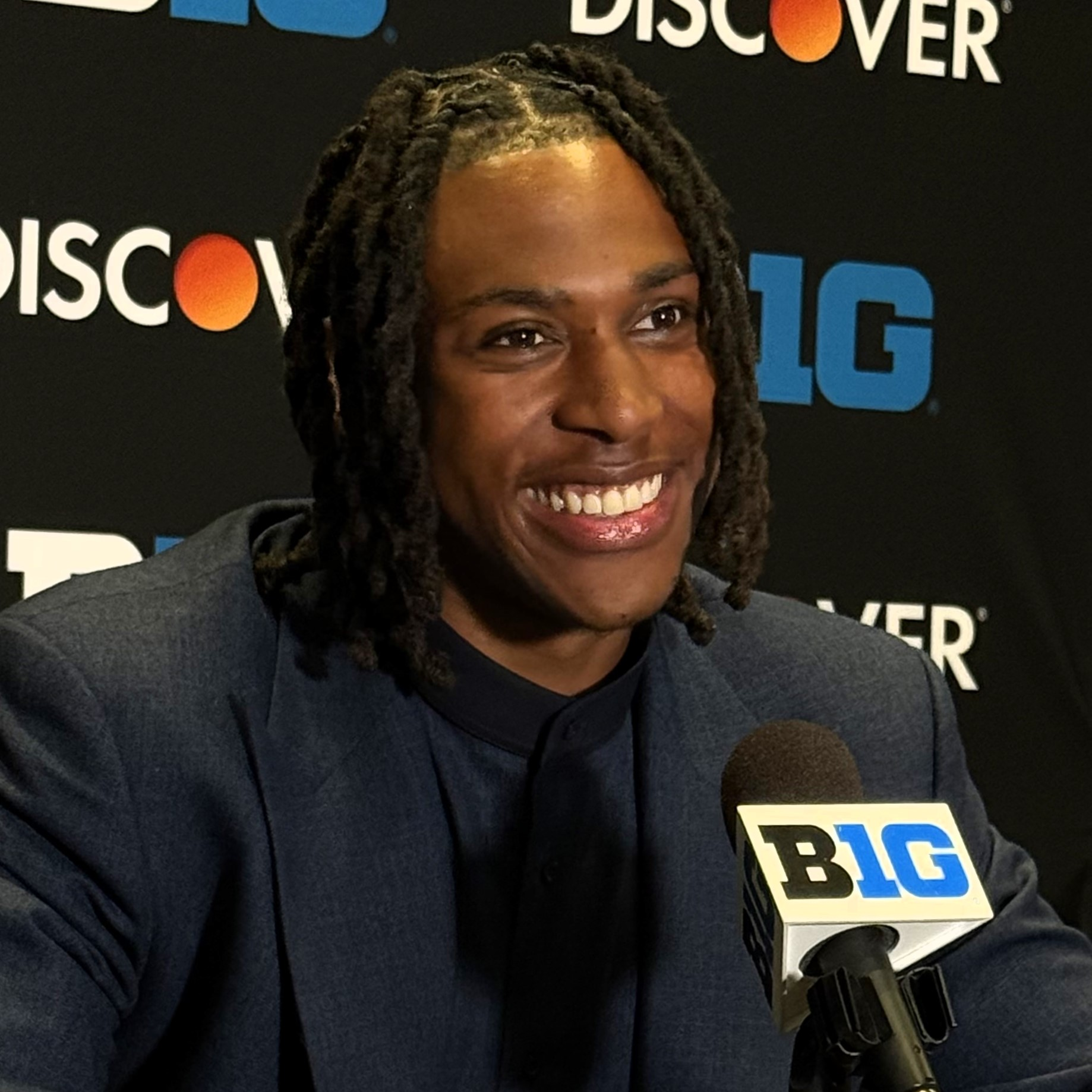
- Johnson in 2026

No. 9 – Oregon Ducks
- Position: Tight end
- Class: Redshirt Junior

Personal information
- Listed height: 6 ft 5 in (1.96 m)
- Listed weight: 257 lb (117 kg)

Career information
- High school: Inglewood (Inglewood, California)
- College: Louisville (2023–2024); Oregon (2025–present)
- Stats at ESPN

Jamari Johnson is an American college football tight end for the Oregon Ducks. He previously played for the Louisville Cardinals.

== Early life ==
Johnson attended Inglewood High School in Inglewood, California. He originally played quarterback before switching to tight end and also played wide receiver, running back and defensive end. As a senior, he was named the Ocean League MVP. Johnson was selected to play in the 2023 All-American Bowl. He committed to the University of Louisville to play college football.

== College career ==
Johnson played in five games and redshirted his first year at Louisville in 2023. He played in seven games as a redshirt freshman in 2024, recording 13 receptions for 158 yards and a touchdown, before suffering a season ending ankle injury. After the season, he entered the transfer portal and transferred to the University of Oregon. Johnson spent his first season at Oregon in 2025 as the backup to Kenyon Sadiq.
