= Dan Lanning =

American football player and coach (born 1986)

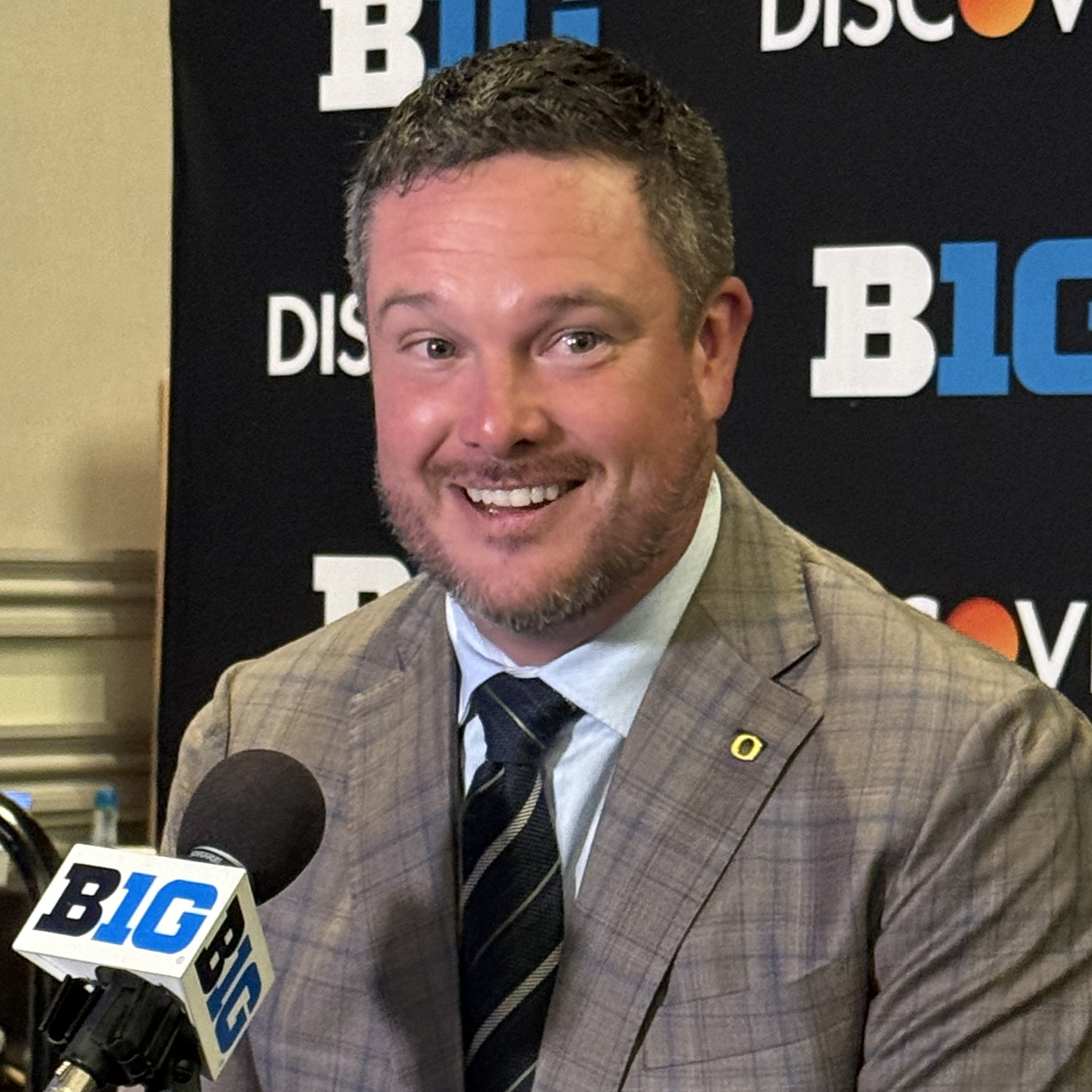
- Lanning at 2026 Big Ten Media Days

Current position
- Title: Head coach
- Team: Oregon
- Conference: Big Ten
- Record: 56–11
- Annual salary: $10.6 million

Biographical details
- Born: April 10, 1986 (age 40); Kansas City, Missouri, U.S.

Playing career
- 2004–2007: William Jewell
- Position: Linebacker

Coaching career (HC unless noted)
- 2008–2010: Park Hill South HS (MO) (ST/DB/WR)
- 2011: Pittsburgh (GA)
- 2012: Arizona State (GA)
- 2013: Arizona State (RC)
- 2014: Sam Houston State (DB/co-RC)
- 2015: Alabama (GA)
- 2016–2017: Memphis (ILB/RC)
- 2018: Georgia (OLB)
- 2019–2021: Georgia (DC/OLB)
- 2022–present: Oregon

Head coaching record
- Overall: 56–11
- Bowls: 3–2
- Tournaments: 2–2 (CFP)

Accomplishments and honors

Championships
- 1 Big Ten (2024)

Awards
- Stallings Award (2025)

Daniel Arthur Lanning (born April 10, 1986) is an American college football coach who serves as the head football coach at the University of Oregon. He was previously the defensive coordinator and outside linebackers coach at the University of Georgia from 2019 to 2021.

Lanning played college football at William Jewell College as a linebacker from 2004 to 2007. He has held various coaching positions at Park Hill South High School in Kansas City, Missouri, the University of Pittsburgh, Arizona State University, Sam Houston State University, the University of Alabama, the University of Memphis, the University of Georgia and the University of Oregon.

== Playing career ==
Lanning played linebacker at William Jewell College in Missouri from 2004 to 2007. While attending William Jewell, he lived in a house on Elizabeth Street and was roommates with Trent Figg, formerly an offensive analyst under Lanning at Oregon. Another teammate, albeit not living in the house, was Robby Discher.

== Coaching career ==
=== Early career ===
After his playing career at William Jewell ended, Lanning spent three seasons working at Park Hill South High School as the special teams coordinator, defensive backs coach, and wide receivers coach. Aspiring to be an NCAA Division I football coach, Lanning drove thirteen hours to Pittsburgh to convince the coaching staff led by Todd Graham, who he had met at coaching clinics attended by the Park Hill South staff at Tulsa, to hire him. He was subsequently hired as a graduate assistant at Pittsburgh for one season before following Graham to Arizona State as a graduate assistant. He was promoted in 2013 to the on-campus recruiting coordinator. He was hired away to be the defensive backs coach and co-recruiting coordinator at Sam Houston State in March 2014. He spent 2015 as a graduate assistant at Alabama, where the Crimson Tide defeated Clemson 45–40 in the CFP National Championship game.

Lanning was hired to be the inside linebackers coach and recruiting coordinator at Memphis in December 2015, reuniting with Mike Norvell who was the offensive coordinator at Arizona State when Lanning was a graduate assistant and on-campus recruiting coordinator.

=== Georgia ===
Lanning was hired in 2018 by Georgia as the outside linebackers coach.

After Bulldogs defensive coordinator Mel Tucker left to accept the head coaching position at Colorado after the 2018 season, Lanning was promoted to defensive coordinator in addition to his duties as the outside linebackers coach.

Following Georgia's victory in the Sugar Bowl, Lanning received a raise to $1.25 million. In 2021, Lanning was considered for the Kansas head coach vacancy. However, the position ended up going to Lance Leipold.

In Lanning’s final year, Georgia would finish undefeated in the regular season, going on to win the 2022 College Football Playoff National Championship, defeating the Michigan Wolverines in the Orange Bowl semifinal and the Alabama Crimson Tide in the National Championship Game.

=== Oregon ===
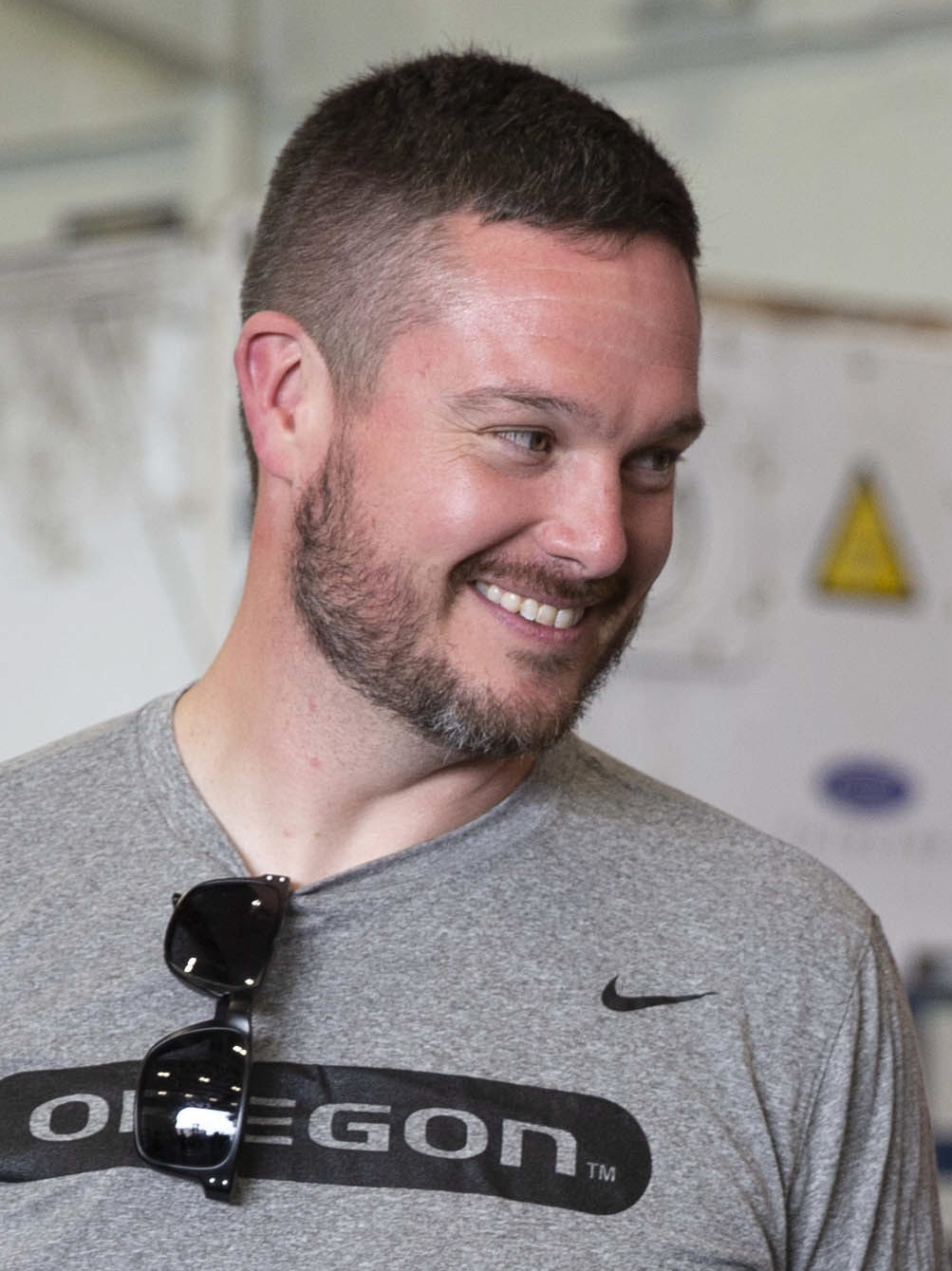
Lanning before the 2022 Holiday Bowl.

On December 11, 2021, Lanning was named the 35th head coach at the University of Oregon, replacing Mario Cristobal after his departure to become the head coach at the University of Miami. Lanning signed a six-year, $29.1 million contract with the Ducks. In his first season with the Ducks, Lanning led the team to a 9–3 regular season record highlighted with ranked victories over BYU, UCLA, and Utah. The Ducks earned a spot in the Holiday Bowl, where they defeated North Carolina 28–27.

In the 2023 season, Lanning led the team to an 11–1 regular season record, with the lone loss coming to #7 Washington on October 14. The Ducks had a rematch with Washington in the Pac-12 Championship, falling 34–31. Oregon finished the season with a 45–6 victory over Liberty in the Fiesta Bowl.

Lanning led the Ducks to a perfect 12–0 regular season in 2024, highlighted with a 32–31 win over #2 Ohio State. The Ducks defeated Penn State in the Big Ten Championship Game and qualified for the College Football Playoff earning the top overall seed and a first-round bye. The Ducks’ stay in the Playoff was short-lived, however, as Ohio State defeated them in the quarterfinals at the Rose Bowl 41–21.

Oregon started the 2025 season as the #7 team in the AP Poll. Lanning helped lead the team to a 5–0 start, which saw a 30–24 double overtime win over #3 Penn State. Oregon moved up to #3 but fell to #7 Indiana in the next game, 30–20. Oregon finished the regular season on a six-game winning streak to finish 11–1 and qualify for the College Football Playoff as the #5-seed. In the First Round, Oregon defeated #12-seed James Madison 51–34. In the quarterfinals, Oregon defeated #4-seed Texas Tech 23–0 at the Orange Bowl. In the Semifinals at the Peach Bowl, Oregon's season ended in a rematch with #1-seed Indiana 56–22.

In October 2026, Lanning made a change to Oregon's coaching staff by dismissing offensive coordinator Drew Mehringer after the team's struggles on offense.

== Personal life ==
Lanning and his wife, Sauphia, have three children.

== Head coaching record ==
Year	Team	Overall	Conference	Standing	Bowl/playoffs	Coaches^{#}	AP^{°}
Oregon Ducks (Pac-12 Conference) (2022–2023)
2022	Oregon	10–3	7–2	T–2nd	W Holiday	16	15
2023	Oregon	12–2	8–1	2nd	W Fiesta^{†}	7	6
Oregon:		22–5	15–3				
Oregon Ducks (Big Ten Conference) (2024–present)
2024	Oregon	13–1	9–0	1st	L CFP Quarterfinals Rose^{†}	4	3
2025	Oregon	13–2	8–1	3rd	W CFP First Round^{†}, W Orange^{†}, L Peach^{†}	4	4
2026	Oregon	8–3	6–2				
Oregon:		34–7	23–3				
Total:		56–11					
National championship Conference title Conference division title or championship game berth
^{†}Indicates CFP / New Years' Six bowl.; ^{#}Rankings from final Coaches Poll.; ^{°}Rankings from final AP Poll.
