= Jeremiah McClellan =

American football player

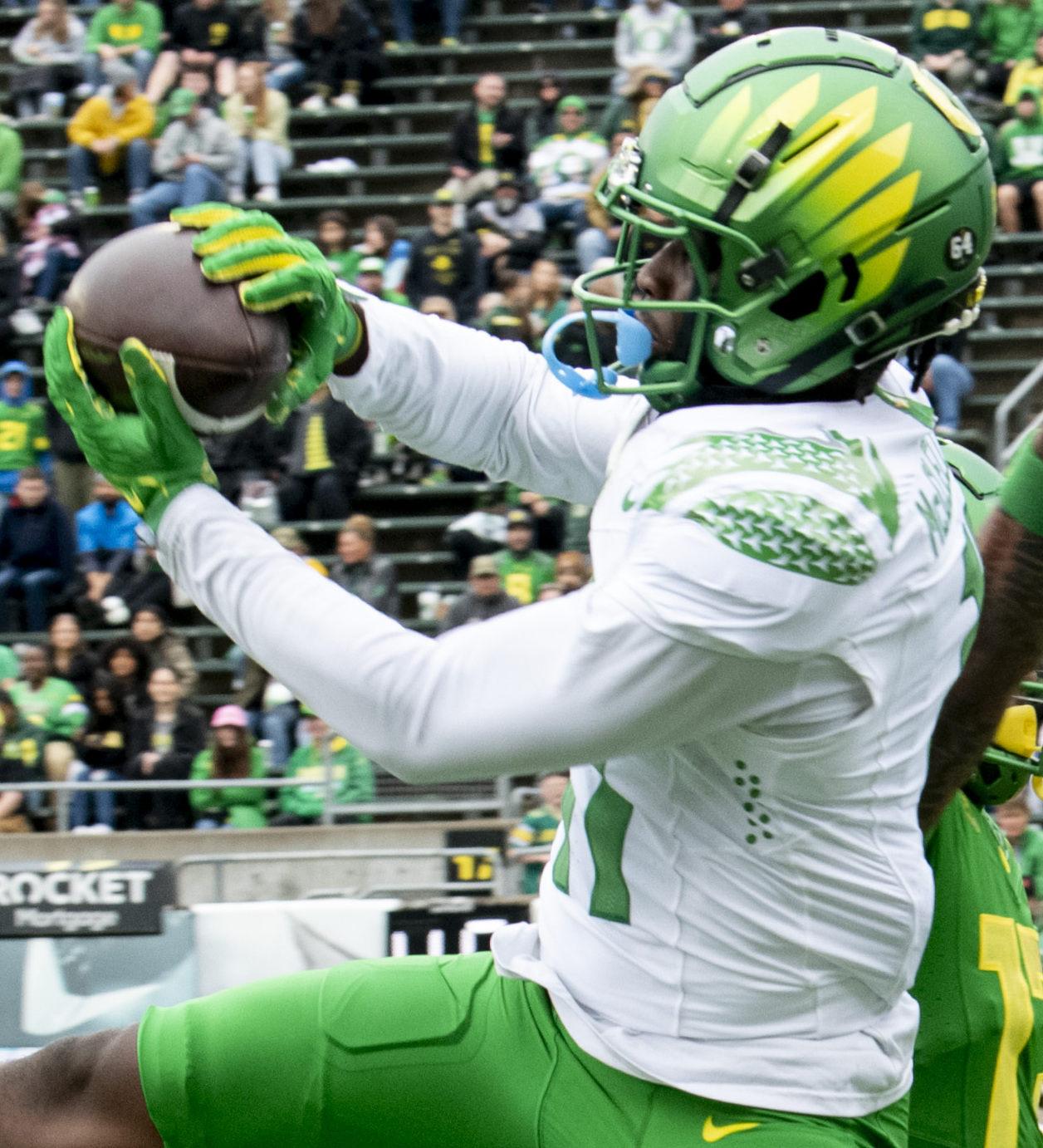
- McClellan in 2024

No. 3 – Oregon Ducks
- Position: Wide receiver
- Class: Redshirt Sophomore

Personal information
- Listed height: 6 ft 0 in (1.83 m)
- Listed weight: 195 lb (88 kg)

Career information
- High school: Christian Brothers (St. Louis, Missouri)
- College: Oregon (2024–present)
- Stats at ESPN

Jeremiah McClellan is an American college football wide receiver for the Oregon Ducks.

== Early life ==
McClellan attended Christian Brothers College High School in St. Louis, Missouri. As a senior in 2023, he was the St. Louis Post-Dispatch All-Metro football offensive player of the year. A top-100 recruit, McClellan was selected to play in the 2024 Under Armour All-American Game. He originally committed to play college football at Ohio State University before flipping his commitment to the University of Oregon.

== College career ==
As a true freshman at Oregon in 2024, McClellan redshirted after appearing in four games and recording three receptions for 24 yards. He earned more playing time his redshirt freshman year in 2025.
