= Dierre Hill =

American college football player

No. 6 – Oregon Ducks
- Position: Running back
- Class: Sophomore

Personal information
- Listed height: 5 ft 11 in (1.80 m)
- Listed weight: 205 lb (93 kg)

Career information
- High school: Vashon (St. Louis, Missouri); Althoff Catholic (Belleville, Illinois)
- College: Oregon (2025–present)
- Stats at ESPN

Dierre Hill Jr. is an American college football running back for the Oregon Ducks.

== Early life ==
Hill is from Centralia, Illinois. He started playing football in third grade, scoring six touchdowns in his first game. He attended Vashon High School for two years before transferring to Althoff Catholic High School; in high school, he competed in football as a running back, track and field as a sprinter, and basketball as a guard.

As a junior in football, Hill ran for 1,788 yards and 28 touchdowns. Hill then ran for 2,588 yards and scored 51 touchdowns as a senior in 2024. He helped Althoff to their first state title since 1990 as a senior, running for 436 yards and seven touchdowns in the championship game. He was named the Gatorade Illinois Player of the Year in his final two seasons. Ranked a four-star recruit and the fourth-best running back nationally, he committed to play college football for the Oregon Ducks.

== College career ==
In his third game at Oregon, Hill led the team with five runs for 94 yards, including a 66-yard touchdown.
