= Noah Whittington =

American football player (born 2001)

No. 26 – Houston Texans
- Position: Running back
- Roster status: Practice squad/injured

Personal information
- Born: December 13, 2001 (age 24)
- Listed height: 5 ft 8 in (1.73 m)
- Listed weight: 203 lb (92 kg)

Career information
- High school: Peach County (Fort Valley, Georgia)
- College: Western Kentucky (2020–2021); Oregon (2022–2025)
- NFL draft: 2026: undrafted

Career history
- Houston Texans (2026–present)*
- * Offseason or practice squad member only
- Stats at Pro Football Reference

Noah Whittington (born December 13, 2001) is an American professional football running back for the Houston Texans of the National Football League (NFL). He played college football for the Western Kentucky Hilltoppers and Oregon Ducks.

== Early life ==
Whittington attended high school at Peach County located in Fort Valley, Georgia. Coming out of high school, he committed to play college football for the Western Kentucky Hilltoppers.

== College career ==
=== Western Kentucky ===
During his freshman season in 2020, Whittington played in 12 games, rushing for 39 yards on 16 carries. In the 2021 season, he rushed 101 times for 617 yards and two touchdowns, where after the conclusion of the season, he decided to enter his name into the NCAA transfer portal.

=== Oregon ===
Whittington transferred to play for the Oregon Ducks. In his first season with the Ducks in 2022, Whittington rushed for a career-high 779 yards and five touchdowns on 139 carries, while also notching 22 receptions for 169 yards and a touchdown. During the 2023 season, he was limited to just four games due to a torn ACL, where he rushed for 146 yards and two touchdowns. Whittington finished the 2024 season, rushing for 540 yards and six touchdowns, while also hauling in 24 passes for 136 yards and two touchdowns. Heading into the 2025 season, he earned the Ducks starting running back job over Tulane transfer Makhi Hughes. In their week one matchup, Whittington rushed ten times for 68 yards and a touchdown in a victory over Montana State.

== Professional career ==
Pre-draft measurables
Height	Weight	Arm length	Hand span	Wingspan	Bench press
5 ft 8 1/4 in (1.73 m)	205 lb (93 kg)	29 1/8 in (0.74 m)	8 1/4 in (0.21 m)	5 ft 10 7/8 in (1.80 m)	24 reps
All values from NFL Combine

On May 8, 2026, Whittington signed with the Houston Texans as an undrafted free agent. Whittington was waived by the Texans on August 30 as a part of final roster cuts; he was re-signed to the team's practice squad the following day.
