= Kenyon Sadiq =

American football player (born 2005)

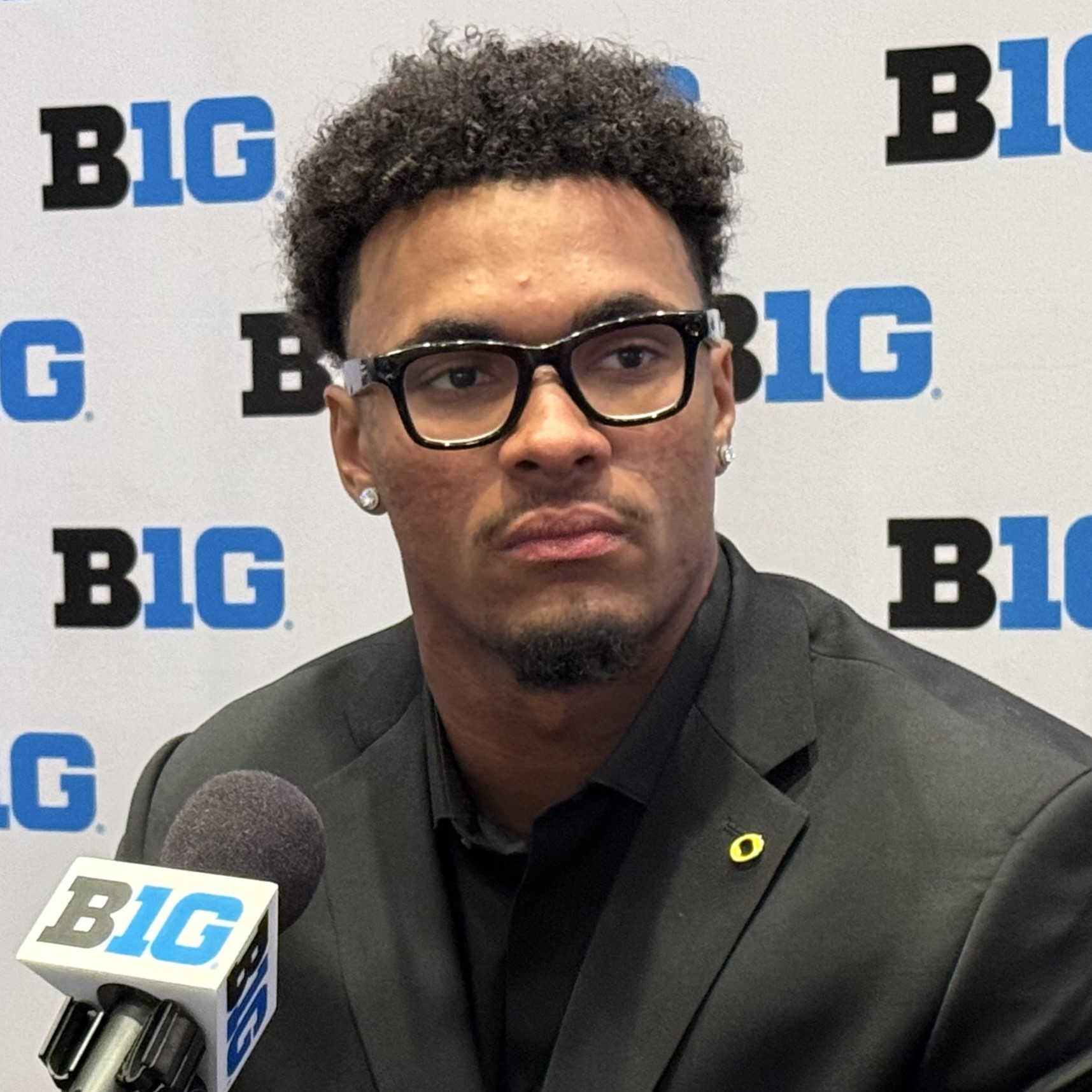
- Sadiq in 2025

No. 16 – New York Jets
- Position: Tight end
- Roster status: Active

Personal information
- Born: March 4, 2005 (age 21); Idaho Falls, Idaho, U.S.
- Listed height: 6 ft 3 in (1.91 m)
- Listed weight: 250 lb (113 kg)

Career information
- High school: Skyline (Idaho Falls)
- College: Oregon (2023–2025)
- NFL draft: 2026: 1st round, 16th overall pick

Career history
- New York Jets (2026–present)

Awards and highlights
- Second-team All-American (2025); Big Ten Tight End of the Year (2025)

Career NFL statistics as of Week 10, 2026
- Receptions: 22
- Receiving yards: 238
- Receiving touchdowns: 1
- Stats at Pro Football Reference

Kenyon Sadiq (/ˈsɑːdik/ SAH-deek; born March 4, 2005) is an American professional football tight end for the New York Jets of the National Football League (NFL). He played college football for the Oregon Ducks and was selected by the Jets in the first round of the 2026 NFL draft.

== Early life ==
Sadiq was born on March 4, 2005 in Idaho Falls, Idaho. Raised by a single mother along with two other siblings, Sadiq and his family resided in McCammon, Idaho for most of his early life, often spending time living with his grandparents. His grandfather, Terry Pleadger, was a Bannock County Sheriff and father figure for Sadiq, and his grandmother, Alaine Pleadger, was another significant figure in his upbringing. Sadiq began playing football when he was in the fourth grade, where he was a Running back in a primarily Wing-T offense. Sadiq also played Tackle football, and won a national championship for it in Las Vegas when he was in seventh grade. For his freshman year of high school, Sadiq attended Marsh Valley High School in Arimo, Idaho, before returning to Idaho Falls to help tend to his grandmother who was suffering from Breast cancer. After moving, Sadiq attended Skyline High School, where he, as a sophomore, helped contribute to a 42–22 IHSAA 4A state championship win over Emmett High School. As a junior he notched 79 receptions, 1,166 receiving yards and 19 touchdowns. Coming out of high school, Sadiq was rated as a four-star recruit and the number one recruit in Idaho, and committed to play college football for the Oregon Ducks over offers from schools such as Iowa State, Michigan, and Washington.

== College career ==
In the 2024 Fiesta Bowl, Sadiq hauled in his first career touchdown in the win. He finished his freshman season in 2023 with five receptions for 24 yards and a touchdown, as well a carry for 12 yards, while appearing in all 14 games. In 2024, Sadiq saw his role with the Ducks increase. In Week 8 of the 2024 season, he hauled in two receptions for a career-high 58 yards. In the 2024 Big Ten Football Championship Game, Sadiq hauled in two receptions for 30 yards and two touchdowns in a win over Penn State. He finished the 2024 season with 24 receptions for 308 yards and two touchdowns.

Sadiq made 14 appearances for the Ducks in 2025, recording 51 receptions for 560 yards and eight touchdowns. He declared for the 2026 NFL draft following the season.

=== Statistics ===
Year	Team	GP	Receiving			
Year	Team	GP	Rec	Yds	Avg	TD
2023	Oregon	14	5	24	4.8	1
2024	Oregon	14	24	308	12.8	2
2025	Oregon	14	51	560	11.0	8
Career		42	80	892	11.2	11

== Professional career ==
Pre-draft measurables
Height	Weight	Arm length	Hand span	Wingspan	40-yard dash	10-yard split	20-yard split	Vertical jump	Broad jump	Bench press
6 ft 3 1/8 in (1.91 m)	241 lb (109 kg)	31 1/2 in (0.80 m)	10 in (0.25 m)	6 ft 6 1/4 in (1.99 m)	4.39 s	1.54 s	2.57 s	43.5 in (1.10 m)	11 ft 1 in (3.38 m)	26 reps
All values from NFL Combine

Sadiq was selected in the first round of the 2026 NFL draft with the 16th overall pick by the New York Jets. Prior to the draft, the Jets previously obtained the selection as part of the trade that sent Sauce Gardner to the Indianapolis Colts. On May 7, he signed a four-year, $22.3 million contract with the Jets. On May 28, it was announced that Sadiq had undergone a 'minor' procedure to address a hernia.

In the Jets' Week 1 game against the Tennessee Titans, Sadiq scored his first career NFL touchdown on a three-yard rush. Against the Detroit Lions in Week 3, Sadiq recorded his first receiving touchdown in the NFL as he caught a 24-yard pass from quarterback Geno Smith.

== Personal life ==
Sadiq enjoys outdoor activities such as fishing and hiking in his free time, hobbies he adopted from his grandfather.
