= 2025 Indiana Hoosiers football team =

American college football season

2025 Indiana Hoosiers football

Consensus national champion Big Ten champion Rose Bowl champion Peach Bowl champion

Big Ten Championship Game, W 13–10 vs. Ohio State

Rose Bowl (CFP Quarterfinal), W 38–3 vs. Alabama Peach Bowl (CFP Semifinal), W 56–22 vs. Oregon CFP National Championship, W 27–21 vs. Miami (FL)
- Conference: Big Ten Conference

Ranking
- Coaches: No. 1
- AP: No. 1
- Record: 16–0 (9–0 Big Ten)
- Head coach: Curt Cignetti (2nd season)
- Offensive coordinator: Mike Shanahan (2nd season)
- Co-offensive coordinator: Chandler Whitmer (1st season)
- Offensive scheme: Pro spread
- Defensive coordinator: Bryant Haines (2nd season)
- Base defense: Multiple 4–2–5
- Home stadium: Memorial Stadium

2025 Big Ten Conference football standings
	Conf.			Overall
Team	W		L	W		L
No. 1 Indiana y$#^	9	–	0	16	–	0
No. 5 Ohio State y^	9	–	0	12	–	2
No. 4 Oregon ^	8	–	1	13	–	2
No. 21 Michigan	7	–	2	9	–	4
No. 20 USC	7	–	2	9	–	4
No. 17 Iowa	6	–	3	9	–	4
Illinois	5	–	4	9	–	4
Washington	5	–	4	9	–	4
Minnesota	5	–	4	8	–	5
Nebraska	4	–	5	7	–	6
Northwestern	4	–	5	7	–	6
Penn State	3	–	6	7	–	6
UCLA	3	–	6	3	–	9
Rutgers	2	–	7	5	–	7
Wisconsin	2	–	7	4	–	8
Maryland	1	–	8	4	–	8
Michigan State	1	–	8	4	–	8
Purdue	0	–	9	2	–	10
Championship: Indiana 13, Ohio State 10
# – College Football Playoff champion; ^ – College Football Playoff participant; $ – Conference champion; y – Championship game participant; As of November 20, 2026; Rankings from AP Poll

The 2025 Indiana Hoosiers football team represented Indiana University Bloomington (Indiana or IU) during the 2025 NCAA Division I FBS football season. The Hoosiers were led by second-year head coach Curt Cignetti. They played home games at Memorial Stadium located in Bloomington, Indiana, as members of the Big Ten Conference.

The 2025 season was the most successful season in Indiana's football history. The season included numerous firsts for the program: the Hoosiers defeated a top-five ranked opponent on the road for the first time (week 7 at No. 3 Oregon); had their highest AP poll, Coaches Poll, and College Football Playoff rankings in program history (all at No. 1); had a road victory at Penn State in week 11, marking their first-ever win in Beaver Stadium; finished the regular season with a perfect 12–0 record for the first time (exceeding their program record of 11 wins from the previous year); and made their first Big Ten Championship Game in program history. In that game, they defeated then-No. 1 Ohio State for the first time since 1988, won the Big Ten title for the first time since 1967, and won the conference outright for the first time since 1945. Quarterback Fernando Mendoza also became the first Hoosier to win the Heisman Trophy. This Indiana team was the first one since 1945 to finish the regular season undefeated and the only one to ever do so without tying a game after ties were abolished following the 1995 regular season with the introduction of overtime. Their appearance in the Big Ten Championship against Ohio State reached a record-breaking 18.3 million viewers, making it the most-watched conference championship in college football history.

As the No. 1 seed in the playoff, they received a first-round bye and played in the Rose Bowl, Indiana's second Rose Bowl appearance (the other being in 1967) and the Hoosiers' third appearance in a major bowl or equivalent. They defeated No. 9 Alabama 38–3 for their first-ever Rose Bowl victory, and became the first top-4 seed to win in the expanded 12-team playoff coming off a bye. This was also the first bowl victory for Indiana since the 1991 Copper Bowl. With the win, they advanced to the national semifinal at the Peach Bowl against the Oregon Ducks. In a rematch of a regular-season game on October 11, they won 56–22, with Fernando Mendoza throwing 5 touchdown passes, marking his second consecutive game with more touchdown passes than incompletions and his fifth of the season, a feat not achieved since the turn of the century.

With the win, the team advanced to the College Football Playoff National Championship, their first ever appearance in a national championship game. They defeated the Miami Hurricanes 27–21 at Hard Rock Stadium on January 19, 2026 to win their first national championship in program history. With the feat, they became the first FBS team to compile a perfect 16-win season since the 1894 Yale Bulldogs, the first Big Ten team other than Michigan or Ohio State to win a consensus national championship since Minnesota in 1960, and the first new team to win a national championship since Florida in 1996. This team also became the first Hoosiers' athletic program to win a national championship and complete an undefeated season since the 1975–76 men's basketball team. The 2025 Indiana Hoosiers are regarded as one of the greatest turnarounds in sports history, as they were just two seasons removed from a 3–9 record and prior to the season had the most all-time losses among FBS college football programs, and Cignetti compiling an astonishing 27–2 record in his first two seasons with Indiana.

== Offseason ==
=== Departures ===
- RB Ty Son Lawton
- WR Andison Coby
- TE Trey Walker
- OL Mike Katic
- OL Nick Kidwell
- OL Tyler Stephens
- DE Lanell Carr Jr.
- DE Jacob Mangum-Farrar
- S Josh Sanguinetti
- K Derek McCormick
- P James Evans
- DB Shawn Asbury II
- WR Miles Cross
- DB Cedarius Doss
- RB Justice Ellison
- DB Terry Jones Jr.
- DB Nic Toomer

==== NFL draft ====
Name	Pos.	Team	Round	Pick
CJ West	DL	San Francisco 49ers	4	113
Kurtis Rourke	QB	San Francisco 49ers	7	227
James Carpenter	DT	Jacksonville Jaguars	Undrafted	
Zach Horton	TE	Detroit Lions	Undrafted	
Myles Price	WR	Minnesota Vikings	Undrafted	
Jailin Walker	LB	Las Vegas Raiders	Undrafted	
Trey Wedig	OL	Los Angeles Rams	Undrafted	
Ke'Shawn Williams	WR	Pittsburgh Steelers	Undrafted	

==== CFL draft ====
Name	Pos.	Team	Round	Pick
Kurtis Rourke	QB	Saskatchewan Roughriders	3	25

==== Outgoing transfers ====
Name	No.	Pos.	Height	Weight	Year	Hometown	New school
Josh Philostin	0	DB	5' 11"	180 lbs	Fr.	Palm Beach, FL	Rhode Island
Donaven McCulley	1	WR	6' 5"	203 lbs		Indianapolis, IN	Michigan
Makai Jackson	2	WR	6' 0"	200 lbs	RS-Sr.	Levittown, PA	Liberty
Tayven Jackson	2	QB	6' 4"	212 lbs		Greenwood, IN	UCF
JoJo Johnson	3	CB	6' 0"	184 lbs		Merrillville, IN	Bowling Green
E.J. Williams Jr.	7	WR	6' 4"	203 lbs		Phenix City, AL	Withdrew/remained at IU
Jamier Johnson	9	DB	5' 11"	181 lbs	RS-Jr.	Pasadena, CA	UCLA
DJ Warnell Jr.	10	S	6' 3"	200 lbs		La Marque, TX	North Texas
Roman Purcell	12	QB	6' 1"	214 lbs		Indianapolis, IN	California (PA)
Tyrik McDaniel	17	S	6' 1"	195 lbs		Columbia, SC	The Citadel
Elijah Green	21	RB	6' 0"	207 lbs		Roswell, GA	Sam Houston
Jamison Kelly	21	S	6' 0"	190 lbs		Columbia, MS	TBD
Joshua Rudolph	26	LB	6' 0"	225 lbs		Montgomery, AL	UTEP
Jaz Boykin	28	CB	6' 0"	178 lbs		Fishers, IN	Hampton
Nahji Logan	33	LB	6' 3"	226 lbs		Yeadon, PA	Nevada
Ta'Derius Collins	49	DL	6' 4"	250 lbs	RS-Fr.	Shreveport, LA	Texas State
Vince Fiacable	53	OL	6' 4"	315 lbs	RS-Jr.	Fort Wayne, IN	Florida Atlantic
Caleb King	54	DE	6' 5"	261 lbs		Georgetown, IN	TBD
Venson Sneed Jr.	55	DE	6' 4"	265 lbs		Winter Park, FL	Western Kentucky
Noah Bolticoff	66	OL	6' 5"	300 lbs		Rose Hill, KS	North Alabama
Austin Barrett	73	OL	6' 6"	308 lbs	RS-Fr.	Bloomingdale, IL	Iowa State
Brady Simmons	81	WR	6' 1"	160 lbs		Indianapolis, IN	Miami (OH)
Brody Kosin	82	TE	6' 6"	237 lbs	Fr.	Clarkston, MI	Miami (OH)
Brody Foley	86	TE	6' 6"	255 lbs	RS-So.	Cincinnati, OH	Tulsa
Sam West	88	TE	6' 4"	246 lbs	RS-Fr.	Geeensburg, IN	Mississippi State
Marcus Burris Jr.	92	DL	6' 5"	286 lbs	RS-Jr.	Texarkana, TX	Memphis
Robby Harrison	93	DL	6' 4"	298 lbs	RS-So.	Greenwood, SC	Western Kentucky
Jamari Farmer		LB	6' 0"	210 lbs	Fr.	Mooresville, NC	East Tennessee State

=== Acquisitions ===
==== Incoming transfers ====
Name	No.	Pos.	Height	Weight	Year	Hometown	Prev. school
Jonathan Brady	#0	WR	5' 10"	183 lbs	Sr.	Los Angeles, CA	California
Hosea Wheeler	#0	DL	6' 3"	300 lbs	RS-Sr.	Elk Grove, CA	Western Kentucky
Roman Hemby	#1	RB	6' 0"	208 lbs	RS-Sr.	Bel Air, MD	Maryland
Makai Jackson	#2	WR	6' 0"	200 lbs	Sr.	Levittown, PA	Appalachian State
Grant Wilson	#5	QB	6' 3"	217 lbs	RS-Sr.+	Milton, GA	Old Dominion
Louis Moore	#7	S	5' 11"	200 lbs	Gr.	Mesquite, TX	Ole Miss
Stephen Daley	#8	DL	6' 1"	273 lbs	Sr.	Winchester, VA	Kent State
Tyler Morris	#9	WR	5' 11"	185 lbs	Sr.	Bolingbrook, IL	Michigan
Ryland Gandy	#10	CB	6' 0"	180 lbs	RS-Jr.	Buford, GA	Pittsburgh
Devan Boykin	#12	CB	5' 11"	175 lbs	Gr.	Jamestown, NC	NC State
Kellan Wyatt	#13	EDGE	6' 2"	212 lbs	Sr.	Severn, MD	Maryland
Fernando Mendoza	#15	QB	6' 5"	225 lbs	RS-Jr.	Miami, FL	California
Holden Staes	#19	TE	6' 4"	248 lbs	Sr.	Atlanta, GA	Tennessee
Amariyun Knighten	#23	CB	6' 0"	174 lbs	RS-Jr.	Deerfield Beach, FL	Northern Illinois
Lee Beebe Jr.	#29	RB	5' 10"	220 lbs	RS-Jr.	Montgomery, AL	UAB
Brendan Franke	#35	K	6' 3"	225 lbs	RS-Sr.+	Gretna, NE	Texas State
Riley Nowakowski	#37	TE	6' 1"	243 lbs	RS-Sr.+	Milwaukee, WI	Wisconsin
Mitch McCarthy	#44	P	6' 5"	230 lbs	Sr.	Melbourne, AUS	UCF
Sam Lindsey	#45	LS	6' 0"	185 lbs	RS-So.	Lilburn, GA	Georgia State
Kahlil Benson	#67	OL	6' 6"	305 lbs	RS-Sr.+	Southaven, MS	Colorado
Zen Michalski	#75	OL	6' 6"	319 lbs	RS-Sr.	Floyds Knobs, IN	Ohio State
Pat Coogan	#78	OL	6' 5"	311 lbs	RS-Sr.	Palos Heights, IL	Notre Dame
Dominique Ratcliff	#91	DL	6' 3"	285 lbs	RS-Sr.+	Conroe, TX	Texas State

==== Recruiting class ====
College recruiting (2025)
Name	Hometown	School	Height	Weight	Commit date
Byron Baldwin; DB	Baltimore, MD	Saint Frances Academy	6 ft 2 in (1.88 m)	185 lb (84 kg)	Nov 15, 2024
Byron Baldwin; DB	Recruit ratings: Rivals: 247Sports: ESPN: (81)				
LeBron Bond; WR	Norfolk, VA	Matthew Fontaine Maury	5 ft 10 in (1.78 m)	165 lb (75 kg)	Apr 7, 2024
LeBron Bond; WR	Recruit ratings: Rivals: 247Sports: ESPN: (80)				
Triston Abram; DE	St. Louis, MO	Christian Brothers College	6 ft 3 in (1.91 m)	220 lb (100 kg)	Jun 23, 2024
Triston Abram; DE	Recruit ratings: Rivals: 247Sports: ESPN: (79)				
Tyrone Burrus Jr. DE	Indianapolis, IN	Warren Central	6 ft 4 in (1.93 m)	220 lb (100 kg)	Nov 14, 2024
Tyrone Burrus Jr. DE	Recruit ratings: Rivals: 247Sports: ESPN: (79)				
Davion Chandler; WR	Indianapolis, IN	Lawrence North	5 ft 11 in (1.80 m)	175 lb (79 kg)	Jun 25, 2024
Davion Chandler; WR	Recruit ratings: Rivals: 247Sports: ESPN: (78)				
Blake Thiry; TE	Prairie du Chien, WI	Prairie du Chien	6 ft 4 in (1.93 m)	220 lb (100 kg)	Apr 16, 2024
Blake Thiry; TE	Recruit ratings: Rivals: 247Sports: ESPN:				
Seaonta Stewart Jr. ATH	Cincinnati, OH	Winton Woods	6 ft 2 in (1.88 m)	175 lb (79 kg)	Jul 8, 2024
Seaonta Stewart Jr. ATH	Recruit ratings: Rivals: 247Sports: ESPN:				
Jaylen Bell; DB	Loganville, GA	Grayson	5 ft 11 in (1.80 m)	170 lb (77 kg)	Jun 1, 2024
Jaylen Bell; DB	Recruit ratings: Rivals: 247Sports: ESPN:				
Baylor Wilkin; OL	Findlay, OH		6 ft 5 in (1.96 m)	278 lb (126 kg)	Jul 9, 2024
Baylor Wilkin; OL	Recruit ratings: Rivals: 247Sports: ESPN:				
Paul Nelson; LB	Cincinnati, OH		6 ft 2 in (1.88 m)	205 lb (93 kg)	Jul 9, 2024
Paul Nelson; LB	Recruit ratings: Rivals: 247Sports: ESPN:				
Myles Kendrick; WR	Jacksonville, FL		6 ft 0 in (1.83 m)	165 lb (75 kg)	Jun 29, 2024
Myles Kendrick; WR	Recruit ratings: Rivals: 247Sports: ESPN:				
Kyler Garcia; DT	Nashville, TN		6 ft 5 in (1.96 m)	275 lb (125 kg)	Jun 26, 2024
Kyler Garcia; DT	Recruit ratings: Rivals: 247Sports: ESPN:				
Andrew Barker; TE	Kokomo, IN		6 ft 2 in (1.88 m)	228 lb (103 kg)	Jun 23, 2024
Andrew Barker; TE	Recruit ratings: Rivals: 247Sports: ESPN:				
Zacharey Smith; DB	Hapeville, GA		6 ft 0 in (1.83 m)	165 lb (75 kg)	Jun 20, 2024
Zacharey Smith; DB	Recruit ratings: Rivals: 247Sports: ESPN:				
Keishaun Calhoun; DE	Groveport, OH		6 ft 4 in (1.93 m)	230 lb (100 kg)	Jun 20, 2024
Keishaun Calhoun; DE	Recruit ratings: Rivals: 247Sports: ESPN:				
Jamari Farmer; LB	Mooresville, NC		5 ft 11 in (1.80 m)	192 lb (87 kg)	Jun 17, 2024
Jamari Farmer; LB	Recruit ratings: Rivals: 247Sports: ESPN:				
Jhrevious Hall; DT	Columbia, TN		6 ft 2 in (1.88 m)	270 lb (120 kg)	Jun 4, 2024
Jhrevious Hall; DT	Recruit ratings: Rivals: 247Sports: ESPN:				
Sean Cuono; RB	Clearwater, FL		5 ft 11 in (1.80 m)	190 lb (86 kg)	Jun 3, 2024
Sean Cuono; RB	Recruit ratings: Rivals: 247Sports: ESPN:				
Garrett Reese; DB	LaGrange Park, IL		6 ft 3 in (1.91 m)	175 lb (79 kg)	Feb 16, 2024
Garrett Reese; DB	Recruit ratings: Rivals: 247Sports: ESPN:				
Evan Parker; OL	Carmel, IN		6 ft 3 in (1.91 m)	305 lb (138 kg)	Feb 5, 2024
Evan Parker; OL	Recruit ratings: Rivals: 247Sports: ESPN:				
Matt Marek; OL	Orland Park, IL		6 ft 4 in (1.93 m)	295 lb (134 kg)	Jan 31, 2024
Matt Marek; OL	Recruit ratings: Rivals: 247Sports: ESPN:				
Overall recruit ranking:
Note: In many cases, Scout, Rivals, 247Sports, On3, and ESPN may conflict in their listings of height and weight.; In these cases, the average was taken. ESPN grades are on a 100-point scale.; Sources: "Rivals commits". Rivals.; "ESPN commits". ESPN.; "2025 Team Ranking". Rivals.com.; "247Sports commits". 247Sports.

== Preseason ==
=== Spring game ===
Fernando Mendoza was "firmly entrenched as the starter" after spring football camp. Fernando's brother, Alberto Mendoza was the first backup, followed by Old Dominion transfer Grant Wilson.

Date	Time	Spring Game	Site	TV	Result	Source
April 17	8:00	Offense vs. Defense	Memorial Stadium • Bloomington, IN		31–23 (Offense)	

=== Big Ten media days ===
Indiana was projected to finish sixth in the Big Ten in the preseason media poll.

== Schedule ==
Date	Time	Opponent	Rank	Site	TV	Result	Attendance
August 30	2:30 p.m.	Old Dominion*	No. 20	Memorial Stadium; Bloomington, IN	FS1	W 27–14	47,109
September 6	12:00 p.m.	Kennesaw State*	No. 23	Memorial Stadium; Bloomington, IN	FS1	W 56–9	43,801
September 12	6:30 p.m.	Indiana State*	No. 22	Memorial Stadium; Bloomington, IN	BTN	W 73–0	46,219
September 20	7:30 p.m.	No. 9 Illinois	No. 19	Memorial Stadium; Bloomington, IN (rivalry)	NBC	W 63–10	56,088
September 27	3:30 p.m.	at Iowa	No. 11	Kinnick Stadium; Iowa City, IA	Peacock	W 20–15	69,250
October 11	3:30 p.m.	at No. 3 Oregon	No. 7	Autzen Stadium; Eugene, OR (College GameDay)	CBS	W 30–20	59,625
October 18	3:30 p.m.	Michigan State^{†}	No. 3	Memorial Stadium; Bloomington, IN (Old Brass Spittoon)	Peacock	W 38–13	55,165
October 25	12:00 p.m.	UCLA	No. 2	Memorial Stadium; Bloomington, IN (Big Noon Kickoff)	FOX	W 56–6	54,867
November 1	3:30 p.m.	at Maryland	No. 2	SECU Stadium; College Park, MD	CBS	W 55–10	46,185
November 8	12:00 p.m.	at Penn State	No. 2	Beaver Stadium; University Park, PA	FOX	W 27–24	105,231
November 15	12:00 p.m.	Wisconsin	No. 2	Memorial Stadium; Bloomington, IN	BTN	W 31–7	55,042
November 28	7:30 p.m.	at Purdue	No. 2	Ross–Ade Stadium; West Lafayette, IN (Old Oaken Bucket)	NBC	W 56–3	59,807
December 6	8:00 p.m.	vs. No. 1 Ohio State	No. 2	Lucas Oil Stadium; Indianapolis, IN (Big Ten Championship Game, Big Noon Kickoff)	FOX	W 13–10	68,214
January 1, 2026	4:00 p.m.	vs. (9) No. 9 Alabama*	(1) No. 1	Rose Bowl; Pasadena, CA (Rose Bowl–CFP Quarterfinal, College GameDay)	ESPN	W 38–3	90,278
January 9, 2026	7:30 p.m.	vs. (5) No. 5 Oregon*	(1) No. 1	Mercedes-Benz Stadium; Atlanta, GA (Peach Bowl–CFP Semifinal, College GameDay)	ESPN	W 56–22	75,604
January 19, 2026	7:30 p.m.	at (10) No. 10 Miami (FL)*	(1) No. 1	Hard Rock Stadium; Miami Gardens, FL (CFP National Championship, College GameDay)	ESPN	W 27–21	67,227
*Non-conference game; ^{†}Homecoming; Rankings from AP Poll (and CFP Rankings, after November 4) - Released prior to game; All times are in Eastern time; Source:

== Rankings ==
Ranking movements Legend: ██ Increase in ranking ██ Decrease in ranking ( ) = First-place votes
	Week																
Poll	Pre	1	2	3	4	5	6	7	8	9	10	11	12	13	14	15	Final
AP	20	23	22	19	11	8	7	3 (3)	2 (6)	2 (11)	2 (11)	2 (6)	2 (8)	2 (7)	2 (5)	1 (66)	1 (66)
Coaches	19	21	19	17	12	9	7	3 (1)	2	2	2 (1)	2	2	2	2	1 (61)	1 (62)
CFP	Not released										2	2	2	2	2	1	Not released

== Game summaries ==
=== vs Old Dominion ===
Old Dominion Monarchs (0–0) at No. 20 Indiana Hoosiers (0–0) – Game summary

Quarter	1	2	3	4	Total
Monarchs	7	0	0	7	14
No. 20 Hoosiers	7	10	10	0	27

at Memorial Stadium • Bloomington, Indiana

- Date: August 30
- Game time: 2:30 p.m.
- Game weather: Sunny • Temperature: 75 °F (24 °C) • Wind: NE 8 mph
- Game attendance: 47,109
- Referee: Tim O'Dey
- TV announcers (FS1): Noah Reed (play-by-play) and Robert Smith (analyst)

Game information

First quarter

- ODU – Colton Joseph 75-yard run (Riley Callaghan kick), 14:49. Monarchs 7–0. Drive: 1 play, 75 yards, 0:11.
- IU – Jonathan Brady 91-yard punt return (Nico Radicic kick), 0:09. Tied 7–7.

Second quarter

- IU – Nico Radicic 22-yard field goal, 10:03. Hoosiers 10–7. Drive: 8 plays, 51 yards, 3:35.
- IU – Fernando Mendoza 5-yard run (Nico Radicic kick), 3:36. Hoosiers 17–7. Drive: 3 plays, 5 yards, 0:15.

Third quarter

- IU – Kaelon Black 2-yard run (Nico Radicic kick), 11:09. Hoosiers 24–7. Drive: 8 plays, 75 yards, 3:51.
- IU – Nico Radicic 25-yard field goal, 3:02. Hoosiers 27–7. Drive: 13 plays, 69 yards, 6:58.

Fourth quarter

- ODU – Colton Joseph 78-yard run (Riley Callaghan kick), 6:53. Hoosiers 27–14. Drive: 4 plays, 97 yards, 1:21.

Statistics	ODU	IU
First downs	10	29
Total yards	45–314	89–502
Rushing yards	23–218	57–309
Passing yards	96	193
Passing: Comp–Att–Int	11–22–3	18–32–0
Turnovers	3	1
Time of possession	18:32	41:28

Team	Category	Player	Statistics
Old Dominion	Passing	Colton Joseph	11/22, 96 yards, 3 INT
Old Dominion	Rushing	Colton Joseph	10 carries, 179 yards, 2 TD
Old Dominion	Receiving	Naeem Abdul-Rahim-Gladding	4 receptions, 35 yards
Indiana	Passing	Fernando Mendoza	18/31, 193 yards
Indiana	Rushing	Roman Hemby	23 carries, 111 yards
Indiana	Receiving	Omar Cooper Jr.	2 receptions, 52 yards

=== vs Kennesaw State ===
Kennesaw State Owls (0–1) at No. 23 Indiana Hoosiers (1–0) – Game summary

Quarter	1	2	3	4	Total
Owls	0	6	3	0	9
No. 23 Hoosiers	14	7	21	14	56

at Memorial Stadium • Bloomington, Indiana

- Date: September 6
- Game time: 12:00 p.m.
- Game weather: Sunny
- Game attendance: 43,801
- Referee: Chris La Mange
- TV announcers (FS1): Tim Brando (play-by-play), Devin Gardner (analyst), and Josh Sims (sideline reporter)

Game information

First quarter

- IU – Riley Nowakowski 1-yard run (Nico Radicic kick), 8:28. Hoosiers 7–0. Drive: 8 plays, 81 yards, 3:35.
- IU – Elijah Sarratt 9-yard pass from Fernando Mendoza (Nico Radicic kick), 3:45. Hoosiers 14–0. Drive: 6 plays, 48 yards, 3:16.

Second quarter

- KENN – Daniel Kinney 28-yard field goal, 5:46. Hoosiers 14–3. Drive: 12 plays, 63 yards, 4:50.
- IU – Lee Beebe Jr. 11-yard run (Nico Radicic kick), 3:40. Hoosiers 21–3. Drive: 4 plays, 75 yards, 2:06.
- KENN – Daniel Kinney 29-yard field goal, 0:28. Hoosiers 21–6. Drive: 7 plays, 64 yards, 3:12.

Third quarter

- KENN – Daniel Kinney 50-yard field goal, 12:39. Hoosiers 21–9. Drive: 6 plays, 44 yards, 2:21.
- IU – Elijah Sarratt 3-yard pass from Fernando Mendoza (Nico Radicic kick), 8:43. Hoosiers 28–9. Drive: 8 plays, 73 yards, 3:52.
- IU – Omar Cooper Jr. 75-yard run (Nico Radicic kick), 6:05. Hoosiers 35–9. Drive: 1 play, 75 yards, 0:17.
- IU – Elijah Sarratt 20-yard pass from Fernando Mendoza (Nico Radicic kick), 2:53. Hoosiers 42–9. Drive: 4 plays, 37 yards, 1:42.

Fourth quarter

- IU – E.J. Williams Jr. 8-yard pass from Fernando Mendoza (Nico Radicic kick), 13:17. Hoosiers 49–9. Drive: 7 plays, 63 yards, 2:51.
- IU – Charlie Becker 6-yard pass from Alberto Mendoza (Nico Radicic kick), 6:03. Hoosiers 56–9. Drive: 8 plays, 87 yards, 4:13.

Statistics	KENN	IU
First downs	10	28
Plays–yards	53–271	67–593
Rushes–yards	32–89	39–313
Passing yards	182	280
Passing: comp–att–int	13–21–1	21–28–0
Turnovers	2	0
Time of possession	27:30	32:30

Team	Category	Player	Statistics
Kennesaw State	Passing	Amari Odom	10/16, 176 yards, INT
Kennesaw State	Rushing	Coleman Bennett	5 carries, 34 yards
Kennesaw State	Receiving	Lyndon Ravare	2 receptions, 72 yards
Indiana	Passing	Fernando Mendoza	18/25, 245 yards, 4 TD
Indiana	Rushing	Lee Beebe Jr.	11 carries, 90 yards, TD
Indiana	Receiving	Elijah Sarratt	9 receptions, 97 yards, 3 TD

=== vs Indiana State (FCS) ===
Indiana State Sycamores (FCS) (2–0) at No. 22 Indiana Hoosiers (2–0) – Game summary

Quarter	1	2	3	4	Total
Sycamores (FCS)	0	0	0	0	0
No. 22 Hoosiers	21	24	21	7	73

at Memorial Stadium • Bloomington, Indiana

- Date: September 12
- Game time: 6:30 p.m.
- Game weather: Sunny • Temperature: 83 °F (28 °C) • Wind: NE at 2 miles per hour (3.2 km/h)
- Game attendance: 46,219
- Referee: Kole Knueppel
- TV announcers (BTN): Lisa Byington (play-by-play), Jared Thomas (analyst), and Melanie Ricks (sideline reporter)

Game information

First quarter

- IU – Fernando Mendoza 7-yard run (Nico Radicic kick), 11:22. Hoosiers 7–0. Drive: 7 plays, 66 yards, 3:30.
- IU – Omar Cooper Jr. 13-yard pass from Fernando Mendoza (Nico Radicic kick), 4:42. Hoosiers 14–0. Drive: 9 plays, 78 yards, 5:13.
- IU – Omar Cooper Jr. 13-yard pass from Fernando Mendoza (Nico Radicic kick), 1:07. Hoosiers 21–0. Drive: 5 plays, 31 yards, 2:02.

Second quarter

- IU – Nico Radicic 25-yard field goal, 10:28. Hoosiers 24–0. Drive: 8 plays, 37 yards, 3:37.
- IU – Holden Staes 18-yard pass from Fernando Mendoza (Nico Radicic kick), 7:56. Hoosiers 31–0. Drive: 3 plays, 65 yards, 1:24.
- IU – Jonathan Brady 4-yard pass from Fernando Mendoza (Nico Radicic kick), 5:03. Hoosiers 38–0. Drive: 2 plays, 35 yards, 0:33.
- IU – Omar Cooper Jr. 31-yard pass from Fernando Mendoza (Nico Radicic kick), 1:51. Hoosiers 45–0. Drive: 3 plays, 45 yards, 0:36.

Third quarter

- IU – Omar Cooper Jr. 58-yard pass from Alberto Mendoza (Nico Radicic kick), 11:51. Hoosiers 52–0. Drive: 4 plays, 72 yards, 1:22.
- IU – Jonathan Brady 12-yard pass from Alberto Mendoza (Nico Radicic kick), 6:15. Hoosiers 59–0. Drive: 8 plays, 70 yards, 3:46.
- IU – Khobie Martin 20-yard run (Nico Radicic kick), 1:22. Hoosiers 66–0. Drive: 5 plays, 61 yards, 2:51.

Fourth quarter

- IU – Khobie Martin 1-yard run (Nico Radicic kick), 2:18. Hoosiers 73–0. Drive: 10 plays, 80 yards, 6:13.

Statistics	INST	IU
First downs	5	33
Plays–yards	59–77	67–680
Rushes–yards	31–39	37–301
Passing yards	38	379
Passing: comp–att–int	11–20–0	26–30–0
Turnovers	0	0
Time of possession	26:08	33:37

Team	Category	Player	Statistics
Indiana State	Passing	Brock Riddle	3/4, 25 yards
Indiana State	Rushing	Angelo St. Louis	5 carries, 22 yards
Indiana State	Receiving	Keshon Singleton	1 reception, 17 yards
Indiana	Passing	Fernando Mendoza	19/20, 270 yards, 5 TD
Indiana	Rushing	Khobie Martin	11 carries, 109 yards, 2 TD
Indiana	Receiving	Omar Cooper Jr.	10 receptions, 207 yards, 4 TD

=== vs No. 9 Illinois (rivalry) ===
No. 9 Illinois Fighting Illini (3–0) at No. 19 Indiana Hoosiers (3–0) – Game summary

Quarter	1	2	3	4	Total
No. 9 Fighting Illini	7	3	0	0	10
No. 19 Hoosiers	14	21	14	14	63

at Memorial Stadium • Bloomington, Indiana

- Date: September 20
- Game time: 7:30 p.m.
- Game weather: Clear • Temperature: 75 °F (24 °C) • Wind: S at 2 miles per hour (3.2 km/h)
- Game attendance: 56,088
- Referee: Chris Coyte
- TV announcers (NBC): Noah Eagle (play-by-play), Todd Blackledge (analyst), and Kathryn Tappen (sideline reporter)

Game information

First quarter

- IU – D'Angelo Ponds 11-yard return of blocked punt (Nico Radicic kick), 9:26. Hoosiers 7–0.
- ILL – Collin Dixon 59-yard pass from Luke Altmyer (David Olano kick), 8:24. Tied 7–7. Drive: 3 plays, 75 yards, 1:02.
- IU – Omar Cooper Jr. 11-yard pass from Fernando Mendoza (Nico Radicic kick), 4:41. Hoosiers 14–7. Drive: 7 plays, 75 yards, 3:43.

Second quarter

- IU – E.J. Williams Jr. 11-yard pass from Fernando Mendoza (Nico Radicic kick), 11:05. Hoosiers 21–7. Drive: 7 plays, 56 yards, 3:41.
- IU – Riley Nowakowski 43-yard pass from Fernando Mendoza (Nico Radicic kick), 6:17. Hoosiers 28–7. Drive: 4 plays, 80 yards, 2:19.
- IU – Elijah Sarratt 9-yard pass from Fernando Mendoza (Nico Radicic kick), 1:09. Hoosiers 35–7. Drive: 9 plays, 65 yards, 3:14.
- ILL – David Olano 46-yard field goal, 0:00. Hoosiers 35–10. Drive: 8 plays, 47 yards, 1:09.

Third quarter

- IU – Kaelon Black 40-yard run (Nico Radicic kick), 11:38. Hoosiers 42–10. Drive: 7 plays, 75 yards, 3:22.
- IU – Elijah Sarratt 5-yard pass from Fernando Mendoza (Nico Radicic kick), 5:02. Hoosiers 49–10. Drive: 9 plays, 44 yards, 4:57.

Fourth quarter

- IU – Khobie Martin 31-yard run (Nico Radicic kick), 14:09. Hoosiers 56–10. Drive: 8 plays, 69 yards, 5:07.
- IU – Khobie Martin 8-yard run (Nico Radicic kick), 6:38. Hoosiers 63–10. Drive: 8 plays, 67 yards, 5:23.

Statistics	ILL	IU
First downs	9	31
Plays–yards	45–161	72–579
Rushes–yards	20–2	49–312
Passing yards	159	267
Passing: comp–att–int	16–25–1	21–23–0
Turnovers	1	0
Time of possession	20:17	39:43

Team	Category	Player	Statistics
Illinois	Passing	Luke Altmyer	14/22, 146 yards, TD
Illinois	Rushing	Kaden Feagin	5 carries, 18 yards
Illinois	Receiving	Collin Dixon	4 receptions, 86 yards, TD
Indiana	Passing	Fernando Mendoza	21/23, 267 yards, 5 TD
Indiana	Rushing	Khobie Martin	12 carries, 107 yards, 2 TD
Indiana	Receiving	Elijah Sarratt	9 receptions, 92 yards, 2 TD

=== at Iowa ===
No. 11 Indiana Hoosiers (4–0) at Iowa Hawkeyes (3–1) – Game summary

Quarter	1	2	3	4	Total
No. 11 Hoosiers	7	3	0	10	20
Hawkeyes	3	7	0	5	15

at Kinnick Stadium • Iowa City, Iowa

- Date: September 27
- Game time: 3:30 p.m.
- Game weather: Sunny • Temperature: 85 °F (29 °C) • Wind: SW at 10 miles per hour (16 km/h)
- Game attendance: 69,251
- Referee: Greg Blum
- TV announcers (Peacock): Paul Burmeister (play-by-play), Phil Simms (analyst), and Caroline Pineda (sideline reporter)

Game information

First quarter

- IU – Omar Cooper Jr. 14-yard pass from Fernando Mendoza (Nico Radicic kick), 13:33. Hoosiers 7–0. Drive: 2 plays, 24 yards, 0:43.
- IOWA – Drew Stevens 40-yard field goal, 6:25. Hoosiers 7–3. Drive: 5 plays, 23 yards, 2:17.

Second quarter

- IOWA – Mark Gronowski 3-yard run (Drew Stevens kick), 0:22. Hawkeyes 10–7. Drive: 11 plays, 73 yards, 5:31.
- IU – Nico Radicic 46-yard field goal, 0:03. Tied 10–10. Drive: 3 plays, 47 yards, 0:19.

Third quarter

- No scoring plays.

Fourth quarter

- IOWA – Drew Stevens 54-yard field goal, 12:43. Hawkeyes 13–10. Drive: 5 plays, 11 yards, 2:13.
- IU – Nico Radicic 44-yard field goal, 9:47. Tied 13–13. Drive: 8 plays, 49 yards, 2:56.
- IU – Elijah Sarratt 49-yard pass from Fernando Mendoza (Nico Radicic kick), 1:28. Hoosiers 20–13. Drive: 5 plays, 76 yards, 0:33.
- IOWA – Fernando Mendoza tackled in the end zone for a safety, 0:00. Hoosiers 20–15.

Statistics	IU	IOWA
First downs	18	17
Plays–yards	62–337	69–284
Rushes–yards	39–104	31–92
Passing yards	233	192
Passing: comp–att–int	13–23–1	24–38–2
Turnovers	1	2
Time of possession	27:18	32:42

Team	Category	Player	Statistics
Indiana	Passing	Fernando Mendoza	13/23, 233 yards, 2 TD, INT
Indiana	Rushing	Roman Hemby	15 carries, 86 yards
Indiana	Receiving	Elijah Sarratt	6 receptions, 132 yards, TD
Iowa	Passing	Mark Gronowski	19/25, 144 yards, INT
Iowa	Rushing	Kamari Moulton	18 carries, 75 yards
Iowa	Receiving	Sam Phillips	5 receptions, 64 yards

=== at No. 3 Oregon ===
No. 7 Indiana Hoosiers (5–0) at No. 3 Oregon Ducks (5–0) – Game summary

Quarter	1	2	3	4	Total
No. 7 Hoosiers	10	3	7	10	30
No. 3 Ducks	7	3	3	7	20

at Autzen Stadium • Eugene, Oregon

- Date: October 11
- Game time: 3:30 PM EDT
- Game weather: Cloudy • Temperature: 56 °F (13 °C) • Wind: SW at 10 miles per hour (16 km/h)
- Game attendance: 59,625
- Referee: Jeff Servinski
- TV announcers (CBS): Brad Nessler (play-by-play), Gary Danielson (analyst), and Jenny Dell (sideline reporter)

Game information

First quarter

- IU – Nico Radicic 42-yard field goal, 9:42. Hoosiers 3–0. Drive: 5 plays, 22 yards, 1:27.
- ORE – Malik Benson 44-yard pass from Dante Moore (Atticus Sappington kick), 5:15. Ducks 7–3. Drive: 3 plays, 51 yards, 0:43.
- IU – Roman Hemby 3-yard run (Nico Radicic kick), 0:15. Hoosiers 10–7. Drive: 9 plays, 75 yards, 5:00.

Second quarter

- ORE – Atticus Sappington 40-yard field goal, 9:18. Tied 10–10. Drive: 12 plays, 53 yards, 5:57.
- IU – Brendan Franke 58-yard field goal, 0:01. Hoosiers 13–10. Drive: 3 plays, 40 yards, 0:23.

Third quarter

- ORE – Atticus Sappington 33-yard field goal, 7:10. Tied 13–13. Drive: 8 plays, 22 yards, 3:19.
- IU – Roman Hemby 2-yard run (Nico Radicic kick), 2:16. Hoosiers 20–13. Drive: 9 plays, 75 yards, 4:54.

Fourth quarter

- ORE – Brandon Finney Jr. 35-yard interception return (Atticus Sappington kick), 12:42. Tied 20–20. Drive: 3 plays, 8 yards, 1:27.
- IU – Elijah Sarratt 8-yard pass from Fernando Mendoza (Nico Radicic kick), 6:23. Hoosiers 27–20. Drive: 12 plays, 75 yards, 6:19.
- IU – Brendan Franke 22-yard field goal, 2:06. Hoosiers 30–20. Drive: 9 plays, 28 yards, 3:57.

Statistics	IU	ORE
First downs	23	14
Plays–yards	64–343	64–267
Rushes–yards	33–128	30–81
Passing yards	215	186
Passing: comp–att–int	20–31–1	21–34–2
Turnovers	1	2
Time of possession	33:10	26:50

Team	Category	Player	Statistics
Indiana	Passing	Fernando Mendoza	20/31, 215 yards, TD, INT
Indiana	Rushing	Roman Hemby	19 carries, 70 yards, 2 TD
Indiana	Receiving	Elijah Sarratt	8 receptions, 121 yards, TD
Oregon	Passing	Dante Moore	21/34, 186 yards, TD, 2 INT
Oregon	Rushing	Jordon Davison	8 carries, 59 yards
Oregon	Receiving	Malik Benson	1 reception, 44 yards, TD

This win marked the first time in program history that the Hoosiers defeated a top-5 ranked opponent on the road.

=== vs Michigan State (Old Brass Spittoon) ===
Michigan State Spartans (3–3) at No. 3 Indiana Hoosiers (6–0) – Game summary

Quarter	1	2	3	4	Total
Spartans	3	7	0	3	13
No. 3 Hoosiers	7	14	14	3	38

at Memorial Stadium • Bloomington, Indiana

- Date: October 18
- Game time: 3:30 p.m.
- Game weather: Cloudy
- Game attendance: 55,165
- Referee: Chris Coyte
- TV announcers (Peacock): Dan Hicks (play-by-play), Jason Garrett (analyst), and Zora Stephenson (sideline reporter)

Game information

First quarter

- MSU – Martin Connington 38-yard field goal, 8:07. Spartans 3–0. Drive: 13 plays, 55 yards, 6:53.
- IU – E.J. Williams Jr. 13-yard pass from Fernando Mendoza (Nico Radicic kick), 2:40. Hoosiers 7–3. Drive: 11 plays, 75 yards, 5:27.

Second quarter

- MSU – Nick Marsh 15-yard pass from Aidan Chiles (Martin Connington kick), 9:22. Spartans 10–7. Drive: 12 plays, 75 yards, 8:18.
- IU – Elijah Sarratt 24-yard pass from Fernando Mendoza (Nico Radicic kick), 6:47. Hoosiers 14–10. Drive: 5 plays, 75 yards, 2:35.
- IU - Kaelon Black 29-yard run (Nico Radicic kick), 0:59. Hoosiers 21–10. Drive: 8 plays, 80 yards, 1:47.

Third quarter

- IU – Omar Cooper Jr. 48-yard pass from Fernando Mendoza (Nico Radicic kick), 13:09. Hoosiers 28–10. Drive: 4 plays, 75 yards, 1:51.
- IU – Elijah Sarratt 27-yard pass from Fernando Mendoza (Nico Radicic kick), 3:55. Hoosiers 35–10. Drive: 8 plays, 68 yards, 4:01.

Fourth quarter

- IU – Nico Radicic 31-yard field goal, 1:56. Hoosiers 38–10. Drive: 11 plays, 54 yards, 7:03.
- MSU – Martin Connington 34-yard field goal, 0:33. Hoosiers 38–13. Drive: 8 plays, 59 yards, 1:23.

Statistics	MSU	IU
First downs	19	24
Plays–yards	65–367	57–464
Rushes–yards	24–74	28–132
Passing yards	293	332
Passing: comp–att–int	30–38–0	24–28–0
Turnovers	0	0
Time of possession	31:14	28:46

Team	Category	Player	Statistics
Michigan State	Passing	Aidan Chiles	27/33, 243 yards, TD
Michigan State	Rushing	Aidan Chiles	8 carries, 48 yards
Michigan State	Receiving	Nick Marsh	7 receptions, 64 yards, TD
Indiana	Passing	Fernando Mendoza	24/28, 332 yards, 4 TD
Indiana	Rushing	Kaelon Black	10 carries, 64 yards, TD
Indiana	Receiving	Omar Cooper Jr.	8 receptions, 115 yards, TD

=== vs UCLA ===
UCLA Bruins (3–4) at No. 2 Indiana Hoosiers (7–0) – Game summary

Quarter	1	2	3	4	Total
Bruins	0	3	3	0	6
No. 2 Hoosiers	14	21	14	7	56

at Memorial Stadium • Bloomington, Indiana

- Date: October 25
- Game time: 12:00 pm
- Game weather: Sunny
- Game attendance: 54,867
- Referee: Mark Kluczynski
- TV announcers (FOX): Gus Johnson (play-by-play), Joel Klatt (analyst), and Jenny Taft (sideline reporter)

Game information

First quarter

- IU – Aiden Fisher 25-yard interception return (Nico Radicic kick), 14:03. Hoosiers 7–0.
- IU – Roman Hemby 1-yard run (Nico Radicic kick), 4:02. Hoosiers 14–0. Drive: 8 plays, 59 yards, 4:04.

Second quarter

- IU – Elijah Sarratt 1-yard pass from Fernando Mendoza (Nico Radicic kick), 12:30. Hoosiers 21–0. Drive: 11 plays, 75 yards, 4:46.
- IU – Roman Hemby 13-yard run (Nico Radicic kick), 8:44.Hoosiers 28–0. Drive: 3 plays, 29 yards, 1:15.
- UCLA – Mateen Bhaghani 44-yard field goal, 1:55.Hoosiers 28–3. Drive: 7 plays, 36 yards, 3:21.
- IU – E.J. Williams Jr. 2-yard pass from Fernando Mendoza (Nico Radicic kick), 0:13. Hoosiers 35–3. Drive: 8 plays, 75 yards, 1:36.

Third quarter

- IU – Fernando Mendoza 20-yard run (Nico Radicic kick), 9:15. Hoosiers 42–3. Drive: 10 plays, 75 yards, 5:45.
- IU – E.J. Williams Jr. 62-yard pass from Fernando Mendoza (Nico Radicic kick), 4:13. Hoosiers 49–3. Drive: 6 plays, 74 yards, 3:35.
- UCLA – Mateen Bhaghani 30-yard field goal, 0:23. Hoosiers 49–6. Drive: 10 plays, 64 yards, 3:50.

Fourth quarter

- IU – Alberto Mendoza 4-yard run (Nico Radicic kick), 11:11. Hoosiers 56–6. Drive: 10 plays, 75 yards, 4:12.

Statistics	UCLA	IU
First downs	12	27
Plays–yards	53–201	76–475
Rushes–yards	25–88	47–262
Passing yards	113	213
Passing: comp–att–int	13–28–2	19–29–2
Turnovers	3	2
Time of possession	24:26	35:34

Team	Category	Player	Statistics
UCLA	Passing	Nico Iamaleava	13/27, 113 yards, 2 INT
UCLA	Rushing	Nico Iamaleava	7 carries, 46 yards
UCLA	Receiving	Rico Flores Jr.	4 receptions, 50 yards
Indiana	Passing	Fernando Mendoza	15/22, 168 yards, 3 TD, INT
Indiana	Rushing	Roman Hemby	17 carries, 81 yards, 2 TD
Indiana	Receiving	E.J. Williams Jr.	5 receptions, 109 yards, 2 TD

=== at Maryland ===
No. 2 Indiana Hoosiers (8–0) at Maryland Terrapins (4–3) – Game summary

Quarter	1	2	3	4	Total
No. 2 Hoosiers	7	13	21	14	55
Terrapins	3	0	7	0	10

at SECU Stadium • College Park, Maryland

- Date: November 1
- Game time: 3:30 pm
- Game weather: Cloudy
- Game attendance: 46,185
- Referee: Jeff Servinski
- TV announcers (CBS): Brad Nessler (play-by-play), Gary Danielson (analyst), and Jenny Dell (sideline reporter)

Game information

First quarter

- MD – Sean O'Haire 24-yard field goal, 12:01. Terrapins 3–0. Drive: 4 plays, 6 yards, 1:35.
- IU – Fernando Mendoza 1-yard run (Nico Radicic kick), 2:11. Hoosiers 7–3. Drive: 13 plays, 93 yards, 6:42.

Second quarter

- IU – Nico Radicic 20-yard field goal, 10:30. Hoosiers 10–3. Drive: 8 plays, 76 yards, 4:25.
- IU – Omar Cooper Jr. 22-yard pass from Fernando Mendoza (Nico Radicic kick), 4:53. Hoosiers 17–3. Drive: 9 plays, 84 yards, 4:40.
- IU – Nico Radicic 46-yard field goal, 0:40. Hoosiers 20–3. Drive: 10 plays, 43 yards, 2:15.

Third quarter

- MD – DeJuan Williams 55-yard pass from Malik Washington (Sean O'Haire kick), 12:54. Hoosiers 20–10. Drive: 4 plays, 75 yards, 2:06.
- IU – Kaelon Black 31-yard run (Nico Radicic kick), 9:43. Hoosiers 27–10. Drive: 6 plays, 63 yards, 3:07.
- IU – Devan Boykin 32-yard fumble recovery (Nico Radicic kick), 8:41. Hoosiers 34–10.
- IU – Roman Hemby 16-yard run (Nico Radicic kick), 7:37. Hoosiers 41–10. Drive: 2 plays, 24 yards, 0:52.

Fourth quarter

- IU – Jonathan Brady 6-yard pass from Alberto Mendoza (Nico Radicic kick), 11:22. Hoosiers 48–10. Drive: 13 plays, 95 yards, 8:20.
- IU – Khobie Martin 1-yard run (Nico Radicic kick), 3:08. Hoosiers 55–10. Drive: 8 plays, 93 yards, 5:34.

Statistics	IU	MD
First downs	28	11
Plays–yards	75–588	50–293
Rushes–yards	52–367	17–37
Passing yards	221	256
Passing yards comp–att–int	16–23–1	18–33–2
Turnovers	1	5
Time of possession	40:22	19:38

Team	Category	Player	Statistics
Indiana	Passing	Fernando Mendoza	14/21, 201 yards, TD, INT
Indiana	Rushing	Kaelon Black	14 carries, 110 yards, TD
Indiana	Receiving	Omar Cooper Jr.	7 receptions, 86 yards, TD
Maryland	Passing	Malik Washington	16/31, 242 yards, TD, 2 INT
Maryland	Rushing	Iverson Howard	4 carries, 12 yards
Maryland	Receiving	DeJuan Williams	4 receptions, 78 yards, TD

=== at Penn State ===
No. 2 Indiana Hoosiers (9–0) at Penn State Nittany Lions (3–5) – Game summary

Quarter	1	2	3	4	Total
No. 2 Hoosiers	7	10	3	7	27
Nittany Lions	0	7	3	14	24

at Beaver Stadium • University Park, Pennsylvania

- Date: November 8
- Game time: 12:00 p.m.
- Game weather: Mostly Cloudy • Temperature: 55 °F (13 °C)
- Game attendance: 105,231
- Referee: Chris Coyte
- TV announcers (FOX): Gus Johnson (play-by-play), Joel Klatt (analyst), and Jenny Taft (sideline reporter)

Game information

First quarter

- IU – Fernando Mendoza 18-yard run (Nico Radicic kick), 1:42. Hoosiers 7–0. Drive: 3 plays, 68 yards, 1:20.

Second quarter

- PSU – Nicholas Singleton 2-yard run (Ryan Barker kick), 11:08. Tied 7–7. Drive: 10 plays, 67 yards, 5:28.
- IU – Nico Radicic 28-yard field goal, 2:30. Hoosiers 10–7. Drive: 15 plays, 65 yards, 8:38.
- IU – Kaelon Black 1-yard run (Nico Radicic kick), 0:38. Hoosiers 17–7. Drive: 2 plays, 22 yards, 0:31.

Third quarter

- IU – Nico Radicic 31-yard field goal, 8:41. Hoosiers 20–7. Drive: 11 plays, 37 yards, 6:03.
- PSU – Ryan Barker 36-yard field goal, 3:36. Hoosiers 20–10. Drive: 10 plays, 56 yards, 5:05.

Fourth quarter

- PSU – Nicholas Singleton 1-yard run (Ryan Barker kick), 11:36. Hoosiers 20–17. Drive: 5 plays, 85 yards, 3:13.
- PSU – Nicholas Singleton 19-yard pass from Ethan Grunkemeyer (Ryan Barker kick), 6:27. Nittany Lions 24–20. Drive: 7 plays, 44 yards, 4:20.
- IU – Omar Cooper Jr. 13-yard pass from Fernando Mendoza (Nico Radicic kick), 0:36. Hoosiers 27–24. Drive: 10 plays, 80 yards, 1:15.

Statistics	IU	PSU
First downs	20	17
Plays–yards	62–326	64–336
Rushes–yards	31–108	33–117
Passing yards	218	219
Passing: comp–att–int	19–31–1	22–31–1
Turnovers	1	2
Time of possession	30:37	29:23

Team	Category	Player	Statistics
Indiana	Passing	Fernando Mendoza	19/30, 218 yards, TD, INT
Indiana	Rushing	Roman Hemby	12 carries, 55 yards
Indiana	Receiving	Charlie Becker	7 receptions, 118 yards
Penn State	Passing	Ethan Grunkemeyer	22/31, 219 yards, TD, INT
Penn State	Rushing	Nicholas Singleton	10 carries, 71 yards, 2 TD
Penn State	Receiving	Trebor Peña	6 receptions, 99 yards

=== vs Wisconsin ===
Wisconsin Badgers (3–6) at No. 2 Indiana Hoosiers (10–0) – Game summary

Quarter	1	2	3	4	Total
Badgers	0	7	0	0	7
No. 2 Hoosiers	7	3	14	7	31

at Memorial Stadium • Bloomington, Indiana

- Date: November 15
- Game time: 12:00 p.m.
- Game weather: Sunny • Temperature: 69 °F (21 °C) • Wind: S at 15 miles per hour (24 km/h)
- Game attendance: 55,042
- Referee: Jason Nickleby
- TV announcers (BTN): Jeff Levering (play-by-play), Jake Butt (analyst), and Brooke Fletcher (sideline reporter)

Game information

First quarter

- IU – Charlie Becker 31-yard pass from Fernando Mendoza (Nicolas Radicic kick), 2:56 Hoosiers 7–0. Drive: 9 plays, 72 yards, 4:25.

Second quarter

- WIS – Lance Mason 45-yard pass from Carter Smith (Nathanial Vakos kick), 2:56 Tied 7–7. Drive: 8 plays, 79 yards, 4:04.
- IU – Nicolas Radicic 37-yard field goal, 0:55. Hoosiers 10–7. Drive: 9 plays, 56 yards, 2:47.

Third quarter

- IU – Holden Staes 2-yard pass from Fernando Mendoza (Nicolas Radicic kick), 10:19 Hoosiers 17–7. Drive: 9 plays, 75 yards, 4:41.
- IU – Riley Nowakowski 21-yard pass from Fernando Mendoza (Nicolas Radicic kick), 4:44 Hoosiers 24–7. Drive: 1 play, 21 yards, 0:08.

Fourth quarter

- IU – Omar Cooper 5-yard pass from Fernando Mendoza (Nicolas Radicic kick), 5:21 Hoosiers 31–7. Drive: 7 plays, 48 yards, 4:41.

Statistics	WIS	IU
First downs	8	19
Plays–yards	45–168	62–388
Rushes–yards	30–70	37–83
Passing yards	98	305
Passing: comp–att–int	9–15–1	23–25–0
Turnovers	2	0
Time of possession	26:02	33:58

Team	Category	Player	Statistics
Wisconsin	Passing	Carter Smith	9/15, 98 yards, TD, INT
Wisconsin	Rushing	Gideon Ituka	9 carries, 32 yards
Wisconsin	Receiving	Lance Mason	1 reception, 45 yards, TD
Indiana	Passing	Fernando Mendoza	22/24, 299 yards, 4 TD
Indiana	Rushing	Roman Hemby	14 carries, 58 yards
Indiana	Receiving	Charlie Becker	5 receptions, 108 yards, TD

=== at Purdue (Old Oaken Bucket) ===
No. 2 Indiana Hoosiers (11–0) at Purdue Boilermakers (2–9) – Game summary

Quarter	1	2	3	4	Total
No. 2 Hoosiers	7	21	21	7	56
Boilermakers	3	0	0	0	3

at Ross–Ade Stadium • West Lafayette, Indiana

- Date: November 28
- Game time: 7:30 p.m.
- Game weather: Clear • Temperature: 24 °F (−4 °C) • Wind: E at 0 miles per hour (0 km/h)
- Game attendance: 59,807
- Referee: Mark Kluczynski
- TV announcers (NBC): Paul Burmeister (play-by-play), Yogi Roth (analyst), and Zora Stephenson (sideline)

Game information

First quarter

- IU – Kaelon Black 1-yard run (Nicolas Radicic kick), 8:03. Hoosiers 7–0. Drive: 5 plays, 40 yards, 1:47.
- PUR – Spencer Porath 22-yard field goal, 00:46. Hoosiers 7–3. Drive: 11 plays, 67 yards, 5:42.

Second quarter

- IU – Fernando Mendoza 7-yard run (Nicolas Radicic kick), 10:29. Hoosiers 14–3. Drive: 11 plays, 65 yards, 5:17.
- IU – Kaelon Black 16-yard run (Nicolas Radicic kick), 3:40. Hoosiers 21–3. Drive: 2 plays, 36 yards, 00:45.
- IU – Roman Hemby 82-yard run (Nicolas Radicic kick), 1:33. Hoosiers 28–3. Drive: 2 plays, 82 yards, 00:18.

Third quarter

- IU – Elijah Sarratt 17-yard pass from Fernando Mendoza (Nicolas Radicic kick), 7:37. Hoosiers 35–3. Drive: 11 plays, 89 yards, 7:17.
- IU – Omar Cooper Jr. 43-yard pass from Fernando Mendoza (Nicolas Radicic kick), 3:52. Hoosiers 42–3. Drive: 2 plays, 42 yards, 00:47.
- IU – Khobie Martin 21-yard run (Nicolas Radicic kick), 0:00. Hoosiers 49–3. Drive: 2 plays, 79 yards, 00:46.

Fourth quarter

- IU – Davion Chandler 65-yard pass from Alberto Mendoza (Nicolas Radicic kick), 9:29. Hoosiers 56–3. Drive: 4 plays, 85 yards, 2:06.

Statistics	IU	PUR
First downs	22	16
Plays–yards	54–548	74–242
Rushes–yards	37–355	27–44
Passing yards	193	238
Passing: comp–att–int	10–17–0	25–47–1
Turnovers	0	2
Time of possession	26:52	33:08

Team	Category	Player	Statistics
Indiana	Passing	Fernando Mendoza	8/15, 117 yards, 2 TD
Indiana	Rushing	Roman Hemby	12 carries, 152 yards, 2 TD
Indiana	Receiving	Davion Chandler	1 reception, 65 yards, TD
Purdue	Passing	Ryan Browne	25/47, 238 yards, INT
Purdue	Rushing	Antonio Harris	15 carries, 31 yards
Purdue	Receiving	Nitro Tuggle	5 receptions, 80 yards

=== vs No. 1 Ohio State (Big Ten Championship Game) ===
2025 Big Ten Championship Game
No. 2 Indiana Hoosiers (12–0) vs No. 1 Ohio State Buckeyes (12–0) – Game summary

Quarter	1	2	3	4	Total
No. 2 Hoosiers	3	3	7	0	13
No. 1 Buckeyes	7	3	0	0	10

at Lucas Oil Stadium • Indianapolis, Indiana

- Date: December 6
- Game time: 8:00 p.m.
- Game weather: None (indoors)
- Game attendance: 68,214
- Referee: Ron Snodgrass
- TV announcers (FOX): Gus Johnson (play-by-play), Joel Klatt (analyst), Jenny Taft, and Tom Rinaldi (sideline reporters)

Game information

First quarter

- IU – Nicolas Radicic 29-yard field goal, 6:55. Hoosiers 3–0. Drive: 6 plays, 12 yards, 2:02.
- OSU – Carnell Tate 9-yard pass from Julian Sayin (Jayden Fielding kick), 0:53. Buckeyes 7–3. Drive: 5 plays, 25 yards, 0:55.

Second quarter

- OSU – Jayden Fielding 30-yard field goal, 10:12. Buckeyes 10–3. Drive: 6 plays, 67 yards, 3:23.
- IU – Nicolas Radicic 32-yard field goal, 2:50. Buckeyes 10–6. Drive: 15 plays, 61 yards, 7:18.

Third quarter

- IU – Elijah Sarratt 17-yard pass from Fernando Mendoza (Nicolas Radicic kick), 8:07. Hoosiers 13–10. Drive: 7 plays, 88 yards, 3:30.

Fourth quarter

- No scoring plays.

Statistics	IU	OSU
First downs	17	17
Plays–yards	57–340	56–322
Rushes–yards	34–118	26–58
Passing yards	222	264
Passing: comp–att–int	15–23–1	22–30–1
Turnovers	1	1
Time of possession	29:47	30:13

Team	Category	Player	Statistics
Indiana	Passing	Fernando Mendoza	15/23, 222 yards, TD, INT
Indiana	Rushing	Kaelon Black	16 carries, 69 yards
Indiana	Receiving	Charlie Becker	6 receptions, 126 yards
Ohio State	Passing	Julian Sayin	21/29, 258 yards, TD, INT
Ohio State	Rushing	Bo Jackson	17 carries, 83 yards
Ohio State	Receiving	Jeremiah Smith	8 receptions, 144 yards

=== vs. No. 9 Alabama (Rose Bowl - CFP Quarterfinal) ===
CFP Quarterfinal at the Rose Bowl Presented by Prudential
No. 9 Alabama Crimson Tide (11–3) vs. No. 1 Indiana Hoosiers (13–0) – Game summary

Quarter	1	2	3	4	Total
No. 9 Crimson Tide	0	0	3	0	3
No. 1 Hoosiers	0	17	7	14	38

at Rose Bowl • Pasadena, CA

- Date: January 1, 2026
- Game time: 3:00 pm CST
- Game attendance: 90,278
- Referee: Kevin Mar (Big 12)
- TV announcers (ESPN): Chris Fowler (play-by-play), Kirk Herbstreit (analyst), Holly Rowe and Kris Budden (sideline reporters)

Game information

First quarter

- No scoring plays.

Second quarter

- IU – Nicolas Radicic 31-yard field goal, 14:57. Hoosiers 3–0. Drive: 16 plays, 84 yards, 8:55.
- IU – Charlie Becker 21-yard pass from Fernando Mendoza (Nico Radicic kick), 10:49. Hoosiers 10–0. Drive: 4 plays, 34 yards, 1:47.
- IU – Omar Cooper Jr. 1-yard pass from Fernando Mendoza (Nico Radicic kick), 0:17. Hoosiers 17–0. Drive: 11 plays, 58 yards, 2:52.

Third Quarter

- IU – Elijah Sarratt 24-yard pass from Fernando Mendoza (Nico Radicic kick), 7:46. Hoosiers 24–0. Drive: 10 plays, 79 yards, 5:40.
- BAMA – Conor Talty 28-yard field goal, 2:44. Hoosiers 24–3. Drive: 9 plays, 65 yards, 5:02.

Fourth quarter

- IU – Kaelon Black 25-yard run (Nico Radicic kick), 14:21. Hoosiers 31–3. Drive: 6 plays, 75 yards, 3:23.
- IU – Roman Hemby 18-yard run (Nico Radicic kick), 10:33. Hoosiers 38–3. Drive: 5 plays, 63 yards, 2:44.

Statistics	ALA	IU
First downs	11	22
Plays–yards	50–193	66–407
Rushes–yards	17–23	50–215
Passing yards	170	192
Passing: Comp–Att–Int	24-33-0	14-16-0
Turnovers	1	0
Time of possession	25:39	34:21

Team	Category	Player	Statistics
Alabama	Passing	Austin Mack	11/16, 103 yards
Alabama	Rushing	Ty Simpson	3 carries, 17 yards
Alabama	Receiving	Germie Bernard	4 receptions, 60 yards
Indiana	Passing	Fernando Mendoza	14/16, 192 yards, 3 TD
Indiana	Rushing	Kaelon Black	15 carries, 99 yards, TD
Indiana	Receiving	Charlie Becker	2 receptions, 51 yards, TD

=== vs. No. 5 Oregon (Peach Bowl - CFP Semifinal) ===
CFP Semifinal at the Chick-fil-A Peach Bowl
No. 5 Oregon Ducks (13–1) vs. No. 1 Indiana Hoosiers (14–0) – Game summary

Quarter	1	2	3	4	Total
No. 5 Ducks	7	0	8	7	22
No. 1 Hoosiers	14	21	7	14	56

at Mercedes-Benz Stadium • Atlanta, GA

- Date: January 9, 2026
- Game time: 6:30 pm CST
- Game attendance: 75,604
- Referee: Daniel Gautreaux (SEC)
- TV announcers (ESPN): Sean McDonough (play-by-play), Greg McElroy (analyst), Molly McGrath, Katie George (sideline reporters) and Matt Austin (rules expert)

Game information

First quarter

- IU – D'Angelo Ponds 25-yard interception return (Nico Radicic kick), 14:49. Hoosiers 7–0. Drive: 1 play, 0 yards, 0:08.
- ORE – Jamari Johnson 19-yard pass from Dante Moore (Atticus Sappington kick), 7:11. Tied 7–7. Drive: 14 plays, 75 yards, 7:38.
- IU – Omar Cooper Jr. 8-yard pass from Fernando Mendoza (Nico Radicic kick), 0:40. Hoosiers 14–7. Drive: 4 plays, 34 yards, 1:47.

Second quarter

- IU – Kaelon Black 1-yard run (Nico Radicic kick), 8:17. Hoosiers 21–7. Drive: 3 plays, 3 yards, 1:12.
- IU – Charlie Becker 36-yard pass from Fernando Mendoza (Nico Radicic kick), 3:13. Hoosiers 28–7. Drive: 4 plays, 61 yards, 1:44.
- IU – Elijah Sarratt 2-yard pass from Fernando Mendoza (Nico Radicic kick), 0:59. Hoosiers 35–7. Drive: 6 plays, 19 yards, 1:37.

Third Quarter

- IU – E.J. Williams Jr. 13-yard pass from Fernando Mendoza (Nico Radicic kick), 8:52. Hoosiers 42–7. Drive: 11 plays, 75 yards, 6:08.
- ORE – Jay Harris 2-yard run (Dante Moore pass to Jamari Johnson), 7:50. Hoosiers 42–15. Drive: 2 plays, 75 yards, 1:02.

Fourth quarter

- IU – Elijah Sarratt 3-yard pass from Fernando Mendoza (Nico Radicic kick), 11:36. Hoosiers 49–15. Drive: 3 plays, 4 yards, 1:28.
- IU – Kaelon Black 23-yard run (Nico Radicic kick), 5:13. Hoosiers 56–15. Drive: 5 plays, 65 yards, 3:07.
- ORE – Roger Saleapaga 1-yard pass from Dante Moore (Atticus Sappington kick), 0:22. Hoosiers 56–22. Drive: 12 plays, 75 yards, 4:51.

Statistics	ORE	IU
First downs	20	18
Plays–yards	66–378	60–362
Rushing yards	93	185
Passing yards	285	177
Passing: Comp–Att–Int	24-40-1	17-20-0
Turnovers	3	0
Time of possession	28:47	31:13

Team	Category	Player	Statistics
Oregon	Passing	Dante Moore	24/39, 285 yards, 2 TD, INT
Oregon	Rushing	Dierre Hill Jr.	5 carries, 86 yards
Oregon	Receiving	Jamari Johnson	4 receptions, 83 yards, TD
Indiana	Passing	Fernando Mendoza	17/20, 177 yards, 5 TD
Indiana	Rushing	Kaelon Black	12 carries, 63 yards, 2 TD
Indiana	Receiving	Elijah Sarratt	7 receptions, 75 yards, 2 TD

=== vs. No. 10 Miami (FL) (CFP National Championship Game) ===
2026 College Football Playoff National Championship
No. 10 Miami Hurricanes (13–2) vs. No. 1 Indiana Hoosiers (15–0) – Game summary

Quarter	1	2	3	4	Total
No. 10 Hurricanes	0	0	7	14	21
No. 1 Hoosiers	3	7	7	10	27

at Hard Rock Stadium • Miami Gardens, FL

- Date: January 19, 2026
- Game time: 6:30 pm CST
- Game weather: Cloudy
- Game attendance: 67,227
- Referee: Michael VanderVelde (Big 12)
- TV announcers (ESPN): Chris Fowler (play-by-play), Kirk Herbstreit (analyst), Holly Rowe, and Molly McGrath (sideline reporters)

Game information

First quarter

- IU – Nico Radicic 34-yard field goal, 2:42. Hoosiers 3–0. Drive: 12 plays, 55 yards, 5:56.

Second quarter

- IU – Riley Nowakowski 1-yard run (Nico Radicic kick), 6:13. Hoosiers 10–0. Drive: 14 plays, 85 yards, 6:28.

Third quarter

- MIA – Mark Fletcher Jr. 57-yard run (Carter Davis kick), 11:06. Hoosiers 10–7. Drive: 2 plays, 62 yards, 0:46.
- IU – Isaiah Jones blocked punt recovery (Nico Radicic kick), 5:04. Hoosiers 17–7.

Fourth quarter

- MIA – Mark Fletcher Jr. 3-yard run (Carter Davis kick), 14:57. Hoosiers 17–14. Drive: 10 plays, 81 yards, 5:07.
- IU – Fernando Mendoza 12-yard run (Nico Radicic kick), 9:18. Hoosiers 24–14. Drive: 12 plays, 75 yards, 5:39.
- MIA – Malachi Toney 22-yard pass from Carson Beck (Carter Davis kick), 6:37. Hoosiers 24–21. Drive: 8 plays, 91 yards, 2:34.
- IU – Nico Radicic 35-yard field goal, 1:42. Hoosiers 27–21. Drive: 11 plays, 57 yards, 4:55.

Statistics	MIA	IU
First downs	15	20
Plays–yards	53–342	72–317
Rushes–yards	21–110	45–131
Passing yards	232	186
Passing: Comp–Att–Int	19–32–1	16–27–0
Turnovers	1	0
Time of possession	23:36	36:24

Team	Category	Player	Statistics
Miami	Passing	Carson Beck	19/32, 232 yards, TD, INT
Miami	Rushing	Mark Fletcher Jr.	17 carries, 112 yards
Miami	Receiving	Malachi Toney	10 receptions, 122 yards, TD
Indiana	Passing	Fernando Mendoza	16/27, 186 yards
Indiana	Rushing	Kaelon Black	17 carries, 79 yards
Indiana	Receiving	Omar Cooper Jr.	5 receptions, 71 yards

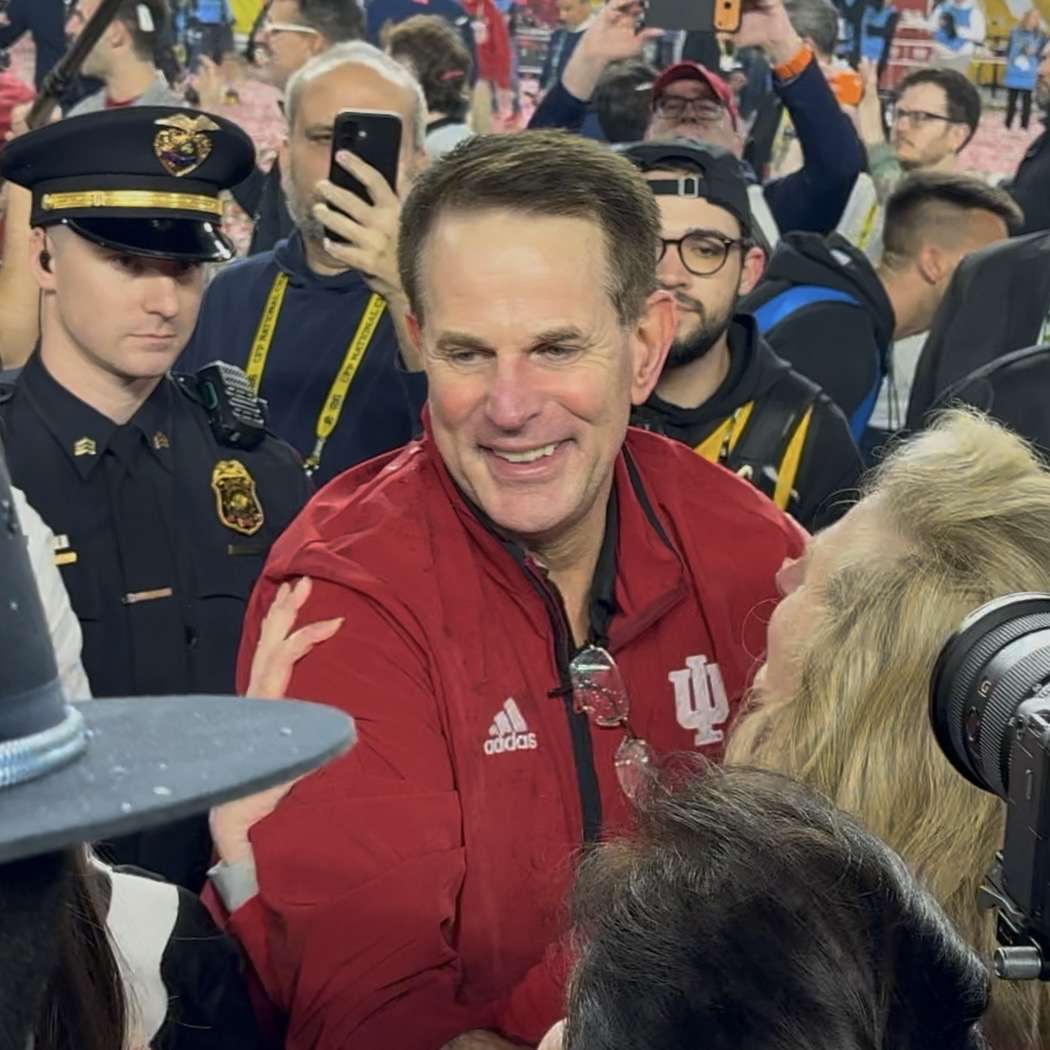
Curt Cignetti celebrates with family immediately after the game.

Indiana players, fans, and coaches celebrate on the field immediately after the game.

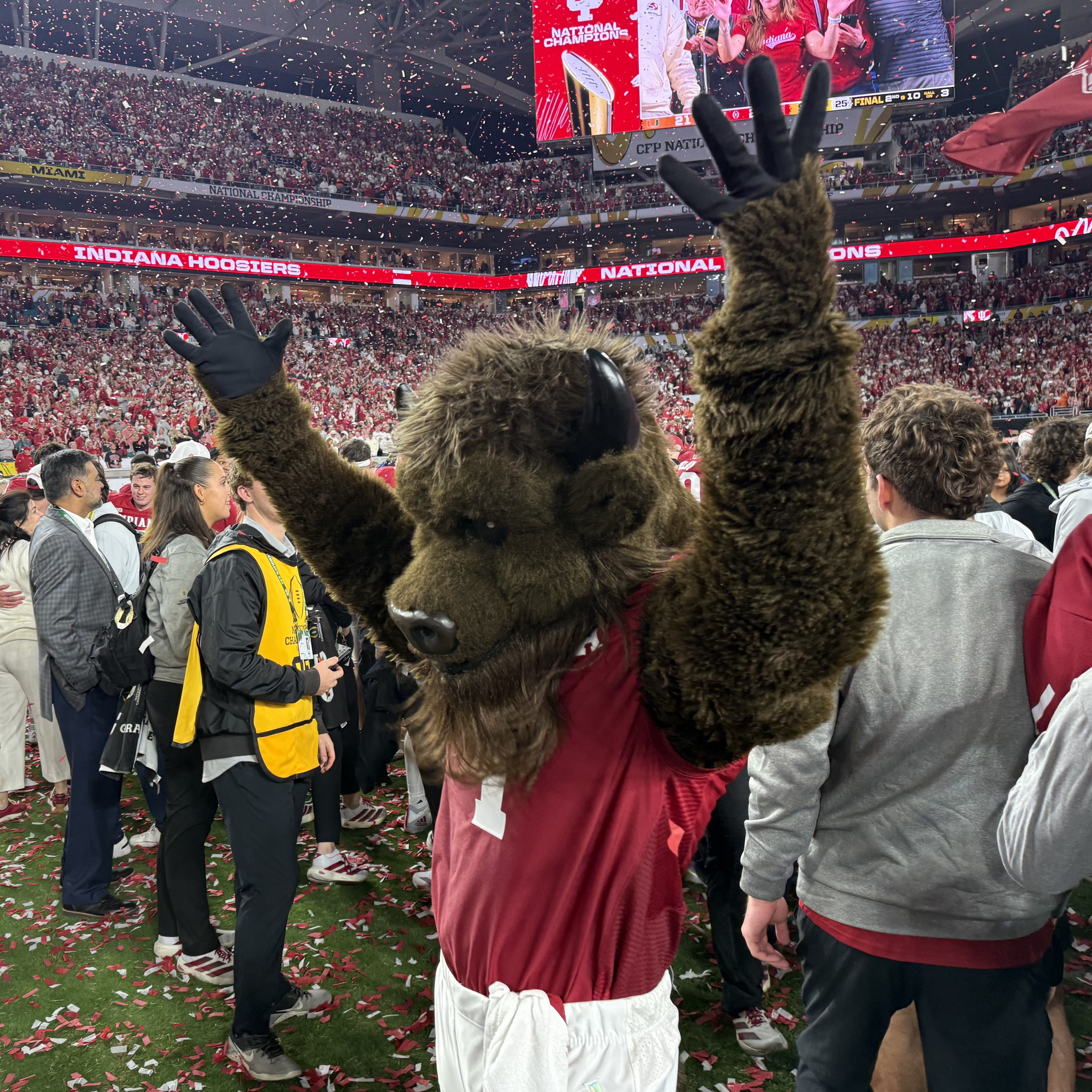
Indiana mascot Hoosier the Bison celebrates on the field.

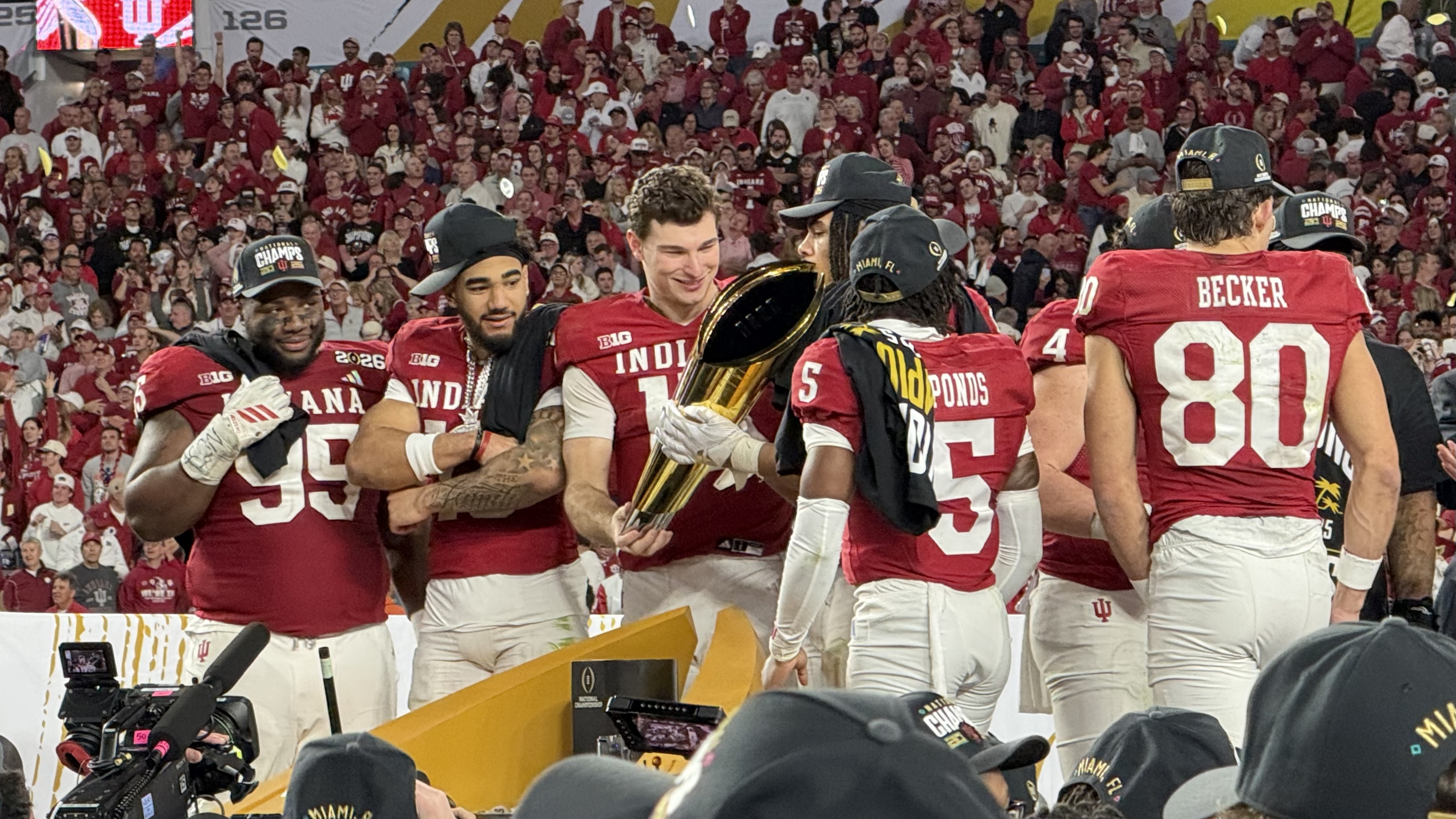
Fernando Mendoza looks happily at the CFP Trophy as his teammates look on.

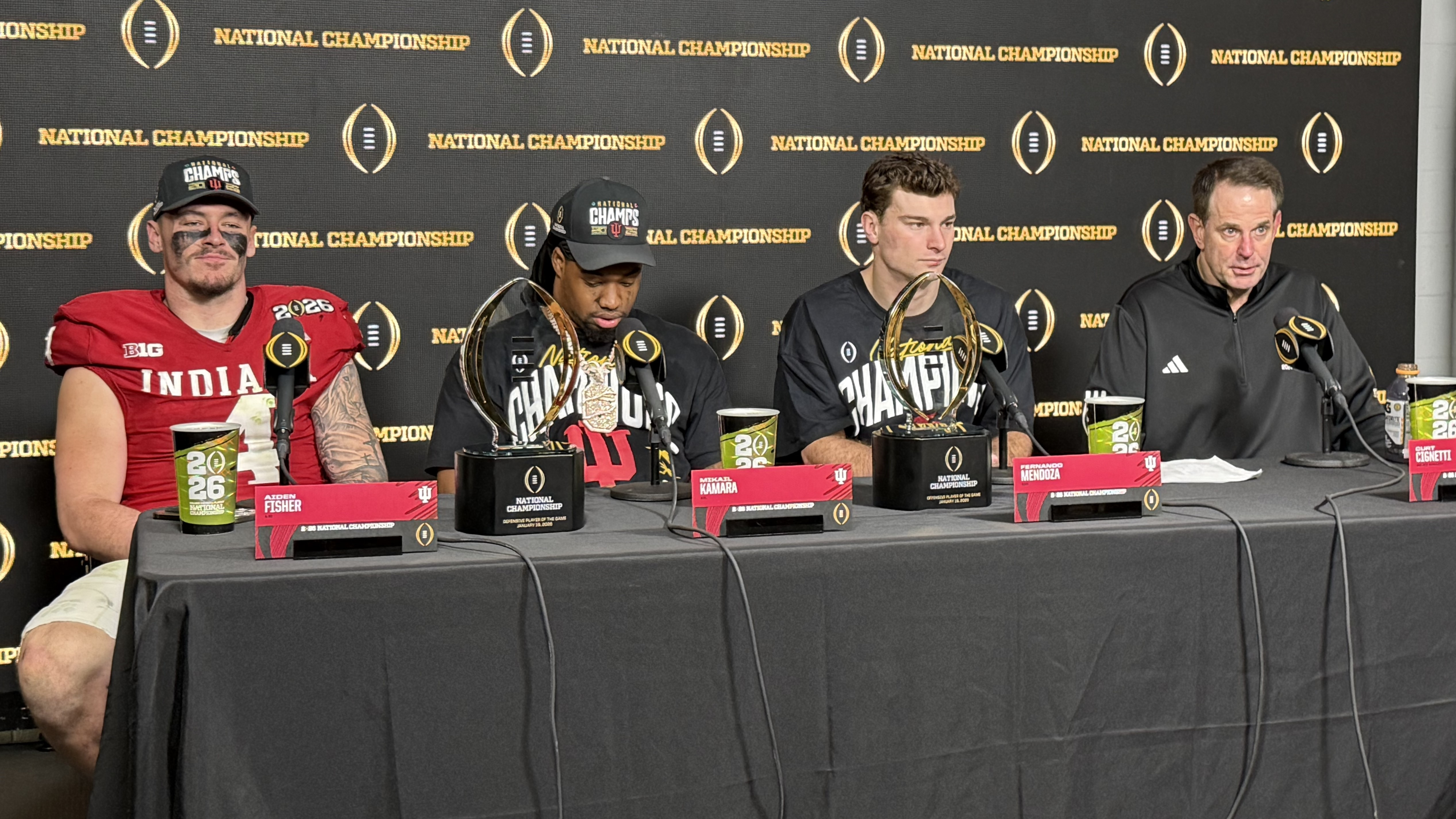
Indiana post-game press conference with Aiden Fisher, Mikail Kamara (defensive MVP), Fernando Mendoza (offensive MVP), and Curt Cignetti.
All photos from stadium after the game, in rough chronological order.

== Personnel ==
=== Roster ===
2025 Indiana Hoosiers football team roster
Players
Coaches
Offense

Pos.	#	Name	Class
WR	0	Jonathan Brady	Sr
RB	1	Roman Hemby	RSr
WR	3	Omar Cooper Jr.	RJr
WR	4	Davion Chandler	Fr
QB	5	Grant Wilson	RSr
WR	6	LeBron Bond	Fr
WR	7	E.J. Williams Jr.	RSr
RB	8	Kaelon Black	RSr
WR	9	Tyler Morris	Sr
QB	12	Jacob Bell	Fr
WR	13	Elijah Sarratt	Sr
QB	14	Maverick Geske	Fr
QB	15	Fernando Mendoza	RJr
QB	16	Alberto Mendoza	RFr
WR	17	Jackson Wasserstrom	RJr
RB	18	Solomon Vanhorse	GS
TE	19	Holden Staes	Sr
RB	20	Sean Cuono	Fr
WR	21	Ace Ciongoli	Fr
WR	26	Cade Kaiser	Fr
RB	28	Khobie Martin	RFr
RB	29	Lee Beebe Jr.	RJr
RB	30	Kyler Kropp	RFr
TE	37	Riley Nowakowski	GS
TE	48	James Bomba	RSr
OL	54	Jack Greer	RJr
OL	56	Chance Johnson	Fr
OL	61	Baylor Wilkin	Fr
OL	62	Drew Evans	RJr
OL	63	Mitch Verstegen	RFr
OL	65	Carter Smith	RJr
OL	66	Evan Parker	Fr
OL	67	Kahlil Benson	RSr
OL	70	Austin Leibfried	RFr
OL	71	Evan Lawrence	RFr
OL	72	Adedamola Ajani	RFr
OL	74	Bray Lynch	RJr
OL	75	Zen Michalski	RSr
OL	77	Matt Marek	Fr
OL	78	Pat Coogan	RSr
WR	80	Charlie Becker	So
WR	82	Myles Kendrick	Fr
WR	83	Hunter Stroud	Fr
TE	84	Blake Thiry	Fr
TE	85	Andrew Barker	Fr
WR	86	Bruno Massel IV	Fr
WR	89	Camden Jordan	RSr

Defense

Pos.	#	Name	Class
DL	0	Hosea Wheeler	RSr
DB	1	Amare Ferrell	Jr
DB	2	Byron Baldwin	Fr
DB	3	Jaylen Bell	Fr
LB	4	Aiden Fisher	Sr
DB	5	D'Angelo Ponds	Jr
DL	6	Mikail Kamara	RSr
DB	7	Louis Moore	GS
DL	8	Stephen Daley	Sr
DB	9	Seaonta Stewart Jr.	Fr
DB	10	Ryland Gandy	RJr
DB	12	Devan Boykin	GS
DL	13	Kellan Wyatt	Sr
LB	14	Kaiden Turner	RJr
DB	16	Jah Jah Boyd	RFr
DL	17	Daniel Ndukwe	So
DL	18	Andrew Turvy	RSr
DB	19	Zacharey Smith	Fr
DB	20	Dontrae Henderson	RFr
LB	21	Rolijah Hardy	So
DB	22	Jamari Sharpe	RJr
DB	23	Amariyun Knighten	Jr
DB	24	Bryson Bonds	RSr
DB	27	Reece Bellin	RSo
DL	30	Paul Nelson	Fr
DB	31	Anthony Chung	RSo
DB	33	Garrett Reese	Fr
LB	34	Jeff Utzinger	RJr
DB	36	Clay Conner	RSo
DB	37	Heath Kizer	RFr
LB	38	Kaden McConnell	RFr
DL	40	Quentin Clark	RFr
DL	41	Keishaun Calhoun	Fr
DL	42	Andrew Depaepe	RSo
LB	44	Amari Kamara	Fr
DB	45	Lincoln Murff	RSo
LB	46	Isaiah Jones	RJr
DL	47	Finn Walters	RSo
DL	50	Jhrevious Hall	Fr
LB	52	Clayton Allen	RSo
DL	58	Aden Cannon	RJr
DL	90	J'Mari Monette	RJr
DL	91	Dominique Ratcliff	RSr
DL	94	Kyler Garcia	Fr
DL	95	Tyrique Tucker	RJr
DL	96	Triston Abram	Fr
DL	97	Mario Landino	So
DL	98	William Depaepe	RFr
DL	99	Tyrone Burrus Jr.	Fr

Special teams

Pos.	#	Name	Class
K	15	Nico Radicic	RSo
K	35	Brendan Franke	RSr
K	43	Bryce Taylor	Fr
P	44	Mitch McCarthy	Sr
LS	45	Sam Lindsey	RSo
LS	47	Mark Langston	RSr
K/P	49	Oludabe Baker	RSr
K	90	Josh Placzek	RFr
K	93	Quinn Warren	So

Head coach

- Curt Cignetti

Coordinators/assistant coaches

- Bryant Haines (Defensive coordinator/linebackers)
- Mike Shanahan (Offensive coordinator/wide receivers)
- Grant Cain (Special teams coordinator/tight ends)
- Ola Adams (Defensive backs/safeties)
- Bob Bostad (Run game coordinator/offensive line)
- Pat Kuntz (Defensive tackles)
- John Miller (Running backs)
- Rod Ojong (Cornerbacks)
- Chandler Whitmer (Co-offensive coordinator/quarterbacks)
- Buddha Williams (Defensive ends)
- Derek Owings (Director of football performance)

Legend

- (C) Team captain
- (S) Suspended
- (I) Ineligible
- Injured
- Redshirt

Roster
Last update: 4 August 2025

=== Depth chart ===
Defense

NB
12 Devan Boykin
2 Byron Baldwin
⋅

FS
1 Amare Ferrell
31 Anthony Chung
⋅

WLB	MLB
21 Rolijah Hardy	4 Aiden Fisher
46 Isaiah Jones	14 Kaiden Turner
⋅	29 Jeff Utzinger

SS
7 Louis Moore
16 Jah Jah Boyd
⋅

CB
22 Jamari Sharpe
3 Jaylen Bell
⋅

DE	DT	DT	DE
17 Daniel Ndukwe	97 Mario Landino	95 Tyrique Tucker	6 Mikail Kamara
18 Andrew Turvy	91 Dominique Ratcliff	0 Hosea Wheeler	42 Andrew Depaepe
⋅	⋅	⋅	⋅

CB
5 D'Angelo Ponds
10 Ryland Gandy
⋅

Offense

WR
13 Elijah Sarratt
6 LeBron Bond
⋅

WR
3 Omar Cooper
0 Jonathan Brady
⋅

LT	LG	C	RG	RT
65 Carter Smith	62 Drew Evans	78 Pat Coogan	74 Bray Lynch	72 Adedamola Ajani
71 Evan Lawrence	61 Baylor Wilkin	70 Austin Leibfried	77 Matt Marek	67 Kahlil Benson
⋅	⋅	⋅	⋅	75 Zen Michalski

TE
37 Riley Nowakowski
19 Holden Staes
48 James Bomba

WR
7 E.J. Williams Jr.
80 Charlie Becker
⋅

QB
15 Fernando Mendoza
16 Alberto Mendoza
5 Grant Wilson

Key reserves
Out (season)
RB 29 Lee Beebe Jr. (injured)
WR 9 Tyler Morris (injured)
DB 24 Bryson Bonds (injured)
DL 8 Stephen Daley (injured)
DL 13 Kellan Wyatt (injured)

Special teams
PK 15 Nico Radicic
P 44 Mitch McCarthy
KR 1 Roman Hemby
PR 0 Jonathan Brady
LS 47 Mark Langston
H 44 Mitch McCarthy

RB
1 Roman Hemby
8 Kaelon Black
28 Khobie Martin
18 Solomon Vanhorse

== Statistics ==
=== Individual leaders ===
==== Offense ====
Passing statistics
#	NAME	POS	CMP	ATT	PCT	YDS	AVG/G	CMP%	TD	INT	LONG
15	Fernando Mendoza	QB	273	379	72.0	3,535	220.9	72.0	41	5	62
16	Alberto Mendoza	QB	18	24	75.0	286	31.8	75.0	5	1	65
5	Grant Wilson	QB	1	1	100.0	5	1.7	0	0	0	5
	TOTALS		292	406	71.9	3,826	239.1	71.9	46	6	65
	OPPONENTS		302	487	62.0	3,021	188.8	62.0	10	19	59

Rushing statistics
#	NAME	POS	ATT	YDS	AVG	LNG	TD
1	Roman Hemby	RB	230	1,120	4.9	82	7
8	Kaelon Black	RB	187	1,039	5.6	40	10
28	Khobie Martin	RB	69	453	6.6	36	6
15	Fernando Mendoza	QB	64	243	3.8	20	6
29	Lee Beebe Jr.	RB	27	209	7.7	24	1
16	Alberto Mendoza	QB	11	184	16.7	58	1
3	Omar Cooper Jr.	WR	3	74	24.7	75	1
18	Solomon Vanhorse	RB	9	48	5.3	12	0
20	Sean Cuono	QB	2	17	8.5	9	0
2	Grant Wilson	QB	1	6	6.0	6	0
37	Riley Nowakowski	TE	1	1	1.0	1	0
78	Pat Coogan	OL	0	0	0	1	0
	TOTALS		490	2,757	5.6	82	29
	OPPONENTS		323	951	2.9	78	5

Receiving statistics
#	NAME	POS	REC	YDS	AVG	LNG	TD
3	Omar Cooper Jr.	WR	58	804	13.9	58	11
13	Elijah Sarratt	WR	48	650	13.5	49	11
7	E.J. Williams Jr.	WR	33	404	12.2	62	5
80	Charlie Becker	WR	20	389	19.5	53	2
37	Riley Nowakowski	TE	23	296	12.9	43	2
1	Roman Hemby	RB	13	153	11.8	26	0
0	Jonathan Brady	WR	12	95	7.9	16	3
4	Davion Chandler	WR	1	65	65.0	65	1
19	Holden Staes	TE	7	62	8.9	18	2
6	LeBron Bond	WR	5	49	9.8	14	0
8	Kaelon Black	RB	3	25	8.3	10	0
17	Jackson Wasserstrom	WR	2	21	10.5	17	0
2	Makai Jackson	WR	3	15	5.0	6	0
28	Khobie Martin	RB	1	14	14.0	14	0
29	Lee Beebe Jr.	RB	1	7	7.0	7	0
	TOTALS		230	3,049	13.3	65	37
	OPPONENTS		213	2,070	9.7	59	6

==== Defense ====
Defense statistics
#	NAME	POS	SOLO	AST	TOT	TFL-YDS	SACK-YDS	INT	BU	QBH	FR	FF
21	Rolijah Hardy	LB	48	54	102	15.0–52	8.0–41	0	5	4	0	0
4	Aiden Fisher	LB	46	51	97	10.5–35	4.5–25	2	1	5	1	1
7	Louis Moore	DB	45	43	88	2.5–3	0–0	6	3	0	0	0
46	Isaiah Jones	LB	38	40	78	15.5–61	7.0–42	1	3	3	1	1
5	D'Angelo Ponds	DB	44	17	61	4.0–9	0–0	2	10	0	0	1
12	Devan Boykin	DB	37	22	59	6.0–22	1.0–8	2	5	4	2	1
22	Jamari Sharpe	DB	37	13	50	6.0–12	0–0	1	6	0	1	4
1	Amare Ferrell	DB	26	22	48	2.0–6	0–0	4	6	0	0	0
95	Tyrique Tucker	DL	16	24	40	12.0–41	6.0–30	0	2	3	0	0
8	Stephen Daley	DL	26	12	38	19.0–85	5.5–46	0	1	5	0	2
6	Mikail Kamara	DL	10	24	34	7.0–26	2.0–14	0	1	4	0	0
97	Mario Landino	DL	14	18	32	6.0–36	5.0–34	0	3	2	2	0
0	Hosea Wheeler	DL	11	20	31	4.0–7	0–0	0	0	2	2	0
13	Kellan Wyatt	DL	12	15	27	8.0–25	2.5–16	0	1	2	0	0
34	Jeff Utzinger	LB	4	12	16	0–0	0–0	0	5	4	0	0
17	Daniel Ndukwe	DL	7	6	13	3.0–16	2.0–15	0	0	0	0	1
91	Dominique Ratcliff	DL	8	5	13	5.0–20	1.5–12	0	0	0	0	0
10	Ryland Gandy	DB	11	1	12	1.0–2	0–0	0	0	0	0	0
2	Byron Baldwin	DB	5	5	10	0–0	0–0	0	0	1	1	0
14	Kaiden Turner	LB	4	6	10	0.5–0	0–0	1	0	0	9	0
16	Jah Jah Boyd	DB	7	1	8	0–0	0–0	0	0	0	0	1
80	Charlie Becker	WR	5	2	7	0–0	0–0	0	0	0	0	0
31	Anthony Chung	DB	4	2	6	0–0	0–0	0	3	0	0	0
3	Jaylen Bell	DB	4	1	5	0–0	0–0	0	0	0	0	0
40	Quentin Clark	DL	3	2	5	0–0	0–0	0	0	0	0	0
18	Andrew Turvy	DL	1	4	5	0.5–0	0–0	0	0	0	0	0
36	Clay Conner	DB	1	3	4	0–0	0–0	0	0	0	0	0
90	J'Mari Monette	DL	1	2	3	0–0	0–0	0	0	0	0	0
42	Andrew Depaepe	DL	0	2	2	0.5–1	0–0	0	0	0	0	0
98	William Depaepe	DL	1	1	2	1.0–6	1.0–6	0	0	0	0	0
99	Tyrone Burrus Jr.	DL	4	1	5	0–0	0–0	0	0	0	0	0
78	Pat Coogan	OL	1	0	1	0–0	0–0	0	0	0	0	0
23	Amariyun Knighten	DB	0	1	1	0–0	0–0	0	0	0	0	0
47	Mark Langston	LS	1	0	1	0–0	0–0	0	0	0	0	0
15	Fernando Mendoza	QB	1	0	1	0–0	0–0	0	0	0	0	0
30	Paul Nelson	DL	0	1	1	0–0	0–0	0	0	0	0	0
37	Riley Nowakowski	TE	1	0	1	0–0	0–0	0	0	0	0	0
33	Garrett Reese	DB	1	0	1	0–0	0–0	0	0	0	1	0
65	Carter Smith	OL	1	0	1	0–0	0–0	0	0	0	0	0
18	Solomon Vanhorse	RB	0	1	1	0–0	0–0	0	0	0	0	0
	TOTAL		482	434	916.0	129.0–465	46.0–289	19	50	35	12	11
	OPPONENTS		603	500	1103	66.0–282	25.0–164	7	42	32	8	1

Key: POS: Position, SOLO: Solo Tackles, AST: Assisted Tackles, TOT: Total Tackles, TFL: Tackles-for-loss, SACK: Quarterback Sacks, INT: Interceptions, BU: Passes Broken Up, PD: Passes Defended, QBH: Quarterback Hits, FR: Fumbles Recovered, FF: Forced Fumbles

==== Special teams ====
Kicking statistics
#	NAME	POS	XPM	XPA	XP%	FGM	FGA	FG%	LNG
15	Nico Radicic	K	70	70	100	13	13	100	46
35	Brendan Franke	K	0	0	100	1	2	50.0	58
	TOTALS		70	70	100	14	15	93.3	58
	OPPONENTS		12	12	100	15	20	75.0	54

Punting statistics
#	NAME	POS	PUNTS	YDS	AVG	LNG	BLK	TB	I–20
44	Mitch McCarthy	P	24	968	40.3	52	0	0	7
93	Quinn Warren	K	6	288	48	57	0	0	3
	TOTALS		30	1,256	41.9	57	0	0	10
	OPPONENTS		50	2,213	44.3	63	2	4	15

Kick return statistics
#	NAME	POS	RET	YDS	AVG	LNG	TD
1	Roman Hemby	RB	9	203	22.6	34	0
18	Solomon Vanhorse	RB	1	5	5.0	5	0
	TOTALS		10	208	20.8	34	0
	OPPONENTS		29	577	19.9	39	0

Punt return statistics
#	NAME	POS	RET	YDS	AVG	LNG	TD
0	Jonathan Brady	WR	18	315	17.5	91	1
5	D'Angelo Ponds	DB	1	33	33.0	22	1
2	Makai Jackson	WR	1	11	11.0	11	0
	TOTALS		20	359	18.0	91	2
	OPPONENTS		11	87	7.9	17	0
