= Mark Langston (American football) =

American football player

Profile
- Position: Long snapper

Personal information
- Born: Savannah, Georgia, U.S.
- Listed height: 5 ft 11 in (1.80 m)
- Listed weight: 232 lb (105 kg)

Career information
- High school: Savannah Christian
- College: Kennesaw State (2019–2020); Georgia Southern (2021–2023); Indiana (2024–2025)
- NFL draft: 2026: undrafted

Career history
- Buffalo Bills (2026)*
- * Offseason or practice squad member only

Awards and highlights
- CFP national champion (2025); First-team All-Big Ten (2025)
- Stats at ESPN

Mark Logan Langston is an American professional football long snapper. He played college football for the Kennesaw State Owls, Georgia Southern Eagles, and Indiana Hoosiers. Langston was signed by the Buffalo Bills of the National Football League (NFL) as an undrafted free agent in 2026.

== Early life ==
Langston was born in Savannah, Georgia, and attended Savannah Christian Preparatory School, where he played on the school's football and baseball teams. On the football team, in addition to long snapper, Langston also played defensive end, linebacker, and tight end. In his senior year, he was named second-team all-state as a defensive player and first-team all-state at long snapper. He won a state championship on the baseball team in 2017. In 2018, his senior year, Savannah Christian's football team advanced as far as the state quarterfinals.

== College career ==
Langston walked on to the Kennesaw State Owls football team in 2019 alongside his former Savannah Christian teammate, kicker and punter Noah Chumley. He took a redshirt in 2019 and did not appear in a game in 2020, transferring to the Georgia Southern Eagles after the season. In 2021, he started in all 12 games for the Eagles. He also started in 10 games in 2022 before suffering a torn ACL. He missed the entire 2023 season while recovering from the injury. He then transferred to the Indiana Hoosiers, earning an honorable mention to the All-Big Ten team in 2024. Langston was named first-team All-Big Ten in 2025; Indiana finished the season with a win in the 2026 College Football Playoff National Championship.

== Professional career ==
Pre-draft measurables
| Height | Weight | Arm length | Hand span | Wingspan | Vertical jump | Broad jump | Bench press |
|---|---|---|---|---|---|---|---|
| 5 ft 11 3/8 in (1.81 m) | 232 lb (105 kg) | 30 in (0.76 m) | 9 in (0.23 m) | 6 ft 3 5/8 in (1.92 m) | 31.5 in (0.80 m) | 9 ft 0 in (2.74 m) | 31 reps |
All values from Pro Day

After going unselected in the 2026 NFL draft, the Buffalo Bills signed Langston as an undrafted free agent. He was released on June 25.

== Personal life ==
Langston's father played baseball for the East Tennessee State Buccaneers baseball team. Langston and Indiana Hoosiers punter Mitch McCarthy credit Call of Duty: Warzone for helping the two players build friendship and football rapport. Langston calls himself a "data nerd", and tracks and analyzes his own football performance in Microsoft Excel.
