= LeBron Bond =

American college football player (born 2007)

No. 6 – Indiana Hoosiers
- Position: Wide receiver
- Class: Freshman

Personal information
- Born: February 24, 2007 (age 19)
- Listed height: 5 ft 9 in (1.75 m)
- Listed weight: 175 lb (79 kg)

Career information
- High school: Matthew Fontaine Maury (Norfolk, Virginia)
- College: Indiana (2025–present)

Awards and highlights
- CFP national champion (2025)
- Stats at ESPN

LeBron Bond (born February 24, 2007) is an American college football wide receiver for the Indiana Hoosiers. He played high school football and ran track at Matthew Fontaine Maury High School in Norfolk, Virginia, becoming both an All-American in the latter sport and being selected to the first-team all-state football team as a wide receiver and return specialist. He received 21 NCAA Division I college football offers, including from Boston College, Duke, Maryland, Syracuse, and Virginia Tech, before ultimately committing to Indiana in April 2024. Bond is part of the 2025 Indiana Hoosiers football team that won the 2026 College Football Playoff National Championship.

== Early life ==
Bond was born on February 24, 2007, to Levar and Lachele Bond, and is a native of Norfolk, Virginia. He is named for basketball player LeBron James. Bond ran high school track at Matthew Fontaine Maury High School in Norfolk, where he qualified twice in the 55-meter dash at state and placed fourth as a sophomore and sixth as a junior for state track finals. He also qualified for the Adidas Track Nationals and placed fifth in the 200-yard dash as a sophomore at state track finals as well. Bond received All-American track honors after posting a 10.7 second 100-meter dash and a 21.8 200-meter run. Bond also played high school football as a wide receiver, catching 47 passes for 1,347 yards and 16 touchdowns in 2023 as his high school team finished 15–0 and won the state title. He also averaged an explosive 28.7 yards per catch that season. In his senior season, Bond had 1,098 all-purpose yards and 15 touchdowns as his team went undefeated and won the state title for the second year in a row. He was also named first-team all-state as a wide receiver, and as a return specialist.

Bond was rated as a four-star recruit by ESPN and a three-star recruit by 247Sports, On3, and Rivals. He was ranked as the No. 51 wide receiver nationally from ESPN and a top-30 recruit from Virginia, according to 247Sports, On3, and Rivals. He received 21 NCAA Division I offers, including from Boston College, Buffalo, Charlotte, Coastal Carolina, Duke, East Carolina, Howard, Indiana, James Madison, Liberty, Marshall, Maryland, New Hampshire, Ohio, Old Dominion, Syracuse, Temple, Towson, UMass, Virginia Tech, and West Virginia. Bond visited Indiana in early 2024 before announcing his commitment there on April 7, 2024, having been recruited by the team's offensive coordinator Mike Shanahan. Bond was the first wide receiver commit of Indiana's 2025 recruiting class.

College recruiting
Name	Hometown	School	Height	Weight	Commit date
LeBron Bond; WR	Norfolk, VA	Matthew Fontaine Maury	5 ft 10 in (1.78 m)	165 lb (75 kg)	Apr 7, 2024
LeBron Bond; WR	Recruit ratings: Rivals: 247Sports: ESPN: (80)				

== College career ==
Bond caught four passes for 29 yards and one touchdown in Indiana's spring game. At 5 foot 9 inches, Bond was tied as the second-shortest player for the 2025 Indiana Hoosiers football team, with cornerback D'Angelo Ponds. Coach Curt Cignetti stated about Bond, "Still [need to see] a little bit more consistency, but he is in the position to help us this fall." Bond saw limited action in his first season with Indiana despite appearing in 13 games, catching 5 passes for 49 yards with his longest catch of 14 yards coming against Maryland in a 55–10 win in Week 10. He became a College Football Playoff National Champion after Indiana defeated Miami 27–21 in the 2026 College Football Playoff National Championship.
