= Khobie Martin =

American college football player (born 2006)

No. 28 – Indiana Hoosiers
- Position: Running back
- Class: Redshirt Sophomore

Personal information
- Born: May 10, 2006 (age 20)
- Listed height: 6 ft 0 in (1.83 m)
- Listed weight: 204 lb (93 kg)

Career information
- High school: Fishers (Fishers, Indiana)
- College: Indiana (2024–present)

Awards and highlights
- CFP national champion (2025)
- Stats at ESPN

Khobie Martin (born May 10, 2006) is an American college football running back for the Indiana Hoosiers.

== Early life ==
Martin began playing football in third grade. He attended Fishers High School in Fishers, Indiana, where he played high school football as a running back. He rushed for 2,746 yards and 38 touchdowns in three seasons, including 1,379 yards and 19 touchdowns in his senior year.

Martin was a consensus three-star recruit and was rated as a top-100 running back in the country by 247Sports and ESPN. He received offers from Austin Peay, Ball State, Eastern Kentucky, Illinois State, Indiana State, Miami (OH), and Northern Illinois before verbally committing to Miami in April 2023. However, he then received an offer from Indiana under then-head coach Tom Allen later in September and ultimately flipped to Indiana, signing with the team three months later.

College recruiting
| Name | Hometown | School | Height | Weight | Commit date |
|---|---|---|---|---|---|
| Khobie Martin; RB | Fishers, IN | Fishers High School | 6 ft 0 in (1.83 m) | 200 lb (91 kg) | September 22, 2023 |
| Khobie Martin; RB | Recruit ratings: Rivals: 247Sports: ESPN: (74) | | | | |

== College career ==
Martin made his college debut under new head coach Curt Cignetti in Week 2 of the 2024 Indiana Hoosiers season against Western Illinois, rushing for 57 yards on eight carries, including a 31-yard rush late in the fourth quarter of a 77–3 win. He then appeared in Week 4's matchup against Charlotte 49ers, rushing six times for 16 yards in a 52–14 win.

Martin entered Indiana's 2025 season as the fourth-string running back behind redshirt seniors Roman Hemby and Kaelon Black, and redshirt junior Lee Beebe Jr. He rushed for 109 yards on 11 carries with two touchdowns in a 73–0 win in Week 3 against Indiana State, marking the first 100-yard rushing performance of his college career. Martin also saw increased on-field action after Beebe suffered a season-ending non-contact knee injury in the same week, with Cignetti saying "He's got talent, and he'll get more reps. ... We're going to need him." In the next game against No. 9 Illinois, Martin scored two touchdowns on 12 carries for 107 yards in Indiana's 63–10 blowout win; he had back-to-back games with 100+ yards rushing and multiple touchdowns scored as a result. He also had 11 carries for 80 yards and a touchdown in a 55–10 win over Maryland. Martin added another touchdown on a 21-yard rush against Purdue as he rushed for 51 yards on 8 carries in Indiana's 56–3 win in Week 14. Throughout Indiana's regular season in 2025, Martin was a more efficient runner with 6.5 yards per carry, compared to Black's 5.6 yards and Hemby's 5.2 yards per carry, respectively. Martin's 452 yards rushing in the regular season was also the most by a freshman running back in Indiana since Stevie Scott in 2018.

Heading into his sophomore season, Martin was expected to take on a larger role as the 3rd running back in the rotation, and due to Indiana using multiple running backs frequently. In week 1 against North Texas, Martin broke multiple bones in his arm while attempting to block a linebacker.
