= Hosea Wheeler =

American football player

No. 0 – Baylor Bears
- Position: Defensive lineman
- Class: Redshirt Senior

Personal information
- Listed height: 6 ft 3 in (1.91 m)
- Listed weight: 306 lb (139 kg)

Career information
- High school: Franklin (Elk Grove, California)
- College: Sacramento City (2021); Western Kentucky (2022–2024); Indiana (2025); Baylor (2026–present)

Awards and highlights
- CFP national champion (2025); First-team All-Conference USA (2024); Second-team All-Conference USA (2023)
- Stats at ESPN

Hosea Wheeler is an American college football defensive lineman for the Baylor Bears. He previously played for the Sacramento City Panthers, Western Kentucky Hilltoppers, and Indiana Hoosiers.

== Early life ==
Wheeler attended Franklin High School in Elk Grove, California. He was a defensive lineman and tight end on the school's football team. An unranked college football prospect with no scholarship offers from major programs, he committed to play for the Sacramento City Panthers.

== College career ==
Wheeler played his first season of college football for the Sacramento City Panthers, recording 24 tackles in nine games. He played the 2022–2024 seasons for the Western Kentucky Hilltoppers, redshirting the 2022 season after appearing in four games. He played in all 13 of Western Kentucky's games in 2023, starting in 11 games and recording 42 tackles, two sacks, one forced fumble, and one interception. Wheeler was named second-team All-Conference USA at defensive tackle in 2023. He started in all 14 games in 2024, recording 75 tackles, two sacks, one forced fumble, one fumble recovery, and two blocked kicks. Wheeler was named first-team All-Conference USA in 2024.

Wheeler transferred to play for the Indiana Hoosiers in 2025, a team that had vacancies at defensive tackle after the graduation of James Carpenter and CJ West. He made one tackle in Indiana's 27–21 win against the Miami Hurricanes in the 2026 College Football Playoff National Championship. At the end of the 2025 season, Wheeler entered the NCAA transfer portal.

On January 25, 2026, Wheeler announced his transfer to the Baylor Bears.
