= Devan Boykin =

American football player (born 2002)

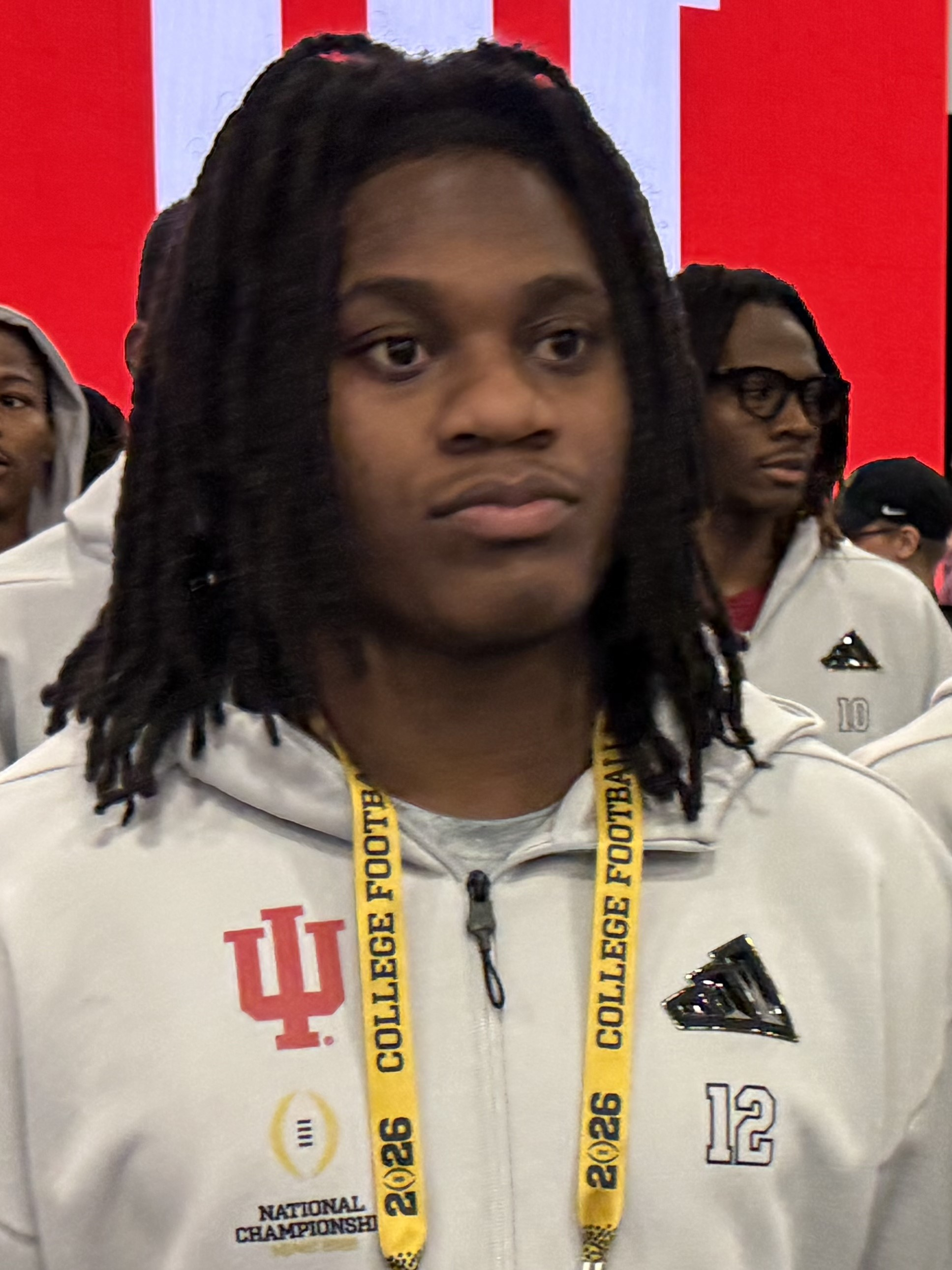
- Boykin in 2026

Columbus Aviators
- Position: Cornerback
- Roster status: Unsigned draft pick

Personal information
- Born: January 25, 2002 (age 24)
- Listed height: 5 ft 10 in (1.78 m)
- Listed weight: 192 lb (87 kg)

Career information
- High school: Ragsdale (Jamestown, North Carolina)
- College: NC State (2020–2024); Indiana (2025)
- NFL draft: 2026: undrafted

Career history
- Pittsburgh Steelers (2026)*; Columbus Aviators (2027-present)
- * Offseason or practice squad member only

Awards and highlights
- CFP national champion (2025)
- Stats at ESPN

Devan Boykin (born January 25, 2002) is an American professional football cornerback. He played college football for the NC State Wolfpack and Indiana Hoosiers, winning the 2025 national championship with the latter. Boykin was signed by the Pittsburgh Steelers of the National Football League (NFL) as an undrafted free agent in 2026.

== Early life ==
Boykin was born January 25, 2002. He attended Ragsdale High School in Jamestown, North Carolina, where he played cornerback, wide receiver, and quarterback on the school's football team. His father, Johnny, was the head coach of the team. Boykin was an all-state selection as a senior and was rated a three-star college football prospect by ESPN, 247Sports, and Rivals.com. He also played basketball at Ragsdale.

== College career ==
Boykin began his college football career with the NC State Wolfpack. In 2020, he played in 12 games with two starts, recording 19 tackles and two pass breakups. He appeared in 11 games in 2021 with five starts, recording 24 tackles, four pass breakups, and, in a game against the Boston College Eagles, one fumble recovery for a touchdown. NC State was selected to play in the 2021 Holiday Bowl, but the game was canceled five hours before the scheduled start time; the team's opponent, the UCLA Bruins, had announced that they could not play due to an outbreak of COVID-19 on the team.

In 2022, Boykin played in 11 games with three starts, recording 20 tackles, one pass breakup, and one interception. The interception, in a game against the Florida State Seminoles, occurred in the end zone with 38 seconds left in the game to clinch a victory. NC State was selected to play in the 2022 Duke's Mayo Bowl, but Boykin could not play due to injury.

Boykin played in 11 games, with 10 starts, in 2023, recording 54 tackles, four pass breakups, three interceptions, and one forced fumble, including an eight-tackle, one-interception performance in a win in a rivalry game against the Clemson Tigers. Boykin suffered an ACL tear during a practice while preparing for the 2023 Pop-Tarts Bowl; he was originally projected to be healthy enough for the start of the 2024 season and though he announced he would return to NC State in 2024, his recovery timeline was set back multiple times. Cleared to begin practicing in November, he ultimately missed the entire season while recovering from the injury, taking a redshirt for the season.

In January 2025, Boykin entered the NCAA transfer portal. He transferred to play the 2025 season, his final year of NCAA eligibility, with the Indiana Hoosiers. He led all Indiana players with seven tackles, and additionally recorded a sack, in a 38–3 win against the Alabama Crimson Tide in the 2026 Rose Bowl. In Indiana's 27–21 win over the Miami Hurricanes in the 2026 College Football Playoff National Championship, he made four tackles. Lauded for his versatility, Boykin played free safety, strong safety, and nickelback at both NC State and Indiana.

Boykin earned a degree in sports management from North Carolina State University.

== Professional career ==
Pre-draft measurables
Height	Weight	Arm length	Hand span	Wingspan	40-yard dash	10-yard split	20-yard split	20-yard shuttle	Three-cone drill	Vertical jump	Broad jump	Bench press
5 ft 10 in (1.78 m)	192 lb (87 kg)	29 1/4 in (0.74 m)	8 3/8 in (0.21 m)	6 ft 0 in (1.83 m)	4.64 s	1.62 s	2.67 s	4.18 s	7.18 s	33.5 in (0.85 m)	9 ft 10 in (3.00 m)	13 reps
All values from Pro Day

After going unselected in the 2026 NFL draft, Boykin was signed by the Pittsburgh Steelers as an undrafted free agent. He was waived by the Steelers as a part of final roster cuts on August 30, 2026.
