= Dominique Ratcliff =

American college football player (born 2001)

No. 91 – Indiana Hoosiers
- Position: Defensive tackle
- Class: Redshirt Senior

Personal information
- Born: December 13, 2001 (age 24)
- Listed height: 6 ft 3 in (1.91 m)
- Listed weight: 296 lb (134 kg)

Career information
- High school: Conroe
- College: Louisiana (2020–2021); Texas State (2022–2024); Indiana (2025–present)

Awards and highlights
- CFP national champion (2025)
- Stats at ESPN

Dominique Ratcliff (born December 13, 2001) is an American college football defensive lineman who plays for the Indiana Hoosiers. He played high school football at Conroe High School and previously played college football for the Louisiana Ragin' Cajuns and the Texas State Bobcats. Ratcliff is part of the 2025 Indiana Hoosiers football team that went on to win the 2026 College Football Playoff National Championship.

== Early life ==
Ratcliff attended Conroe High School in Conroe, Texas, where he emerged as a standout defensive tackle. As a high school football player, he accumulated 118 tackles, 33 tackles for loss, 11.5 sacks, four forced fumbles, an interception, and a blocked punt, earning all-county honors and scout rankings among the top defensive tackles in his region. He received offers from Abilene, Air Force, Army, Houston Christian, Liberty, Louisiana, McNeese, Navy, Prairie View, Texas State, Toledo, and Wyoming, and ultimately committed to Louisiana at the University of Louisiana at Lafayette in June 2019.

== College career ==
Ratcliff began his collegiate career at the University of Louisiana at Lafayette, where he redshirted his first season and appeared in a single game in 2021. He then transferred to Texas State University in December 2021, where he played three seasons from 2022 to 2024, including his redshirt year. In 2024, Ratcliff had 22 tackles, 3.5 tackles for loss, and two sacks for the Bobcats. He accumulated 45 tackles, seven tackles for loss and three sacks during his three seasons at Texas State.

In December 2024, Ratcliff announced his commitment to the Indiana Hoosiers as a transfer portal addition for the 2025 season. He recorded a sack in Indiana's 31–7 win against Wisconsin in Week 12. Ratcliff had 13 tackles, including eight solo tackles, along with 1.5 sacks in his first season with Indiana. He played in Indiana's 56–22 win over Oregon in the 2026 Peach Bowl, where he had a tackle and a sack on Dante Moore split with fellow defensive lineman Tyrique Tucker. He also started in the 2026 College Football Playoff National Championship against the Miami Hurricanes, which they won 27–21, making Ratcliff a College Football Playoff national champion.

== Personal life ==
He is the son of Michael and Keisha Ratcliff and has one sister, Victoria. He earned a bachelor’s degree in health fitness management with a minor in business at Texas State before transferring to Indiana.
