= Lee Beebe Jr. =

American football player

No. 29 – Indiana Hoosiers
- Position: Running back
- Class: Redshirt Junior

Personal information
- Listed height: 5 ft 10 in (1.78 m)
- Listed weight: 220 lb (100 kg)

Career information
- High school: Park Crossing (Montgomery, Alabama)
- College: UAB (2022–2024); Indiana (2025–present)

Awards and highlights
- CFP national champion (2025); Third-team All-AAC (2024)
- Stats at ESPN

Lee Beebe Jr. is an American college football running back for the Indiana Hoosiers. He previously played for the UAB Blazers.

== Early life ==
Beebe attended Park Crossing High School in Montgomery, Alabama. He played wide receiver and running back on the school's football team. Beebe did not receive any offers to play for an NCAA Division I team coming out of high school, so he attended a summer training camp for the UAB Blazers and earned a place on the team as a walk-on running back.

== College career ==
Beebe played in one game in 2022, recording three carries for 32 yards. In 2023, he recorded 52 carries for 360 yards and four touchdowns while adding 14 receptions for 98 yards.

In 2024, Beebe rushed for 884 yards and seven touchdowns and additionally recorded 30 receptions for 219 yards and one touchdown; he was named third-team All-AAC. He rushed for 85 yards and two touchdowns in a 41–3 win against the Alcorn State Braves. In a 40–14 win against the Rice Owls, Beebe rushed for 161 yards and two touchdowns.

Beebe transferred to play for the Indiana Hoosiers after the 2024 season. He played in three games in 2025, recording 27 carries for 209 yards and one touchdown with one reception for seven yards. In the third quarter of Indiana's 73–0 win against the Indiana State Sycamores, Beebe sustained a non-contact right knee injury that ended his season. Indiana finished the season with a win in the 2026 College Football Playoff National Championship.

Beebe returned to Indiana for the 2026 season. On September 25, amidst injuries to fellow running backs Khobie Martin and Turbo Richard, Beebe recorded 24 carries for 203 yards and a touchdown in a 29–23 win against the Northwestern Wildcats.

== Personal life ==
Beebe's brother, Solomon, also played running back for the UAB Blazers alongside Lee in 2024.
