= Zen Michalski =

American football player

No. 75
- Position: Offensive tackle

Personal information
- Listed height: 6 ft 6 in (1.98 m)
- Listed weight: 310 lb (141 kg)

Career information
- High school: Floyd Central (Floyds Knobs, Indiana)
- College: Ohio State (2021–2024); Indiana (2025)

Awards and highlights
- 2022 Rose Bowl champion; 2× CFP national champion (2024, 2025)
- Stats at ESPN

Zenuae "Zen" Michalski is a former American college football offensive tackle who played for the Indiana Hoosiers and Ohio State Buckeyes.

== Early life ==
Michalski was born and grew up in Floyds Knobs, Indiana. He attended Floyd Central High School. After receiving over 30 college offers, he narrowed his 4 final schools down and chose Louisville, but later decommitted, and chose Ohio State over Florida State and Penn State.

== College career ==
=== Ohio State ===
Over the 2021, 2022, and 2023 seasons, Michalski played 102 snaps as a backup. During the 2024 season, Michalski got his first significant playing time, including playing 105 snaps as a backup. After starting left tackle Josh Simmons got injured during Ohio State's 32–31 loss against Oregon, Michalski replaced Simmons, and was later named starter after Simmons was declared out for the season. He made his first start during the Buckeyes' 21–17 win over Nebraska but struggled, giving up two sacks and two pressures, and was later carted off the field injured late in the game. He was ruled out for Ohio State's 20–13 win over rival Penn State the next week. For the game against Purdue, he was ruled out once again. After the season, Michalski entered the transfer portal on December 20, 2024.

=== Indiana ===
On January 4, 2025, Michalski transferred to Indiana.

Following the conclusion of the season, Zen announced his retirement from football after helping lead Indiana University to a national championship. In a public statement, he reflected on his career and the decision to step away from the sport.

Zen stated that it had been “a blessing and an honor” to represent both Indiana and Ohio State during his collegiate career. He noted that, after receiving frequent questions about a potential transition to professional football, he had spent considerable time evaluating his future. Ultimately, he decided to retire from the sport, describing the decision as one he had been contemplating for some time.
