= Matthew Fontaine Maury High School =

Public high school in Virginia, US

Coordinates: 36°51′55.6″N 76°17′25.4″W

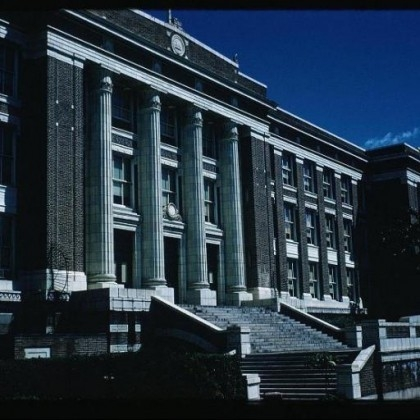
- Maury High School in 1961

Location
- 322 Shirley Avenue; Norfolk, Virginia 23517; United States

Information
- School type: Public, high school
- Founded: 1911
- School district: Norfolk Public Schools
- Superintendent: Sharon I. Byrdsong
- Principal: Karen Berg
- Staff: 126.42 (2020-21)(FTE)
- Grades: 9–12
- Enrollment: 1,565 (2020-21)
- Student to teacher ratio: 12.38 (2020-21)
- Language: English
- Campus: City
- Colors: Burnt orange and navy
- Athletics conference: Virginia High School League (Eastern District)
- Mascot: Commodores
- Rival: Granby High School
- Website: Official Site

Matthew Fontaine Maury High School also known as Maury High School, is a high school located in the Ghent area of Norfolk, Virginia, United States. Maury's school mascot is the Commodore. The high school is named after Matthew Fontaine Maury. Maury High School has a Pre-Medical Health and Specialities Program for 9th-12th graders. It is the only school in the district to have this type of speciality program.

== History ==
Maury High School opened its doors in 1911 and was completely renovated in 1986. This modernization maintained the architectural integrity of the original neo-classical structure while converting Maury into an educational facility complete with media center and cafeteria atria where unused courtyards once stood.

== Attendance zone ==
On-property housing for Joint Forces Staff College is zoned to Maury, so dependent children living on-base attend Maury.

== Athletics ==
The boys basketball team won the VHSL state championship in 1927 and 2019. The Commodores lost the state championship game in 1979 and 2022.

In football, the Commodores won the state championship in 1939. Eight decades later, a football dynasty started when Maury won the 2019 VHSL title. The Commodores fell short in the 2021 and '22 championship games before winning three in a row (2023–25).

== Notable alumni ==
- Kishi Bashi (1994), singer and songwriter
- Lewis Binford (1950), archaeologist, early pioneer of Processual archaeology/New archaeology.
- LeBron Bond (2025), college football wide receiver for the Indiana Hoosiers
- Kam Chancellor (2006), member of the Virginia Tech Sports Hall of Fame, Super Bowl XLVIII champion, safety for the Seattle Seahawks in the NFL
- Matt Coleman III (born 1998), basketball player for Hapoel Haifa of the Israeli Basketball Premier League
- Samuel Face, inventor known for his work in concrete technology
- Harlan N. Hartness (1916), U.S. Army major general
- Fred "JayR" Johnson (2020): college football wide receiver for the South Carolina Gamecocks
- KeAndre Lambert-Smith (2020): NFL wide receiver for the Los Angeles Chargers
- Roy Martin (1939): 131st mayor of Norfolk, 31st President of the United States Conference of Mayors
- Au'Tori Newkirk (2025): quarterback for the North Carolina Tar Heels
- Emmy Raver-Lampman (2007): Actress and Singer. Most notable for Netflix series The Umbrella Academy (2019–present), which is her breakthrough role.
- LaRoy Reynolds (2009): linebacker for the Atlanta Falcons in the NFL
- Al Richter: Major League Baseball player
- Ed Schultz (1972): liberal political commentator and host of radio program The Ed Schultz Show and television program The Ed Show, college football play-by-play announcer for North Dakota State and North Dakota
- Tommy Scott (1926): first head football coach at Old Dominion University
- Joe Smith (1993): basketball player and number-one pick in the 1995 NBA draft
- Keely Smith (1946): singer
- Tony Tchani (2008): Major League Soccer midfielder and winner of the 2009 General Douglas MacArthur Memorial Trophy, awarded to the most outstanding collegiate athlete who attended high school in Virginia.
- John Charles Thomas (judge) (1968): first African American of the Virginia state supreme court
- G. William Whitehurst (1942): professor at Old Dominion University, Republican United States Representative for Virginia's 2nd congressional district (1969–1987)
