= Byron Baldwin =

American football player (born 2007)

No. 2 – Indiana Hoosiers
- Position: Defensive back
- Class: Sophomore

Personal information
- Born: February 8, 2007 (age 19)
- Listed height: 6 ft 2 in (1.88 m)
- Listed weight: 192 lb (87 kg)

Career information
- High school: Saint Frances Academy (Baltimore, Maryland)
- College: Indiana (2025–present)

Awards and highlights
- CFP national champion (2025)
- Stats at ESPN

Byron Baldwin Jr. (born February 8, 2007) is an American college football defensive back for the Indiana Hoosiers.

== Early life ==
Baldwin attended Saint Frances Academy in Baltimore, Maryland. As a junior, he had 89 tackles, four pass break ups, two interceptions and two forced fumbles. On April 17, 2024, Baldwin committed to play college football at Indiana University. On October 2, he decommitted from Indiana after a visit to Colorado. On November 15, Baldwin recommitted to Indiana. He was a four-star recruit and the highest rated among Indiana's commits.

== College career ==
Baldwin impressed early in fall camp, with defensive backs coach Ola Adams saying he is "[a]lready physically-able, and mentally is able to pick up what we're putting down a lot faster than most freshman". He missed the first seven games of the 2025 season due to a lower-body injury but appeared in seven games on kickoff coverage. Baldwin finished his freshman campaign with ten tackles and a fumble recovery. He also had a tackle in the College Football Playoff National Championship.
