= Mitch McCarthy =

Australian gridiron football player (born 1997)

- McCarthy with the Hamilton Tiger-Cats in 2026

Profile
- Position: Punter

Personal information
- Born: 10 October 1997 (age 29); Melbourne, Australia
- Listed height: 6 ft 5 in (1.96 m)
- Listed weight: 233 lb (106 kg)

Career information
- High school: Village Christian (Los Angeles, California)
- College: UCF (2022–2024); Indiana (2025)
- NFL draft: 2026: undrafted
- CFL draft: 2026G: 2nd round, 14th overall pick

Career history
- Hamilton Tiger-Cats (2026)

Awards and highlights
- CFP national champion (2025)
- Stats at CFL.ca

Mitch McCarthy (born 10 October 1997) is an Australian professional gridiron football punter. He played college football for the UCF Knights and Indiana Hoosiers.

== College career ==
McCarthy first played college football for the UCF Knights from 2022 to 2024. He played in 37 games where he had 115 punts with a 43.0-yard average and a career-long of 64 yards. He then transferred to Indiana University Bloomington to play for the Hoosiers where he played in 14 games and punted 37 times with a 41.6-yard average and a long of 55 yards. He also played in the 2026 College Football Playoff National Championship where he had five punts with a 48.2-yard average, with two punts inside the 20-yard line and a long of 55 yards, in the 27–21 victory.

== Professional career ==
McCarthy was drafted in the second round, 14th overall, by the Hamilton Tiger-Cats in the 2026 CFL global draft and signed with the team on 13 May 2026. He won the team's punter position battle in training camp and played in his first professional game on 4 June 2026, against the Montreal Alouettes, where he punted five times for a 41.4-yard average. On October 26, he was released.

== Career statistics ==
College statistics
Season	Team	Games	Punting			
Season	Team	GP	Punts	Avg	Lng	Yds
2022	UCF	12	39	43.5	60	1,698
2023	UCF	13	36	41.3	64	1,485
2024	UCF	12	40	44.1	56	1,765
2025	Indiana	14	37	41.6	55	1,541
Career		51	154	42.7	64	6,573
