= Stephen Daley (American football) =

American football player

No. 8 – Indiana Hoosiers
- Position: Defensive lineman
- Class: Senior

Personal information
- Listed height: 6 ft 1 in (1.85 m)
- Listed weight: 260 lb (118 kg)

Career information
- High school: John Handley (Winchester, Virginia)
- College: Kent State (2022–2024); Indiana (2025-present)

Awards and highlights
- CFP national champion (2025)
- Stats at ESPN

Stephen Daley is an American football defensive lineman for the Indiana Hoosiers. He previously played for the Kent State Golden Flashes.

== Early life ==
Daley attended John Handley High School in Winchester, Virginia. During his high school career, he played football, basketball, and track and field, where he starred in football, committing to play college football for Kent State over an offer from James Madison.

== College career ==
=== Kent State ===
During his three year career at Kent State from 2022 through 2024, where he appeared in 34 games and compiled 103 tackles with 16 tackles for loss, six sacks, one interception, three passes defended, two fumble recoveries and a forced fumble. After the conclusion of the 2024 season, Daley entered his name into the NCAA transfer portal.

=== Indiana ===
Daley transferred to play for the Indiana Hoosiers. In week three of the 2025 season, he recorded two tackles both going for a loss, in a blowout victory against Indiana State. In week twelve, he notched four tackles with three being for a loss, and a forced fumble in a victory versus Wisconsin. Daley led the Big Ten in tackles for loss with 19, but suffered an injury when celebrating with a fan on the sidelines immediately after Indiana's victory in the conference championship game. The injury caused him to miss the entirety of the Hoosiers' postseason run, which culminated in a national championship. Following a preliminary injunction by U.S. District Judge Charlotte Sweeney granting qualifying athletes from the high school class of 2022 a fifth season of eligibility, Daley elected to return to Indiana for the 2026 season.
