= Daniel Ndukwe =

American football player

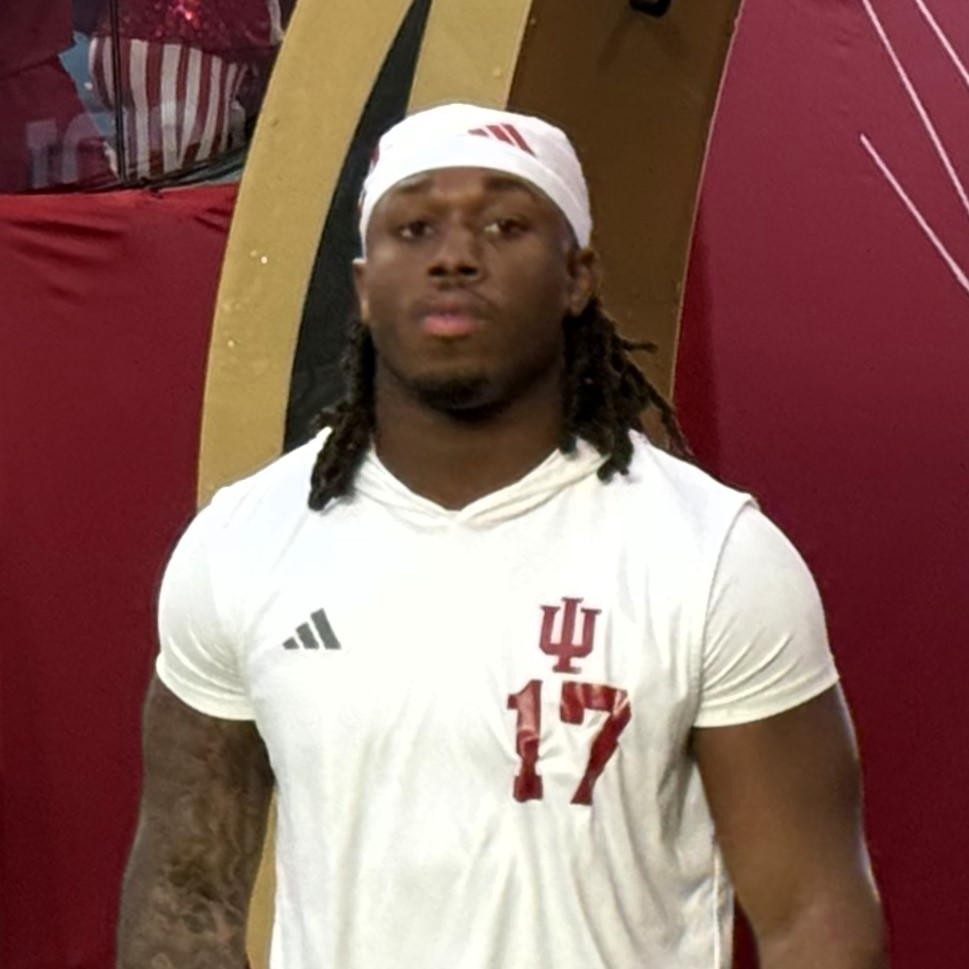
- Ndukwe in 2026

No. 17 – Indiana Hoosiers
- Position: Defensive lineman
- Class: Sophomore

Personal information
- Listed height: 6 ft 3 in (1.91 m)
- Listed weight: 244 lb (111 kg)

Career information
- High school: Arabia Mountain (Stonecrest, Georgia)
- College: Indiana (2024–present)

Awards and highlights
- CFP national champion (2025)
- Stats at ESPN

Daniel Ndukwe is an American college football defensive lineman for the Indiana Hoosiers.

== Early life ==
Ndukwe attended Arabia Mountain High School in Stonecrest, Georgia. He was rated as a three-star recruit and the 109th overall edge rusher in the class of 2024 by 247Sports, and committed to play college football for the James Madison Dukes over offers from other schools such as Appalachian State, Arkansas State, Army, Bowling Green, Coastal Carolina, Eastern Michigan, Memphis, Toledo, Tulane, and UCF. However, Ndukwe flipped his commitment to play for the Indiana Hoosiers after James Madison head coach Curt Cignetti was hired by the Hoosiers.

== College career ==
As a freshman in 2024, Ndukwe played in all 12 games, recording one tackle. He got his first start in the 2026 Peach Bowl due to multiple injuries on the Hoosiers defensive line. During the game, he posted three tackles, two sacks, a forced fumble, and a blocked punt in a blowout win over Oregon to send Indiana to the National Championship.
