= Mike Shanahan (tight end) =

American football player and coach (born 1989)

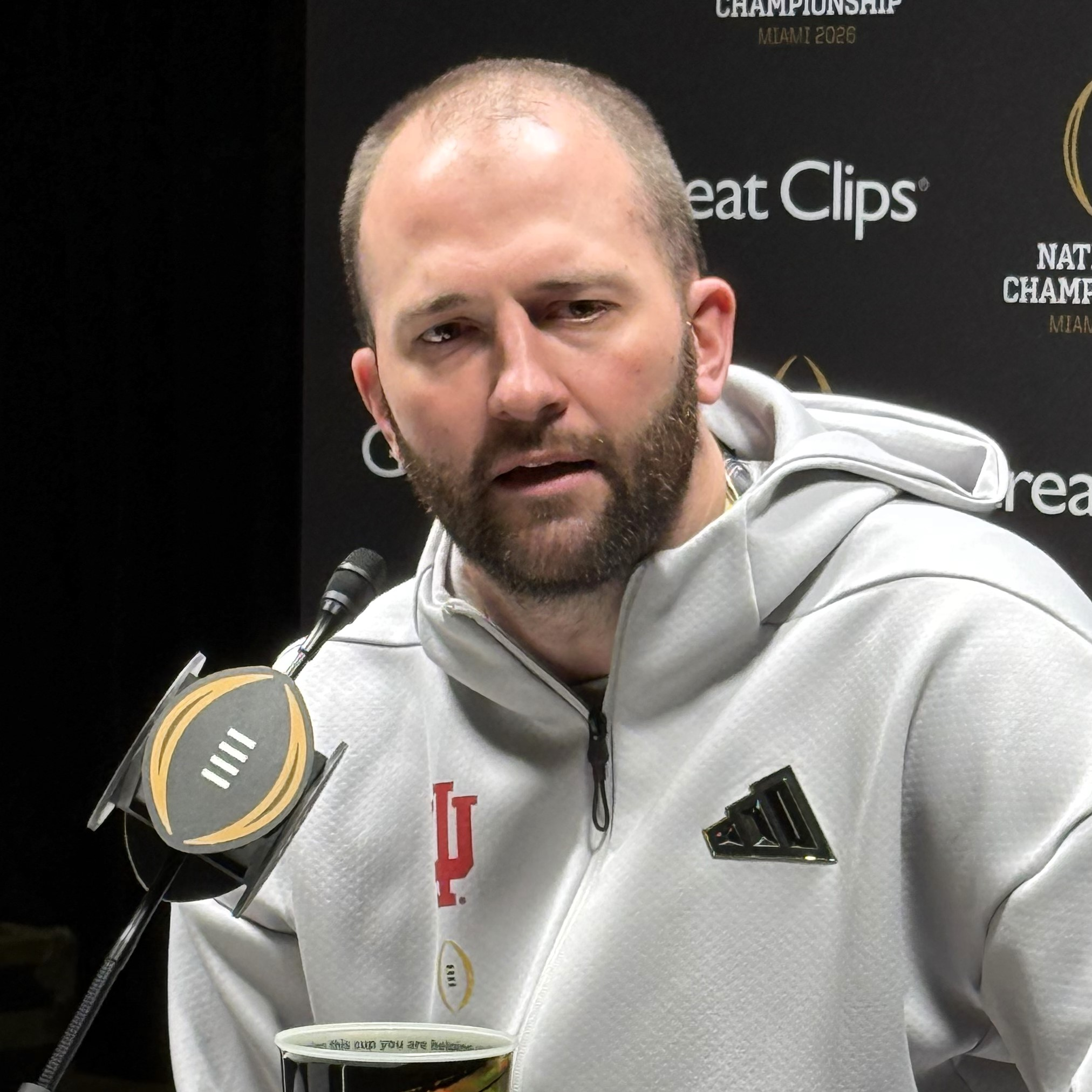
- Shanahan in 2026

Current position
- Title: Offensive coordinator, wide receivers coach
- Team: Indiana
- Conference: Big Ten

Biographical details
- Born: December 28, 1989 (age 36); North Huntingdon, Pennsylvania, U.S.

Playing career
- 2008–2012: Pittsburgh
- Position: Wide receiver

Coaching career (HC unless noted)
- 2014: Pittsburgh (volunteer assistant)
- 2015: Pittsburgh (GA)
- 2016: IUP (WR)
- 2017–2018: Elon (WR)
- 2019–2020: James Madison (WR/RC)
- 2021–2023: James Madison (OC/WR/RC)
- 2024–present: Indiana (OC/WR)

Accomplishments and honors

Awards
- Second-team All-Big East (2012)

Michael Andrew Shanahan (born December 28, 1989) is an American football coach and former player who is the current offensive coordinator of the Indiana Hoosiers. He played college football as a wide receiver for the Pittsburgh Panthers and was signed by the New York Jets as an undrafted free agent in 2013.

== Early life ==
Shanahan attended Norwin High School in North Huntingdon, Pennsylvania. He was selected to the Associated Press Pennsylvania Class AAAA All-State First-team. He was a Division I prospect in both football and basketball while at Norwin High School. He was selected to the Pittsburgh Post-Gazette "Fabulous 22" and selected to the Pittsburgh Tribune-Review "Terrific 25". He also was selected to The Patriot-News "Platinum 33". He was three-time first-team All-Foothills Conference selection. He was ranked as No. 16 overall prospect of Pennsylvania according to Scout.com. He was ranked as the No. 21 prospect by SuperPrep, ranked as the No. 24 prospect by Keystone Recruiting and also was ranked as the No. 37 prospect by Rivals.com. He was ranked No. 52 on Scout's East Top 100 list. He was selected to the PrepStar All-East Region, SuperPrep All-Northeast Team and was selected to play in the Big 33 Football Classic. He also was selected to the Pittsburgh Post-Gazette "Fabulous Five" and was a Pittsburgh Tribune-Review "Terrific 10" honoree. He played basketball and was a AAU basketball teammate of former Pittsburgh Panthers and former Kansas City Chiefs wide receiver Jon Baldwin.

== College career ==
Shanahan redshirted as a true freshman and did not play the entire season. In his freshman season, Shanahan recorded 15 receptions and 211 receiving yards. He was selected to the Big East All-Academic Football Team. In his sophomore season, Shanahan had 43 receptions, 589 receiving yards, and one receiving touchdown. He was selected to the Big East All-Academic Football Team for the second straight season. In his junior season, Shanahan had 39 receptions, 493 receiving yards, and four receiving touchdowns. He was selected to the Big East All-Academic Football Team for the third consecutive season. In his senior season, Shanahan had 62 receptions, 983 receiving yards, and six receiving touchdowns. He was selected to the second-team All-Big East team following the conclusion of the season. He was selected to the Big East All-Academic Football Team for the fourth consecutive season.

== Professional career ==
=== New York Jets ===
On April 27, 2013, he signed with the New York Jets as an undrafted free agent. He was released on August 22, 2013.

=== Tampa Bay Buccaneers ===
On August 26, 2013, Shanahan signed with the Tampa Bay Buccaneers. On August 27, 2013, he was waived by the Buccaneers.

== Coaching career ==
Shanahan began his coaching career at Pittsburgh in 2014 as a volunteer assistant before being promoted to graduate assistant in 2015. He went on to coach at IUP and Elon as a wide receivers coach under Curt Cignetti.

Shanahan joined Cignetti once again, this time at James Madison in 2018 as wide receivers coach and recruiting coordinator. He was promoted to offensive coordinator in 2021.

Following the 2023 season, Cignetti was hired as the new head football coach of the Indiana Hoosiers. It was soon after reported that Shanahan would follow as the offensive coordinator for the Hoosiers.
