= College transfer =

Practice in education

College transfer refers to the process by which students in postsecondary education move from attending one institution at that level to another institution at that level. It does not normally refer to the process by which students in secondary education seek access to postsecondary education. College admissions encompasses the processes by which secondary education students (who have not attended college before) and transfer students (already attending college elsewhere) pursue admission to a particular postsecondary institution.

== Overview ==
Student movements between different education providers at the postsecondary level cover a vast range of possibilities. College transfer covers the exploratory effort, self-assessment and enrollment steps students take considering their prior learning credentials — which could include their coursework grades, recommendation letters, and examinations reflecting their prior learning investment and efforts. The application, applicability and articulation of prior course credits from one college or university to another culminates in a student's transfer and enrollment in a program of study, aspiring to complete a college level credential. The assessment of prior learning and the articulation of credit offered to a prospective student varies based upon institutional practices and the enforcement of government policies enacted through legislative or negotiated rules.

College transfer also describes the general institutional support services including the academic, enrollment and advising required to help steer students through the complexity of changing institutions or programs of study and to help them understand the impact on requirements for degree completion. During the 20th century, several countries experimented with expanding the availability of lower-division college-level coursework at institutions like junior colleges, community colleges, and CEGEPs, but in turn, many first-generation college students who thereby prove themselves capable of completing such courses must then transfer to another institution to finish earning a bachelor's degree. Other students discover their true passion after they enter their first college but then discover that the college they are attending is not a leader in the field in which they wish to specialize, or they drop out of that college and then find their true passion at their first job, and either way they realize they will need to transfer their credits somewhere else that offers superior instruction in their chosen career. Certain students who were mediocre at the secondary school level or were unable to afford expensive tuition often blossom at the postsecondary level and wish to complete their bachelor's degrees at more prestigious institutions. As a result of all these trends, college transfer is increasingly the new normal for the majority of students in some countries.

== Background ==
According to the National Center for Education Statistics (NCES), in 2005 nearly 60% of college graduates in the United States who completed undergraduate degrees had attended two or more institutions prior to graduation. In the United States, roughly 2.5 million students explore college transfer which may involve re-entry from the workforce as students stop and start along their degree pathway. Student mobility spans institutions and regions, differing policies and practices often extending college degree completion by an average of one semester according to the GAO in a report to Congress in October 2005.

Rising student mobility is not just in the United States. By mid-2010, 2.2 million students will have experienced what it means to do an ERASMUS term in one of more than 4,000 higher education institutions in 33 participating countries. These include all the EU Member States as well as Iceland, Liechtenstein, Norway, Turkey, Switzerland and North Macedonia. The Erasmus Programme (European Community Action Scheme for the Mobility of University Students), a.k.a. Erasmus Project is a European Union (EU) student exchange programme established in 1987. It forms a major part of the EU Lifelong Learning Programme 2007–2013, and is the operational framework for the European Commission's initiatives in higher education.

== Criticism ==
Typically, the application deadline is March 1, and undergraduate institutions will often respond to the applicants within a few months at a time later than normal freshman college acceptances. The Common Application questions focus on the student's motivation to switch to a different university, in addition to college specific questions, rather than emphasizing high school senior's personal statements. Although this decision is incredibly important, the time between receiving acceptances and notifying the institutions of one's plans is very slim.

== Notable transfers ==
- Warren Buffett: University of Pennsylvania to University of Nebraska
- Jimmy Carter: Georgia Southwestern College to Georgia School of Technology
- Stephen Colbert: Hampden–Sydney College to Northwestern University
- Bradley Cooper: Villanova University to Georgetown University
- Ruth Bader Ginsburg: Harvard Law School to Columbia Law School
- Tom Hanks: Chabot College to California State University, Sacramento
- Charles Evans Hughes: Colgate University to Brown University
- John F. Kennedy: Princeton University to Harvard College
- Lucy Liu: New York University to University of Michigan
- George Lucas: Modesto Junior College to University of Southern California
- Barack Obama: Occidental College to Columbia University
- Mitt Romney: Stanford University to Brigham Young University
- Bernie Sanders: Brooklyn College to University of Chicago
- Donald Trump: Fordham University to University of Pennsylvania
- Rainn Wilson: Tufts University to University of Washington
- Woodrow Wilson: Davidson College to Princeton University
- Antonio Villaraigosa: East Los Angeles College to University of California, Los Angeles

== See also ==
- Transfer admissions in the United States
- NCAA transfer portal, a mechanism for facilitating transfers of student-athletes
