= 2026 Michigan Wolverines football team =

American college football season

2026 Michigan Wolverines football
- Conference: Big Ten Conference
- Record: 6–5 (3–5 Big Ten)
- Head coach: Kyle Whittingham (1st season)
- Offensive coordinator: Jason Beck (1st season; games 1–9, fired Nov. 8); Jim Harding (interim; games 10–12)
- Offensive scheme: Power spread
- Defensive coordinator: Jay Hill (1st season)
- Base defense: 4–2–5
- Captains: Rod Moore; Jordan Marshall; Trey Pierce; Bryce Underwood
- Home stadium: Michigan Stadium

Uniform
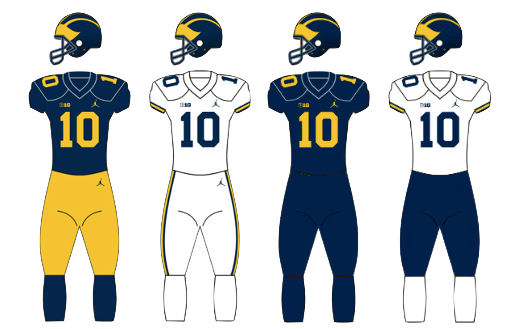

2026 Big Ten Conference football standings
	Conf.			Overall
Team	W		L	W		L
No. 4 UCLA	7	–	1	10	–	1
No. 8 Indiana	6	–	2	9	–	2
No. 15 Iowa	6	–	2	9	–	2
No. 13 Oregon	6	–	2	8	–	3
No. 18 USC	5	–	3	8	–	3
No. 14 Ohio State	5	–	3	7	–	4
Wisconsin	5	–	3	7	–	4
Nebraska	4	–	4	7	–	4
Washington	4	–	4	7	–	4
Illinois	4	–	4	6	–	5
Minnesota	4	–	4	6	–	5
Michigan	3	–	5	6	–	5
Northwestern	3	–	5	6	–	5
Penn State	3	–	5	6	–	5
Maryland	2	–	6	4	–	7
Purdue	2	–	6	3	–	8
Rutgers	2	–	6	3	–	8
Michigan State	1	–	7	3	–	8
Championship: December 5, 2026
^ – College Football Playoff participant; $ – Conference champion; y – Championship game participant; As of November 22, 2026; Rankings from CFP rankings

The 2026 Michigan Wolverines football team represents the University of Michigan as a member of the Big Ten Conference in the 2026 NCAA Division I FBS football season. The Wolverines play their home games at Michigan Stadium in Ann Arbor, Michigan, and are led by first-year head coach Kyle Whittingham.

== Schedule ==
Date	Time	Opponent	Rank	Site	TV	Result	Attendance	Source
September 5	7:30 p.m.	Western Michigan*	No. 16	Michigan Stadium; Ann Arbor, MI	NBC	W 13–12	110,879	
September 12	12:00 p.m.	No. 11 Oklahoma*		Michigan Stadium; Ann Arbor, MI (Big Noon Kickoff)	FOX	W 17–10	111,240	
September 19	3:30 p.m.	UTEP*	No. 19	Michigan Stadium; Ann Arbor, MI	BTN	W 52–17	110,668	
September 26	3:30 p.m.	No. 17 Iowa	No. 18	Michigan Stadium; Ann Arbor, MI	CBS	L 19–20	111,126	
October 3	12:00 p.m.	at Minnesota		Huntington Bank Stadium; Minneapolis, MN (Little Brown Jug, Big Noon Kickoff)	FOX	L 14–20	51,012	
October 17	3:30 p.m.	Penn State^{†}		Michigan Stadium; Ann Arbor, MI (rivalry)	CBS	W 21–18	110,731	
October 24	12:00 p.m.	No. 6 Indiana		Michigan Stadium; Ann Arbor, MI (Big Noon Kickoff)	FOX	L 6–13 ^{OT}	111,276	
October 31	12:30 p.m.	at Rutgers		SHI Stadium; Piscataway, NJ	BTN	W 28–21	39,540	
November 7	7:30 p.m.	Michigan State		Michigan Stadium; Ann Arbor, MI (rivalry)	Peacock	L 6–15	111,172	
November 14	3:30 p.m.	at No. 16 Oregon		Autzen Stadium; Eugene, OR	FOX/FS1	L 7–31	58,183	
November 21	3:30 p.m.	No. 4 UCLA		Michigan Stadium; Ann Arbor, MI	CBS	W 18–16 ^{3OT}	109,618	
November 28	12:00 p.m.	at Ohio State		Ohio Stadium; Columbus, OH (rivalry, Big Noon Kickoff)	FOX			
*Non-conference game; ^{†}Homecoming; Rankings from AP Poll (and CFP Rankings, after November 3) - Released prior to game; All times are in Eastern time; Source:

== Rankings ==
Ranking movements Legend: ██ Increase in ranking ██ Decrease in ranking — = Not ranked RV = Received votes
	Week															
Poll	Pre	1	2	3	4	5	6	7	8	9	10	11	12	13	14	Final
AP	16	RV	19	18	RV	—	—	—	—	—	—	—				
Coaches	16	24	19	18	24	—	—	RV	RV	—	—	—				
CFP	Not released									—	—	—				Not released

== Game summaries ==
=== vs Western Michigan ===
Western Michigan Broncos (0–0) at No. 16 Michigan Wolverines (0–0) – Game summary

Quarter	1	2	3	4	Total
Broncos	3	3	0	6	12
No. 16 Wolverines	7	0	0	6	13

at Michigan Stadium • Ann Arbor, Michigan

- Date: September 5
- Game time: 7:30 p.m. EDT
- Game weather: 70 °F (21 °C), cloudy, E 5 miles per hour (8.0 km/h)
- Game attendance: 110,879
- Referee: Jim Wharrie
- TV announcers (NBC): Noah Eagle (play-by-play), Todd Blackledge (analyst), and Kathryn Tappen (sideline)

Game information

First quarter

- (9:40) MICH – Bryce Underwood 1-yard run, Trey Butkowski kick (Drive: 11 plays, 75 yards, 5:20; Michigan 7–0)
- (5:17) WMU – Dieter Kelly 52-yard field goal (Drive: 8 plays, 42 yards, 4:23; Michigan 7–3)

Second quarter

- (0:00) WMU – Dieter Kelly 45-yard field goal (Drive: 2 plays, -1 yards, 0:09; Michigan 7–6)

Third quarter

- No scoring plays

Fourth quarter

- (10:25) WMU – Dieter Kelly 39-yard field goal (Drive: 20 plays, 71 yards, 13:40; Western Michigan 9–7)
- (0:35) WMU – Dieter Kelly 33-yard field goal (Drive: 5 plays, 17 yards, 1:15; Western Michigan 12–7)
- (0:00) MICH – JJ Buchanan 47-yard pass from Bryce Underwood (Drive: 6 plays, 75 yards, 0:35; Michigan 13–12)

Michigan entered the season ranked No. 16 in both the AP poll and the Coaches Poll. On September 5, Michigan opened its season with a 13–12 victory over Western Michigan before a crowd of 110,879 at Michigan Stadium. Michigan opened the scoring in the first quarter via a one-yard touchdown run from Bryce Underwood. Western Michigan responded with a 52-yard field goal by Dieter Kelly. Western Michigan scored the only points of the second quarter via a 45-yard field goal by Kelly as time expired in the half. Michigan led, 7–6, at halftime. After a scoreless third quarter, Western Michigan scored six points in the fourth quarter via two field goals by Kelly from 39 yards and 33 yards respectively, giving them the lead. With nine seconds left on the game clock, Michigan attempted a Hail Mary pass that was caught out of bounds by Western Michigan safety Micah Davis as time initially expired. However, in a controversial review, the officials added one second back on the game clock, and Michigan completed a 47-yard Hail Mary pass from Underwood to JJ Buchanan to win the game. After the game, the Big Ten Conference stated that the officials' replay system showed one second remaining when Davis touched the ball after stepping out of bounds, making the play dead, despite NBC's game clock showing zero seconds at that moment. Following the game, Michigan fell out of the AP poll's top 25, establishing a record for the highest ranked team to fall out of the poll following a win since the poll expanded from 20 to 25 teams in 1989, surpassing the 2014 Nebraska Cornhuskers football team.

Statistics	WMU	MICH
First downs	16	12
Plays–yards	67–221	48–276
Rushes–yards	46–132	25–106
Passing yards	89	170
Passing: comp–att–int	15–21–0	12–23–1
Turnovers	0	3
Time of possession	40:08	19:52

Team	Category	Player	Statistics
Western Michigan	Passing	Broc Lowry	15/21, 89 yards
Western Michigan	Rushing	Jalen Buckley	19 carries, 62 yards
Western Michigan	Receiving	Aveion Chenault	6 receptions, 53 yards
Michigan	Passing	Bryce Underwood	12/22, 170 yards, TD, INT
Michigan	Rushing	Bryce Underwood	9 carries, 47 yards, TD
Michigan	Receiving	JJ Buchanan	6 receptions, 126 yards, TD

=== vs No. 11 Oklahoma ===
No. 11 Oklahoma Sooners (1–0) at Michigan Wolverines (1–0) – Game summary

Quarter	1	2	3	4	Total
No. 11 Sooners	0	0	7	3	10
Wolverines	7	3	0	7	17

at Michigan Stadium • Ann Arbor, Michigan

- Date: September 12
- Game time: 12:00 p.m. EDT
- Game weather: 75 °F (24 °C), sunny, SW 8 miles per hour (13 km/h)
- Game attendance: 111,240
- Referee: Daniel Gautreaux
- TV announcers (FOX): Gus Johnson (play-by-play), Joel Klatt (analyst), and Jenny Taft (sideline)

Game information

First quarter

- (0:47) MICH ― Bryce Underwood 38-yard run, Trey Butkowski kick (Drive: 6 plays, 91 yards, 3:40; Michigan 7–0)

Second quarter

- (2:28) MICH ― Trey Butkowski 40-yard field goal (Drive: 11 plays, 34 yards, 5:08; Michigan 10–0)

Third quarter

- (8:30) OU ― Mackenzie Alleyne 22-yard pass from John Mateer, Tate Sandell kick (Drive: 8 plays, 90 yards, 5:01; Michigan 10–7)

Fourth quarter

- (11:49) OU ― Tate Sandell 34-yard field goal (Drive: 8 plays, 83 yards, 4:33; Tied 10–10)
- (7:53) MICH ― Jordan Marshall 1-yard run, Trey Butkowski kick (Drive: 2 plays, 6 yards, 0:47 Michigan 17–10)

On September 12, Michigan defeated No. 11 Oklahoma, 17–10, before a crowd of 111,240 at Michigan Stadium. On its first possession, Michigan drove into Oklhoma territory on a 15-yard run by Andrew Marsh and a 12-yard pass from Bryce Underwood to JJ Buchanan, but a holding penalty stopped the drive. On its second possession, Michigan drove 91 yards, including a 36-yard pass from Underwood to Buchanan and ending with a 38-yard touchdown run by Underwood. Late in the second quarter, Michigan drove 34 yards to the Oklahoma 22-yard line, and Trey Butowski converted a 40-yard field goal. Michigan led 10–0, at halftime.

On its first drive of the second half, Oklahoma drove 90 yards as quarterback John Mateer completed four passes, culminating in a 22-yard touchdown pass to Mackenzie Alleyne. On its second possession of the second half, Oklahoma started at its one-yard line after a perfect punt by Cam Brown and drove 83 yards, tying the score on a 34-yard field goal by Tate Sandell. On Oklahoma's third drive of the second half, and with With 8:49 remaining in the game, Jyaire Hill intercepted a Mateer pass and returned it 24 yards to the Oklahoma six-yard line. Following the interception, Jordan Marshall scored on a one-yard run to put the Wolverines ahead, 17–10.

Michigan's defense held Oklahoma to 115 yards of total offense in the first half, with no red-zone attempts and no points. Michigan's defense also limited Oklahoma to 3-of-13 on third down, including 1-of-5 in the first half. The Wolverines won their 46th consecutive game after leading at halftime, the longest streak in the FBS, and improved to 33–0 after holding an opponent scoreless in the first half (since 2014). The win was Michigan's first at home against a ranked opponent since defeating No. 11 USC in 2024.

Statistics	OU	MICH
First downs	17	14
Plays–yards	62–289	58–263
Rushes–yards	29–100	41–152
Passing yards	189	111
Passing: comp–att–int	17–33–1	9–17–0
Turnovers	2	0
Time of possession	26:43	33:17

Team	Category	Player	Statistics
Oklahoma	Passing	John Mateer	17/33, 189 yards, TD, INT
Oklahoma	Rushing	John Mateer	13 carries, 45 yards
Oklahoma	Receiving	Rocky Beers	6 receptions, 94 yards
Michigan	Passing	Bryce Underwood	9/17, 111 yards
Michigan	Rushing	Bryce Underwood	18 carries, 87 yards, TD
Michigan	Receiving	JJ Buchanan	2 receptions, 48 yards

=== vs UTEP ===
UTEP Miners (1–1) at No. 19 Michigan Wolverines (2–0) – Game summary

Quarter	1	2	3	4	Total
Miners	7	7	0	3	17
No. 19 Wolverines	0	17	28	7	52

at Michigan Stadium • Ann Arbor, Michigan

- Date: September 19
- Game time: 3:30 p.m. EDT
- Game weather: 60 °F (16 °C), rain, SE 8 miles per hour (13 km/h)
- Game attendance: 110,668
- Referee: Matthew Richards
- TV announcers (BTN): Jeff Levering (play-by-play), Jake Butt (analyst), and Brooke Fletcher (sideline)

Game information

First quarter

- (6:51) UTEP ― Carver Cheeks 45-yard pass from EJ Colson, Carlos Arreola kick (Drive: 5 plays, 73 yards, 3:14; UTEP 7–0)

Second quarter

- (10:34) MICH ― Savion Hiter 6-yard run, Trey Butkowski kick (Drive: 12 plays, 68 yards, 5:48; Tied 7–7)
- (5:58) UTEP ― Lamar Sperling 18-yard pass from EJ Colson, Carlos Arreola kick (Drive: 1 play, 18 yards, 0:07; UTEP 14–7)
- (1:31) MICH ― JJ Buchanan 21-yard pass from Bryce Underwood, Trey Butkowski kick (Drive: 10 plays, 75 yards, 4:27; Tied 14–14)
- (0:00) MICH ― Trey Butkowski 49-yard field goal (Drive: 5 plays, 18 yards, 0:29; Michigan 17–14)

Third quarter

- (10:03) MICH ― Jordan Marshall 6-yard run, Trey Butkowski kick (Drive: 6 plays, 52 yards, 2:41; Michigan 24–14)
- (5:25) MICH ― Savion Hiter 8-yard run, Trey Butkowski kick (Drive: 8 plays, 46 yards, 3:19; Michigan 31–14)
- (1:18) MICH ― Andrew Marsh 34-yard pass from Bryce Underwood, Trey Butkowski kick (Drive: 5 plays, 62 yards, 1:33; Michigan 38–14)
- (0:00) MICH ― Jonah Lea'ea 9-yard interception, Trey Butkowski kick (Michigan 45–14)

Fourth quarter

- (8:11) UTEP ― Carlos Arreola 39-yard field goal (Drive: 12 plays, 36 yards, 6:41; Michigan 45–17)
- (3:44) MICH ― Salesi Moa 19-yard pass from Tommy Carr, Trey Butkowski kick (Drive: 8 plays, 51 yards, 4:26; Michigan 52–17)

On September 19, Michigan defeated UTEP 52–17, before a crowd of 110,668 at Michigan Stadium. UTEP opened the scoring in the first quarter via a 45-yard touchdown pass from EJ Colson to Carver Cheeks following a Michigan turnover. Michigan finally got on the board in the second quarter via a six-yard touchdown run by Savion Hiter to tie the game. UTEP regained the lead via an 18-yard touchdown pass from Colson to Lamar Sperling. Michigan responded with ten unanswered points in the quarter via a 21-yard touchdown pass from Bryce Underwood to JJ Buchanan and a 49-yard field goal by Trey Butkowski. Michigan led 17–14 at halftime. Michigan scored 28 points in the third quarter via a six-yard touchdown run by Jordan Marshall, an eight-yard touchdown run by Hiter, a 34-yard touchdown pass from Underwood to Andrew Marsh and a nine-yard interception return by Jonah Lea'ea as time expired in the quarter. This was Michigan's first pick-six since Will Johnson on September 21, 2024 against USC. UTEP scored their only points of the second-half via a 39-yard field goal by Carlos Arreola. Michigan scored the final points of the game late in the quarter via a 19-yard touchdown pass from Tommy Carr to Salesi Moa. This marked freshman Carr's first career collegiate appearance and first career touchdown. UTEP converted on just two of their 12 third-down attempts, forcing them to punt six times. Michigan's defense outscored UTEP's offense in the second half.

Offensively, Michigan scored a season-high 52 points, totaled 431 yards of offense and converted 9-of-13 third-down attempts and both of its fourth-down tries. Michigan's 28 points in the third quarter were its most in the quarter since scoring 28 against Rutgers on November 5, 2022.

Statistics	UTEP	MICH
First downs	9	27
Plays–yards	43–150	71–431
Rushes–yards	32–57	42–185
Passing yards	93	246
Passing: comp–att–int	10–15–1	21–28–0
Time of possession	28:22	31:38

Team	Category	Player	Statistics
UTEP	Passing	EJ Colson	7/9, 86 yards, 2 TD, INT
UTEP	Rushing	Tavorus Jones	9 carries, 34 yards
UTEP	Receiving	Carver Cheeks	1 reception, 45 yards, TD
Michigan	Passing	Bryce Underwood	19/25, 223 yards, 2 TD
Michigan	Rushing	Savion Hiter	11 carries, 62 yards, 2 TD
Michigan	Receiving	Andrew Marsh	10 receptions, 105 yards, TD

=== vs No. 17 Iowa ===
No. 17 Iowa Hawkeyes (3–0) at No. 18 Michigan Wolverines (3–0) – Game summary

Quarter	1	2	3	4	Total
No. 17 Hawkeyes	7	0	0	13	20
No. 18 Wolverines	7	3	3	6	19

at Michigan Stadium • Ann Arbor, Michigan

- Date: September 26
- Game time: 3:30 p.m. EDT
- Game weather: 70 °F (21 °C), sunny, NW 7 miles per hour (11 km/h)
- Game attendance: 111,126
- Referee: Chris Coyte
- TV announcers (CBS): Brad Nessler (play-by-play), Charles Davis (analyst), and Jenny Dell (sideline)

Game information

First quarter

- (1:58) MICH ― JJ Buchanan 21-yard pass from Bryce Underwood, Trey Butkowski kick (Drive: 9 plays, 89 yards, 3:58; Michigan 7–0)
- (1:44) IOWA ― Braeden Jackson 99-yard kickoff return, Caden Buhr kick (Tied 7–7)

Second quarter

- (12:58) MICH ― Trey Butkowski 41-yard field goal (Drive: 8 plays, 59 yards, 3:43; Michigan 10–7)

Third quarter

- (1:29) MICH ― Trey Butkowski 22-yard field goal (Drive: 11 plays, 43 yards, 5:44; Michigan 13–7)

Fourth quarter

- (14:02) IOWA ― Reece Vander Zee 16-yard pass from Hank Brown, Caden Buhr kick (Drive: 7 plays, 75 yards, 2:27; Iowa 14–13)
- (11:59) MICH ― JJ Buchanan 49-yard pass from Bryce Underwood (Drive: 6 plays, 75 yards, 2:03; Michigan 19–14)
- (0:00) IOWA ― Reece Vander Zee 16-yard pass from Hank Brown (Drive: 11 plays, 91 yards, 1:46; Iowa 20–19)

On September 26, Michigan lost to No. 17 Iowa, 20–19, before a crowd of 111,126 at Michigan Stadium. Michigan opened the scoring in the first quarter via a 21-yard touchdown pass from Bryce Underwood to JJ Buchanan. Iowa responded with a 99-yard kickoff return by Braeden Jackson to tie the game. Michigan scored the only points of the second quarter via a 41-yard field goal by Trey Butkowski, making the score 10–7 in favor of Michigan at halftime. Michigan extended their lead in the third quarter via a 22-yard field goal by Butkowski. Iowa took their first lead of the game in the fourth quarter via a 16-yard touchdown pass from Hank Brown to Reece Vander Zee. Michigan responded with a 49-yard touchdown pass from Underwood to Buchanan to regain the lead. During the final play of the game, Iowa scored via a 16-yard touchdown pass from Brown to Vander Zee as time expired to win the game.

Bryce Underwood recorded a career-high 276 passing yards, completing 17-of-28 passes. Two Wolverine receivers surpassed 100 yards, as Andrew Marsh recorded seven passes for 106 yards and JJ Buchanan recorded five for a career-high 130 yards. This was the first time two Michigan receivers surpassed 100 yards since December 31, 2022, against TCU. Michigan's defense held Iowa to 77 yards and five first downs in the first half. Iowa finished with 58 rushing yards, its fewest in a game since recording 49 against Nebraska in 2024.

Statistics	IOWA	MICH
First downs	16	21
Plays–yards	59–285	68–429
Rushes–yards	24–58	40–143
Passing yards	227	276
Passing: comp–att–int	21–35–0	17–28–1
Time of possession	25:31	34:29

Team	Category	Player	Statistics
Iowa	Passing	Hank Brown	21/35, 227 yards, 2 TD
Iowa	Rushing	Kamari Moulton	13 carries, 44 yards
Iowa	Receiving	Reece Vander Zee	5 receptions, 66 yards, 2 TD
Michigan	Passing	Bryce Underwood	17/28, 276 yards, 2 TD, INT
Michigan	Rushing	Jordan Marshall	11 carries, 59 yards
Michigan	Receiving	JJ Buchanan	5 receptions, 130 yards, 2 TD

=== at Minnesota ===
Michigan Wolverines (3–1) at Minnesota Golden Gophers (3–1) – Game summary

Quarter	1	2	3	4	Total
Wolverines	0	14	0	0	14
Golden Gophers	7	0	3	10	20

at Huntington Bank Stadium • Minneapolis, Minnesota

- Date: October 3
- Game time: 12:00 p.m. EDT
- Game weather: 60 °F (16 °C), sunny, NW 13 miles per hour (21 km/h)
- Game attendance: 51,012
- Referee: Francisco Villar
- TV announcers (FOX): Gus Johnson (play-by-play), Joel Klatt (analyst), and Jenny Taft (sideline)

Game information

First quarter

- (7:29) MIN ― Darius Taylor 2-yard run, Luke Drzewiecki kick (Drive: 7 plays, 80 yards, 4:26; Minnesota 7–0)

Second quarter

- (13:46) MICH ― Jordan Marshall 5-yard run, Trey Butkowski kick (Drive: 5 plays, 34 yards, 2:02; Tied 7–7)
- (2:48) MICH ― Nathaniel Staehling 79-yard interception, Trey Butkowski kick (Michigan 14–7)

Third quarter

- (5:46) MIN ― Luke Drzewiecki 31-yard field goal (Drive: 4 plays, 4 yards, 1:36; Michigan 14–10)

Fourth quarter

- (14:58) MIN ― Luke Drzewiecki 26-yard field goal (Drive: 8 plays, 34 yards, 5:01; Michigan 14–13)
- (13:44) MIN ― Darius Taylor 3-yard pass from Drake Lindsey, Luke Drzewiecki kick (Drive: 3 plays, 35 yards, 1:07; Minnesota 20–14)

On October 3, Michigan lost to Minnesota, 20–14, before a crowd of 51,012 at Huntington Bank Stadium. Minnesota opened the scoring in the first quarter via a two-yard touchdown run by Darius Taylor. Michigan finally got on the board in the second quarter via a five-yard touchdown run by Jordan Marshall to tie the game. Michigan scored the final points of the half via a 79-yard interception return by Nathaniel Staehling, making the score 14–7 in favor of Michigan at halftime. Michigan was held scoreless in the second half, as Minnesota controlled possession, holding the ball for more than twice as long as Michigan. Minnesota scored the only points of the third quarter via a 31-yard field goal by Luke Drzewiecki. Minnesota scored ten points in the fourth quarter, first a 26-yard field goal by Drzewiecki, then a three-yard touchdown pass from Drake Lindsey to Taylor. The Wolverines turned the ball over three times after halftime on a muffed punt and two interceptions and were forced to punt six times in the game. The loss marked Michigan's first road loss to Minnesota since 1977.

Defensive end Lugard Edokpayi Jr. tipped a punt in the second quarter. This was Michigan's first blocked or tipped punt of the season and the first since Michigan blocked a punt against Purdue on November 1, 2025.

Statistics	MICH	MINN
First downs	11	17
Plays–yards	49–180	65–262
Rushes–yards	28–79	40–126
Passing yards	101	136
Passing: comp–att–int	10–21–2	17–25–2
Time of possession	22:24	37:36

Team	Category	Player	Statistics
Michigan	Passing	Bryce Underwood	10/21, 101 yards, 2 INT
Michigan	Rushing	Jordan Marshall	10 carries, 50 yards, TD
Michigan	Receiving	JJ Buchanan	4 receptions, 50 yards
Minnesota	Passing	Drake Lindsey	17/25, 136 yards, TD, 2 INT
Minnesota	Rushing	TJ Thomas	12 carries, 56 yards
Minnesota	Receiving	Noah Jennings	7 receptions, 70 yards

=== vs Penn State ===
Penn State Nittany Lions (3–3) at Michigan Wolverines (3–2) – Game summary

Quarter	1	2	3	4	Total
Nittany Lions	3	0	0	15	18
Wolverines	0	0	14	7	21

at Michigan Stadium • Ann Arbor, Michigan

- Date: October 17
- Game time: 3:30 p.m. EDT
- Game weather: 50 °F (10 °C), sunny, W 5 miles per hour (8.0 km/h)
- Game attendance: 110,731
- Referee: Tim Odey
- TV announcers (CBS): Brad Nessler (play-by-play), Charles Davis (analyst), and Jenny Dell (sideline)

Game information

First quarter

- (5:58) PSU ― Ryan Barker 24-yard field goal (Drive: 16 plays, 69 yards, 9:02; Penn State 3–0)

Second quarter

- No scoring plays

Third quarter

- (11:58) MICH ― Bryson Kuzdzal 43-yard run, Trey Butkowski kick (Drive: 2 plays, 43 yards, 0:15; Michigan 7–3)
- (2:14) MICH ― Jordan Marshall 1-yard run, Trey Butkowski kick (Drive: 11 plays, 74 yards, 6:06; Michigan 14–3)

Fourth quarter

- (11:40) PSU ― Carson Hansen 2-yard run, Rocco Becht–Benjamin Brahmer pass (Drive: 12 plays, 75 yards, 5:34; Michigan 14–11)
- (2:58) MICH ― Tommy Carr 12-yard run, Trey Butkowski kick (Drive: 3 plays, 13 yards, 2:04; Michigan 21–11)
- (1:11) PSU ― Chase Sowell 24-yard pass from Rocco Becht, Ryan Barker kick (Drive: 11 plays, 73 yards, 1:40; Michigan 21–18)

On October 17, Michigan defeated Penn State 21–18, before a crowd of 110,731 at Michigan Stadium. Penn State opened the scoring in the first quarter via a 24-yard field goal by Ryan Barker. After a scoreless second quarter, Penn State led 3–0 at halftime. After throwing two interceptions in the first-half, quarterback Bryce Underwood was benched in favor of freshman Tommy Carr. Michigan scored 14 points in the third quarter. Rod Moore intercepted his eighth career pass and first of the season on Penn State's first pass attempt of the second half. The interception led to Michigan scoring their first points of the game via a 43-yard touchdown run by Bryson Kuzdzal. On the next Penn State drive, Chris Bracy recorded his first interception of the season, and the third pick of his career. Michigan once again capitalized on the turnover, capping off a 74-yard drive with a one-yard touchdown run by Jordan Marshall. In the fourth quarter, Penn State reduced Michigan's lead to three points following a two-yard touchdown run by Carson Hansen and a two-point conversion pass from Rocco Becht to Benjamin Brahmer. Bracy recorded the first sack of his Michigan career that forced a fumble recovered by Enow Etta and led to a 12-yard touchdown run by Tommy Carr. Penn State scored the final points of the game via a 24-yard touchdown pass from Becht to Chase Sowell.

Michigan's defense held Penn State to 65 rushing yards, its second-lowest rushing total of the season. Kuzdzal, Marshall and Carr scored rushing touchdowns, marking the first time three Michigan players scored rushing touchdowns in the same game since Justice Haynes, Bryce Underwood and Marshall combined for four touchdowns against Michigan State on October 25, 2025. Michigan finished with 301 yards of total offense, including 211 rushing yards. This marked the first time since November 22, 2025 against Maryland that the Wolverines rushed for more than 200 yards.

Statistics	PSU	MICH
First downs	22	15
Plays–yards	74–332	53–301
Rushes–yards	30–65	35–211
Passing yards	267	90
Passing: comp–att–int	28–44–2	10–18–2
Time of possession	32:02	27:58

Team	Category	Player	Statistics
Penn State	Passing	Rocco Becht	28/44, 267 yards, TD, 2 INT
Penn State	Rushing	Carson Hansen	15 carries, 51 yards, TD
Penn State	Receiving	Chase Sowell	11 receptions, 151 yards, TD
Michigan	Passing	Tommy Carr	5/7, 47 yards, TD
Michigan	Rushing	Savion Hiter	11 carries, 78 yards
Michigan	Receiving	JJ Buchanan	3 receptions, 36 yards

=== vs No. 6 Indiana ===
No. 6 Indiana Hoosiers (6–1) at Michigan Wolverines (4–2) – Game summary

Quarter	1	2	3	4	OT	Total
No. 6 Hoosiers	3	3	0	0	7	13
Wolverines	0	0	3	3	0	6

at Michigan Stadium • Ann Arbor, Michigan

- Date: October 24
- Game time: 12:00 p.m. EDT
- Game weather: 54 °F (12 °C), sunny, SE 5 miles per hour (8.0 km/h)
- Game attendance: 111,276
- Referee: Mark Klucznski
- TV announcers (FOX): Gus Johnson (play-by-play), Joel Klatt (analyst), and Jenny Taft (sideline)

Game information

First quarter

- (3:44) IU ― Nico Radicic 24-yard field goal (Drive: 7 plays, 24 yards, 2:48; Indiana 3–0)

Second quarter

- (9:31) IU ― Nico Radicic 34-yard field goal (Drive: 4 plays, 5 yards, 1:57; Indiana 6–0)

Third quarter

- (2:22) MICH ― Trey Butkowski 29-yard field goal (Drive: 4 plays, 2 yards, 1:26; Indiana 6–3)

Fourth quarter

- (0:00) MICH ― Trey Butkowski 26-yard field goal (Drive: 13 plays, 53 yards, 7:32; Tied 6–6)

Overtime

- (0:00) IU ― Josh Hoover 4-yard run, Nico Radicic kick (Drive: 2 plays, 25 yards, 0:00; Indiana 13–6)

On October 24, Michigan lost to No. 6 Indiana, 13–6, in overtime before a crowd of 111,276 at Michigan Stadium. Indiana opened the scoring in the first quarter on a 24-yard field goal by Nico Radicic. Indiana extended its lead in the second quarter on a 34-yard field goal by Radicic, making the score, 6–0, at halftime. Michigan scored in the third quarter on a 29-yard field goal by Trey Butkowski. After trailing for most of the game, Michigan ran down the final 7:32 of game time, ending with a 26-yard field goal by Butkowski as time expired to tie the score and send the game to overtime. During overtime, Indiana scored on their first possession on a four-yard touchdown run from Josh Hoover. On Michigan's ensuing possession Tommy Carr's fourth down pass attempt was incomplete to Salesi Moa, turning the ball over on downs. This was Indiana's first win in Ann Arbor since 1967.

Michigan held Indiana to 81 passing yards. Indiana entered the game averaging 249.1 passing yards per game. This marked the first time the Hoosiers failed to surpass 100 passing yards since November 23, 2024. Zeke Berry broke up a third-down pass attempt in the second quarter, the 25th pass breakup of his career, to move into the top ten all-time at Michigan in career pass breakups. Freshman quarterback Tommy Carr made his first career start and became the sixth true-freshman quarterback to start for Michigan, following Bryce Underwood (2025), Tate Forcier (2009), Chad Henne (2004), Rich Hewlett (1979) and Rick Leach (1975).

Statistics	IU	MICH
First downs	11	16
Plays–yards	53–212	74–224
Rushes–yards	35–131	42–57
Passing yards	81	167
Passing: comp–att–int	8–18–1	20–32–1
Time of possession	26:16	33:44

Team	Category	Player	Statistics
Indiana	Passing	Josh Hoover	8/18, 81 yards, INT
Indiana	Rushing	Turbo Richard	19 carries, 68 yards
Indiana	Receiving	Charlie Becker	3 receptions, 32 yards
Michigan	Passing	Tommy Carr	20/32, 167 yards, INT
Michigan	Rushing	Jordan Marshall	12 carries, 26 yards
Michigan	Receiving	JJ Buchanan	6 receptions, 57 yards

=== at Rutgers ===
Michigan Wolverines (4–3) at Rutgers Scarlet Knights (2–5) – Game summary

Quarter	1	2	3	4	Total
Wolverines	7	7	7	7	28
Scarlet Knights	3	10	0	8	21

at SHI Stadium • Piscataway, New Jersey

- Date: October 31
- Game time: 12:30 p.m. EDT
- Game weather: 58 °F (14 °C), sunny, NW 5 miles per hour (8.0 km/h)
- Game attendance: 39,540
- Referee: Jason Nickleby
- TV announcers (BTN): Jason Horowitz (play-by-play), Jake Butt (analyst), and Brooke Fletcher (sideline)

Game information

First quarter

- (7:23) MICH ― JJ Buchanan 6-yard pass from Tommy Carr, Trey Butkowski kick (Drive: 10 plays, 92 yards, 5:52; Michigan 7–0)
- (1:46) RUT ― Dane Pizzaro 46-yard field goal (Drive: 10 plays, 47 yards, 5:37; Michigan 7–3)

Second quarter

- (13:16) MICH ― Jordan Marshall 2-yard run, Trey Butkowski kick (Drive: 8 plays, 75 yards, 3:30; Michigan 14–3)
- (11:31) RUT ― Jourdin Houston 80-yard pass from AJ Surace, Dane Pizzaro kick (Drive: 3 plays, 75 yards, 1:45; Michigan 14–10)
- (3:21) RUT ― Dane Pizzaro 32-yard field goal (Drive: 7 plays, 56 yards, 4:29; Michigan 14–13)

Third quarter

- (8:56) MICH ― Tommy Carr 15-yard run, Trey Butkowski kick (Drive: 11 plays, 75 yards, 6:04; Michigan 21–13)

Fourth quarter

- (11:43) RUT ― Clay Thevenin 1-yard run, Ben Black pass (Drive: 5 plays, 63 yards, 2:21; Tied 21–21)
- (4:24) MICH ― Tommy Carr 9-yard run, Trey Butkowski kick (Drive: 11 plays, 75 yards, 7:19; Michigan 28–21)

On October 31, Michigan defeated Rutgers, 28–21, before a crowd of 39,540 at SHI Stadium in Piscataway, New Jersey. Michigan opened the scoring in the first quarter on a six-yard touchdown pass from Tommy Carr to JJ Buchanan. Rutgers scored on a 46-yard field goal by Dane Pizzaro. Michigan extended its lead in the second quarter on a two-yard touchdown run from Jordan Marshall. Rutgers scored ten points in the quarter on an 80-yard touchdown pass from AJ Surace to Jourdin Houston and a 32-yard field goal by Pizzaro, making the score, 14–13, in favor of Michigan at halftime. Michigan scored the only points of the third quarter on a 15-yard touchdown run from Carr. Rutgers tied the game in the fourth quarter on a one-yard touchdown run from Clay Thevenin and a two-point conversion pass. Michigan scored the final points of the game on a nine-yard touchdown run from Carr.

Michigan's defense held Rutgers to 3-of-10 on third down and only nine total first downs. Michigan held Rutgers to a 25 percent pass completion percentage and did not allow a completion in the second half for the second consecutive game. Quarterback Tommy Carr completed 22 of 27 passes for 266 yards, and rushed for 54 yards on 12 carries, accounting for three touchdowns, including two rushing touchdowns. His 81 completion percentage is the highest single-game percentage by any freshman starting quarterback in Michigan history with a minimum of 20 attempts.

Statistics	MICH	RUTG
First downs	23	9
Plays–yards	72–427	38–249
Rushes–yards	45–161	26–126
Passing yards	266	123
Passing: comp–att–int	22–27–0	3–12–0
Time of possession	39:06	20:54

Team	Category	Player	Statistics
Michigan	Passing	Tommy Carr	22/27, 266 yards, TD
Michigan	Rushing	Savion Hiter	20 carries, 76 yards
Michigan	Receiving	JJ Buchanan	5 receptions, 72 yards, TD
Rutgers	Passing	AJ Surace	3/12, 123 yards, TD
Rutgers	Rushing	Antwan Raymond	11 carries, 85 yards
Rutgers	Receiving	Jourdin Houston	1 reception, 80 yards, TD

=== vs Michigan State ===
Michigan State Spartans (2–6) at Michigan Wolverines (5–3) – Game summary

Quarter	1	2	3	4	Total
Spartans	0	6	3	6	15
Wolverines	0	0	0	6	6

at Michigan Stadium • Ann Arbor, Michigan

- Date: November 7
- Game time: 7:30 p.m. EST
- Game weather: 40 °F (4 °C), cloud, W 5 miles per hour (8.0 km/h)
- Game attendance: 111,172
- Referee: Jeff Servinski
- TV announcers (Peacock/NBCSN): Paul Burmeister (play-by-play), Yogi Roth (analyst), and Lewis Johnson (sideline)

Game information

First quarter

- No scoring plays

Second quarter

- (1:33) MSU ― Liam Boyd 21-yard field goal (Drive: 10 plays, 47 yards, 3:24; Michigan State 3–0)
- (0:05) MSU ― Liam Boyd 37-yard field goal (Drive: 9 plays, 41 yards, 0:58; Michigan State 6–0)

Third quarter

- (2:12) MSU ― Liam Boyd 38-yard field goal (Drive: 17 plays, 79 yards, 10:41; Michigan State 9–0)

Fourth quarter

- (5:04) MSU ― Liam Boyd 24-yard field goal (Drive: 10 plays, 56 yards, 5:19; Michigan State 12–0)
- (4:09) MSU ― Liam Boyd 49-yard field goal (Drive: 4 plays, 6 yards, 0:21; Michigan State 15–0)
- (1:35) MICH ― Savion Hiter 1-yard run, (pass failed) (Drive: 13 plays, 75 yards, 2:34; Michigan State 15–6)

On November 7, Michigan faced their in-state rival Michigan State, in the annual battle for the Paul Bunyan Trophy. Michigan lost, 15–6, before a crowd of 111,172 at Michigan Stadium. After a scoreless first quarter, Michigan State scored six points in the second quarter on two field goals by Liam Boyd, from 21 yards, and 37 yards, respectively. Michigan State led, 6–0, at halftime. Michigan State scored the only points of the third quarter on a 38-yard field goal by Boyd. Michigan State extended their lead in the fourth quarter on two field goals by Boyd from 24 yards and 49 yards, respectively. Michigan scored with 1:35 left in the game on a one-yard touchdown run from Savion Hiter. Michigan finished the game with only 192 yards of total offense and converted on just two of their 10 third-down attempts. Michigan turned the ball over four times on two interceptions and two fumbles. Michigan only produced three drives of more than 25 yards, with only one ending in points, and the other two resulting in a fumble and a missed field goal. Following the game, on November 8, Michigan offensive coordinator Jason Beck was fired, with Jim Harding taking over as interim offensive coordinator.

With a pass breakup in the first-quarter, Zeke Berry reached 27 career pass breakups, tying Jeremy LeSueur for eighth in program history.

Statistics	MSU	MICH
First downs	17	13
Plays–yards	75–298	52–192
Rushes–yards	43–110	26–54
Passing yards	188	138
Passing: comp–att–int	21–32–0	14–26–2
Time of possession	38:07	21:53

Team	Category	Player	Statistics
Michigan State	Passing	Alessio Milivojevic	21/32, 188 yards
Michigan State	Rushing	Brandon Tullis	25 carries, 86 yards
Michigan State	Receiving	Chrishon McCray	6 receptions, 92 yards
Michigan	Passing	Tommy Carr	14/26, 138 yards, 2 INT
Michigan	Rushing	Bryson Kuzdzal	9 carries, 49 yards
Michigan	Receiving	Andrew Marsh	4 receptions, 38 yards

=== at No. 16 Oregon ===
Michigan Wolverines (5–4) at No. 16 Oregon Ducks (6–3) – Game summary

Quarter	1	2	3	4	Total
Wolverines	0	7	0	0	7
No. 16 Ducks	14	7	0	10	31

at Autzen Stadium • Eugene, Oregon

- Date: November 14
- Game time: 3:30 p.m. EST
- Game weather: 60 °F (16 °C), cloudy, SW 6 miles per hour (9.7 km/h)
- Game attendance: 58,183
- Referee: Gregory Blum
- TV announcers (FS1/FOX): Tim Brando (play-by-play), Devin Gardner (analyst), and Josh Sims (sideline)

Game information

First quarter

- (13:00) ORE ― Jeremiah McClellan 60-yard pass from Dylan Raiola, Gage Hurych kick (Drive: 4 plays, 75 yards, 2:00; Oregon 7–0)
- (0:13) ORE ― Da'Jaun Riggs 2-yard pass from Dylan Raiola, Gage Hurych kick (Drive: 10 plays, 64 yards, 5:13; Oregon 14–0)

Second quarter

- (14:49) MICH ― Savion Hiter 70-yard run, Jacob Baggett kick (Drive: 2 plays, 75 yards, 0:24; Oregon 14–7)
- (0:06) ORE ― Dakorien Moore 59-yard pass from Dylan Raiola, Gage Hurych kick (Drive: 4 plays, 91 yards, 0:52; Oregon 21–7)

Third quarter

- No scoring plays

Fourth quarter

- (4:03) ORE ― Dierre Hill 49-yard pass from Dylan Raiola, Gage Hurych kick (Drive: 3 plays, 40 yards, 1:15; Oregon 28–7)
- (0:40) ORE ― Gage Hurych 21-yard field goal (Drive: 6 plays, 18 yards, 2:06; Oregon 31–7)

On November 14, Michigan lost to No. 16 Oregon 31–7, before a crowd of 58,183 at Autzen Stadium. Oregon scored 14 points in the first quarter via a 60-yard touchdown pass from Dylan Raiola to Jeremiah McClellan, and a two-yard touchdown pass from Raiola to Da'Jaun Riggs. Michigan finally got on the board in the second quarter via a 70-yard touchdown run by Savion Hiter. Oregon responded with a 59-yard touchdown pass from Raiola to Dakorien Moore, making the score 21–7 in favor of Oregon at halftime. Michigan turned the ball over on all five of their second-half drives, including three on downs and two fumbles. After a scoreless third quarter, Oregon scored ten points in the fourth quarter via a 49-yard touchdown pass from Raiola to Dierre Hill and a 21-yard field goal by Gage Hurych.

Savion Hiter's 70-yard touchdown run was the longest touchdown run by a freshman back since Tyrone Wheatley's 74-yard touchdown against Northwestern in 1991. Hiter finished the game with 13 carries for a career-high 107 yards.

Statistics	MICH	ORE
First downs	13	18
Plays–yards	60–286	64–467
Rushes–yards	40–215	36–126
Passing yards	71	341
Passing: comp–att–int	6–20–0	20–28–0
Time of possession	29:39	30:21

Team	Category	Player	Statistics
Michigan	Passing	Tommy Carr	4/12, 45 yards
Michigan	Rushing	Savion Hiter	13 carries, 107 yards, TD
Michigan	Receiving	Andrew Marsh	4 receptions, 46 yards
Oregon	Passing	Dylan Raiola	20/28, 341 yards, 4 TD
Oregon	Rushing	Dierre Hill	21 carries, 98 yards
Oregon	Receiving	Jeremiah McClellan	4 receptions, 105 yards, TD

=== vs No. 4 UCLA ===
No. 4 UCLA Bruins (10–0) at Michigan Wolverines (5–5) – Game summary

Quarter	1	2	3	4	OT	2OT	3OT	Total
No. 4 Bruins	0	3	0	7	3	3	0	16
Wolverines	0	3	0	7	3	3	2	18

at Michigan Stadium • Ann Arbor, Michigan

- Date: November 21
- Game time: 3:30 p.m. EST
- Game weather: 62 °F (17 °C), sunny, S 6 miles per hour (9.7 km/h)
- Game attendance: 109,618
- Referee: Kole Knueppel
- TV announcers (CBS): Brad Nessler (play-by-play), Charles Davis (analyst), and Jenny Dell (sideline)

Game information

First quarter

- No scoring plays

Second quarter

- (3:08) MICH ― Jacob Baggett 46-yard field goal (Drive: 7 plays, 17 yards, 3:02; Michigan 3–0)
- (0:00) UCLA ― Mateen Bhaghani 44-yard field goal (Drive: 4 plays, 29 yards, 0:32; Tied 3–3)

Third quarter

- No scoring plays

Fourth quarter

- (12:55) MICH ― Mason Bonner 6-yard pass from Bryce Underwood, Jacob Baggett kick (Drive: 5 plays, 15 yards, 2:09; Michigan 10–3)
- (0:10) UCLA ― Brayden Loftin 1-yard pass from Anthony Woods, Mateen Bhaghani kick (Drive: 15 plays, 77 yards, 5:14; Tied 10–10)

Overtime 1

- UCLA ― Mateen Bhaghani 38-yard field goal (Drive: 4 plays, 5 yards; UCLA 13–10)
- MICH ― Jacob Baggett 29-yard field goal (Drive: 6 plays, 14 yards; Tied 13–13)

Overtime 2

- MICH ― Jacob Baggett 52-yard field goal (Drive: 4 plays, -9 yards; Michigan 16–13)
- UCLA ― Mateen Bhaghani 38-yard field goal (Drive: 4 plays, 5 yards; Tied 16–16)

Overtime 3

- MICH ― Bryce Underwood pass to Jalen Hoffman for two-point conversion (Michigan 18–16)

On November 21, Michigan defeated No. 4 UCLA 18–16. Both teams scored a field goal in the second quarter and a touchdown in the fourth quarter, causing the game to go into overtime. In the first two overtime periods, both teams struggled offensively, resulting in them kicking field goals. UCLA lost quarterback Ty Dieffenbach to a lower-body injury in the first overtime period, with quarterback Madden Iamaleava taking over. In the third overtime period, after Iamaleava failed a two-point conversion, Michigan quarterback Bryce Underwood threw the game-winning pass to tight end Jalen Hoffman, winning the game for Michigan.

Statistics	UCLA	MICH
First downs	17	14
Plays–yards	74–296	67–247
Rushes–yards	42–107	43–120
Passing yards	189	127
Passing: comp–att–int	20–32–1	11–24–0
Time of possession	30:04	29:56

Team	Category	Player	Statistics
UCLA	Passing	Ty Dieffenbach	19/30, 188 yards, INT
UCLA	Rushing	Wayne Knight	11 carries, 30 yards
UCLA	Receiving	Wayne Knight	6 receptions, 38 yards
Michigan	Passing	Bryce Underwood	11/24, 127 yards, TD
Michigan	Rushing	Savion Hiter	26 carries, 104 yards
Michigan	Receiving	Mason Bonner	3 receptions, 47 yards, TD

=== at No. 25 Ohio State ===
Michigan Wolverines (0–0) at Ohio State Buckeyes (0–0) – Game summary

Quarter	1	2	3	4	Total
Wolverines	0	0	0	0	0
No. 25 Buckeyes	0	0	0	0	0

at Ohio Stadium • Columbus, Ohio

- Date: November 28
- Game time: 12:00 p.m. EST
- TV announcers (FOX): Gus Johnson (play-by-play), Joel Klatt (color commentator), Jenny Taft, and Tom Rinaldi (sideline reporters)

Statistics	MICH	OSU
First downs		
Plays–yards		
Rushes–yards		
Passing yards		
Passing: comp–att–int		
Time of possession		

Team	Category	Player	Statistics
Michigan	Passing		
Michigan	Rushing		
Michigan	Receiving		
Ohio State	Passing		
Ohio State	Rushing		
Ohio State	Receiving		

== Personnel ==
=== Roster ===
2026 Michigan Wolverines football team roster
Players
Coaches
Offense

Pos.	#	Name	Class
WR	0	Kendrick Bell (injured)	Sr
WR	3	Andrew Marsh	So
RB	5	Savion Hiter	Fr
WR	6	JJ Buchanan (injured)	So
WR	9	Channing Goodwin	Jr
WR	10	Jaime Ffrench	So
WR	12	Salesi Moa	Fr
WR	13	Travis Johnson	Fr
QB	14	Tommy Carr	Fr
QB	15	Chase Herbstreit	So
QB	16	Brayden Fowler-Nicolosi	GS
QB	17	Brady Smigiel (injured)	Fr
TE	18	Mason Bonner	Fr
QB	19	Bryce Underwood (C)	So
WR	20	Jaylen Pile	Fr
WR	22	Braydon Alford (injured)	Jr
RB	23	Jordan Marshall (C)	Jr
RB	24	Bryson Kuzdzal	Sr
RB	25	Micah Ka'apana (injured)	Jr
RB	26	Donovan Johnson	So
RB	29	Jonathan Brown	Fr
RB	32	Gary Stacy	So
RB	36	Tomas O'Meara	Jr
WR	38	Bryce Wilcox	GS
TE	40	Jimmy Pisani	Sr
TE	42	Jalen Hoffman	Sr
TE	44	Eli Owens	So
TE	46	Crandall Quinn	Sr
OL	50	Luke Hamilton	Jr
OL	52	Ace Hamilton (injured)	Fr
OL	53	Jake Guarnera	Jr
OL	54	Andrew Sprague (injured)	Jr
OL	55	Nathan Efobi	Sr
OL	58	Malakai Lee	Fr
OL	60	Brooks Bahr	Sr
OL	64	James Kavouklis	GS
OL	65	Andrew Babalola (injured)	So
OL	66	Dan Taraboi	GS
OL	67	Houston Ka'aha'aina-Torres	So
OL	70	Brady Norton	Sr
OL	71	Evan Link	Sr
OL	72	Peter Donini	So
OL	77	Blake Frazier (injured)	Jr
OL	78	Marky Walbridge	Fr
OL	79	Tommy Fraumann	Fr
TE	80	Hogan Hansen	Jr
WR	81	Jamar Browder	So
TE	83	Zack Marshall	Sr
WR	84	Jacob Washington	So
WR	85	Logan Forbes	GS
TE	88	Deakon Tonielli	Sr
OL	89,74	Avery Gach	So
WR	89	Kaleb Schlecht	Sr
OL	96,76	Manuel Beigel	Jr

Defense

Pos.	#	Name	Class
CB	0	Jyaire Hill	Sr
S	1	Rod Moore (C)	GS
CB	2	Shamari Earls	So
CB	3	Smith Snowden	Sr
LB	4	Chase Taylor	So
S	5	Jacob Oden	Jr
S	6	Jordan Young	So
S	7	Chris Bracy	Sr
DE	8	Dominic Nichols	Jr
DE	9	Cameron Brandt	Sr
CB	10	Zeke Berry	GS
LB	12	Nathaniel Owusu-Boateng	So
LB	13	Aisea Moa	GS
DE	14	Carter Meadows	Fr
LB	15	Aden Reeder	Fr
CB	16	Jo'Ziah Edmond	Jr
DT	17	Enow Etta	Sr
LB	18	Troy Bowles	Sr
CB	20	I'Marion Stewart	Jr
S	22	Jordan Deck	Fr
LB	23	Markel Dabney	Fr
CB	24	Jamarion Vincent	Fr
S	25	Mason Curtis	Jr
CB	26	Jeremiah Earby	GS
S	27	Ernest Nunley	Fr
S	28	Kainoa Winston	So
LB	30	Max Alford	GS
S	31	Nico Andrighetto	GS
CB	32	Jeremiah Lowe	Jr
LB	33	Kaden Catchings	Fr
LB	34	John Weidenbach	Sr
LB	35	Ndi Etta	Fr
CB	36	Joshua Nichols	GS
DE	37	Julius Holly (injured)	So
CB	38	Sam Baron	Sr
S	39	Max Reyes	GS
DE	41	Tariq Boney	Fr
CB	42	Jeffrey Chukwu	Jr
LB	43	Zach Ludwig	Jr
LB	44	Nathaniel Staehling	GS
LB	49	Adam Bazzi	Jr
DE	51	McHale Blade	Fr
LB	52	Christian Pierce	So
DT	54	Deyvid Palepale	Jr
DT	56	Alister Vallejo	Fr
DT	57	Travis Moten	So
DE	88	Lugard Edokpayi	Jr
DE	90	John Henry Daley	Sr
DT	91	Jonah Lea'ea	Sr
DT	92	Ted Hammond	Jr
DE	93	Benny Patterson III	So
DE	94	Nate Marshall (S)	So
DT	95	Trey Pierce (C)	Sr
DT	97	Titan Davis	Fr
DT	99	Bobby Kanka	So

Special teams

Pos.	#	Name	Class
P	33	Cam Brown	So
K	35	Stuart Blake	Jr
LS	43	Jack Treutelaar	Fr
LS	46	Gavin Magorien	So
LS	49	Nico Crawford	GS
LS	67	Trent Middleton	Sr
P	90	Hudson Hollenbeck	GS
P	93	Hunter Robertson	Sr
K	97	Jacob Baggett	Fr
K	99	Trey Butkowski	So

Head coach

- Kyle Whittingham

Coordinators/assistant coaches

- Jay Hill (defensive coordinator)
- Jason Beck (offensive coordinator / quarterbacks)
- Kerry Coombs (special teams coordinator)
- Jim Harding (assistant head coach / interim offensive coordinator / offensive line)
- Tony Alford (running backs / offensive run game coordinator)
- Micah Simon (wide receivers)
- Freddie Whittingham (tight ends)
- Koy Detmer Jr. (quarterbacks)
- Lewis Powell (defensive ends / defensive run game coordinator)
- Larry Black (defensive tackles)
- Alex Whittingham (linebackers)
- Jernaro Gilford (cornerbacks)
- Tyler Stockton (safeties)
- Doug Elisaia (strength and conditioning coach)

Support staff

- Eli Alford (assistant running backs)
- Ronald Bellamy (director of player personnel)
- Luke Bottari (assistant quarterbacks)
- Garrett Clawson (assistant special teams)
- David Denham (assistant defensive line)
- Marques Hagans (assistant wide receivers)
- Brad Hawkins (assistant safeties)
- Eddie Heckard (assistant cornerbacks)
- Fred Jackson (assistant running backs)
- Brian Knorr (assistant special teams)
- Mike Lynch (assistant offensive line)
- Tyler McLaurin (assistant outside linebackers)
- Ali'i Niumatalolo (assistant tight ends)
- Dave Peloquin (general manager)

Legend

- (C) Team captain
- (S) Suspended
- (I) Ineligible
- Injured
- Redshirt

Roster
Last update: October 22, 2026

=== 2026 recruiting class ===
College recruiting
Name	Hometown	School	Height	Weight	Commit date
Carter Meadows; EDGE	Bethesda, Maryland	Gonzaga College High School	6 ft 6 in (1.98 m)	235 lb (107 kg)	Jun 29, 2025
Carter Meadows; EDGE	Recruit ratings: Rivals: 247Sports: ESPN:				
Savion Hiter; RB	Louisa, Virginia	Louisa County High School	6 ft 0 in (1.83 m)	210 lb (95 kg)	Aug 19, 2025
Savion Hiter; RB	Recruit ratings: Rivals: 247Sports: ESPN:				
Salesi Moa; ATH	Ogden, Utah	Fremont High School	6 ft 1 in (1.85 m)	190 lb (86 kg)	Jan 16, 2026
Salesi Moa; ATH	Recruit ratings: Rivals: 247Sports: ESPN:				
Titan Davis; DL	Overland, Missouri	De Smet Jesuit High School	6 ft 4 in (1.93 m)	275 lb (125 kg)	Jun 23, 2025
Titan Davis; DL	Recruit ratings: Rivals: 247Sports: ESPN:				
Malakai Lee; OL	Kāneʻohe, Hawaii	Kamehameha Schools	6 ft 7 in (2.01 m)	350 lb (160 kg)	Jun 27, 2025
Malakai Lee; OL	Recruit ratings: Rivals: 247Sports: ESPN:				
Travis Johnson; WR	Chesapeake, Virginia	Oscar F. Smith High School	6 ft 2 in (1.88 m)	185 lb (84 kg)	Jul 4, 2025
Travis Johnson; WR	Recruit ratings: Rivals: 247Sports: ESPN:				
Jamarion Vincent; DB	Waco, Texas	Connally High School	6 ft 2 in (1.88 m)	170 lb (77 kg)	Nov 30, 2025
Jamarion Vincent; DB	Recruit ratings: Rivals: 247Sports: ESPN:				
Alister Vallejo; DL	Liberty Hill, Texas	Liberty Hill High School	6 ft 3 in (1.91 m)	310 lb (140 kg)	Jun 10, 2025
Alister Vallejo; DL	Recruit ratings: Rivals: 247Sports: ESPN:				
Marky Walbridge; OL	Hanover, Massachusetts	Saint Sebastian's School	6 ft 6 in (1.98 m)	285 lb (129 kg)	Jun 25, 2025
Marky Walbridge; OL	Recruit ratings: Rivals: 247Sports: ESPN:				
Tommy Carr; QB	Saline, Michigan	Saline High School	6 ft 4 in (1.93 m)	185 lb (84 kg)	Nov 16, 2025
Tommy Carr; QB	Recruit ratings: Rivals: 247Sports: ESPN:				
Tariq Boney; EDGE	Washington, D.C.	St. John's College High School	6 ft 2 in (1.88 m)	245 lb (111 kg)	Apr 26, 2025
Tariq Boney; EDGE	Recruit ratings: Rivals: 247Sports: ESPN:				
Jordan Deck; DB	Little Elm, Texas	Lone Star High School	6 ft 2 in (1.88 m)	190 lb (86 kg)	Jul 16, 2025
Jordan Deck; DB	Recruit ratings: Rivals: 247Sports: ESPN:				
McHale Blade; DL	Country Club Hills, Illinois	Simeon Career Academy	6 ft 4 in (1.93 m)	245 lb (111 kg)	Jun 9, 2025
McHale Blade; DL	Recruit ratings: Rivals: 247Sports: ESPN:				
Brady Smigiel; QB	Thousand Oaks, California	Newbury Park High School	6 ft 5 in (1.96 m)	215 lb (98 kg)	Apr 26, 2025
Brady Smigiel; QB	Recruit ratings: Rivals: 247Sports: ESPN:				
Mason Bonner; TE	Lakewood, Colorado	Mullen High School	6 ft 7 in (2.01 m)	225 lb (102 kg)	May 22, 2025
Mason Bonner; TE	Recruit ratings: Rivals: 247Sports: ESPN:				
Adrian "Ace" Hamilton; OL	Clinton, Maryland	St. John's College High School	6 ft 3 in (1.91 m)	295 lb (134 kg)	Dec 2, 2025
Adrian "Ace" Hamilton; OL	Recruit ratings: Rivals: 247Sports: ESPN:				
Aden Reeder; LB	Monroe, Ohio	St. Xavier High School	6 ft 2 in (1.88 m)	215 lb (98 kg)	Nov 6, 2025
Aden Reeder; LB	Recruit ratings: Rivals: 247Sports: ESPN:				
Tommy Fraumann; OL	Wilmette, Illinois	Loyola Academy	6 ft 8 in (2.03 m)	265 lb (120 kg)	Nov 7, 2025
Tommy Fraumann; OL	Recruit ratings: Rivals: 247Sports: ESPN:				
Markel Dabney; LB	Chesterfield, Virginia	Huguenot High School	6 ft 1 in (1.85 m)	225 lb (102 kg)	Jun 27, 2025
Markel Dabney; LB	Recruit ratings: Rivals: 247Sports: ESPN:				
Jonathan Brown; RB	Westerville, Ohio	St. Francis DeSales High School	6 ft 2 in (1.88 m)	200 lb (91 kg)	Jun 21, 2025
Jonathan Brown; RB	Recruit ratings: Rivals: 247Sports: ESPN:				
Ernest Nunley; DB	Anaheim, California	Western High School	6 ft 0 in (1.83 m)	180 lb (82 kg)	Jan 20, 2026
Ernest Nunley; DB	Recruit ratings: Rivals: 247Sports: ESPN:				
Kaden Catchings; LB	Jackson, Mississippi	Hartfield Academy	6 ft 1 in (1.85 m)	220 lb (100 kg)	Nov 11, 2025
Kaden Catchings; LB	Recruit ratings: Rivals: 247Sports: ESPN:				
Jaylen Pile; WR	Grapevine, Texas	Parish Episcopal School	6 ft 0 in (1.83 m)	195 lb (88 kg)	Oct 17, 2024
Jaylen Pile; WR	Recruit ratings: Rivals: 247Sports: ESPN:				
Ndi Etta; EDGE	Keller, Texas	Liberty Christian School	6 ft 2 in (1.88 m)	215 lb (98 kg)	Feb 1, 2026
Ndi Etta; EDGE	Recruit ratings: Rivals: 247Sports:				
Jacob Baggett; K	Charlotte, North Carolina	Providence Day School	6 ft 0 in (1.83 m)	170 lb (77 kg)	Jan 22, 2026
Jacob Baggett; K	Recruit ratings: Rivals: 247Sports:				
Overall recruit ranking: 247Sports: 12 On3: 11 ESPN: 11
Note: In many cases, Scout, Rivals, 247Sports, On3, and ESPN may conflict in their listings of height and weight.; In these cases, the average was taken. ESPN grades are on a 100-point scale.; Sources: "2026 Michigan football commitments". ESPN.; "2026 Team Ranking". Rivals.com.; "2026 Michigan football commitments". 247Sports.; "2026 Michigan football commitments". On3.

=== Incoming transfers ===
Michigan incoming transfers
Name	Pos.	Height	Weight	Year	Hometown	Previous team
Max Alford	LB	6'1"	230	GS	Park City, Utah	BYU
Chris Bracy	S	6'1"	195	SR	Mobile, Alabama	Memphis
Cam Brown	P	6'2"	185	SO	Coolangatta, Queensland, Australia	UNLV
JJ Buchanan	TE / WR	6'3"	225	SO	Henderson, Nevada	Utah
Trey Butkowski	K	6'0"	170	SO	Orlando, Florida	Pittsburgh
Nico Crawford	LS	6'2"	235	GS	Dublin, Ohio	Pittsburgh
John Henry Daley	DE	6'4"	255	SR	Alpine, Utah	Utah
Jeremiah Earby	DB	6'2"	186	GS	East Palo Alto, California	Boise State (mid-season transfer)
Jaime Ffrench	WR	6'1"	185	SO	Jacksonville, Florida	Texas
Brayden Fowler-Nicolosi	QB	6'2"	200	GS	Aledo, Texas	Colorado State
Houston Ka'aha'aina-Torres	OL	6'3"	300	SO	Waimānalo, Hawaii	Nebraska
Jonah Lea'ea	DT	6'5"	285	SR	San Mateo, California	Utah
Gavin Magorien	LS	6'0"	202	SO	Erie, Pennsylvania	Marshall
Aisea Moa	LB	6'2"	235	GS	Ogden, Utah	Michigan State
Salesi Moa	WR / DB	6'1"	190	FR	Ogden, Utah	Utah (short-term signee)
Ernest Nunley	DB	6'0"	180	FR	Anaheim, California	California (short-term signee)
Christian Pierce	LB	6'0"	235	SO	Chicago, Illinois	Western Illinois
Smith Snowden	CB	5'10"	185	SR	Lehi, Utah	Utah
Nathaniel Staehling	LB	6'2"	238	GS	Baxter, Minnesota	North Dakota State

== Awards and honors ==
Weekly awards
Player	Award	Date awarded	Ref.
John Henry Daley	Big Ten Defensive Player of the Week	September 14, 2026	
Jyaire Hill	Jim Thorpe Award National Defensive Back of the Week	September 15, 2026	
Chris Bracy	Big Ten Defensive Player of the Week	October 19, 2026	
Tommy Carr	Big Ten Freshman of the Week	November 2, 2026	
