= Mark Harlan =

Athletic director at the University of Utah

Current position
- Title: Athletic director
- Team: Utah
- Conference: Big 12

Biographical details
- Education: University of Arizona

Administrative career (AD unless noted)
- 2002-2004: Arizona (Assistant AD)
- 2004-2005: Northern Colorado (Assoc. AD)
- 2005-2006: San Jose State (Assoc. AD)
- 2006-2010: Arizona (SVP for Central Development)
- 2010-2013: UCLA (Sr. Assoc. AD)
- 2013–2018: South Florida
- 2018–present: Utah

Mark Harlan is the athletic director at the University of Utah. Prior to taking the position at Utah, he was the athletic director at the University of South Florida.

== College ==
Harlan is a graduate of the University of Arizona, where he earned a bachelor's degree in political science and a master's degree in education.

== Career ==
Harlan is the athletics director at the University of Utah. In his first five years leading the Utes' athletics department, Utah won four national championships and 24 conference championships. The Utes earned their highest finish in the LEARFIELD Director's Cup in 2022-23 and won a school-record 10 conference championships, while Harlan was named Cushman & Wakefield A.D. of the Year by NACDA. He received a contract extension in June 2023, through 2028. Harlan has held sports administration positions at the University of South Florida, San Jose State, Northern Colorado, UCLA, and the University of Arizona. He spent five years as athletic director at the University of South Florida.

Harlan left USF to become the athletic director of the University of Utah in June 2018.

== Family ==
Harlan and his wife, Carolyn, have two children, Savannah and Austin.

== Controversy ==
=== South Florida ===
In 2015–2016, the USF men's basketball team was involved in an academic scandal. USF released a statement that in part read they and the NCAA “are working together to investigate and resolve an inquiry into potential violations of NCAA bylaws and university standards….” Harlan was criticized for his ethical character and mismanagement. In 2016, he was criticized for the debacle of USF's pitch to join the Big 12 conference. In their presentation, they misspelled the word “research” as “reasearch”.

=== Utah ===
Mark Harlan's controversies as the athletic director of the University of Utah have drawn significant criticism, particularly following high-profile incidents involving officiating criticism and a contentious separation with longtime head football coach Kyle Whittingham. These events have contributed to perceptions among some fans and observers in the Big 12 Conference that Harlan ranks among the conference's least effective athletic directors, with online discussions (such as on Reddit's r/BigXII) accusing him of poor leadership, mishandling transitions, and unprofessional public behavior. On November 9, 2024, following Utah's 22–21 loss to Brigham Young University (BYU) in the Holy War rivalry game, Harlan entered the field during a live kickoff return to confront the Big 12 officiating crew over a defensive holding penalty that extended BYU's final drive, leading to their game-winning field goal. He then addressed the media postgame, declaring the game was "absolutely stolen" from Utah due to "poor and biased officiating" and expressing disappointment with the Big 12, stating, "We were excited about being in the Big 12, but tonight I am not." The Big 12 Conference responded with a public reprimand and a $40,000 fine—the largest ever issued to a Big 12 athletic director—for violating sportsmanship policies by irresponsibly challenging the professionalism of officials and the conference's integrity. Harlan later apologized in a January 2025 interview, describing his reaction as emotional.

==== Whittingham dispute ====
A more significant controversy emerged in late 2025 and early 2026 involving Harlan's dispute with head coach Kyle Whittingham. Whittingham, after 21 seasons at Utah, stepped down on December 12, 2025, following failed negotiations over salary, program control, and transition terms (including ceding some authority to then-coach-in-waiting Morgan Scalley and requiring Harlan's approval for certain staffing decisions). Whittingham signed a $13.5 million separation agreement with Utah, paid in installments, but soon after accepted the head coaching position at Michigan on December 26, 2025. Documents later revealed Harlan expressed frustration in a January 2026 letter to Whittingham, accusing him of violating the agreement's clause requiring assistance with a "smooth and successful transition" by recruiting Utah assistants (including Jason Beck and Jim Harding) and staff to Michigan, as well as influencing recruit Salesi Moa to decommit from Utah and follow him.

Utah proceeded with the first $8 million installment. The handling of Whittingham's departure drew backlash, with fans and media describing it as "inexcusable" treatment of a program icon, further fueling criticism of Harlan's leadership and contributing to some viewing him as one of the Big 12's worst athletic directors due to public missteps, strained relationships, and program controversies. Harlan's lashed out on social media over Salesi Moa's decommitment which also sparked additional backlash for Harlan's lack of maturity.

== See also ==
- List of NCAA Division I athletic directors
