= 2026 Western Michigan vs. Michigan football game =

- Western Michigan lining up on offense during the game
Western Michigan Broncos	Michigan Wolverines
(0–0)	(0–0)
MAC	Big Ten
12	13
Head coach: Lance Taylor	Head coach: Kyle Whittingham
	AP / Coaches; 16 / 16
	1	2	3	4	Total
Western Michigan	3	3	0	6	12
Michigan	7	0	0	6	13
- Date: September 5, 2026
- Season: 2026
- Stadium: Michigan Stadium
- Location: Ann Arbor, Michigan
- Favorite: Michigan by 27.5
- National anthem: Michigan Marching Band
- Referee: Jim Wharrie
- Attendance: 110,879

United States TV coverage
- Network: NBC
- Announcers: Noah Eagle (play-by-play); Todd Blackledge (color commentary); Kathryn Tappen (sideline reporter)

The 2026 Western Michigan vs. Michigan football game was a regular-season college football game between the Western Michigan Broncos and Michigan Wolverines. It was the season-opening game for both teams played on September 5, 2026, at Michigan Stadium in Ann Arbor, Michigan, with Michigan entering ranked No. 16 in both major polls.

Following a failed Hail Mary pass by Michigan as time appeared to expire on the TV clock, Western Michigan led 12–7. However, Big Ten officials controversially added one second to the clock. Michigan then scored on a 47-yard Hail Mary from Bryce Underwood to JJ Buchanan, giving the Wolverines a 13–12 victory. The decision to add one second of game time sparked significant debate and backlash from fans and commentators.

== Background ==
The football programs representing the University of Michigan and Western Michigan University first met in 1917. Ahead of the game, the two programs played each other eight times, all of which were won by Michigan and all of which were played in Ann Arbor. The previous meeting between the two programs came on September 4, 2021, when Michigan defeated Western Michigan, 47–14.

Coming into the contest, Western Michigan had only ever beaten one AP ranked opponent in their program's history, taking down No. 24 Toledo in 2015. Michigan paid Western Michigan $1.5 million for the game.

=== Western Michigan ===
The Broncos entered the 2026 season following one of the best seasons in program history. In 2025, the Broncos finished 10–4, winning the MAC championship and the Myrtle Beach Bowl, becoming the first team in program history to win a conference championship and a bowl game. Head coach Lance Taylor and quarterback Broc Lowry returned this season with the Broncos selected as the preseason favorite to win the MAC in the Coaches Poll.

=== Michigan ===
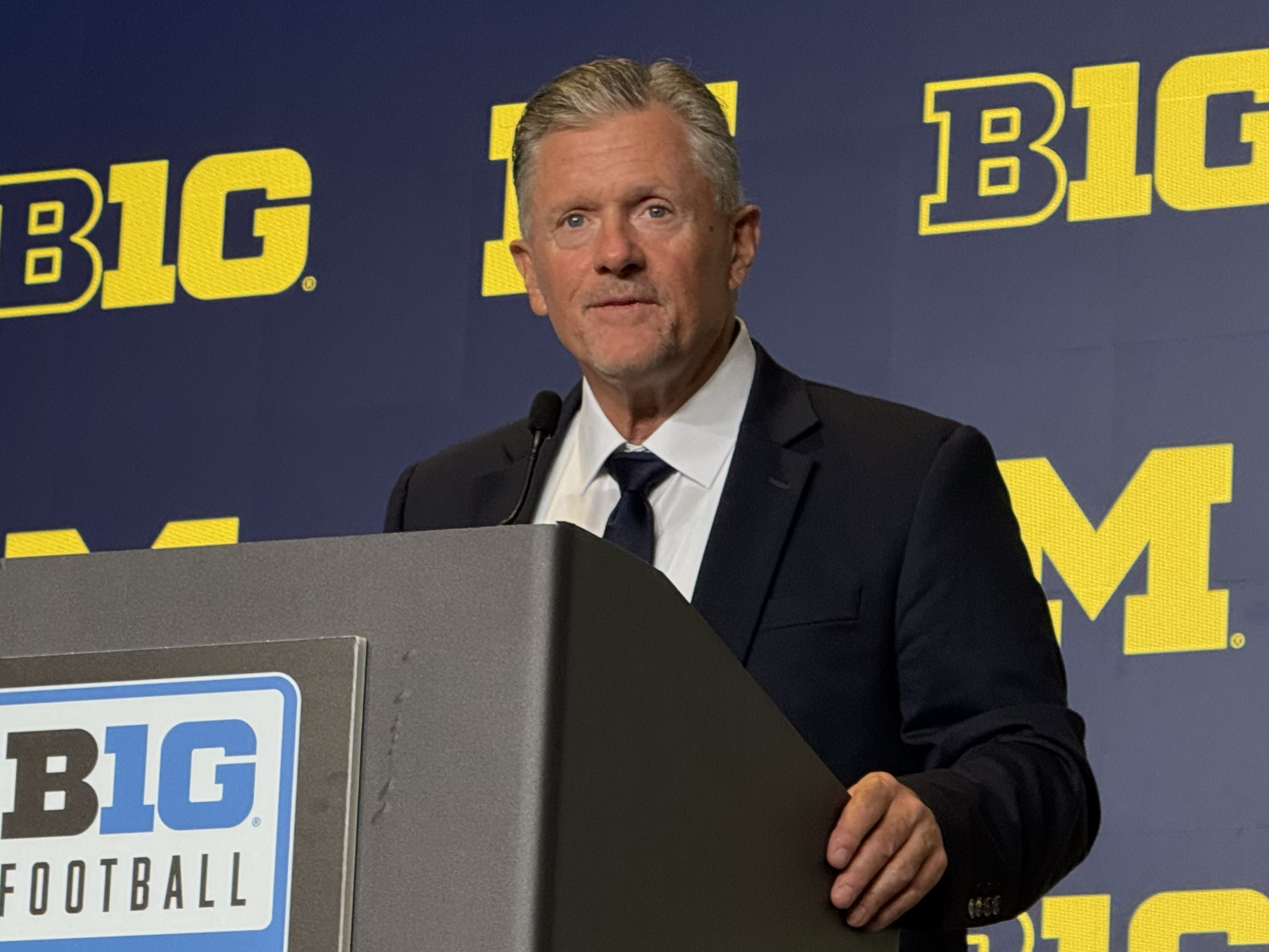
Michigan head coach Kyle Whittingham

The Wolverines entered the 2026 season following a 9–4 campaign the previous year. The season marked the first for head coach Kyle Whittingham following the dismissal of Sherrone Moore, while quarterback Bryce Underwood returned for his sophomore season. The Wolverines began the 2026 season ranked No. 16 in both the AP and Coaches poll. Michigan was picked to finish fifth in the conference in the media preseason poll.

== Game summary ==
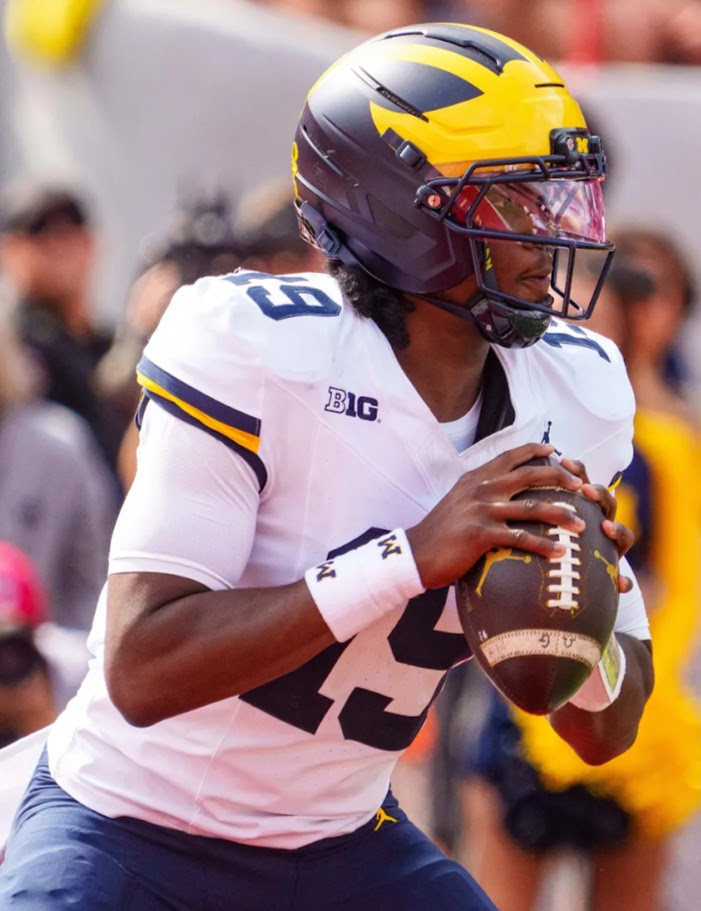
Michigan quarterback Bryce Underwood threw the game winning touchdown as time expired

Michigan received the opening kickoff and drove deep into Western Michigan territory, with a 10-yard run by Bryce Underwood setting up first-and-goal at the Broncos' 5-yard line. After Western Michigan's defense forced a fourth down, Michigan converted as Underwood scored on a quarterback sneak to give the Wolverines the first points of the season. The Broncos responded with an eight-play drive that ended with Dieter Kelly's 52-yard field goal. After the teams exchanged punts, Michigan muffed a punt, giving Western Michigan possession at the Wolverines' 27-yard line. However, the Broncos failed to capitalize, turning the ball over on downs. Following the exchange, the teams traded six consecutive punts, three apiece. With time winding down in the first half, Underwood threw an interception to Dillon Moore in Michigan territory. The Broncos capitalized on the turnover, with Kelly converting a 45-yard field goal as time expired to cut Michigan's lead to 7–6 at halftime.

The Broncos received the opening kickoff of the second half but were forced to punt after a three-play drive. Following another Michigan punt, Western Michigan embarked on a 20-play, 71-yard drive that consumed 13:40 of game time. The Broncos steadily moved the ball against Michigan's defense before settling for a 39-yard field goal to take their first lead of the night, 9–7. Western Michigan quickly forced a three-and-out and regained possession. Although the Broncos failed to score, they took 5:56 off the clock before punting the ball back to Michigan. Starting at their own 7-yard line with 3:04 remaining, the Wolverines opened the drive with a 15-yard run by Jordan Marshall. Two plays later, however, Underwood fumbled, giving Western Michigan possession with less than two minutes remaining. The Broncos were unable to run out the clock and settled for a 33-yard field goal with 35 seconds remaining. Michigan got the ball back with one final chance to avoid the upset. After two incompletions to begin the drive, Underwood connected with JJ Buchanan for a 28-yard gain to move the Wolverines into better field position. Michigan then spiked the ball to stop the clock.

With nine seconds remaining, Underwood threw a Hail Mary pass into the end zone that fell incomplete after being touched by Western Michigan safety Micah Davis who was outside the back of the end zone. Big Ten officials reviewed the play and determined that one second remained on the clock when Davis touched the ball, allowing Michigan one final play. The decision was controversial, as NBC's broadcast showed their digital game clock at zero seconds when Davis made contact with the ball. On the ensuing play, Underwood threw another Hail Mary, this time connecting with JJ Buchanan for a 47-yard touchdown and giving Michigan a 13–12 victory.

Throughout the sequence, NBC's rules analyst Terry McAulay made several comments appearing to disagree with the officials, stating "I don't see how that happened, assuming our clock is correct." He did however immediately point out a possible clock sync issue by their broadcast clock. These comments would go on to fuel the controversy.

=== Scoring summary ===
2026 Western Michigan vs. Michigan football game

Quarter	1	2	3	4	Total
Western Michigan	3	3	0	6	12
No. 16 Michigan	7	0	0	6	13

at Michigan Stadium • Ann Arbor, Michigan

- Date: Saturday, September 5, 2026
- Game time: 7:30 p.m. EDT
- Game attendance: 110,879
- Referee: Jim Wharrie (Big Ten)
- TV announcers (NBC): Noah Eagle (play-by-play), Todd Blackledge (analyst), Kathryn Tappen (sideline)

Scoring summary

Quarter	Time	Drive			Team	Scoring information	Score	
Quarter	Time	Plays	Yards	TOP	Team	Scoring information	Western Michigan	Michigan
1	9:40	11	75	5:20	Michigan	Bryce Underwood 1-yard touchdown run, Trey Butkowski kick good	0	7
1	5:17	8	42	4:23	Western Michigan	52-yard field goal by Dieter Kelly	3	7
2	0:00	2	-1	0:09	Western Michigan	45-yard field goal by Dieter Kelly	6	7
4	10:25	20	71	13:40	Western Michigan	39-yard field goal by Dieter Kelly	9	7
4	0:35	5	17	1:15	Western Michigan	33-yard field goal by Dieter Kelly	12	7
4	0:00	6	75	0:35	Michigan	JJ Buchanan 47-yard touchdown reception from Bryce Underwood	12	13
"TOP" = time of possession. For other American football terms, see Glossary of American football.							12	13

== Statistics ==
Team statistical comparison
Statistic	Western Michigan	Michigan
First downs	16	12
First downs rushing	10	6
First downs passing	4	4
First downs penalty	2	2
Third down efficiency	8–18	3–10
Fourth down efficiency	0–1	1–1
Total plays–net yards	67–221	48–276
Rushing attempts–net yards	46–132	25–106
Yards per rush	2.9	4.2
Yards passing	89	170
Pass completions–attempts	15–21	12–23
Interceptions thrown	0	1
Punt returns–total yards	1–0	2–9
Kickoff returns–total yards	0–0	1–18
Punts–average yardage	6–40.0	6–44.7
Fumbles–lost	0–0	2–2
Penalties–yards	5–40	9–80
Time of possession	40:08	19:52

Western Michigan statistics
Broncos passing
	C–A	Yds	TD–INT
Broc Lowry	15–21	89	0–0
Broncos rushing
	Car	Yds	TD
Jalen Buckley	19	62	0
Broc Lowry	15	35	0
Ofa Mataele	4	16	0
Emazon Littlejohn	3	8	0
Harper Hughes	1	6	0
Cole Cabana	3	6	0
Broncos receiving
	Rec	Yds	TD
Aveion Chenault	6	53	0
Baylin Brooks	2	24	0
Adam Parks	2	9	0
Nate Levicki	1	4	0
Cole Cabana	2	1	0
Egypt Nelson	2	-2	0

Michigan statistics
Wolverines passing
	C–A	Yds	TD–INT
Bryce Underwood	12–22	170	1–1
Wolverines rushing
	Car	Yds	TD
Bryce Underwood	9	47	1
Jordan Marshall	11	44	0
Savion Hiter	5	15	0
Wolverines receiving
	Rec	Yds	TD
JJ Buchanan	6	126	1
Jordan Marshall	2	17	0
Andrew Marsh	2	15	0
Jalen Hoffman	1	13	0
Savion Hiter	1	-1	0

== Aftermath and reactions ==
Michigan fans storming the field after the win

Immediately following the conclusion of the game, Michigan fans rushed the field. The field storming drew criticism and surprise from some fans, media, and coaches.

Following the win, Michigan fell out of the AP poll rankings after entering at No. 16, establishing a record for the highest-ranked team to fall out the poll following a win since it expanded from 20 to 25 teams in 1989. It surpassed the 2014 Nebraska Cornhuskers, which fell out from No. 19. Michigan also fell in the Coaches Poll from No. 16 to No. 24. The following week, Michigan defeated No. 11 Oklahoma, 17–10, and Western Michigan earned its first win after routing Monmouth, 49–14.

Hours after the game, the Big Ten Conference released video and audio recordings of the officials' replay review, which showed one second left when Davis touched the ball while out of bounds. The Mid-American Conference (MAC) initially accepted the Big Ten's explanation and the result of the game. Frame-by-frame video confirmed that time was remaining and that the broadcast clock was not in sync with the stadium clock. The next day, NBC announcer John Fanta stated that "the official time of the game is kept by the Big Ten. Our cameras are not the official arbiter of timekeeping within the game. That is the Big Ten and game officials' responsibility." A similar discrepancy between the NBC broadcast clock and the stadium clock was observed the following day during the Apple Cup between Washington and Washington State.

On September 8, the MAC reversed its position and announced that it would be appealing the result to the NCAA and the College Football Playoff, seeking to change the result from a 13–12 Michigan win to a 12–7 Western Michigan win. The MAC argued that the officials used the clock in the replay system rather than the NBC broadcast's clock, and that the replay protocol had therefore not been followed. The Big Ten immediately responded that they stood by their original postgame statement affirming Michigan's win, declining to comment further. The same day, the NCAA stated that the result would stand because it did not have the authority to overturn a game result determined by the officials. The NCAA did however issue a new guidance for a standard timing protocol. It stated in the event of a discrepancy between the broadcast clock and the officials' game clock when determining remaining time on the stadium clock, the embedded game clock contained within the program feed will be used to provide greater transparency to the public.

On September 16, the FBS Oversight Committee released a statement stating that the instant replay protocols had not been followed on the second-to-last play of the game and that the outcome of the game would have resulted in a Western Michigan win had the protocols been followed. The committee also stated that the game would not be overturned because it lacked the authority to do so.

The game immediately drew parallels to the 2009 Big 12 Championship game, where Texas defeated Nebraska upon officials also controversially adding time back onto the clock. Leading 12–10, Nebraska began celebrating when Texas quarterback Colt McCoy's pass landed out of bounds with no time showing on the clock. However, after discussion, officials determined there was still one second left. Texas won the game 13–12 via Hunter Lawrence's 46-yard field goal.

== See also ==
- Fail Mary
- 2001 Michigan vs. Michigan State football game
- 2009 Big 12 Championship Game
