= Nick Vigil =

American football player (born 1993)

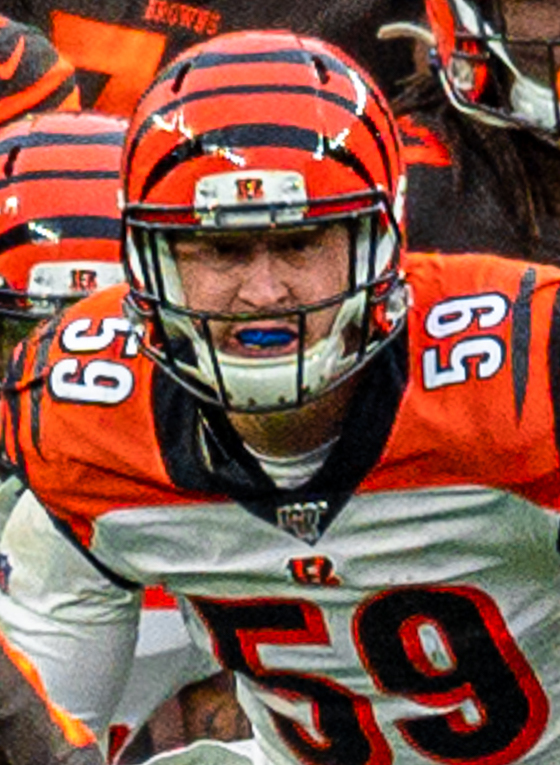
- Vigil with the Cincinnati Bengals in 2019

Profile
- Position: Linebacker

Personal information
- Born: August 20, 1993 (age 33); Plain City, Utah, U.S.
- Listed height: 6 ft 2 in (1.88 m)
- Listed weight: 239 lb (108 kg)

Career information
- High school: Fremont (Plain City)
- College: Utah State (2012–2015)
- NFL draft: 2016: 3rd round, 87th overall pick

Career history
- Cincinnati Bengals (2016–2019); Los Angeles Chargers (2020); Minnesota Vikings (2021); Arizona Cardinals (2022); New York Jets (2023)*; Minnesota Vikings (2023); Dallas Cowboys (2024)
- * Offseason or practice squad member only

Awards and highlights
- 2× First-team All-MWC (2014, 2015)

Career NFL statistics as of 2024
- Total tackles: 467
- Sacks: 5
- Forced fumbles: 2
- Fumble recoveries: 5
- Pass deflections: 17
- Interceptions: 3
- Defensive touchdowns: 1
- Stats at Pro Football Reference

Nick Vigil (born August 20, 1993) is an American professional football linebacker of the National Football League (NFL). He played college football for the Utah State Aggies, and was selected by the Cincinnati Bengals in the third round of the 2016 NFL draft. He has also played for the Los Angeles Chargers, the Arizona Cardinals and the Minnesota Vikings.

== Early life ==
Vigil attended Fremont High School in Plain City, Utah, where he played football and basketball. In football, Vigil committed to play college football at Utah State University.

== College career ==
As a redshirt freshman in 2013, Vigil started four of 14 games. He finished the season with 57 tackles and a team-leading 5.5 sacks. During his sophomore year, Vigil started all 13 games and finished the season with a team-leading 6 forced fumbles, 6 quarterback hurries, 123 tackles, 16.5 tackles for loss, and 7 sacks. As a junior in 2015, he started all 13 games with 144 tackles: good enough for sixth in the nation. After his junior year, he announced his intentions to enter the 2016 NFL draft.

== Professional career ==
=== Pre-draft ===
Vigil attended the NFL Scouting Combine in Indianapolis and completed the majority of combine drills, but chose to skip the bench press due to a pectoral injury. Vigil finished first among all linebackers participating at the NFL Combine in the short shuttle and three-cone drill, while finishing tenth in the 40-yard dash. On April 6, 2016, he participated in Utah State's pro day and opted to stand on the majority of combine numbers. Vigil performed the bench press and improved his times in the 40-yard dash (4.65s), 20-yard dash (2.70s), and 10-yard dash (1.58s). He conducted a private workout with the Atlanta Falcons and attended pre-draft visits with the New Orleans Saints and Chicago Bears. At the conclusion of the pre-draft process, Vigil was projected to be a fifth or sixth round pick by NFL draft experts and scouts.

External videos
- Nick Vigil's NFL Combine Workout

Pre-draft measurables
Height	Weight	Arm length	Hand span	40-yard dash	10-yard split	20-yard split	20-yard shuttle	Three-cone drill	Vertical jump	Broad jump	Bench press
6 ft 2 3/8 in (1.89 m)	239 lb (108 kg)	32 3/8 in (0.82 m)	10 1/4 in (0.26 m)	4.65 s	1.58 s	2.70 s	4.00 s	6.73 s	31.5 in (0.80 m)	9 ft 7 in (2.92 m)	15 reps
All values from NFL Combine/Pro Day

=== Cincinnati Bengals ===
==== 2016 ====
The Cincinnati Bengals selected Vigil in the third round (87th overall) of the 2016 NFL draft. Vigil was the 11th linebacker drafted in 2016.

External videos
- Bengals draft Nick Vigil 87th overall

On May 10, 2016, the Bengals signed Vigil to a four-year, $3.11 million contract that included a signing bonus of $695,629.

During training camp, Vigil competed for the role of backup linebacker against Paul Dawson and Marquis Flowers. Vigil earned praise for his performance during training camp and drew comparisons to the Carolina Panthers' Pro Bowl linebacker Luke Kuechly. Head coach Marvin Lewis named Vigil the backup weakside linebacker, behind Vincent Rey, to begin the regular season.

He made his professional regular season debut in the Bengals season-opener at the New York Jets and made one solo tackle in their 23–22 victory. On January 1, 2017, Vigil accrued a season-high six combined tackles and broke up a pass during a 27–10 win against the Baltimore Ravens. Vigil finished his rookie season in 2016 with 21 combined tackles (15 solo) and one pass deflection in 16 games and zero starts.

==== 2017 ====
Vigil entered training camp as a candidate to receive the job as the starting strongside linebacker after the Bengals opted not to re-sign Karlos Dansby. Vigil competed for the role against Marquis Flowers and rookie Jordan Evans. Vigil had an impressive preseason and was ultimately named the starting strongside linebacker to begin the regular season. He started alongside weakside linebacker Vontaze Burfict and middle linebacker Kevin Minter.

He made his first career start in the Bengals' season-opener against the Ravens and recorded ten combined tackles (six solo), broke up a pass, and made his first career interception during their 20–0 loss. Vigil intercepted a pass attempt by Ravens quarterback Joe Flacco, that was originally a screen pass intended for running back Terrance West, during the third quarter. On October 1, 2017, Vigil collected a season-high 12 combined tackles and made his first career sack during a 31–7 victory at the Cleveland Browns in Week 4. Vigil sacked Browns quarterback DeShone Kizer for a seven-yard loss in the second quarter. In Week 12, Vigil suffered a significant ankle injury during a 30–16 win against the Cleveland Browns and was inactive for three games (Weeks 13–15). On December 22, 2017, the Bengals officially placed Vigil on injured reserve for the remainder of the season. He finished the 2017 NFL season with 79 combined tackles (45 solo), five pass deflections, one interception, and one sack in 11 games and 11 starts.

==== 2018 ====
During training camp, Vigil competed against Carl Lawson to be the starting strongside linebacker after Lawson performed well in Vigil's absence. Head coach Marvin Lewis named Vigil the starting strongside linebacker to start the regular season, alongside Jordan Evans and middle linebacker Preston Brown. He started in the Bengals' season-opener at the Indianapolis Colts and collected a season-high 11 solo tackles during their 34–23 victory. In Week 3, he collected a season-high 12 combined tackles (nine solo) during a 31–21 loss at the Panthers. In Week 6, Vigil suffered a knee injury during the first quarter of a 28–21 loss to the Pittsburgh Steelers and missed the next two games (Weeks 7–8).

==== 2019 ====
In week 4 against the Steelers, Vigil recorded a team high 11 tackles and forced a fumble off rookie wide receiver Diontae Johnson in the 27–3 loss. In week 5 against the Arizona Cardinals, Vigil recorded a team high 13 tackles in the 26–23 loss. In week 6 against the Ravens, Vigil made a team high 13 tackles and recovered a fumble forced on tight end Mark Andrews in the 23–17 loss. In week 11 against the Oakland Raiders, Vigil recorded a team high 12 tackles and recovered a fumble forced by teammate Josh Tupou on Josh Jacobs in the 17–10 loss. In week 14 against the Browns, Vigil recorded his first interception of the season off a pass thrown by Baker Mayfield during the 27–19 loss.

=== Los Angeles Chargers ===
On March 30, 2020, the Los Angeles Chargers signed Vigil to a one-year contract. Vigil made his debut with the Chargers in Week 1 against his former team, the Bengals. During the game, Vigil recorded 5 tackles and recovered a fumble lost by Joe Mixon in the 16–13 win. In Week 15 against the Las Vegas Raiders on Thursday Night Football, Vigil led the team with nine tackles and recorded his first sack as a Charger on Derek Carr during the 30–27 overtime win.

=== Minnesota Vikings (first stint) ===
After becoming a free agent again following the 2020 season, Vigil signed a one-year contract worth up to $2.25 million with the Minnesota Vikings on April 6, 2021. He played in 16 games with 12 starts, finishing fourth on the team with 85 tackles.

=== Arizona Cardinals ===
On March 22, 2022, Vigil signed a one-year contract with the Cardinals. He was placed on injured reserve on October 8.

=== New York Jets ===
On August 6, 2023, Vigil signed with the Jets. He was released on August 28.

=== Minnesota Vikings (second stint) ===
On August 31, 2023, Vigil signed with the practice squad of the Vikings. He was signed to the active roster on November 11, 2023. Vigil was released on December 23. He was re-signed to the practice squad on December 29.

=== Dallas Cowboys ===
On August 6, 2024, Vigil signed with the Dallas Cowboys. He was released during roster cuts on August 27, 2024, and re-signed with the team the next day. He was promoted to the active roster on October 5.

== Personal life ==
Vigil is the younger brother of former linebacker Zach Vigil.
