= JJ Buchanan =

American football wide receiver

No. 6 – Michigan Wolverines
- Position: Wide receiver
- Class: Sophomore

Personal information
- Listed height: 6 ft 4 in (1.93 m)
- Listed weight: 218 lb (99 kg)

Career information
- High school: Coronado (Henderson, Nevada)
- College: Utah (2025); Michigan (2026–present)
- Stats at ESPN

JJ Buchanan is an American college football wide receiver for the Michigan Wolverines. He previously played for the Utah Utes.

== Early life ==
Buchanan attended Coronado High School in Henderson, Nevada. He played high school basketball and football, playing safety, tight end, receiver, running back, linebacker, punt and kick returner. Buchanan had over 2,000 all-purpose yards during his final two seasons. As a senior, he had 60 tackles on defense and 1,023 receiving yards with eleven touchdowns on offense. Buchanan was rated as a four-star recruit and the No. 184 overall player in the class of 2025 by 247Sports. He committed to play college football for the Utah Utes.

== College career ==
=== Utah ===
In 2025, Buchanan enrolled at the University of Utah and entered his freshman season in line to be a key contributor. In week three of the 2025 season, he caught his first collegiate touchdown versus Wyoming. In week five, Buchanan caught the Utes' first touchdown of the game against West Virginia. In the regular season finale, he had two catches for 65 yards and a touchdown in a win against Kansas. Buchanan finished his freshman season with 26 receptions for 427 yards and five touchdowns He led the nation in receiving yards for all freshman tight ends. After the season, Buchanan entered the NCAA transfer portal.

=== Michigan ===
In January 2026, Buchanan transferred to the University of Michigan, following head coach Kyle Whittingham from Utah. He was one of the most highly rated players in the nation to transfer, ranked as a top 50 player by ESPN, and a top 20 player by 247Sports and CBS Sports. Upon his arrival, he officially switched from being listed as a tight end to a wide receiver. In the season-opening 2026 Western Michigan vs. Michigan football game, Buchanan caught the game-winning, 47-yard Hail Mary pass for a touchdown as time expired in Michigan's 13–12 victory. He finished his Michigan debut with 126 receiving yards and one touchdown. It was the most receiving yards in a Michigan debut since Dick Rifenburg in 1944. In week four, Buchanan set a career-high with 130 receiving yards and two touchdowns versus Iowa.

=== Statistics ===
| Season | Team | GP | Receiving | | | |
| Season | Team | GP | Rec | Yds | Avg | TD |
|---|---|---|---|---|---|---|
| 2025 | Utah | 13 | 26 | 427 | 16.4 | 5 |
| 2026 | Michigan | 4 | 20 | 396 | 19.6 | 4 |
| Career | | 17 | 46 | 823 | 17.9 | 9 |

== Personal life ==
Buchanan has an older sister named Trinity, whom he credits with much of his motivation and competitive drive. Trinity played her first two seasons of college soccer for the UNLV Rebels, and currently plays for the Texas A&M Aggies. She has led each team in goals scored.
