= Tommy Carr (American football) =

American football player (born 2007)

No. 14 – Michigan Wolverines
- Position: Quarterback
- Class: Freshman

Personal information
- Born: August 30, 2007 (age 19)
- Listed height: 6 ft 4 in (1.93 m)
- Listed weight: 195 lb (88 kg)

Career information
- High school: Saline (Saline, Michigan)
- College: Michigan (2026–present)
- Stats at ESPN

Thomas Lloyd Carr (born August 30, 2007) is an American college football quarterback for the Michigan Wolverines. He is the grandson of College Football Hall of Famers, Lloyd Carr and Tom Curtis, as well as the younger brother of CJ Carr.

== Early life ==
Carr attended Saline High School in Saline, Michigan. He took over as the starting quarterback at Saline during his junior season, after his older brother CJ Carr graduated. Following his junior season, Carr was rated as a three-star recruit and the top ranked quarterback in Michigan by 247Sports. He first committed to play college football for the Miami RedHawks in Ohio. Carr later flipped his commitment and signed to play for the in-state Michigan Wolverines. He finished his senior year as a four-star recruit, ranked as such by 247Sports and Rivals.

== College career ==
In January 2026, Carr enrolled early at the University of Michigan and started his freshman season competing for the Wolverines backup quarterback spot behind incumbent sophomore, Bryce Underwood. In the team's spring game, Carr completed 21 of 30 pass attempts for 147 yards, while also adding 59 yards on the ground.

Carr earned the second-string role behind Underwood to start his freshman season in 2026, beating out Brayden Fowler-Nicolosi. In his collegiate debut against UTEP in week three, Carr threw a back-shoulder pass to Salesi Moa for his first career touchdown, which was also Moa’s first career touchdown reception. In total, Carr was 2-for-2 for 23 yards and a touchdown, and added 18 yards rushing. On October 17, against the Penn State Nittany Lions, Carr entered the game to start the second half after Underwood was benched, leading Michigan to a 21–18 comeback victory. He was 5-of-7 for 47 passing yards, and rushed four times for 36 yards and his first career rushing touchdown. On October 24, against Indiana, Carr made his first career start and became the sixth true-freshman quarterback to start for Michigan, following Bryce Underwood (2025), Tate Forcier (2009), Chad Henne (2004), Rich Hewlett (1979) and Rick Leach (1975). On October 31, against Rutgers, he completed 22 of 27 passes for 266 yards, and rushed for 54 yards on 12 carries, accounting for three touchdowns, including two rushing touchdowns. His 81% completion percentage is the highest single-game percentage by any freshman starting quarterback in Michigan history with a minimum of 20 attempts.

=== Statistics ===
Year	Team	Games			Passing								Rushing			
Year	Team	GP	GS	Record	Cmp	Att	Pct	Yds	Y/A	TD	Int	Rtg	Att	Yds	Avg	TD
2026	Michigan	6	4	1–3	67	106	63.2	686	6.5	2	3	118.4	49	138	2.8	3
Career		6	4	1–3	67	106	63.2	686	6.5	2	3	118.4	49	138	2.8	3

== Personal life ==
Both of Carr’s grandfathers are in the College Football Hall of Fame: Tom Curtis, a former All-American for the Michigan Wolverines, and Lloyd Carr, the former Michigan head football coach from 1995–2007. He is the son of Tammi and Jason Carr, a former backup quarterback at Michigan. Tommy is the younger brother of starting Notre Dame quarterback CJ Carr. He also had a younger brother named Chad, who passed away in 2015 as a result of Diffuse Intrinsic Pontine Glioma. He and his family founded and operate The ChadTough Foundation to provide awareness.
