= Trey Pierce =

American football player (born 2004)

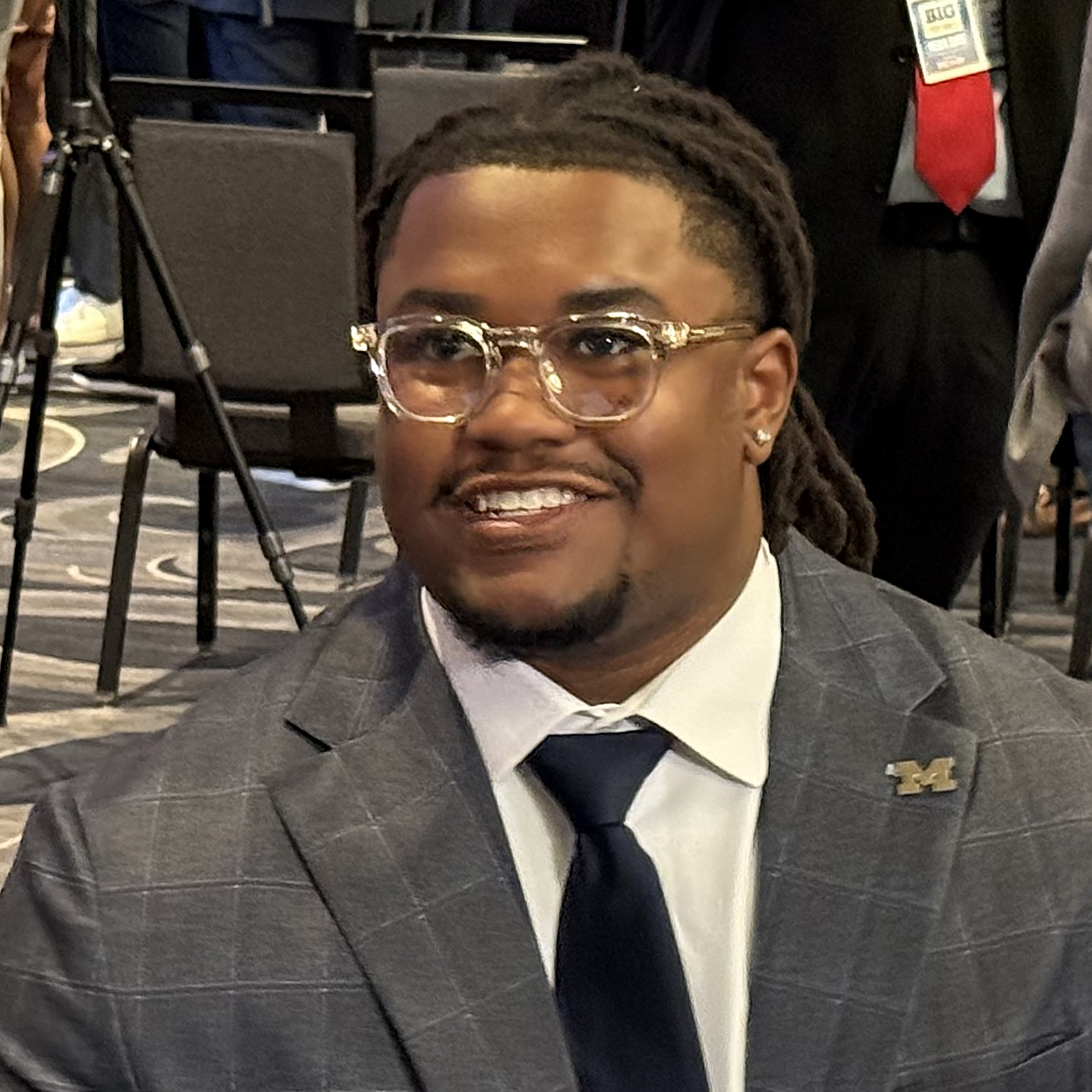
- Pierce at 2026 Big Ten Media Day

No. 95 – Michigan Wolverines
- Position: Defensive tackle
- Class: Senior

Personal information
- Born: December 14, 2004 (age 21)
- Listed height: 6 ft 2 in (1.88 m)
- Listed weight: 310 lb (141 kg)

Career information
- High school: Brother Rice (Chicago, Illinois)
- College: Michigan (2023–present)

Awards and highlights
- CFP national champion (2023)
- Stats at ESPN

Roderick "Trey" Pierce III (born December 14, 2004) is an American college football defensive tackle for the Michigan Wolverines.

== Early life ==
Pierce attended Brother Rice High School in Chicago, Illinois. In high school, he received offers from schools such as UConn, Duke, Illinois, Kansas, Minnesota, Missouri, Iowa State, Purdue, and Syracuse. Pierce initially committed to play college football for the Wisconsin Badgers. However, he later de-committed from the Badgers and signed to play for Jim Harbaugh and the Michigan Wolverines.

== College career ==
As a freshman in 2023, Pierce posted two tackles in 13 games played during the Wolverines national championship season. As a sophomore in the 2024 ReliaQuest Bowl, he got his first career start in an upset victory against Alabama. Pierce registered seven tackles in 2024. He earned the starting defensive tackle position with the 2025 team. Pierce started all 13 games and recorded 30 tackles, earning an All-Big Ten honorable mention. As a senior, Pierce was voted by his teammates as a captain for the 2026 Michigan Wolverines football team.

== Personal life ==
Pierce is the older brother of Michigan linebacker, Christian Pierce.
