= Tariq Boney =

American football player (born 2007)

No. 41 – Michigan Wolverines
- Position: Defensive end
- Class: Freshman

Personal information
- Born: January 20, 2007 (age 19)
- Listed height: 6 ft 1 in (1.85 m)
- Listed weight: 243 lb (110 kg)

Career information
- High school: St. John's College (Washington, D.C.)
- College: Michigan (2026–present)
- Stats at ESPN

Tariq Boney (born January 20, 2007) is an American college football defensive end for the Michigan Wolverines.

== Early life ==
Boney was born on January 20, 2007, and grew up in Washington, D.C. He attended St. John's College High School where he played football as a defensive end and running back. In his junior year, Boney ran for 1,897 yards and 29 touchdowns. Boney participated at the 2025 Under Armour All-America Game.

As a senior, Boney posted 48 tackles, 22 tackles-for-loss (TFLs), 13 sacks and two forced fumbles, helping his team to the semifinals of the Washington Catholic Athletic Conference (WCAC) Capital Division tournament. He was honored as the 2025 Gatorade Washington, D.C. Football Player of the Year and the 2025 WCAC Defensive Player of the Year. Boney was also selected twice in his career as a first-team All-WCAC performer. He was ranked a three-star recruit in the class of 2026 by most services, while ESPN ranked him as a four-star prospect. He committed to play college football for the Michigan Wolverines.

While in high school, Boney also played basketball for an Amateur Athletic Union (AAU) team and was teammates with Carter Meadows, whom he later joined on the defensive line at Michigan.

== College career ==
Boney was a standout in training camp for Michigan prior to the 2026 season. After only appearing in one snap in the first two games, he recorded four tackles, 1.5 TFLs and a sack in the third game of the season against UTEP. He posted another sack the following week against Iowa.
