= Fremont High School (Utah) =

Public high school in Utah, United States

Location
- 1900 N 4700 W Plain City, Utah 84404; 41°17′30″N 112°05′24″W

Information
- Type: Public, Comprehensive
- Founded: 1994
- Principal: Alicia Mitchell
- Teaching staff: 62.41 (on an FTE basis)
- Grades: 10–12
- Enrollment: 1,448 (2024–2025)
- Average class size: 6A
- Student to teacher ratio: 23.20
- Colors: Blue and silver
- Mascot: Silverwolves
- Website: https://fremont.wsd.net

Fremont High School is a public high school located at 1900 North 4700 West in Plain City, Utah that serves the residents of rural Weber County. This school opened in the fall of 1994. The current principal is Alicia Mitchell. The school was named for the explorer John C. Frémont.

== Athletics ==
Fremont is a member of the Utah High School Activities Association (UHSAA) competing in Class 6A - the largest class in Utah. With the 2025-26 realignment changes approaching, it is anticipated Fremont will jump to the 5A Classification with the reduction of its enrollment numbers (Due to the opening of a new high school within what was formerly Fremont's school boundaries. See "Recent Changes" section below for more details.)

- Utah Region 1 football champions in 2005, 2006, 2010, 2011, 2016, 2018 and 2024
- 2nd in Utah State Football Championships in 1995, 2010, and 2011
- 2014 5A Girls' Basketball State Champions (Girls' team took 2nd in Dick's Sporting Goods Girl's High School National Championships)
- 2018 6A Girls’ Basketball State Champions
- 2021 6A Girls' Basketball State Champions
- 2020 6A Boys’ Basketball State Champions
- 2005 5A Boys' Basketball State Champions
- 2014 and 2016 5A Girls' Soccer State Runners Up
- 2014 5A Girls' Volleyball 3rd place
- 2003 5A Wrestling State Champions
- 2007 5A Boys' Baseball 3rd place

== Choirs ==
Fremont Choirs have made 40 State Festival Appearances. Six choirs are maintained:

- Legacy Chamber Choir
- A'Capella Choir
- Silver Serenade
- Silver Notes
- Men's Chorus
- Handbell Choir

== Notable alumni/alumnae ==
- Zac Blair, PGA golfer
- Courtney Brown, professional soccer player
- Ky Bush, MLB pitcher, Chicago White Sox
- Timea Gardiner, NCAA Women's Basketball player
- David Hale, former NFL offensive lineman, Baltimore Ravens
- Marybai Huking, paralympic goalball player
- Salesi Moa, college football wide receiver, Michigan Wolverines
- Nick Vigil, NFL linebacker for the Dallas Cowboys
- Zach Vigil, NFL linebacker

== Rivalries ==
Their most notable rivals are fellow Weber County schools Weber High School and Roy High School due to their close proximity and the vast majority of Fremont students coming from Weber when Fremont opened in 1994. With subsequent boundary changes, Fremont has many students that previously attended either Roy and Weber High Schools adding the shared sense of rivalry.

== Recent changes ==
In the fall of 2024, West Field High School opened in Taylor, Utah. This resulted in approximately 600-700 Fremont students switching to the new school, significantly reducing Fremont's enrollment numbers.
