= Chris Bracy =

American football player (born 2005)

No. 7 – Michigan Wolverines
- Position: Safety
- Class: Senior

Personal information
- Born: October 20, 2005 (age 21)
- Listed height: 6 ft 1 in (1.85 m)
- Listed weight: 200 lb (91 kg)

Career information
- High school: St. Paul's Episcopal School (Mobile, Alabama)
- College: UAB (2023–2024); Memphis (2025); Michigan (2026–present)
- Stats at ESPN

Christopher Bracy (born October 20, 2005) is an American college football safety for the Michigan Wolverines. He previously played for the UAB Blazers and Memphis Tigers.

== Early life ==
Bracy attended St. Paul's Episcopal School in Mobile, Alabama. He committed to play college football at the University of Alabama at Birmingham (UAB).

== College career ==
Bracy played in 15 games with two starts at UAB in 2023 and 2024, recording 35 tackles and one interception. After the 2024 season, he entered the transfer portal and committed to the University of Memphis. In his lone season with Memphis in 2025, he started 11 of 13 games and had 81 tackles with an interception. After the season, Bracy entered the transfer portal again and committed to the University of Michigan. He entered his first season at Michigan in 2026 as a starter. On October 19, Bracy earned Big Ten Conference Defensive Player of the Week honors against Penn State. He recorded eight tackles, one sack, one forced fumble and an interception.
