= Salesi Moa =

American football player (born 2007)

No. 12 – Michigan Wolverines
- Position: Wide receiver
- Class: Freshman

Personal information
- Born: December 4, 2007 (age 18)
- Listed height: 6 ft 2 in (1.88 m)
- Listed weight: 186 lb (84 kg)

Career information
- High school: Weber (Pleasant View, Utah); Fremont (Plain City, Utah)
- College: Michigan (2026–present)

Salesi Moa (born December 4, 2007) is an American college football wide receiver for the Michigan Wolverines.

== Early life ==
Moa began his high school career at Weber High School in Pleasant View, Utah. He was a two-way player, playing both wide receiver and safety. During his freshman season, he had 49 receptions for 865 yards and seven touchdowns. During his sophomore season, he had 56 receptions for 820 yards and 11 touchdowns. Defensively he had 31 tackles with one interception. He transferred to Fremont High School in Plain City, Utah following his sophomore season. During his junior season, he recorded 800 receiving yards, along with 40 tackles, two interceptions and one fumble recovery. During his senior season, he had 63 receptions for 1,272 yards and 16 touchdowns. Following the season he was named the All-Region 5 MVP. He finished his high school career with 226 receptions, for 3,757 yards and 44 touchdowns.

He was a consensus four-star recruit and unanimously ranked the No. 1 player in the state of Utah. On July 31, 2025, he committed to play college football for the Tennessee Volunteers. However, on December 3, 2025, he flipped his commitment to the Utah Utes, and officially signed with the team the next day. On January 27, 2026, during the final class of 2026 rankings, he was elevated to a five-star recruit by Rivals.com, and ranked the No. 30 overall recruit in the nation.

== College career ==
After Utah's head coach Kyle Whittingham left the program to become the head coach at the University of Michigan in late December 2025, Moa entered the NCAA transfer portal after temporarily enrolling early at Utah. As a result, he needed to transfer despite not formally joining the team. On January 16, 2026, Moa announced he would transfer to Michigan during the 2026 Polynesian Bowl, reuniting him with coach Whittingham. The next day, his brother Aisea transferred from Michigan State to Michigan.

Moa had his first career catch and touchdown each against the UTEP Miners, both thrown by fellow freshman Tommy Carr, which was also Carr’s first completion and touchdown pass. The touchdown was a 19-yard back-shoulder pass, with Moa dragging his toes along the sideline. He finished with two receptions for 23 yards and a touchdown.

== Personal life ==
Moa was born to Ben and Christina Moa. His father played college football at Utah. His brothers, Sione and Aisea, are both football players.
