= Cam Brown (punter) =

Australian football player

No. 33 – Michigan Wolverines
- Position: Punter
- Class: Sophomore

Personal information
- Born: c. 2007
- Listed height: 6 ft 3 in (1.91 m)
- Listed weight: 185 lb (84 kg)

Career information
- High school: Palm Beach Corrumbin State
- College: UNLV (2025); Michigan (2026–present)
- Stats at ESPN

Cameron Brown (born c. 2007) is an Australian college football punter for the Michigan Wolverines. He previously played for the UNLV Rebels in 2025.

== Early life ==
Brown grew up in Coolangatta, Queensland, and attended Palm Beach Currumbin State High School in Australia's Gold Coast. He played Australian football with the Queensland state team and won four championships.

== College career ==
Brown moved to the United States for college football and attended the University of Nevada, Las Vegas (UNLV) during his first year. As a freshman at UNLV, Brown punted 22 times for 943 yards, an average of 42.9 yards. He had a season-long 71-yard punt against Wyoming on October 4, 2025.

Brown transferred to the University of Michigan in 2026 as a sophomore. In his first game, he punted six times with a long of 50 yards and had two punts downed inside Western Michigan's 20-yard line. In his second game for Michigan, Brown had six punts downed inside Oklahoma's 20-yard line, including two downed at the one-yard line.
