= Nathaniel Staehling =

American football player

No. 44 – Michigan Wolverines
- Position: Linebacker
- Class: Senior

Personal information
- Born: Baxter, Minnesota, U.S.
- Listed height: 6 ft 3 in (1.91 m)
- Listed weight: 241 lb (109 kg)

Career information
- High school: Brainerd (Brainerd, Minnesota)
- College: North Dakota State (2022–2025); Michigan (2026–present)

Awards and highlights
- FCS national champion (2024)
- Stats at ESPN

Nathaniel Staehling is an American college football linebacker for the Michigan Wolverines. He previously played for the North Dakota State Bison.

== Early life ==
Staehling attended Brainerd High School in Brainerd, Minnesota. He committed to play college football for the North Dakota State Bison over an offer from North Dakota.

== College career ==
=== North Dakota State ===
As a freshman in 2022, Staehling did not play in any games and was redshirted. During the 2023 season, he recorded 12 tackles and a pass deflection in 14 games. In 2024, he posted four tackles with one for loss and a fumble recovery in five games. In the second round of the FCS Playoffs, Staehling recorded two interceptions and a touchdown in a loss to Illinois State. He finished the 2025 season with 75 tackles with six for loss, a sack and a half, a fumble recovery, four pass deflections, three interceptions, and a touchdown. After the season, Staehling entered the NCAA transfer portal.

=== Michigan ===
In 2026, Staehling transferred to play for the Michigan Wolverines.
