= Brady Smigiel =

American football player (born 2006)

No. 17 – Michigan Wolverines
- Position: Quarterback
- Class: Freshman

Personal information
- Born: October 10, 2006 (age 20)
- Listed height: 6 ft 4 in (1.93 m)
- Listed weight: 217 lb (98 kg)

Career information
- High school: Newbury Park (Newbury Park, California)
- College: Michigan (2026–present)

Brady Smigiel (born October 10, 2006) is an American college football quarterback for the Michigan Wolverines.

== Biography ==
Brady Smigiel was born on October 10, 2006, along with his twin brother, Beau. He grew up in Newbury Park, California and attended Newbury Park High School, playing high school football as a quarterback under his head coach and father, Joe. Smigiel also played basketball at Newbury Park.

As a freshman, Smigiel started and threw for 3,479 yards and 46 touchdowns with 11 interceptions that year. As a sophomore, Smigiel threw for 4,222 yards and 52 touchdowns, setting the Ventura County single-season passing touchdowns record, while also becoming his school's career-leader in touchdown passes. He was named the Ventura County Star All-County Offensive Player of the Year and led Newbury Park to the finals in the Division 5 state playoffs. As a junior, Smigiel threw for 3,521 yards and 49 touchdowns with three interceptions, leading his team to a 14–1 record and the Southern Section Division 2 title, while also being named the Los Angeles Times Player of the Year. He was also the Cal-Hi Sports Mr. Football Award winner.

Smigiel initially committed to play college football for the Florida State Seminoles, but retracted his commitment in January 2025. He went on to switch his commitment to the Michigan Wolverines. As a senior, he passed for over 1,600 yards with 15 touchdowns before tearing his ACL and missing most of his final season.
