= Savion Hiter =

American football player (born 2008)

No. 5 – Michigan Wolverines
- Position: Running back
- Class: Freshman

Personal information
- Born: May 1, 2008 (age 18)
- Listed height: 5 ft 11 in (1.80 m)
- Listed weight: 212 lb (96 kg)

Career information
- High school: Louisa County (Mineral, Virginia); Woodberry Forest (Madison County, Virginia)
- College: Michigan (2026–present)

Savion Hiter (HY-ter; born May 1, 2008) is an American college football running back for the Michigan Wolverines.

== Early life ==
Hiter was born on May 1, 2008, the son of Rod Hiter and Aisha Scott-Hiter. He attended Louisa County High School in Mineral, Virginia for his freshman year, before transferring to Woodberry Forest School in Madison County, Virginia for his sophomore year. As a sophomore, he rushed for 1,187 yards and 11 touchdowns. As a junior, Hiter transferred back to Louisa County for his final years. In 2024, he ran for 1,698 yards on 156 carries with 26 touchdowns and was named Central Virginia's 2024 Offensive Player of the Year. After the season, Hiter was selected to play in the 2025 Under Armour All-America Game. In 2025, he rushed for 1,445 yards and 25 touchdowns as a senior.

As a five-star recruit, Hiter was rated as the consensus number one overall running back in the 2026 recruiting class. He committed to play college football for the Michigan Wolverines. Hiter signed a name, image, and likeness deal worth $800,000 as an true freshman, which would go on to rank him as the highest paid running back in the Big Ten Conference that season and top-seven amongst all college football running backs in 2026.

== College career ==
In January 2026, Hiter enrolled early at the University of Michigan. To start his freshman season, he earned the second string running back role behind Jordan Marshall. In week three against the UTEP Miners, Hiter scored his first two career touchdowns and rushed for a total of 62 yards on 11 attempts.
