= Jim Harding (American football) =

American football coach

Current position
- Title: Interim offensive coordinator, offensive line & assistant head coach
- Team: Michigan
- Conference: Big Ten

Biographical details
- Born: Maumee, Ohio, U.S.
- Education: University of Missouri; University of Toledo

Playing career
- 1997–2000: Toledo
- Position: Offensive tackle

Coaching career (HC unless noted)
- 2002–2004: Missouri (GA)
- 2005–2006: Troy Athens HS (MI) (DC)
- 2007–2008: Troy Athens HS (MI) (HC/DC)
- 2009–2011: Wyoming (Co-OL)
- 2012: Wyoming (Co-OL/run game coordinator)
- 2013: Wyoming (Co-OC/OL)
- 2014: Utah (OL)
- 2015–2016: Utah (Co-OC/OL)
- 2017–2025: Utah (AHC/OL)
- 2026–present: Michigan (Interim OC/AHC/OL)

Jim Harding is an American college football coach, currently the interim offensive coordinator, offensive line and assistant head coach at the University of Michigan. He previously held positions as offensive line coach, assistant head coach and co-offensive coordinator at the University of Utah between 2014 to 2025.

== Early life ==
Harding grew up in Maumee, Ohio, near Toledo, Ohio, and attended Maumee High School. Harding played both football and basketball. The University of Toledo recruited him as a football player, although head coach Gary Pinkel was also impressed with Harding's talents as a basketball player. Harding played offensive tackle and started 46 consecutive games between 1997–2000. He was inducted into the Toledo Athletics Hall of Fame in 2013.

== Coaching career ==
Gary Pinkel departed Toledo after the 2000 season to become the head coach at Missouri. Harding followed him there, serving as a graduate assistant from 2002–2004. While at Missouri, Harding earned a master's degree in career and technical education. From 2005–2006 he was the defensive coordinator at Troy Athens High School in Troy, Michigan, and was elevated to head coach for the 2007 and 2008 seasons.

Harding returned to the college ranks in 2009 as the co-offensive line coach (with Pete Kaligis) at Wyoming under first-year head coach Dave Christensen. Christensen was offensive coordinator at Toledo from 1997–2000 and then at Missouri from 2001–2008. Harding added the title of run game coordinator in 2012. The departure of offensive coordinator Gregg Brandon after the 2012 season led a shake-up of the offensive staff. Christensen took over play-calling, Kaligis and Harding moved up to co-offensive coordinator, and Harding became the sole offensive line coach.

Wyoming fired Christensen after the 2013 season. Utah, under long-time head coach Kyle Whittingham, hired Christensen as its offensive coordinator and Harding as its offensive line coach, replacing Dan Finn. Christensen left after the 2014 season to become the run game coordinator at Texas A&M. Whittingham promoted Harding and Aaron Roderick to co-offensive coordinators. Utah fired Roderick after the 2016 season and hired Troy Taylor as sole offensive coordinator. Harding was given the title of assistant head coach and continued to coach the offensive line.

Kyle Whittingham stepped down from Utah after the 2025 season and subsequently became head coach at Michigan. Harding was one of several assistants that followed Whittingham to Michigan, and was again assistant head coach and offensive line coach. Michigan fired offensive coordinator Jason Beck on November 8, 2026, and named Harding interim offensive coordinator.
