= Plain City, Utah =

City in Utah, United States

- City
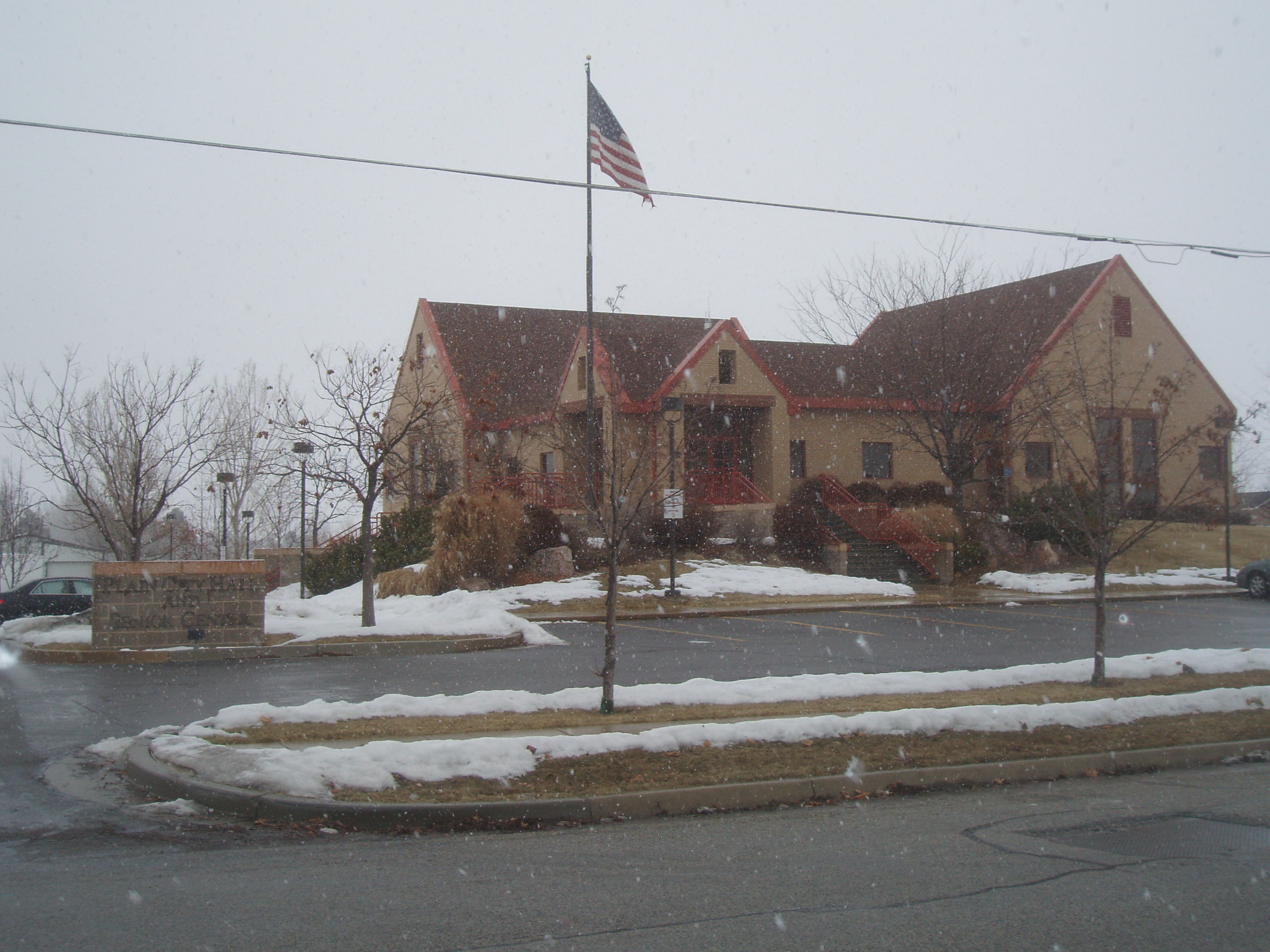
- Plain City Hall and Senior Center

- Location in Weber County and the state of Utah

- Location of Utah in the United States
- Coordinates: 41°17′58″N 112°4′49″W
- Country: United States
- State: Utah
- County: Weber
- Settled: 1859
- Incorporated: 1944

Government
  - Type: Council-Mayor

Area
  - Total: 12.21 sq mi (31.62 km^{2})
  - Land: 11.99 sq mi (31.05 km^{2})
  - Water: 0.22 sq mi (0.57 km^{2})
- Elevation: 4,242 ft (1,293 m)

Population (2020)
  - Total: 7,833
  - Estimate (2022): 8,321
  - Density: 640/sq mi (247/km^{2})
- Time zone: UTC-7 (MST)
  - Summer (DST): UTC-6 (MDT)
- ZIP code: 84404
- Area codes: 385, 801
- FIPS code: 49-60710
- GNIS feature ID: 2411435
- Website: www.plaincityutah.gov

Plain City is a city in Weber County, Utah, United States. The population was 7,833 at the 2020 census. It is part of the Ogden–Clearfield, Utah Metropolitan Statistical Area.

== History ==
The Salt Lake Valley settlement began when wagon trains of members of the Church of Jesus Christ of Latter-day Saints began arriving in 1847. By 1858, farmers from the then-settled towns of Lehi and Kay's Creek, looking for a new place to homestead, began considering the area now known as Plain City. On 17 March 1859, led by Lorin Farr, a group arrived to begin homesteading. Soon after arriving, the group surveyed a townsite and assigned building lots. The town layout used an organized grid system of blocks and streets, originally six blocks north-to-south and three blocks east-to-west. Each block was 5 acres (20,000 m^{2}) in area, divided into 4 lots. The first settlers were allowed their choice in the selection of a lot.

=== Trucking ===
Plain City residents were responsible for the creation and growth of several nationwide trucking companies:

- Maude Knight married Chester Rodney England in 1916; he founded C.R. England Trucking in 1920 to haul produce for nearby farmers.
- Carl Moyes, a driver for C.R. England in the 1940s, and his two sons, Jerry and Ronald, were childhood friends with Jeff England, son of Gene and grandson of Chester. Carl would leave C.R. England to found his own company with his wife, Betty, B & C Truck Leasing.
- Carl and Betty hired the Knight cousins to drive for them. Carl and his two sons relocated to Phoenix, Arizona in 1966, and founded Common Market, a trucking company which was known as Swift Transportation by 1969.
- Jeff England started Pride Transport in 1979 in Salt Lake City.
- Brothers Kevin and Keith Knight, and two of their cousins who had driven for Swift Transportation in Phoenix, Randy and Gary Knight, banded together to start Knight Transportation in 1990.

== Geography ==
According to the United States Census Bureau, the city has a total area of 11.73 square miles and 0.23 square miles of water.

Plain City is bordered by Farr West to the east, South Willard to the north, Marriott-Slaterville to the south, and the unincorporated townships of Warren and West Weber to the southwest.

== Demographics ==
Historical population
Census	Pop.	Note	%±
1870	440		—
1880	653		48.4%
1890	829		27.0%
1900	829		0.0%
1910	779		−6.0%
1920	780		0.1%
1930	806		3.3%
1940	822		2.0%
1950	829		0.9%
1960	1,152		39.0%
1970	1,543		33.9%
1980	2,379		54.2%
1990	2,722		14.4%
2000	3,489		28.2%
2010	5,476		57.0%
2020	7,833		43.0%
2022 (est.)	8,321		6.2%
U.S. Decennial Census

=== 2020 census ===
As of the 2020 census, Plain City had a population of 7,833, representing a 43% increase from the 2010 census. The median age was 33.0 years, with 32.7% of residents under the age of 18 and 10.9% of residents 65 years of age or older. For every 100 females there were 100.0 males, and for every 100 females age 18 and over there were 100.3 males age 18 and over.

95.3% of residents lived in urban areas, while 4.7% lived in rural areas.

There were 2,320 households in Plain City, of which 49.7% had children under the age of 18 living in them. Of all households, 77.5% were married-couple households, 8.2% were households with a male householder and no spouse or partner present, and 11.2% were households with a female householder and no spouse or partner present. About 10.2% of all households were made up of individuals and 4.8% had someone living alone who was 65 years of age or older.

There were 2,349 housing units, of which 1.2% were vacant. The homeowner vacancy rate was 0.3% and the rental vacancy rate was 1.5%.

Racial composition as of the 2020 census
Race	Number	Percent
White	7,170	91.5%
Black or African American	32	0.4%
American Indian and Alaska Native	23	0.3%
Asian	45	0.6%
Native Hawaiian and Other Pacific Islander	8	0.1%
Some other race	172	2.2%
Two or more races	383	4.9%
Hispanic or Latino (of any race)	445	5.7%

=== Recent estimates ===
According to 2022 estimates, 29.4% of Plain City residents hold a bachelor's degree or higher, noticeably lower than the Utah state average of 37.9%. Of the 2,349 housing units in the city, 2,271 are family households. The median income for all residents was $120,250, significantly higher than the estimated average taken at the 2000 Census. Poverty rates were also considerably lower than the Utah average with Plain City having 3.6% of its population living in poverty compared to Utah's 8.2%. Employment rates sat at 69.7%, slightly higher than the Utah average of 67.8%. Plain City's health care coverage rates are also better than the state average, with only 1.4% of Plain City without coverage compared to the Utah average of 8.1%. The median age of Plain City was reported to be 35.1 years old.

=== 2000 census ===
According to the 2000 census, there were 3,489 people, 979 households, and 868 families residing in the city. The population density was 935.3 people per square mile (361.2/km^{2}). There were 1,001 housing units at an average density of 268.3 per square mile (103.6/km^{2}). The racial makeup of the city was 97.39% White, 0.03% African American, 0.32% Native American, 0.49% Asian, 0.03% Pacific Islander, 0.63% from other races, and 1.12% from two or more races. Hispanic or Latino of any race were 2.03% of the population.

There were 979 households, out of which 52.9% had children under the age of 18 living with them, 80.3% were married couples living together, 6.3% had a female householder with no husband present, and 11.3% were non-families. 10.1% of all households were made up of individuals, and 4.5% had someone living alone who was 65 years of age or older. The average household size was 3.56 and the average family size was 3.84.

In the city, the population was spread out, with 36.4% under the age of 18, 11.6% from 18 to 24, 26.9% from 25 to 44, 18.8% from 45 to 64, and 6.4% who were 65 years of age or older. The median age was 27 years. For every 100 females, there were 103.0 males. For every 100 females age 18 and over, there were 99.1 males.

The median income for a household in the city was $57,601, and the median income for a family was $60,000. Males had a median income of $41,477 versus $26,532 for females. The per capita income for the city was $17,688. About 1.3% of families and 2.0% of the population were below the poverty line, including 2.4% of those under age 18 and none of those age 65 or over.

== Education ==
The original Plain City Elementary, built in 1906, was abandoned in 2007 to make way for the new building. Fremont High School, built in 1994, is located in Plain City. Fremont High School is a high school in Weber School District.
