= Jason Beck (American football) =

American football coach (born 1980)

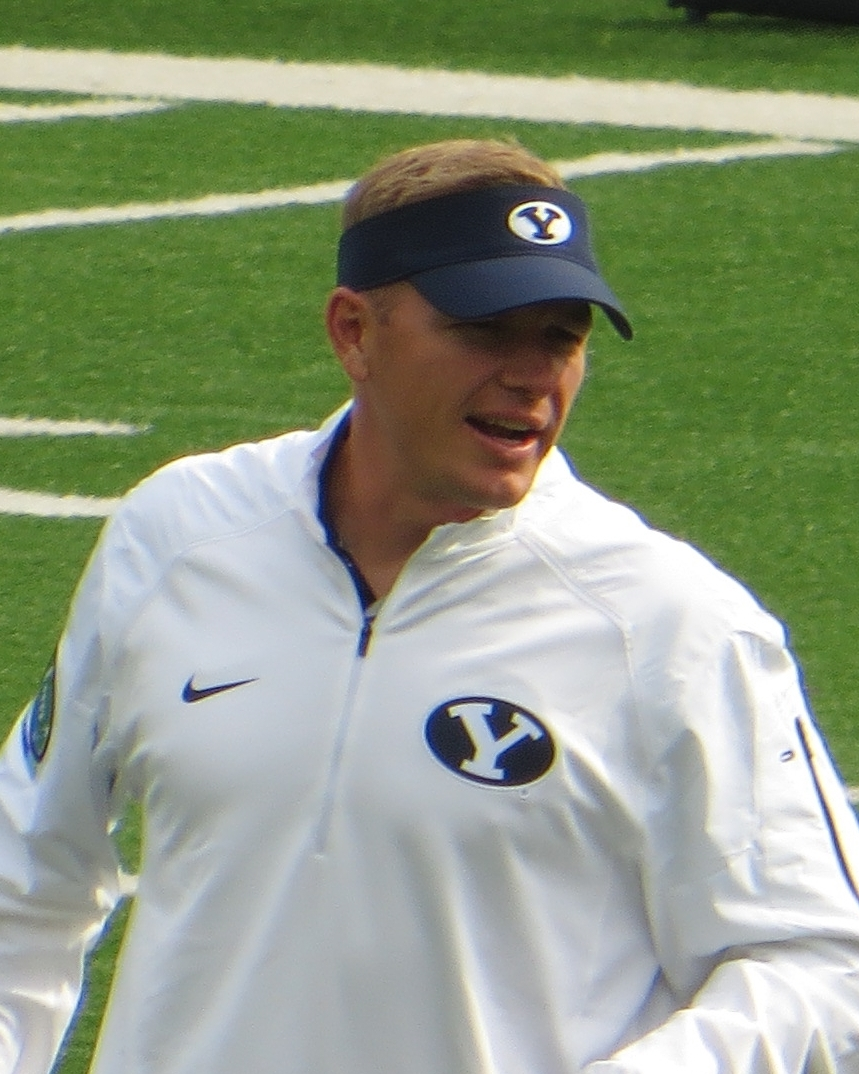
- Beck in 2015

Biographical details
- Born: April 1, 1980 (age 46); Oxnard, California, U.S.

Playing career
- 2002: College of the Canyons
- 2003: Ventura
- 2004–2006: BYU
- Position: Quarterback

Coaching career (HC unless noted)
- 2007: BYU (GA)
- 2008: LSU (GA)
- 2009–2011: Weber State (QB)
- 2012: Simon Fraser (OC)
- 2013–2015: BYU (QB)
- 2016–2021: Virginia (QB)
- 2022: Syracuse (QB)
- 2023: Syracuse (OC/QB)
- 2024: New Mexico (OC/QB)
- 2025: Utah (OC/QB)
- 2026: Michigan (OC/QB)

Jason Michael Beck (born April 1, 1980) is an American college football coach and former player. He previously served as the offensive coordinator and quarterbacks coach at Syracuse University, University of New Mexico, University of Utah and the University of Michigan.

== Early life and playing career ==
Beck was born in Oxnard, California, to John and Mary Beck. He attended Hueneme High School. Beck served a two-year mission in Denver for the Church of Jesus Christ of Latter-day Saints from 1999 to 2001, prior to his collegiate career.

Beck spent his freshman season at Ventura College and then moved to the College of the Canyons in Santa Clarita, California, where he led the Canyon Cougars to an 11-1 season and Western State Conference title as a sophomore. He was a unanimous first-team All-Conference pick, throwing for 2,052 yards while completing 77.5% of his passes. He also added 430 rushing yards. He was also named to the Junior college Academic All-American list.

After transferring to BYU, Beck served as the backup to All-American quarterback John Beck (no relation) from 2004 to 2006. In his lone start in a 38–0 victory over Utah State in 2006, Beck completed 20 of 28 passes for 305 yards and one touchdown.

== Coaching career ==
=== Quarterbacks coached ===
Beck has coached three quarterbacks who have gone on to play in the National Football League (NFL): Taysom Hill, Kurt Benkert, and Bryce Perkins.

=== Early years ===
Beck began coaching as an offensive intern at BYU in 2007, and then worked in the same position with the LSU Tigers in 2008. He worked under former BYU head coach, Gary Crowton, the offensive coordinator (OC) for Les Miles that season.

=== Weber State ===
In 2009, he was hired by head coach Ron McBride as quarterbacks coach at Weber State. He coached quarterback Cameron Higgins, who completed his four-year standout career as one of the top players in Weber State history and set school records.

=== Simon Fraser ===
In 2012, Beck was named the OC at Simon Fraser (SFU) in Burnaby, British Columbia, Canada. At SFU, he turned around the offense, going from being ranked last in the Great Northwest Athletic Conference in 2011, to ranked first in total offense, passing offense and scoring offense in 2012.

=== BYU ===
In 2013, he returned to his alma mater as quarterbacks coach until his resignation on December 9, 2015. He was hired by offensive coordinator Robert Anae.

=== Virginia ===
Beck accepted the quarterbacks coach position at the University of Virginia in 2016. Going from BYU with OC Robert Anae and head coach Bronco Mendenhall. Beck left this position after the 2021 season when Mendenhall announced his retirement.

=== Syracuse ===
Beck was hired as Syracuse's quarterbacks coach on December 26, 2021. In December 2022, Anae left for the same position at NC State, and Beck was promoted to OC by head coach Dino Babers. In his only season as the OC at Syracuse, they went 6–7.

=== New Mexico ===
In December 2023, Beck was named the OC at New Mexico, joining head coach Bronco Mendenhall. This was the third time Beck had worked with him, following from BYU and Virginia. In November 2024, Beck was named to the 65-man shortlist of the Broyles Award, which honors the best assistant coach in college football.

=== Utah ===
On December 5, 2024, Beck was hired as the offensive coordinator at Utah by Kyle Whittingham. In his only season at Utah, the Utes ranked fifth nationally scoring 41.1 points per game, and second nationally averaging 270 rushing yards per game. Utah finished the season with an 11–2 record.

=== Michigan ===
In January 2026, Beck was hired as the offensive coordinator by the University of Michigan. He followed Whittingham, who was hired as the head coach of the Wolverines. Despite being named the top coordinator hire of the 2026 cycle by CBS Sports, sentiment turned on Beck by October. After a 13–6 loss in overtime to Indiana in Michigan's seventh game of the season, the Wolverines dropped to 130th out of 138 NCAA Division I Football Bowl Subdivision (FBS) teams in total offense per game. Austin Meek of The Athletic stated Beck "looks like a bust." Two weeks prior to Meek's article, Bruce Feldman, also of The Athletic, published a story that cited coaches, scouts, and television analysts who blamed Beck's schematic shift for the team's decline in offensive output. On November 8, 2026, Beck was fired by Michigan after the team lost to Michigan State, 15–6. At the time of his firing, Michigan ranked 132th in total offense, 126th in points per game, 109th in rushing offense, 125th in passing offense, 124th in total first downs, and 129th in red zone offense.

== Personal life ==
Beck married Jaime Rendich, an All-American BYU soccer standout, in December 2005. They are the parents of a daughter and twin sons. Beck earned bachelor's and master's degrees in communications from BYU in 2006 and 2011.
