= Carter Meadows =

American football player (born 2007)

No. 14 – Michigan Wolverines
- Position: Defensive end
- Class: Freshman

Personal information
- Born: November 19, 2007 (age 18)
- Listed height: 6 ft 7 in (2.01 m)
- Listed weight: 252 lb (114 kg)

Career information
- High school: Gonzaga (Washington, D.C.)
- College: Michigan (2026–present)

Carter Meadows (born November 19, 2007) is an American college football defensive end for the Michigan Wolverines.

== Early life ==
Meadows was born on November 19, 2007, the son of Mike and Cheri Meadows, and grew up in Bethesda, Maryland. He is the nephew of NBA coach, Randy Ayers. Meadows attended Gonzaga College High School, playing both football and basketball. He received collegiate offers to play basketball as well. Meadows had nine tackles as a freshman and 23 tackles as a sophomore in 2023. As a junior, he tallied 33 tackles and two sacks in six games in 2024. He was named honorable mention All-Met by The Washington Post in 2024 and first-team all-conference in 2025.

Meadows was a five-star prospect and the top recruit in Washington, D.C. He was a consensus top-10 prospect nationally, ranked sixth overall by 247Sports. He committed to former head coach Sherrone Moore to play college football for the Michigan Wolverines. He signed in December 2025.

== College career ==
In June 2026, Meadows enrolled at the University of Michigan to play for new head coach Kyle Whittingham. In August fall camp Meadows sustained an injury, forcing him to miss the first two games of his freshman season. He made his collegiate debut in week three against the UTEP Miners and immediately joined the defensive line rotation, recording his first career tackle.
