= Jordan Marshall (American football) =

American football player (born 2005)

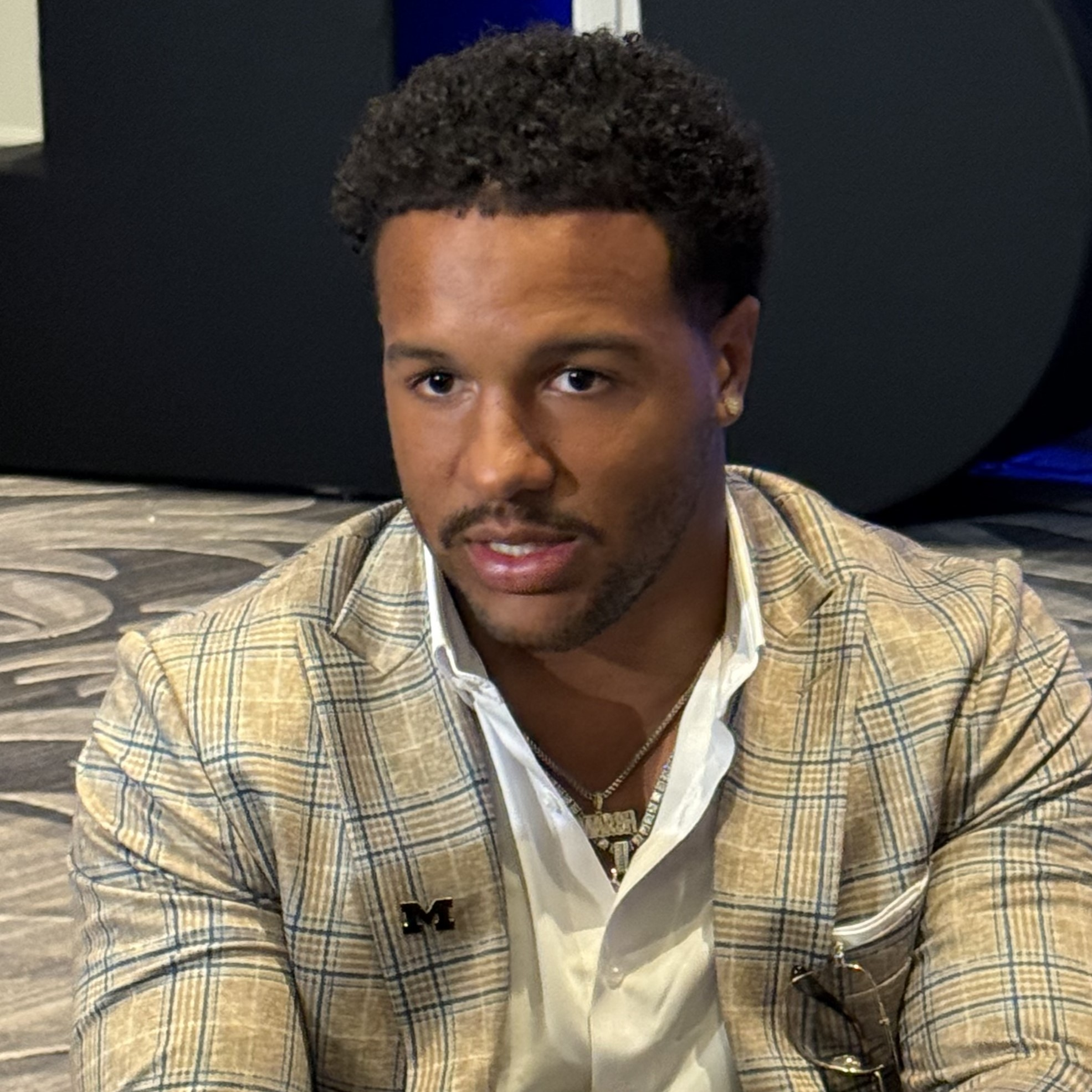
- Marshall at 2026 Big Ten Media Day

No. 23 – Michigan Wolverines
- Position: Running back
- Class: Junior

Personal information
- Born: November 2, 2005 (age 21)
- Listed height: 5 ft 10 in (1.78 m)
- Listed weight: 220 lb (100 kg)

Career information
- High school: Moeller (Cincinnati, Ohio)
- College: Michigan (2024–present)

Awards and highlights
- Second-team All-Big Ten (2025); Ohio Mr. Football (2023)
- Stats at ESPN

Jordan Marshall (born November 2, 2005) is an American college football running back for the Michigan Wolverines.

== Early life ==
Marshall was on born November 2, 2005, the son of Jarelle Marshall and Amy Allphin, and attended Moeller High School in Cincinnati, Ohio. As a junior in 2022, he was selected as the Ohio Gatorade Player of the Year, tallying 1,951 rushing yards, 364 receiving yards and 33 total touchdowns. As a senior, in 13 games he rushed for 1,550 yards and 17 touchdowns, as well as had 30 receptions for 394 yards and an additional four touchdowns. Following the season, he received the 2023 Ohio Mr. Football Award. He finished his high school career with 4,787 total rushing yards. He was a four-star recruit, ranked as the No. 4 running back and the No. 78 overall player in the country in 247Sports composite rankings. He had offers from numerous schools, including Ohio State, Michigan State, Tennessee and Wisconsin. In March 2023, he announced his commitment to play college football for the Michigan Wolverines.

== University of Michigan ==
=== Freshman (2024) ===
In June 2024, Marshall enrolled at the University of Michigan. In his freshman season, he had eight carries for 20 yards in the regular season. Against Northwestern on November 23, he also returned a kick 63 yards. On December 31, 2024, Marshall got his first career start in the ReliaQuest Bowl against No. 11 Alabama, tallying 100 yards on 23 carries. As a result, he received the most valuable player award. After the bowl game, Michigan head coach Sherrone Moore called Marshall "a special back" whose hard work "makes him different."

=== Sophomore (2025) ===
As a sophomore in 2025, Marshall began the season as the second running back, splitting time behind Justice Haynes. In game three against Central Michigan, Marshall scored his first two touchdowns of the season, rushing ten times for 52 yards. In game four against Nebraska, he had six carries for 80 yards, including a 54-yard touchdown. In game seven against Washington, Marshall earned his first start of the season, finishing with 25 carries for 133 yard and a touchdown. In game eight against Michigan State, he rushed 16 times for 110 yards and a touchdown as the Wolverines defeated their instate rival. In game nine against Purdue, Marshall was elevated as the starting running back after Haynes had surgery on his foot, and rushed for his third consecutive 100-yard game. Marshall had 25 carries for a career-high 185 yards and three touchdowns, finishing with 210 total yards. He was named the Big Ten Co-Offensive Player of the Week following the game. In game ten against Northwestern, Marshall rushed for his third straight 100-yard game, carrying the ball 19 times for 142 yards and two touchdowns before leaving the game with a shoulder injury.

=== Junior (2026) ===
In 2026, Marshall was voted by his teammates as a captain, an honor typically reserved for seniors.
