= 2026 Indiana Hoosiers football team =

American college football season

2026 Indiana Hoosiers football
- Conference: Big Ten Conference

Ranking
- Coaches: No. 12
- AP: No. 12
- CFP: No. 8
- Record: 9–2 (6–2 Big Ten)
- Head coach: Curt Cignetti (3rd season)
- Offensive coordinator: Mike Shanahan (3rd season)
- Co-offensive coordinator: Tino Sunseri (2nd season)
- Offensive scheme: Pro spread
- Defensive coordinator: Bryant Haines (3rd season)
- Base defense: Multiple 4–2–5
- Home stadium: Memorial Stadium

2026 Big Ten Conference football standings
	Conf.			Overall
Team	W		L	W		L
No. 4 UCLA	7	–	1	10	–	1
No. 8 Indiana	6	–	2	9	–	2
No. 15 Iowa	6	–	2	9	–	2
No. 13 Oregon	6	–	2	8	–	3
No. 18 USC	5	–	3	8	–	3
No. 14 Ohio State	5	–	3	7	–	4
Wisconsin	5	–	3	7	–	4
Nebraska	4	–	4	7	–	4
Washington	4	–	4	7	–	4
Illinois	4	–	4	6	–	5
Minnesota	4	–	4	6	–	5
Michigan	3	–	5	6	–	5
Northwestern	3	–	5	6	–	5
Penn State	3	–	5	6	–	5
Maryland	2	–	6	4	–	7
Purdue	2	–	6	3	–	8
Rutgers	2	–	6	3	–	8
Michigan State	1	–	7	3	–	8
Championship: December 5, 2026
^ – College Football Playoff participant; $ – Conference champion; y – Championship game participant; As of November 22, 2026; Rankings from CFP rankings

The 2026 Indiana Hoosiers football team is the program that represents Indiana University Bloomington (Indiana or IU) during the 2026 NCAA Division I FBS football season. The Hoosiers are led by their third-year head coach Curt Cignetti. They play home games at Memorial Stadium which is located in Bloomington, Indiana, as members of the Big Ten Conference.

Their hopes of another perfect season were dashed following a Week 7 home loss to Ohio State. As a result, the Hoosiers failed to match their 12–0 regular season record from 2025. It marked their first loss since the first playoff round of the 2024 season, and also marked the end of a 22-game winning streak. Furthermore, the Hoosiers' hopes of matching their 2024 regular season record were extinguished during Week 12, when they lost in overtime to the University of Washington's football team.

Indiana's Week 8 road win against Michigan was their first win in Ann Arbor since 1967. It also marked Indiana's first consecutive wins against Michigan since 1958 and 1959.

== Offseason ==
=== Departures ===
- RB Solomon Vanhorse
- WR Camden Jordan
- TE Holden Staes
- TE James Bomba
- OL Jack Greer
- DL Andrew Turvy
- DB Bryson Bonds
- DB Reece Bellin
- K Brendan Franke
- K/P Olubade Baker

==== NFL draft ====
At the 2026 NFL draft, a program record eight Hoosiers were selected. Six players were signed as undrafted free agents, while punter Mitch McCarthy was invited to the Patriots training camp. Wide receiver and punt returner Jonathan Brady and offensive lineman Kahlil Benson were initially invited to the Raiders and Chiefs training camps respectively, and were later signed as undrafted free agents.

Name	Pos.	Team	Round	Pick
Fernando Mendoza	QB	Las Vegas Raiders	1	1
Omar Cooper Jr.	WR	New York Jets	1	30
D'Angelo Ponds	CB	New York Jets	2	50
Kaelon Black	RB	San Francisco 49ers	3	90
Elijah Sarratt	WR	Baltimore Ravens	4	115
Riley Nowakowski	TE	Pittsburgh Steelers	5	169
Pat Coogan	C	Tennessee Titans	6	194
Aiden Fisher	LB	Houston Texans	7	243
Kahlil Benson	OL	Kansas City Chiefs	UDFA	
Devan Boykin	DB	Pittsburgh Steelers	UDFA	
Jonathan Brady	WR/PR	Las Vegas Raiders	UDFA	
Roman Hemby	RB	Las Vegas Raiders	UDFA	
Mikail Kamara	EDGE	San Francisco 49ers	UDFA	
Mark Langston	LS	Buffalo Bills	UDFA	
Louis Moore	S	Miami Dolphins	UDFA	
E. J. Williams Jr.	WR	Las Vegas Raiders	UDFA	

==== CFL Global Draft ====
Name	Pos.	Team	Round	Pick
Mitch McCarthy	P	Hamilton Tiger-Cats	2	14

==== Outgoing transfers ====
Name	No.	Pos.	Height	Weight	Year	Hometown	New school
Hosea Wheeler	0	DL	6'3"	300	Rs-SR	Sacramento, CA	Baylor
Makai Jackson	2	WR	6'0"	200	SR	Levittown, PA	Liberty
Jah Jah Boyd	16	DB	5'11"	173	FR	Philadelphia, PA	Colorado
Alberto Mendoza	16	QB	6'2"	207	Rs-FR	Miami, FL	Georgia Tech
Jackson Wasserstrom	17	WR	5'11"	175	FR	Westfield, IN	Withdrew/remained at IU
Dontrae Henderson	20	DB	5'11"	180	FR	Charlotte, NC	Arkansas State
Ace Ciongoli	22	WR	5'11"	190	FR	Needham, MA	Florida
Amariyun Knighten	23	DB	6'0"	174	JR	Hollywood, FL	Miami (OH)
Andrew DePaepe	42	DL	6'5"	250	Rs-SO	Bettendorf, IA	UMass
Finn Walters	47	DL	6'4"	247	SO	Indianapolis, IN	
Aden Cannon	58	DL	6'6"	268	JR	Carmel, IN	Illinois State
Mitch Verstegen	63	OL	6'4"	290	Fr	Kaukauna, WI	Northern Michigan
Evan Lawrence	71	OL	6'6"	281	FR	Danville, IN	San Diego State
J'mari Monette	80	DL	6'3"	285	JR	Alexandria, LA	Memphis
Bruno Massel IV	86	WR	5'11"	190	FR	Elmhurst, IL	Withdrew/remained at IU
William DePaepe	98	DL	6'6"	244	Rs-FR	Bettendorf, IA	UMass

==== Coaching departures ====
Name	Previous Position	New Position
Derek Owings	Indiana – Director of athletic performance, football	Tennessee – Director of football sports performance
Chandler Whitmer	Indiana – Co-offensive coordinator / quarterbacks coach	Tampa Bay Buccaneers – Quarterbacks coach

=== Acquisitions ===
==== Incoming transfers ====
Name	No.	Pos.	Height	Weight	Year	Hometown	Prev. school
Joe Brunner	56	OL	6'5"	318	JR	Whitefish Bay, WI	Wisconsin
Joshua Burnham	8	DL	6'4"	253	JR	Traverse City, MI	Notre Dame
Drew Clausen	49	LS	6'6"	260	SR	Grimes, IA	Iowa State
Billy Gowers	19	P	6'1"	205	FR	Melbourne, VIC	Hawaii
A. J. Harris	4	CB	6'1"	191	JR	Phenix City, AL	Penn State
Joe Hjelle	90	DL	6'3"	300	JR	Decorah, IA	Tulsa
Josh Hoover	10	QB	6'2"	200	RS-JR	Rockwall, TX	TCU
Nick Marsh	8	WR	6'3"	201	JR	River Rouge, MI	Michigan State
Paddy McAteer	35	K	6'3"	207	JR	Mullaghbawn, IE	Troy
Chiddi Obiazor	7	DE	6'6"	275	SO	Eden Prairie, MN	Kansas State
Tobi Osunsanmi	12	DE	6'3"	250	JR	Wichita, KS	Kansas State
Shazz Preston	7	WR	6'0"	206	RS-JR	St. James, LA	Tulane
Turbo Richard	1	RB	5'8"	207	SO	Charlotte, NC	Boston College
Quan Sanks	13	DB	5'10"	195	SO	Columbus, GA	Cincinnati
Brock Schott	88	TE	6'3"	245	FR	Leo, IN	Miami
Carson Williams	0	DB	5'11"	160	FR	Houston, TX	Montana State
Preston Zachman	6	S	6'1"	212	SR	Elysburg, PA	Wisconsin

==== Recruiting class ====
College recruiting (2026)
Name	Hometown	School	Height	Weight	Commit date
Gabe Hill; DL	Naperville, IL	Naperville North High School	6 ft 1 in (1.85 m)	280 lb (130 kg)	May 17, 2025
Gabe Hill; DL	Recruit ratings: Rivals: 247Sports: ESPN: (81)				
Cam McHaney; DL	Indianapolis, IN	IMG Academy	6 ft 1 in (1.85 m)	274 lb (124 kg)	Jul 1, 2025
Cam McHaney; DL	Recruit ratings: Rivals: 247Sports: ESPN: (81)				
Kevontay Hugan; DL	Sarasota, FL	Booker High School	6 ft 1 in (1.85 m)	227 lb (103 kg)	Jun 11, 2025
Kevontay Hugan; DL	Recruit ratings: Rivals: 247Sports: ESPN: (80)				
Henry Ohlinger; LB	Columbus, OH	Grandview Heights High School	6 ft 1 in (1.85 m)	216 lb (98 kg)	Apr 21, 2025
Henry Ohlinger; LB	Recruit ratings: Rivals: 247Sports: ESPN: (80)				
Ja'Dyn Williams; LB	Massillon, OH	Washington High School	6 ft 1 in (1.85 m)	205 lb (93 kg)	Jun 10, 2025
Ja'Dyn Williams; LB	Recruit ratings: Rivals: 247Sports: ESPN: (80)				
Kasmir Hicks; DB	Indianapolis, IN	Decatur Central High School	5 ft 11 in (1.80 m)	162 lb (73 kg)	Apr 25, 2025
Kasmir Hicks; DB	Recruit ratings: Rivals: 247Sports: ESPN: (79)				
Parker Elmore; TE	Columbus, IN	Columbus North High School	6 ft 4 in (1.93 m)	226 lb (103 kg)	Jan 9, 2025
Parker Elmore; TE	Recruit ratings: Rivals: 247Sports: ESPN: (79)				
Ronelle Johnson; DL	Blue Springs, MO	Blue Springs High School	6 ft 3 in (1.91 m)	269 lb (122 kg)	Jul 5, 2025
Ronelle Johnson; DL	Recruit ratings: Rivals: 247Sports: ESPN: (78)				
Trevor Gibbs; TE	Crown Point, IN	Crown Point High School	6 ft 2 in (1.88 m)	232 lb (105 kg)	May 7, 2025
Trevor Gibbs; TE	Recruit ratings: Rivals: 247Sports: ESPN: (78)				
Ben Novak; OL	Crown Point, IN	Andrean High School	6 ft 6 in (1.98 m)	320 lb (150 kg)	Nov 19, 2025
Ben Novak; OL	Recruit ratings: Rivals: 247Sports: ESPN: (78)				
Jamar Owens; DB	Douglasville, GA	Douglas County High School	6 ft 0 in (1.83 m)	165 lb (75 kg)	Jun 27, 2025
Jamar Owens; DB	Recruit ratings: Rivals: 247Sports: ESPN: (78)				
Kortez Rupert; WR	East St. Louis, IL	East St. Louis High School	5 ft 11 in (1.80 m)	156 lb (71 kg)	Jan 9, 2025
Kortez Rupert; WR	Recruit ratings: Rivals: 247Sports: ESPN: (78)				
Jayreon Campbell; RB	Powder Springs, GA	McEachern High School	5 ft 9 in (1.75 m)	200 lb (91 kg)	Jun 16, 2025
Jayreon Campbell; RB	Recruit ratings: Rivals: 247Sports: ESPN: (77)				
Jacob Savage; LB	Union, KY	Ryle High School	6 ft 0 in (1.83 m)	230 lb (100 kg)	Apr 25, 2025
Jacob Savage; LB	Recruit ratings: Rivals: 247Sports: ESPN: (77)				
D'Montae Tims; DB	Seffner, FL	Armwood High School	6 ft 0 in (1.83 m)	205 lb (93 kg)	Nov 20, 2025
D'Montae Tims; DB	Recruit ratings: Rivals: 247Sports: ESPN: (77)				
Sam Simpson; OL	River Falls, WI	River Falls High School	6 ft 3 in (1.91 m)	311 lb (141 kg)	Feb 1, 2025
Sam Simpson; OL	Recruit ratings: Rivals: 247Sports: ESPN: (76)				
Blake Smythe; DL	Trafalgar, IN	Franklin Community High School	6 ft 2 in (1.88 m)	281 lb (127 kg)	May 2, 2025
Blake Smythe; DL	Recruit ratings: Rivals: 247Sports: ESPN: (76)				
Rodney White; DL	Towson, MD	Concordia Preparatory School	6 ft 1 in (1.85 m)	156 lb (71 kg)	Apr 24, 2025
Rodney White; DL	Recruit ratings: Rivals: 247Sports: ESPN: (75)				
CJ Scifres; OL	Bargersville, IN	Center Grove High School	6 ft 5 in (1.96 m)	310 lb (140 kg)	Jun 14, 2025
CJ Scifres; OL	Recruit ratings: Rivals: 247Sports: ESPN: (74)				
Bryce Taylor; K	Bloomington, IN	Bloomington High School South	6 ft 0 in (1.83 m)	175 lb (79 kg)	Jan 9, 2025
Bryce Taylor; K	Recruit ratings: Rivals: 247Sports: ESPN: (73)				
Jackson Tolle; LS	Fishers, IN	Hamilton Southeastern High School	6 ft 0 in (1.83 m)	217 lb (98 kg)	Jun 25, 2025
Jackson Tolle; LS	Recruit ratings: ESPN: (69)				
Overall recruit ranking:
Note: In many cases, Scout, Rivals, 247Sports, On3, and ESPN may conflict in their listings of height and weight.; In these cases, the average was taken. ESPN grades are on a 100-point scale.; Sources:

College recruiting (2027)
Name	Hometown	School	Height	Weight	Commit date
Monshun Sales; WR	Indianapolis, IN	Lawrence North High School	6 ft 5 in (1.96 m)	195 lb (88 kg)	Jul 17, 2026
Monshun Sales; WR	Recruit ratings: Rivals: 247Sports: ESPN: (90)				
Overall recruit ranking:
Note: In many cases, Scout, Rivals, 247Sports, On3, and ESPN may conflict in their listings of height and weight.; In these cases, the average was taken. ESPN grades are on a 100-point scale.; Sources:

==== Walk-ons ====
Player	Number	Position	Height	Weight	Class	Hometown	Previous school
Maverick Geske	14	QB	6'0"	187	RS-Freshman	Indianapolis, IN	Brebeuf Jesuit Preparatory School
Cade Kaiser	26	WR	6'5"	214	RS-Freshman	Batesville, IN	Batesville High School
Iosua Stephens	26	DB	6'2"	185	RS-Freshman	Brownsburg, IN	Valparaiso
Anthony Chung	31	DB	6'1"	199	RS-Junior	Mequon, WI	Homestead High School
Jeff Utzinger	34	LB	6'3"	232	RS-Senior	Carmel, IN	Cathedral High School
Clay Conner	36	DB	6'4"	206	RS-Junior	Boonville, IN	Boonville High School
Heath Kizer	37	DB	6'1"	203	RS-Sophomore	Indianapolis, IN	North Central High School
Kaden McConnell	38	LB	6'2"	228	RS-Sophomore	Greenwood, IN	Center Grove High School
Bryce Taylor	43	K	5'10"	189	RS-Freshman	Bloomington, IN	Bloomington High School South
Sam Lindsey	45	LS	6'0"	188	RS-Junior	Lilburn, GA	Georgia State
Lincoln Murff	45	DB	5'10"	186	RS-Junior	Indianapolis, IN	Ben Davis High School
Jackson Tolle	47	LS	6'0"	220	Freshman	Fishers, IN	Hamilton Southeastern High School
Clayton Allen	52	LB	6'2"	209	RS-Junior	Fishers, IN	Hamilton Southeastern High School
Chance Johnson	64	OL	6'5"	305	RS-Freshman	Jeffersonville, IN	Jeffersonville High School
Luke Graham	73	OL	6'4"	315	Freshman	Pendleton, IN	Pendleton Heights High School
Prescott Horvath	78	OL	6'8"	280	Freshman	Mishawaka, IN	Marian High School
Jaidon Van Pelt	81	WR	5'11"	160	Freshman	Fort Wayne, IN	Carmel High School
Hunter Stroud	83	WR	6'0"	183	RS-Freshman	Martinsville, IN	Martinsville High School
Bruno Massel IV	86	WR	5'11"	196	RS-Freshman	Elmhurst, IL	York Community High School
Josh Placzek	90	K	5'11"	193	RS-Sophomore	Carmel, IN	Carmel High School
Quinn Warren	93	K	6'6"	214	Junior	Indianapolis, IN	Brebeuf Jesuit Preparatory School

==== Coaches acquisitions ====
Name	Previous Position	New Position
Tyson Brown	Colorado State – Strength and conditioning coach	Indiana – Director of athletic performance, football
Tino Sunseri	UCLA – Offensive coordinator and quarterbacks coach	Indiana – Co-offensive coordinator and quarterbacks coach

== Preseason ==
=== NFL Combine ===
Nine Hoosiers were invited to the 2026 NFL draft Combine, setting a program record. The players invited were Fernando Mendoza, Roman Hemby, Omar Cooper Jr., Elijah Sarratt, Riley Nowakowski, Pat Coogan, Aiden Fisher, Louis Moore, and D'Angelo Ponds. Coogan, Fisher, Hemby, Mendoza, Moore, and Sarratt did not participate in any combine tests. Ponds participated in the vertical jump, jumping 43.5 inches, 2nd among 2026 participants and 4th all-time amongst cornerbacks.

=== Pro Day ===
IU hosted its 2026 pro day at John Mellencamp Pavilion on April 1, 2026. Representatives from all NFL teams were in attendance, including Las Vegas Raiders coach Klint Kubiak. Over 100 media personnel were present, and the event was streamed live on ESPN and NFL Network. Events included the vertical jump, bench press, broad jump, 40y dash, shuttle/cone drills, and position drills.

Participants included:

- OL Kahlil Benson
- RB Kaelon Black
- DB Devan Boykin
- WR Jonathan Brady
- C Pat Coogan
- WR Omar Cooper Jr.
- DL Stephen Daley
- LB Aiden Fisher
- K Brendan Franke
- RB Roman Hemby
- DE Mikail Kamara
- LS Mark Langston
- P Mitch McCarthy
- QB Fernando Mendoza
- S Louis Moore
- TE Riley Nowakowski
- CB D'Angelo Ponds
- DL Dominique Ratcliff
- WR Elijah Sarratt
- TE Holden Staes
- RB Solomon Vanhorse
- WR E.J. Williams Jr.
- DL Kellan Wyatt

=== Spring game ===
The Hoosiers' spring game took place on Thursday, April 23 at 8 p.m. in Memorial Stadium. It was televised on Big Ten Network, and streamed live on YouTube TV and FuboTV. Roughly 21,000 attended.

First team:

- QB Josh Hoover
- RB Turbo Richard
- WR Nick Marsh
- WR LeBron Bond
- WR Davion Chandler
- TE Andrew Barker
- LT Adedamola Ajani
- LG Sam Simpson
- C Drew Evans
- RG Austin Leibfried
- RT Joe Brunner
- DE Chiddi Obiazor
- DT Mario Landino
- DT Tyrique Tucker
- DE Tobi Osunsanmi
- LB Rolijah Hardy
- LB Isaiah Jones
- CB Jamari Sharpe
- CB Jaylen Bell
- S Amare Ferrell
- S Preston Zachman
- Rover Byron Baldwin

Josh Hoover earned 94 yards on 6/14 passing, while Grant Wilson threw 3/4 with 89 yards and a touchdown, Jacob Bell threw 4/7 for 49 yards, and Tyler Cherry threw 5/6 for 35 yards.

=== Big Ten media days ===
Carter Smith, Tyrique Tucker, and Isaiah Jones represented the Hoosiers at the 2026 Big Ten Media Days on July 30 in Chicago, Illinois.

== Schedule ==
Date	Time	Opponent	Rank	Site	TV	Result	Attendance
September 5	12:00 p.m.	North Texas*	No. 6	Memorial Stadium; Bloomington, IN (Big Noon Kickoff)	FOX	W 52–16	54,493
September 12	12:00 p.m.	Howard*	No. 5	Memorial Stadium; Bloomington, IN	BTN	W 55–0	54,376
September 19	4:00 p.m.	Western Kentucky*	No. 4	Memorial Stadium; Bloomington, IN	Peacock	W 38–0	54,695
September 25	8:00 p.m.	Northwestern	No. 5	Memorial Stadium; Bloomington, IN	FOX	W 29–23	54,593
October 3	8:00 p.m.	at Rutgers	No. 6	SHI Stadium; Piscataway, NJ	BTN	W 47–15	48,650
October 10	12:00 p.m.	at Nebraska	No. 7	Memorial Stadium; Lincoln, NE (Big Noon Kickoff)	FOX	W 20–17	85,653
October 17	12:00 p.m.	No. 4 Ohio State	No. 5	Memorial Stadium; Bloomington, IN (Big Noon Kickoff)	FOX	L 15–19	54,532
October 24	12:00 p.m.	at Michigan	No. 6	Michigan Stadium; Ann Arbor, MI (Big Noon Kickoff)	FOX	W 13–6 ^{OT}	111,276
October 31	3:30 p.m.	Minnesota^{†}	No. 4	Memorial Stadium; Bloomington, IN (College GameDay)	CBS	W 23–16 ^{OT}	54,400
November 14	3:30 p.m.	No. 18 USC	No. 9	Memorial Stadium; Bloomington, IN	CBS	W 27–13	54,336
November 21	3:30 p.m.	at Washington	No. 8	Husky Stadium; Seattle, WA	Peacock/NBCSN	L 24–27	64,614
November 28	7:00 p.m.	Purdue		Memorial Stadium; Bloomington, IN (Old Oaken Bucket)	FS1		
*Non-conference game; ^{†}Homecoming; Rankings from AP Poll (and CFP Rankings, after November 4) - Released prior to game; All times are in Eastern time; Source:

== Rankings ==
Ranking movements Legend: ██ Increase in ranking ██ Decrease in ranking ( ) = First-place votes
	Week															
Poll	Pre	1	2	3	4	5	6	7	8	9	10	11	12	13	14	Final
AP	6 (8)	5 (8)	4 (3)	5 (4)	6 (1)	7 (1)	5 (1)	6	4	6	6	6	12			
Coaches	6 (14)	5 (11)	4 (10)	4 (9)	5 (8)	5 (8)	4 (9)	6	4	3	5 (2)	5 (3)	12			
CFP	Not released									4	9	8				Not released

== Game summaries ==
=== vs. North Texas ===
North Texas Mean Green (0–0) at No. 6 Indiana Hoosiers (0–0) – Game summary

Quarter	1	2	3	4	Total
Mean Green	0	6	10	0	16
No. 6 Hoosiers	14	10	7	21	52

at Memorial Stadium • Bloomington, Indiana

- Date: September 5
- Game time: 12:00 p.m
- Game weather: Sunny • Temperature: 91 °F (33 °C) • Wind: SE at 7 miles per hour (11 km/h)
- Game attendance: 54,493
- Referee: Chris Coyte
- TV announcers (Fox): Gus Johnson (play-by-play), Joel Klatt (analyst), and Jenny Taft (sideline reporter)

Game information

First quarter

- IU – Nick Marsh 15-yard pass from Josh Hoover (Nico Radicic kick), 13:36. Hoosiers 7–0. Drive: 3 plays, 20 yards, 1:13.
- IU – Turbo Richard 2-yard run (Nico Radicic kick), 0:13. Hoosiers 14–0. Drive: 10 plays, 61 yards, 5:39.

Second quarter

- UNT – Dominic De Freitas 47-yard field goal, 9:48. Hoosiers 14–3. Drive: 9 plays, 41 yards, 5:25.
- IU – Charlie Becker 9-yard pass from Josh Hoover (Nico Radicic kick), 6:46. Hoosiers 21–3. Drive: 5 plays, 51 yards, 2:53.
- UNT – Dominic De Freitas 33-yard field goal, 1:57. Hoosiers 21–6. Drive: 9 plays, 60 yards, 4:49.
- IU – Nico Radicic 49-yard field goal, 1:24. Hoosiers 24–6. Drive: 5 plays, 26 yards, 0:30.

Third quarter

- UNT – Jahiem White 9-yard run (Dominic De Freitas kick), 11:40. Hoosiers 24–13. Drive: 6 plays, 75 yards, 3:20.
- IU – Charlie Becker 35-yard pass from Josh Hoover (Nico Radicic kick), 9:56. Hoosiers 31–13. Drive: 4 plays, 35 yards, 1:42.
- UNT – Dominic De Freitas 38-yard field goal, 1:18. Hoosiers 31–16. Drive: 8 plays, 38 yards, 4:02.

Fourth quarter

- IU – Davion Chandler 42-yard pass from Josh Hoover (Nico Radicic kick), 12:51. Hoosiers 38–16. Drive: 7 plays, 77 yards, 3:19.
- IU – Turbo Richard 1-yard run (Nico Radicic kick), 5:26. Hoosiers 45–16. Drive: 9 plays, 30 yards, 5:36.
- IU – Grant Wilson 43-yard run (Nico Radicic kick), 1:47. Hoosiers 52–16. Drive: 1 play, 43 yards, 0:08.

Statistics	UNT	IU
First downs	19	18
Plays–yards	67–367	46–365
Rushes–yards	38–152	30–134
Passing yards	215	231
Passing: Comp–Att–Int	23–29-1	13–16-0
Turnovers	1	0
Time of possession	37:22	22:38

Team	Category	Player	Statistics
North Texas	Passing	Tayven Jackson	22/28, 192 yards, INT
North Texas	Rushing	Jahiem White	14 carries, 61 yards, TD
North Texas	Receiving	Corri Milliner	4 receptions, 66 yards
Indiana	Passing	Josh Hoover	13/16, 231 yards, 4 TD
Indiana	Rushing	Turbo Richard	15 carries, 58 yards, 2 TD
Indiana	Receiving	Charlie Becker	4 receptions, 64 yards, 2 TD

=== vs. Howard (FCS) ===
Howard Bison (FCS) (1–1) at No. 5 Indiana Hoosiers (1–0) – Game summary

Quarter	1	2	3	4	Total
Bison (FCS)	0	0	0	0	0
No. 5 Hoosiers	20	21	14	0	55

at Memorial Stadium • Bloomington, Indiana

- Date: September 12
- Game time: 12:00 p.m.
- Game weather: Cloudy • Temperature: 75 °F (24 °C) • Wind: S at 5 miles per hour (8.0 km/h)
- Game attendance: 54,376
- Referee: Jeremy Valentine
- TV announcers (BTN): Jeff Levering (play-by-play), Jake Butt (analyst), and Brooke Fletcher (sideline reporter)

Game information

First quarter

- IU - Charlie Becker 34-yard pass from Josh Hoover (Paddy McAteer kick), 12:56. Hoosiers 7-0 Drive: 5 plays, 56 yards, 1:55.
- IU - Charlie Becker 6-yard pass from Josh Hoover, 4:16. Hoosiers 13-0 Drive:10 plays, 86 yards, 4:54.
- IU - Shazz Preston 39-yard pass from Josh Hoover (Paddy McAteer kick), 1:34. Hoosiers 20-0 Drive: 4 plays, 70 yards, 1:51.

Second quarter

- Charlie Becker 41-yard pass from Josh Hoover (Paddy McAteer kick), 6:07. Hoosiers 27-0 Drive: 8 plays, 70 yards, 4:36.
- Rolijah Hardy 19-yard interception return (Paddy McAteer kick), 4:39. Hoosiers 34-0
- Turbo Richard 14-yard run (Paddy McAteer kick), 1:30. Hoosiers 41-0 Drive: 8 plays, 48 yards, 1:20.

Third quarter

- Davion Chandler 3-yard pass from Grant Wilson (Paddy McAteer kick), 7:53. Hoosiers 48-0 Drive: 9 plays, 68 yards, 5:14.
- Nick Marsh 51-yard pass from Grant Wilson (Paddy McAteer kick), 6:03. Hoosiers 55-0 Drive: 1 play, 51 yards, 0:06

Fourth quarter

- No scoring plays.

Statistics	HOW	IU
First downs	4	24
Total yards	57	505
Rushes–yards	27–13	46–296
Passing yards	44	209
Passing: Comp–Att–Int	10–20–1	9–16–0
Turnovers	1	1
Time of possession	26:24	33:36

Team	Category	Player	Statistics
Howard	Passing	Ja'Shawn Scroggins	8/15, 43 yards, INT
Howard	Rushing	Billy Roberson II	7 carries, 14 yards
Howard	Receiving	Derrick Miller	1 reception, 15 yards
Indiana	Passing	Josh Hoover	6/11, 145 yards, 4 TD
Indiana	Rushing	Lee Beebe Jr.	16 carries, 112 yards
Indiana	Receiving	Charlie Becker	3 receptions, 81 yards, 3 TD

=== vs. Western Kentucky ===
Western Kentucky Hilltoppers (0–2) at No. 4 Indiana Hoosiers (2–0) – Game summary

Quarter	1	2	3	4	Total
Hilltoppers	0	0	0	0	0
No. 4 Hoosiers	0	14	17	7	38

at Memorial Stadium • Bloomington, Indiana

- Date: September 19
- Game time: 4:00 p.m.
- Game weather: Sunny
- Game attendance: 54,695
- Referee: David Siegle
- TV announcers (Peacock): Dan Hicks (play-by-play), Yogi Roth (analyst), and Caroline Pineda (sideline reporter)

Game information

First quarter

No scoring plays

Second quarter

- IU - Davion Chandler 26-yard pass from Josh Hoover (Paddy McAteer kick), 9:51. Hoosiers 7-0. Drive: 12 plays, 98 yards, 6:19.
- IU - Lee Beebe Jr. 1-yard run (Paddy McAteer kick), 0:37. Hoosiers 14-0. Drive: 2 plays, 3 yards, 0:30.

Third quarter

- IU - Paddy McAteer 21-yard field goal, 11:43. Hoosiers 17-0. Drive: 7 plays, 58 yards, 3:13
- IU - Charlie Becker 79-yard pass from Josh Hoover (Paddy McAteer kick), 10:43. Hoosiers 24-0 Drive: 1 play, 79 yards, 0:12.
- IU - Lee Beebe Jr. 2-yard run (Paddy McAteer kick), 1:38. Hoosiers 31-0 Drive: 6 plays, 50 yards, 3:07

Fourth quarter

- IU - Turbo Richard 25-yard run (Paddy McAteer kick), 7:10. Hoosiers 38-0 Drive: 7 plays, 80 yards, 3:56

Statistics	WKU	IU
First downs	10	24
Total yards	186	513
Rushes–yards	29–66	41–233
Passing yards	120	280
Passing: Comp–Att–Int	17–31–1	19–25–0
Time of possession	25:09	34:51

Team	Category	Player	Statistics
Western Kentucky	Passing	Brock Glenn	17/32, 120 yards, INT
Western Kentucky	Rushing	Brock Glenn	11 carries, 30 yards
Western Kentucky	Receiving	CC Ezirim	2 receptions, 30 yards
Indiana	Passing	Josh Hoover	18/24, 273 yards, 2 TD
Indiana	Rushing	Turbo Richard	15 carries, 149 yards, TD
Indiana	Receiving	Charlie Becker	5 receptions, 127 yards, TD

=== vs. Northwestern ===
Northwestern Wildcats (2–0) at No. 5 Indiana Hoosiers (3–0) – Game summary

Quarter	1	2	3	4	Total
Wildcats	0	0	7	16	23
No. 5 Hoosiers	2	10	3	14	29

at Memorial Stadium • Bloomington, Indiana

- Date: September 25
- Game time: 8:00 p.m.
- Game weather: Cloudy • Temperature: 67 °F (19 °C) • Wind: NE at 5 miles per hour (8.0 km/h)
- Game attendance: 54,593
- Referee: Jason Nickleby
- TV announcers (FOX): Connor Onion (play-by-play), Robert Griffin III (analyst), and Alexa Landestoy (sideline reporter)

Game information
First quarter
- IU – Aidan Chiles tackled in own end zone by Daniel Ndukwe, 7:20. Hoosiers 2–0.

Second quarter

- IU – Nico Radicic 43-yard field goal, 13:06. Hoosiers 5–0. Drive: 9 plays, 51 yards, 4:42.
- IU – Nick Marsh 8-yard pass from Josh Hoover (Nico Radicic kick), 5:04. Hoosiers 12–0. Drive: 7 plays, 90 yards, 3:59.

Third quarter

- NU – Griffin Wilde 4-yard pass from Aidan Chiles (Jackson Kleather kick), 6:34. Hoosiers 12–7. Drive: 10 plays, 75 yards, 4:55.
- IU – Nico Radicic 22-yard field goal, 2:06. Hoosiers 15–7. Drive: 10 plays, 90 yards, 4:28.

Fourth quarter

- NU – Griffin Wilde 8-yard pass from Aidan Chiles (run failed), 14:54. Hoosiers 15–13. Drive: 6 plays, 75 yards, 2:12.
- IU – Lee Beebe 4-yard run (Nico Radicic kick), 9:39. Hoosiers 22–13. Drive: 10 plays, 75 yards, 5:15.
- NU – Aidan Chiles 7-yard run (Jackson Kleather kick), 5:10. Hoosiers 22–20. Drive: 9 plays, 78 yards, 4:25.
- IU – Josh Hoover 1-yard run (Nico Radicic kick), 1:56. Hoosiers 29–20. Drive: 6 plays, 75 yards, 3:14.
- NU – Jackson Kleather 42-yard field goal, 0:58. Hoosiers 29–23. Drive: 8 plays, 51 yards, 0:58.

Statistics	NU	IU
First downs	21	24
Total yards	325	472
Rushes–yards	27–32	40–271
Passing yards	293	201
Passing: Comp–Att–Int	22–30–0	19–29–0
Turnovers	0	0
Time of possession	25:13	34:47

Team	Category	Player	Statistics
Northwestern	Passing	Aidan Chiles	22/29, 293 yards, 2 TD
Northwestern	Rushing	Gavin Sawchuk	5 carries, 26 yards
Northwestern	Receiving	Luke Dehnicke	7 receptions, 140 yards
Indiana	Passing	Josh Hoover	19/29, 201 yards, TD
Indiana	Rushing	Lee Beebe Jr.	24 carries, 203 yards, TD
Indiana	Receiving	Charlie Becker	7 receptions, 98 yards

=== at Rutgers ===
No. 6 Indiana Hoosiers (4–0) at Rutgers Scarlet Knights (1–3) – Game summary

Quarter	1	2	3	4	Total
No. 6 Hoosiers	10	13	14	10	47
Scarlet Knights	0	0	7	8	15

at SHI Stadium • Piscataway, New Jersey

- Date: October 3
- Game time: 8:00 p.m.
- Game weather: Clear • Temperature: 63 °F (17 °C) • Wind: E at 5 miles per hour (8.0 km/h)
- Game attendance: 48,650
- Referee: Time O'Dey
- TV announcers (BTN): Mark Followill (play-by-play), Rhett Lewis (analyst), and Caroline Hendershot (sideline reporter)

Statistics	IU	RUTG
First downs	26	9
Total yards	593	254
Rushes–yards	39–329	35–59
Passing yards	264	195
Passing: Comp–Att–Int	21–29–0	11–20–0
Turnovers	0	0
Time of possession	33:02	26:58

Team	Category	Player	Statistics
Indiana	Passing	Josh Hoover	20-27, 251 yards, 4 TDs
Indiana	Rushing	Turbo Richard; Lee Beebe Jr.	13 carries, 204 yards, TD; 18 carries, 122 yards, TD
Indiana	Receiving	Charlie Becker; Nick Marsh	8 receptions, 107 yards, 2 TDs; 7 receptions, 120 yards, TD
Rutgers	Passing	A.J. Surace; Dylan Lonergan	6-10, 128 yards, TD; 5-10, 67 yards
Rutgers	Rushing	Clay Thevenin	12 carries, 47 yards, TD
Rutgers	Receiving	K.J. Duff Jr. Ben Black III	4 receptions, 78 yards 1 reception, 53 yards, TD

=== at Nebraska ===
No. 7 Indiana Hoosiers (5–0) at Nebraska Cornhuskers (5–0) – Game summary

Quarter	1	2	3	4	Total
No. 7 Hoosiers	3	0	3	14	20
Cornhuskers	10	0	0	7	17

at Memorial Stadium • Lincoln, Nebraska

- Date: October 10
- Game time: 12:00 p.m.
- Game weather: Sunny • Temperature: 79 °F (26 °C) • Wind: 16 miles per hour (26 km/h)
- Game attendance: 85,653
- Referee: Kole Knueppel
- TV announcers (FOX): Gus Johnson (play-by-play), Joel Klatt (analyst), and Jenny Taft (sideline reporter)

Game information

First Quarter

- (8:57) NEB – Kyle Cunanan 28-yard field goal (Drive: 13 plays, 66 yards, 06:03, Nebraska 3–0)
- (6:21) IU – Nico Radicic 42-yard field goal (Drive: 6 plays, 51 yards, 2:36, 3-3)
- (1:01) NEB - Nyziah Hunter 10-yard rush (Kyle Cunanan kick) (Drive: 10 plays, 75 yards, 5:20, Nebraska 10-3)

Second Quarter

- (No Scoring)

Third Quarter

- (10:26) IND - Nico Radicic 35-yard field goal (Drive: 10 plays, 58 yards, 4:34, Nebraska 10-6)

Fourth Quarter

- (12:01) NEB – Anthony Colandrea 39-yard rush (Kyle Cunanan kick) (Drive: 5 plays, 71 yards, 2:11, Nebraska 17-6)
- (11:51) IU - Nick Marsh 75-yard pass from Josh Hoover (Nico Radicic kick) (Drive: 1 plays, 75 yards, 0:10, Nebraska 17-13)
- (7:13) IU - Nick Marsh 44-yard pass from Josh Hoover (Nico Radicic kick) (Drive: 5 plays, 80 yards, 2:11, Indiana 20-17)

Statistics	IU	NEB
First downs	13	25
Total yards	328	390
Rushes–yards	22–65	39–128
Passing yards	263	262
Passing: Comp–Att–Int	12–22–0	23–39–1
Turnovers	0	1
Time of possession	20:27	39:28

Team	Category	Player	Statistics
Indiana	Passing	Josh Hoover	12/22, 263 yards, 2 TD
Indiana	Rushing	Lee Beebe Jr.	9 carries, 31 yards
Indiana	Receiving	Nick Marsh	6 receptions, 187 yards, 2 TD
Nebraska	Passing	Anthony Colandrea	23/41, 239 yards, 1 INT
Nebraska	Rushing	Jamal Rule	15 carries, 53 yards
Nebraska	Receiving	Jacory Barney Jr.	9 receptions, 123 yards

=== vs. Ohio State ===
No. 4 Ohio State Buckeyes (5–1) at No. 5 Indiana Hoosiers (6–0) – Game summary

Quarter	1	2	3	4	Total
No. 4 Buckeyes	3	7	3	6	19
No. 5 Hoosiers	0	7	0	8	15

at Memorial Stadium • Bloomington, Indiana

- Date: October 17
- Game time: 12:00 p.m.
- Game weather: Sunny; • Temperature: 51 °F (11 °C) • Wind: N at 8 miles per hour (13 km/h)
- Game attendance: 54,532
- Referee: Jeff Servinski
- TV announcers (FOX): Gus Johnson (play-by-play), Joel Klatt (analyst), Jenny Taft and Tom Rinaldi (sideline reporters)

Game information

First quarter
Second quarter
Third quarter
Fourth quarter

Statistics	OSU	IU
First downs	19	17
Total yards	313	369
Rushes–yards	37-78	29-73
Passing yards	235	296
Passing: Comp–Att–Int	15-31-2	20-40-0
Time of possession	32:12	27:48

Team	Category	Player	Statistics
Ohio State	Passing	Julian Sayin	15/29, 235 yards 2 TD, 2 INT
Ohio State	Rushing	Bo Jackson	18 carries, 56 yards
Ohio State	Receiving	Jeremiah Smith	4 receptions, 68 yards, 1 TD
Indiana	Passing	Josh Hoover	20/40, 296 yards, 1 TD
Indiana	Rushing	Turbo Richard	16 carries, 46 yards, 1 TD
Indiana	Receiving	Charlie Becker	9 receptions, 165 yards

=== at Michigan ===
No. 6 Indiana Hoosiers (6–1) at Michigan Wolverines (4–2) – Game summary

Quarter	1	2	3	4	OT	Total
No. 6 Hoosiers	3	3	0	0	7	13
Wolverines	0	0	3	3	0	6

at Michigan Stadium • Ann Arbor, Michigan

- Date: October 24
- Game time: 12:00 p.m.
- Game weather: 54 °F (12 °C), sunny, SE 5 miles per hour (8.0 km/h)
- Game attendance: 111,276
- Referee: Mark Klucznski
- TV announcers (FOX): Gus Johnson (play-by-play), Joel Klatt (analyst), and Jenny Taft (sideline reporter)

Game information

First quarter

- (3:44) IU ― Nico Radicic 24-yard field goal (Drive: 7 plays, 24 yards, 2:48; Indiana 3–0)

Second quarter

- (9:31) IU ― Nico Radicic 34-yard field goal (Drive: 4 plays, 5 yards, 1:57; Indiana 6–0)

Third quarter

- (2:22) MICH ― Trey Butkowski 29-yard field goal (Drive: 4 plays, 2 yards, 1:26; Indiana 6–3)

Fourth quarter

- (0:00) MICH ― Trey Butkowski 26-yard field goal (Drive: 13 plays, 53 yards, 7:32; Tied 6–6)

Overtime

- (0:00) IU ― Josh Hoover 4-yard run, Nico Radicic kick (Drive: 2 plays, 25 yards, 0:00; Indiana 13–6)

Statistics	IU	MICH
First downs	11	16
Plays–yards	53–212	74–224
Rushes–yards	35–131	42–57
Passing yards	81	167
Passing: comp–att–int	8–18–1	20–32–1
Time of possession	26:16	33:44

Team	Category	Player	Statistics
Indiana	Passing	Josh Hoover	8/18, 81 yards, INT
Indiana	Rushing	Turbo Richard	19 carries, 68 yards
Indiana	Receiving	Charlie Becker	3 receptions, 32 yards
Michigan	Passing	Tommy Carr	20/32, 167 yards, INT
Michigan	Rushing	Jordan Marshall	12 carries, 26 yards
Michigan	Receiving	JJ Buchanan	6 receptions, 57 yards

=== vs. Minnesota ===
Minnesota Golden Gophers (5–2) at No. 4 Indiana Hoosiers (7–1) – Game summary

Quarter	1	2	3	4	OT	Total
Golden Gophers	3	7	0	6	0	16
No. 4 Hoosiers	7	0	3	6	7	23

at Memorial Stadium • Bloomington, Indiana

- Date: October 31
- Game attendance: 54,400
- TV announcers (CBS): Brad Nessler (play-by-play), Charles Davis (analyst), and Jenny Dell (sideline reporter)

Game information

First quarter
Second quarter
Third quarter
Fourth quarter

Statistics	MINN	IU
First downs	10	21
Total yards	215	419
Rushes–yards	95	144
Passing yards	120	275
Passing: Comp–Att–Int	20-37-0	17-36-1
Time of possession	28:27	38:33

Team	Category	Player	Statistics
Minnesota	Passing	Drake Lindsey	20/37, 120 yards, 1 TD
Minnesota	Rushing	TJ Thomas	6 carries, 54 yards
Minnesota	Receiving	Javon Tracy	7 receptions, 40 yards
Indiana	Passing	Grant Wilson	9/17, 156 yards, 1 TD
Indiana	Rushing	Lee Beebe Jr.	15 carries, 84 yards
Indiana	Receiving	Charlie Becker	8 receptions, 149 yards, 1 TD

=== vs. No. 18 USC ===
No. 18 USC Trojans (7–2) at No. 9 Indiana Hoosiers (8–1) – Game summary

Quarter	1	2	3	4	Total
No. 18 Trojans	3	7	3	0	13
No. 9 Hoosiers	7	3	10	7	27

at Memorial Stadium • Bloomington, Indiana

- Date: November 14
- Game time: 3:30 p.m.
- Game weather: Sunny
- Game attendance: 54,336
- Referee: Scott Aronowitz
- TV announcers (CBS): Brad Nessler (play-by-play), Charles Davis (analyst), and Jenny Dell (sideline reporter)

Game information

First quarter
Second quarter
Third quarter
Fourth quarter

Statistics	USC	IU
First downs	21	18
Total yards	409	451
Rushes–yards	25–98	35–146
Passing yards	311	305
Passing: Comp–Att–Int	26–42–3	17–27–1
Time of possession	30:12	29:48

Team	Category	Player	Statistics
USC	Passing	Jayden Maiava	26/42, 311 yards, 1 TD, 3 INT
USC	Rushing	Waymond Jordan	13 carries, 55 yards
USC	Receiving	Trent Mosley	9 receptions, 130 yards
Indiana	Passing	Grant Wilson	17/27, 305 yards, 2 TD, 1 INT
Indiana	Rushing	Khobie Martin	12 carries, 83 yards, 1 TD
Indiana	Receiving	Nick Marsh	4 receptions, 80 yards

=== at Washington ===
No. 8 Indiana Hoosiers (9–1) at Washington Huskies (6–4) – Game summary

Quarter	1	2	3	4	OT	Total
No. 8 Hoosiers	14	0	3	7	0	24
Huskies	14	0	0	10	3	27

at Husky Stadium • Seattle, Washington

- Date: November 21
- TV announcers (NBCSN/Peacock): Paul Burmeister (play-by-play), Yogi Roth (analyst), and Caroline Pineda (sideline reporter)

Statistics	IU	WASH
First downs		
Plays–yards		
Rushes–yards		
Passing yards		
Passing: comp–att–int		
Time of possession		

Team	Category	Player	Statistics
Indiana	Passing		
Indiana	Rushing		
Indiana	Receiving		
Washington	Passing		
Washington	Rushing		
Washington	Receiving		

=== vs. Purdue ===
Purdue Boilermakers (0–0) at Indiana Hoosiers (0–0) – Game summary

Quarter	1	2	3	4	Total
Boilermakers	0	0	0	0	0
Hoosiers	0	0	0	0	0

at Memorial Stadium • Bloomington, Indiana

- Date: November 28

Game information

First quarter
Second quarter
Third quarter
Fourth quarter

Statistics	PUR	IU
First downs		
Total yards		
Rushes–yards		
Passing yards		
Passing: Comp–Att–Int		
Time of possession		

Team	Category	Player	Statistics
Purdue	Passing		
Purdue	Rushing		
Purdue	Receiving		
Indiana	Passing		
Indiana	Rushing		
Indiana	Receiving		

== Personnel ==
=== Roster ===
2026 Indiana Hoosiers football team roster
Players
Coaches
Offense

Pos.	#	Name	Class
RB	1	Turbo Richard	Jr
QB	2	Grant Wilson	GS
WR	3	Kortez Rupert	Fr
WR	4	Davion Chandler	Fr
WR	6	LeBron Bond	So
WR	7	Shazz Preston	Sr
WR	8	Tyler Morris	Sr
WR	9	Lavar Keys	Fr
QB	10	Josh Hoover	Sr
WR	11	Nick Marsh	Jr
QB	12	Jacob Bell	Fr
QB	14	Maverick Geske	Fr
QB	15	Tyler Cherry	Fr
WR	17	Jackson Wasserstrom	Sr
TE	18	Parker Elmore	Fr
RB	20	Sean Cuono	Fr
RB	22	Jayreon Campbell	Fr
WR	26	Cade Kaiser	Fr
RB	28	Khobie Martin	So
RB	29	Lee Beebe Jr.	Sr
TE	39	Trevor Gibbs	Fr
OL	51	Kyler Garcia	So
OL	56	Joe Brunner	Sr
OL	60	C. J. Scifres	Fr
OL	61	Baylor Wilkin	Fr
OL	62	Drew Evans	Sr
OL	64	Chance Johnson	Fr
OL	65	Carter Smith	Sr
OL	66	Evan Parker	Fr
OL	70	Austin Leibfried	So
OL	71	Ben Novak	Fr
OL	72	Adedamola Ajani	So
OL	73	Luke Graham	Fr
OL	74	Bray Lynch	Sr
OL	75	Sam Simpson	Fr
OL	76	Kenton Mondeau	Fr
OL	77	Matt Marek	Fr
OL	78	Prescott Horvath	Fr
WR	80	Charlie Becker	Jr
WR	81	Jaidon Van Pelt	Fr
WR	82	Myles Kendrick	Fr
WR	83	Hunter Stroud	Fr
TE	84	Blake Thiry	Fr
TE	85	Andrew Barker	Fr
WR	86	Bruno Massel IV	Fr
TE	87	P. J. MacFarlane	Fr
TE	88	Brock Schott	Fr

Defense

Pos.	#	Name	Class
DB	0	Carson Williams	So
DB	1	Amare Ferrell	Sr
DB	2	Byron Baldwin	So
DB	3	Jaylen Bell	So
DB	4	A. J. Harris	Sr
LB	5	Rolijah Hardy	Jr
DB	6	Preston Zachman	Sr
DL	7	Chiddi Obiazor	Jr
DL	8	Joshua Burnham	Sr
DL	9	Stephen Daley	Sr
DB	10	Ryland Gandy	Sr
DL	12	Tobi Osunsanmi	Sr
DB	13	Jiquan Sanks	Jr
LB	14	Kaiden Turner	Sr
DB	16	Jamar Owens	Fr
DL	17	Daniel Ndukwe	Jr
DL	18	Kellan Wyatt	GS
DB	19	Zacharey Smith	Fr
DB	20	Seaonta Stewart Jr.	Fr
LB	21	Jacob Savage	Fr
DB	22	Jamari Sharpe	Sr
LB	23	Henry Ohlinger	Fr
LB	24	Ja'Dyn Williams	Fr
DB	25	D'Montae Tims	Fr
DB	26	Iosua Stephens	So
DB	27	Kasmir Hicks	Fr
LB	30	P. J. Nelson	Fr
DB	31	Anthony Chung	Jr
DB	33	Garrett Reese	So
LB	34	Jeff Utzinger	Sr
DB	36	Clay Conner	Jr
DB	37	Heath Kizer	So
LB	38	Kaden McConnell	So
DL	40	Quentin Clark	So
DL	41	Keishaun Calhoun	Fr
DL	42	Kevontay Hugan	Fr
LB	44	Amari Kamara	Fr
DB	45	Lincoln Murff	Jr
LB	46	Isaiah Jones	Sr
DL	50	Jhrevious Hall	Fr
LB	52	Clayton Allen	Jr
DL	55	Rodney White	Fr
DL	90	Joe Hjelle	Sr
DL	91	Blake Smythe	Fr
DL	92	Gabe Hill	Fr
DL	93	Ronelle Johnson	Fr
DL	95	Tyrique Tucker	Sr
DL	97	Mario Landino	Jr
DL	98	Cam McHaney	Fr
DL	99	Tyrone Burrus Jr.	Fr

Special teams

Pos.	#	Name	Class
K	15	Nico Radicic	Jr
P	19	Billy Gowers	So
K	35	Paddy McAteer	Sr
K	43	Bryce Taylor	Fr
LS	47	Jackson Tolle	Fr
LS	55	Drew Clausen	GS
LS	57	Sam Lindsey	Jr
K	90	Josh Placzek	So
K	93	Quinn Warren	Jr

Head coach

- Curt Cignetti

Coordinators/assistant coaches

- Bryant Haines (Defensive coordinator/linebackers)
- Mike Shanahan (Offensive coordinator/wide receivers)
- Grant Cain (Special teams coordinator/tight ends)
- Ola Adams (Defensive backs/safeties)
- Bob Bostad (Run game coordinator/offensive line)
- Pat Kuntz (Defensive tackles)
- John Miller (Running backs)
- Rod Ojong (Cornerbacks)
- Tino Sunseri (Co-offensive coordinator/quarterbacks)
- Buddha Williams (Defensive ends)
- Tyson Brown (Director of football performance)

Legend

- (C) Team captain
- (S) Suspended
- (I) Ineligible
- Injured
- Redshirt

Roster
Last update: 11/09/2026

=== Depth chart ===
Defense

NB
2 Byron Baldwin
31 Anthony Chung
⋅

FS
6 Preston Zachman
16 Jamar Owens
⋅

WLB	MLB
5 Rolijah Hardy	46 Isaiah Jones
34 Jeff Utzinger	14 Kaiden Turner
⋅	⋅

SS
1 Amare Ferrell
13 Jiquan Sanks
⋅

CB
22 Jamari Sharpe
3 Jaylen Bell
⋅

DE	DT	DT	DE
12 Tobi Osunsanmi	97 Mario Landino	95 Tyrique Tucker	9 Stephen Daley
17 Daniel Ndukwe	98 Cam McHaney	90 Joe Hjelle	8 Joshua Burnham; 7 Chiddi Obiazor
⋅	⋅	⋅	⋅

CB
10 Ryland Gandy
45 Lincoln Murff
⋅

Offense

WR
11 Nick Marsh
7 Shazz Preston
⋅

WR
8 Tyler Morris
4 Davion Chandler
⋅

LT	LG	C	RG	RT
65 Carter Smith	62 Drew Evans	74 Bray Lynch	56 Joe Brunner	72 Adedamola Ajani
76 Kenton Mondeau	77 Matt Marek	70 Austin Leibfried	75 Sam Simpson	61 Baylor Wilkin
⋅	⋅	⋅	⋅	⋅

TE
85 Andrew Barker
39 Trevor Gibbs
88 Brock Schott

WR
80 Charlie Becker
17 Jackson Wasserstrom
⋅

QB
10 Josh Hoover
2 Grant Wilson
⋅

Key reserves

Special teams
PK 15 Nico Radicic
P 19 Billy Gowers
KR 1 Turbo Richard
PR 8 Tyler Morris
LS 55 Drew Clausen
H 44 Mitch McCarthy

RB
1 Turbo Richard
29 Lee Beebe Jr.
28 Khobie Martin
⋅

== Statistics ==
=== Individual leaders ===
==== Offense ====
Passing statistics
#	NAME	POS	CMP	ATT	PCT	YDS	AVG/G	TD	INT	LONG
10	Josh Hoover	QB	88	129	68.2	1,364	227.3	17	0	79
2	Grant Wilson	QB	4	5	80.0	74	18.5	2	0	51
15	Tyler Cherry	QB	1	3	33.3	10	10.0	0	0	10
	TOTALS		93	137	67.9	1,448	241.3	19	0	79
	OPPONENTS		108	175	61.7	1,131	173.4	3	4	53

Rushing statistics
#	NAME	POS	ATT	YDS	AVG	LNG	TD
1	Turbo Richard	RB	71	597	8.4	57	5
29	Lee Beebe Jr.	RB	98	551	5.6	70	4
22	Jayreon Campbell	RB	8	50	6.3	23	0
20	Sean Cuono	RB	13	46	33.5	9	0
2	Grant Wilson	QB	4	45	11.3	43	1
15	Josh Hoover	QB	22	42	1.9	16	0
	TOTALS		218	1,420	6.1	70	11
	OPPONENTS		195	450	2.3	39	5

Receiving statistics
#	NAME	POS	REC	YDS	AVG	LNG	TD
80	Charlie Becker	WR	30	529	17.8	79	8
11	Nick Marsh	WR	29	528	18.2	75	6
7	Shazz Preston	WR	9	123	13.7	39	1
4	Davion Chandler	WR	9	99	11.0	42	4
8	Tyler Morris	WR	6	56	9.3	22	0
1	Turbo Richard	RB	3	47	15.7	38	0
39	Trevor Gibbs	TE	2	21	10.5	13	0
29	Lee Beebe Jr.	RB	2	4	2.0	2	0
17	Jackson Wasserstrom	WR	1	10	10.0	10	0
85	Andrew Barker	TE	1	6	6.0	6	0
86	Brock Schott	TE	1	25	25.0	25	0
	TOTALS		93	1,448	15.6	79	19
	OPPONENTS		108	1,131	10.5	53	3

==== Defense ====
Defensive statistics
#	NAME	POS	SOLO	AST	CMB	TFL	SCK	INT	PD	FF	FR	TD
46	Isaiah Jones	LB	28	18	46	1–1	0–0	1	2	0	0	0
5	Rolijah Hardy	LB	25	16	41	3–3	0–0	1	1	0	0	1
6	Preston Zachman	DB	18	16	34	0–0	0–0	0	0	0	0	0
2	Byron Baldwin	DB	11	16	27	2.5–22	2–25	0	1	0	0	0
1	Amare Ferrell	DB	11	16	27	0.5–2	0–0	0	1	0	0	0
12	Tobi Osunsanmi	DL	13	9	22	9.5–40	5–31	0	0	1	0	0
9	Stephen Daley	DL	11	8	16	6–40	5–36	0	0	2	0	0
22	Jamari Sharpe	DB	9	7	16	1–7	0–0	1	3	0	0	0
95	Tyrique Tucker	DL	5	9	14	2.5–10	1–8	0	0	0	0	0
10	Ryland Gandy	DB	9	5	14	0–0	0–0	0	2	1	0	0
3	Jaylen Bell	DB	7	6	13	0–0	0–0	0	0	0	0	0
90	Joe Hjelle	DL	6	6	12	2.5–6	0–0	0	0	0	0	0
97	Mario Landino	DL	7	4	11	2.5–17	2–16	0	1	1	0	0
13	Jiquan Sanks	DB	5	5	10	0.5–1	0–0	1	0	0	0	0
21	Jacob Savage	LB	6	3	9	2.5–5	1–1	0	0	0	0	0
8	Joshua Burnham	DL	3	6	9	2.5–8	1–5	0	0	0	0	0
34	Jeff Utzinger	LB	7	2	9	0.5–0	0–0	0	1	0	0	0
17	Daniel Ndukwe	DB	4	2	6	4.5–12	0–0	0	0	0	0	0
7	Chiddi Obiazor	DL	1	4	5	1.5–4	0–0	0	0	0	0	0
14	Kaiden Turner	LB	3	2	5	0–0	0–0	0	0	0	0	0
91	Blake Smythe	DL	2	2	4	2–8	1–7	0	0	0	0	0
31	Anthony Chung	DB	0	4	4	0.5–0	0–0	0	0	0	0	0
18	Kellan Wyatt	DL	2	2	4	0–0	0–0	0	0	0	0	0
41	Keishaun Calhoun	DL	2	1	3	2.5–9	2–8	0	0	0	0	0
98	Cam McHaney	DL	0	3	3	1–0	0–0	0	0	0	0	0
45	Lincoln Murff	DB	1	1	2	0–0	0–0	0	0	0	0	0
0	Carson Williams	DB	1	0	1	0–0	0–0	0	0	0	0	0
16	Jamar Owens	DB	0	1	1	0–0	0–0	0	0	0	0	0
23	Henry Ohlinger	LB	1	0	1	0–0	0–0	0	0	0	0	0
4	AJ Harris	DB	1	0	1	0–0	0–0	0	0	0	0	0
	TOTALS		199	174	373	49–199	20–137	4	12	5	0	1
	OPPONENTS		189	188	377	24–94	9–52	0	12	2	1	0

==== Special teams ====
Kicking statistics
#	NAME	POS	XPM	XPA	XP%	FGM	FGA	FG%	LNG
15	Nico Radicic	K	15	16	93.8	7	8	87.5	49
35	Paddy McAteer	K	12	13	92.3	1	2	50.0	21
	TOTALS		29	31	94	6	8	80.0	49
	OPPONENTS		6	6	100	5	7	71.4	47

Punting statistics
#	NAME	POS	PUNTS	YDS	AVG	LNG	BLK	TB	I–20
19	Billy Gowers	P	16	601	37.6	48	0	0	7
	TOTALS		16	601	37.6	48	0	0	7
	OPPONENTS		32	1,424	44.5	72	1	2	10

Kick return statistics
#	NAME	POS	RET	YDS	AVG	LNG	TD
1	Turbo Richard	RB	5	130	26.0	41	0
29	Lee Beebe Jr.	RB	3	72	24.0	67	0
2	Joshua Burnham	DL	2	16	8.0	11	0
	TOTALS		10	218	21.8	67	0
	OPPONENTS		6	114	19.0	23	0

Punt return statistics
#	NAME	POS	RET	YDS	AVG	LNG	TD
8	Tyler Morris	WR	5	55	11.0	36	0
80	Charlie Becker	WR	1	17	17.0	17	0
	TOTALS		6	72	12.0	36	0
	OPPONENTS		2	13	6.5	11	0
