= Charlie Becker (American football) =

American football player

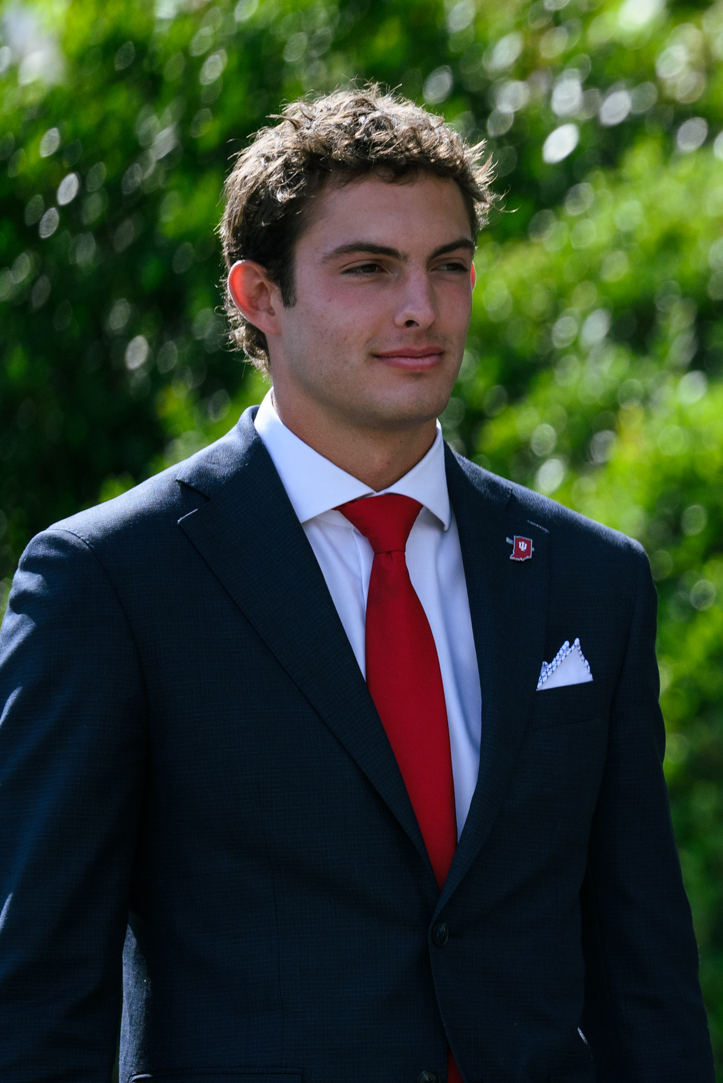
- Becker in 2026

No. 80 – Indiana Hoosiers
- Position: Wide receiver
- Class: Junior

Personal information
- Listed height: 6 ft 4 in (1.93 m)
- Listed weight: 208 lb (94 kg)

Career information
- High school: Father Ryan (Nashville, Tennessee)
- College: Indiana (2024–present)

Awards and highlights
- CFP national champion (2025)
- Stats at ESPN

Charlie Becker is an American college football wide receiver for the Indiana Hoosiers.

== Early life ==
Becker grew up in Cincinnati, Ohio, and moved to Nashville, Tennessee, with his family when he was in kindergarten. He attended Father Ryan High School in Nashville, where he competed in football and track and field. As a junior in 2022, he won state championships in the 110-meter hurdles and 300-meter hurdles. A three-star college football recruit per 247Sports, he committed to play for the Indiana Hoosiers.

== College career ==
As a freshman with the Indiana Hoosiers in 2024, Becker played in 12 games, primarily on special teams. He scored his first career touchdown on a three-yard rush against the Western Illinois Leathernecks.

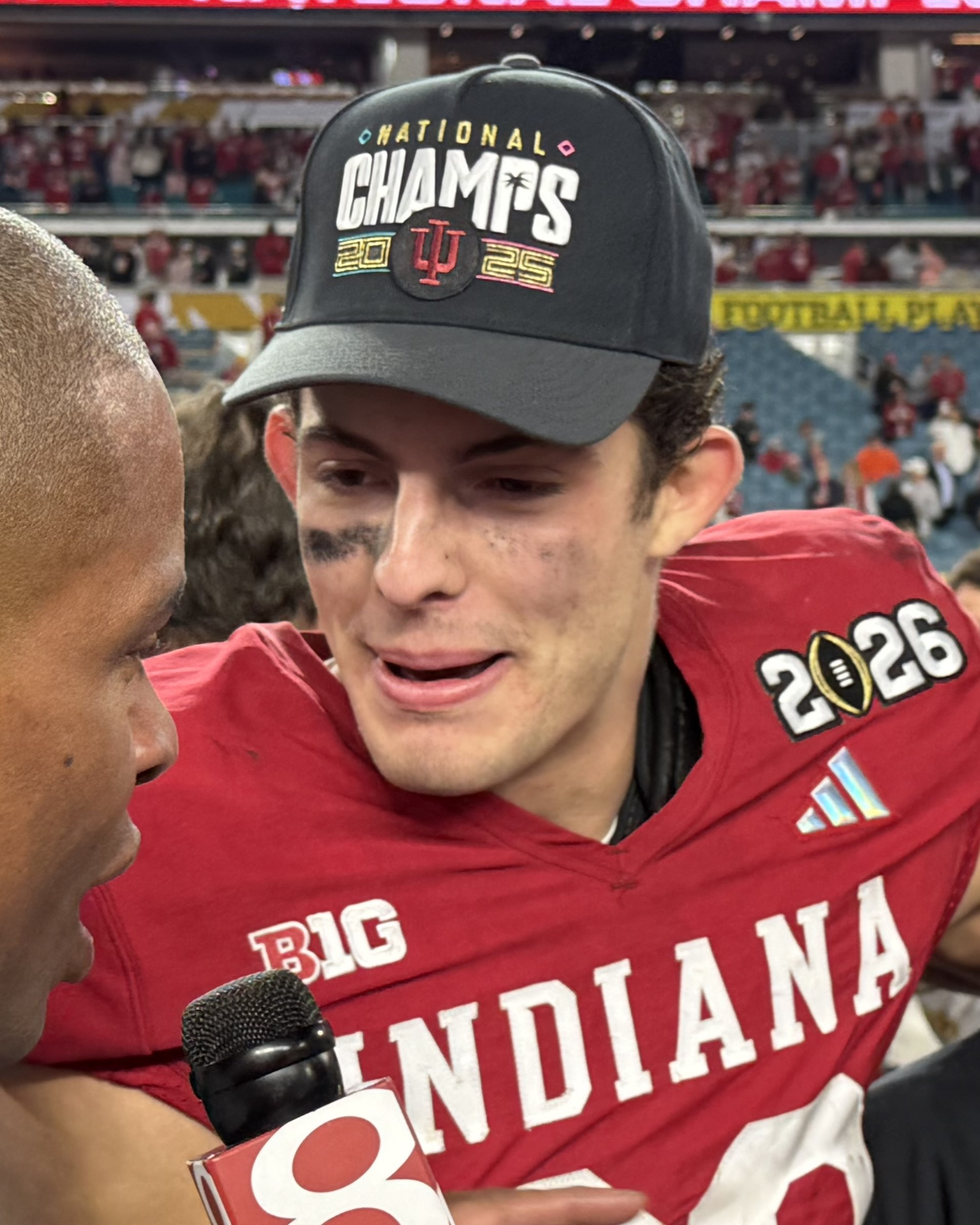
Becker after winning the 2026 College Football Playoff National Championship versus the Miami Hurricanes.

In 2025, he recorded his first receiving touchdown against the Kennesaw State Owls. Becker stepped into a more prominent role against the Penn State Nittany Lions with starting receiver Elijah Sarratt unable to play with a hamstring injury; he recorded seven receptions for 118 yards, including a crucial catch to set up Indiana's game-winning score. In the 2025 Big Ten Football Championship Game against the Ohio State Buckeyes, Becker caught a 51-yard pass from quarterback Fernando Mendoza, just the third play of at least 50 yards allowed by Ohio State during the season, to advance a drive that resulted in a touchdown catch by Indiana receiver Elijah Sarratt. Becker also caught a 33-yard pass late in the game that prevented Ohio State from regaining possession of the ball until only 18 seconds remained in the game, sealing a 13–10 Indiana victory and the program's first Big Ten Conference championship since 1967. Becker led all Indiana players with six receptions for 126 yards in the game. He caught a 21-yard pass for a touchdown in Indiana's 38–3 win over the Alabama Crimson Tide in the 2026 Rose Bowl. He also caught a 36-yard touchdown in a 56–22 win against the Oregon Ducks in the 2026 Peach Bowl. In the 2026 College Football Playoff National Championship, Becker recorded four catches for 65 receiving yards, including a 19-yard pass on 4th and 5 as well as another 19-yard catch on 3rd and 7 to extend scoring drives as Indiana defeated the Miami Hurricanes, 27–21, securing Indiana's first national championship. He ended the 2025 season totaling 34 catches for 679 yards and four touchdowns; his 20.0 yards per reception was the highest mark in the Big Ten.

Entering 2026, Becker was named a Second-Team Preseason All American by the Associated Press along with his teammate Tyrique Tucker.

== Personal life ==
Becker's brother, Cole, played college football as a linebacker for the Appalachian State Mountaineers. Their father, Dave, played college football for the Ohio State Buckeyes and also played professional baseball for the minor league organization of the Toronto Blue Jays. His younger sister, Gracyn, plays soccer at Miami University.

Becker's aunt was diagnosed with ALS. On an episode of The Pat McAfee Show, Becker said he would donate $1,000 for every touchdown he scored in the 2026 Indiana Hoosiers season to support ALS research; Pat McAfee said he would match the donations. Becker also partnered with a Bloomington, Indiana, restaurant to raise money for ALS research.
