= 2026 Rose Bowl =

Postseason college football bowl game

2026 Rose Bowl presented by Prudential
- College Football Playoff Quarterfinal; 112th Rose Bowl Game
Alabama Crimson Tide	Indiana Hoosiers
(11–3)	(13–0)
SEC	Big Ten
3	38
Head coach: Kalen DeBoer	Head coach: Curt Cignetti
AP / Coaches / CFP; 11 / 11 / 9	AP / Coaches / CFP; 1 / 1 / 1
	1	2	3	4	Total
Alabama	0	0	3	0	3
Indiana	0	17	7	14	38
- Date: January 1, 2026
- Season: 2025
- Stadium: Rose Bowl
- Location: Pasadena, California
- Players of the Game: Pat Coogan (Indiana, C); D'Angelo Ponds (Indiana, CB)
- Favorite: Indiana by 7.5
- Referee: Kevin Mar (Big 12)
- Halftime show: Million Dollar Band and Marching Hundred
- Attendance: 90,278

United States TV coverage
- Network: ESPN
- Announcers: Chris Fowler (play-by-play), Kirk Herbstreit (analyst), Holly Rowe and Kris Budden (sideline reporters)
- Nielsen ratings: 23.9 million viewers

The 2026 Rose Bowl is a college football bowl game that was played on January 1, 2026, at the Rose Bowl in Pasadena, California. The 112th annual Rose Bowl game was one of the College Football Playoff (CFP) quarterfinals and featured the Alabama Crimson Tide of the Southeastern Conference (SEC) and the Indiana Hoosiers of the Big Ten Conference. The game began at 1:00 p.m. PST. The Rose Bowl was one of the 2025–26 bowl games concluding the 2025 FBS football season and the winner advanced to the CFP semifinals. Sponsored by the Prudential financial services company, the game is officially known as the College Football Playoff Quarterfinal at the 2026 Rose Bowl Game presented by Prudential.

Indiana defeated Alabama by a 38–3 score, winning their first Rose Bowl in school history and first bowl game in 34 years. It was also their first major bowl game win in school history, as well as their first College Football Playoff game victory in school history.

The broadcasters are responsible for selecting the MVPs of the Rose Bowl. Color commentator Kirk Herbstreit of ESPN initially sought to give the Offensive MVP award to Indiana's entire offensive line but was told he could not. Herbstreit therefore chose to give the award to center Pat Coogan, who he considered to be representative of "kind of the anchor" of the unit.

The start of the game was one hour earlier than its traditional start time of 2 p.m. (local time), to avoid schedule conflict with the Sugar Bowl, in a change expected to carry forward to future editions. Magic Johnson, the Rose Parade grand marshal, attended the pre-game coin toss.

== Background ==
The 2026 Rose Bowl was a quarterfinal game for the 2025–26 College Football Playoff (CFP). Indiana, being one of the top four teams in the final CFP rankings, received a bye in the playoff format and was selected to play in a quarterfinal game, the Rose Bowl.

Alabama, the number 9 seed in the tournament, defeated Oklahoma, the number 8 seed, in the first round, 34–24, to advance to this game.

The winning team advanced to the CFP semifinals, to face the winner of the Orange Bowl in the Peach Bowl.

First round			Rose Bowl
			1	Indiana	38
9	Alabama	34	9	Alabama	3
8	Oklahoma	24

== Teams ==
This was the first-ever meeting between Alabama and Indiana.

=== Indiana Hoosiers ===
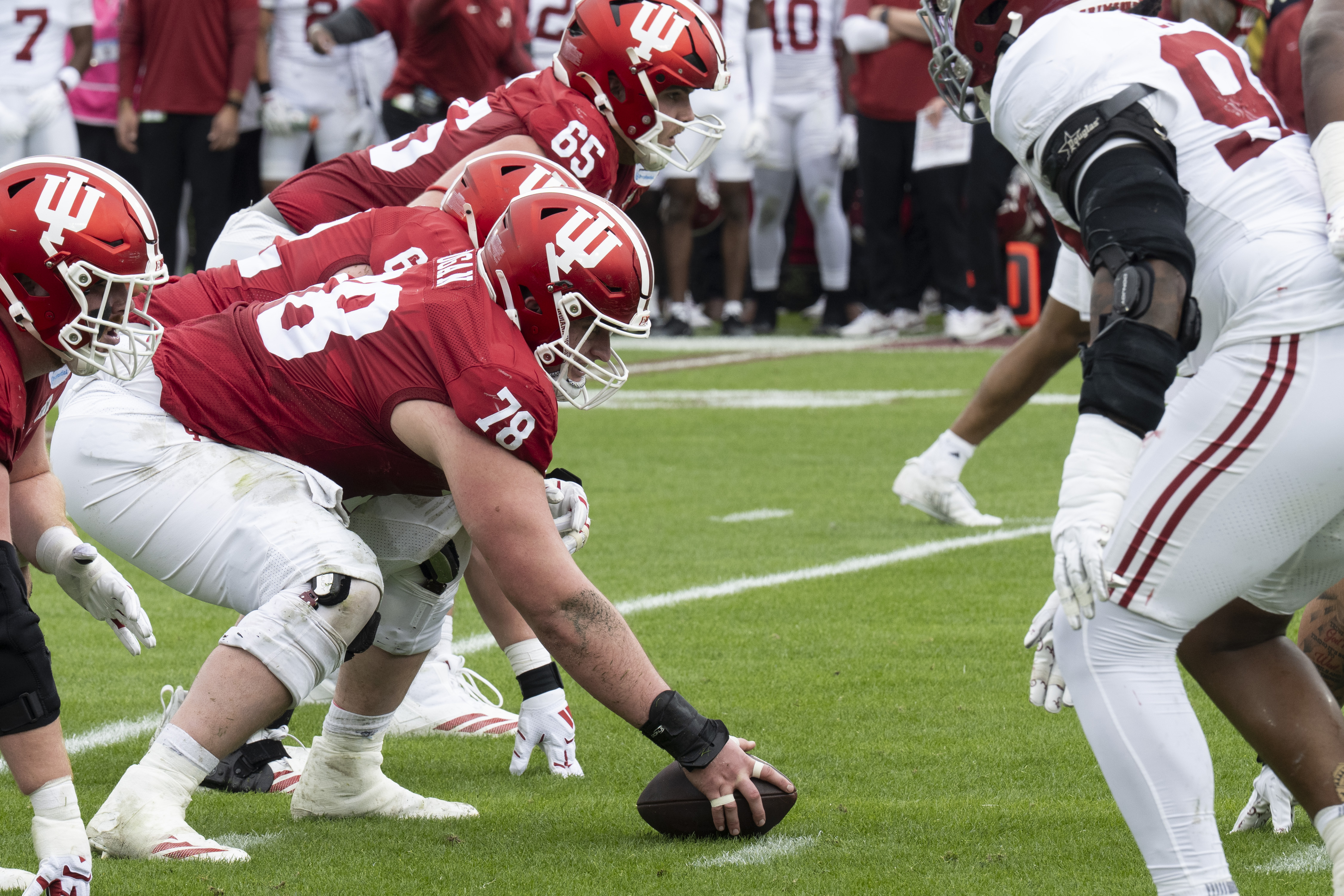
Offensive MVP Pat Coogan prepares to snap the ball for Indiana during the 2026 Rose Bowl

This was the second-ever appearance in the Rose Bowl for the Hoosiers, following the 1968 edition, which they lost to eventual national champion USC. Indiana entered the game as the Big Ten Conference champions with a 13–0 record (9–0 in conference), their first conference title since 1967.

=== Alabama Crimson Tide ===
This was the Crimson Tide's ninth Rose Bowl appearance, with a 5–2–1 record in prior games. Their last appearance came in the 2024 edition, an overtime loss to eventual national champion Michigan, which was Nick Saban’s final game as Alabama head coach. Alabama entered this game with an 11–3 record following its 34–24 first-round win over Oklahoma. This game marked the 100-year anniversary of Alabama's first trip to the Rose Bowl—in the 1926 edition, they defeated Washington, 20–19, to claim the school's first national championship.

== Weather ==
Weather was forecast to be an issue for the game, with the greater Pasadena area experiencing prolonged rainfall starting on Tuesday, December 30 through noontime on gameday. The morning Rose Parade experienced downpours. However, rain stopped by game time and careful field maintenance prevented traction issues during the game. Sunshine was visible by the end of the game, but clouds obscured the view of the traditional sunset.

To protect the field both marching bands performed both their pre-game and halftime routines from the stands. All other on-field pregame entertainment prior to the coin toss was cancelled. The traditional pregame flyover, featuring a B-2 bomber, was delayed to the start of the third quarter.

== Game summary ==
2026 Rose Bowl Game

Quarter	1	2	3	4	Total
(9) No. 9 Alabama	0	0	3	0	3
(1) No. 1 Indiana	0	17	7	14	38

at Rose Bowl • Pasadena, California

- Date: January 1, 2026
- Game time: 1:12 p.m. PST
- Game weather: Cloudy • Temperature: 60 °F (16 °C) • Wind: 3 mph (4.8 km/h) southwest
- Game attendance: 90,278
- Referee: Kevin Mar
- TV announcers (ESPN): Chris Fowler (play-by-play), Kirk Herbstreit (analyst), Holly Rowe and Kris Budden (sideline reporters)

Scoring summary

Quarter	Time	Drive			Team	Scoring information	Score	
Quarter	Time	Plays	Yards	TOP	Team	Scoring information	Alabama	Indiana
2	14:57	16	84	8:55	Indiana	31-yard field goal by Nico Radicic	0	3
2	10:49	4	34	1:47	Indiana	Charlie Becker 21-yard touchdown reception from Fernando Mendoza, Nico Radicic kick good	0	10
2	0:17	11	58	2:52	Indiana	Omar Cooper Jr. 1-yard touchdown reception from Fernando Mendoza, Nico Radicic kick good	0	17
3	7:46	10	79	5:40	Indiana	Elijah Sarratt 24-yard touchdown reception from Fernando Mendoza, Nico Radicic kick good	0	24
3	2:44	9	65	5:02	Alabama	28-yard field goal by Conor Talty	3	24
4	14:21	6	75	3:23	Indiana	Kaelon Black 25-yard touchdown run, Nico Radicic kick good	3	31
4	10:33	5	63	2:44	Indiana	Roman Hemby 18-yard touchdown run, Nico Radicic kick good	3	38
"TOP" = time of possession. For other American football terms, see Glossary of American football.							3	38

Alabama won the coin toss and elected to defer to the second half. Receiving the first half kickoff, Indiana went three-and-out on the first drive, with Alabama recording two sacks of Hoosier quarterback Fernando Mendoza. Alabama gained two first downs on its first drive but stalled at the Indiana 41-yard line and punted. The Hoosiers responded with a 16-play, 84-yard drive that occupied nearly nine minutes, but did not reach the end zone; Nico Radicic kicked a 31-yard field goal for a 3–0 lead on the first play of the second quarter.

The Crimson Tide gained nine yards on the first three plays of their subsequent drive to set up a 4th and 1 on their own 34-yard line. Initially, Alabama kept its offense on the field before Indiana called a timeout. Next, Alabama lined up in punt formation with the unusual feature of Ty Simpson, the Alabama quarterback, lining up as a personal protector, before quickly shifting the formation to move Simpson under center. Alabama appeared to use the sudden change in formation in an attempt to draw Indiana offsides, but was unsuccessful and called a timeout before the expiration of the play clock. After the second timeout, Alabama brought its offense back on the field and ran a sweep to the left side, but Indiana stopped Germie Bernard short of the line to gain and took over possession. Indiana was penalized 10 yards for holding on the drive's first play, but running back Roman Hemby gained 21 yards on 1st down and 20 for the first down. Three plays later, on 3rd down and 8, Mendoza found receiver Charlie Becker over the middle for a leaping 21-yard touchdown catch to stretch the Indiana lead to 10–0 with 10:49 remaining in the first half. After both teams traded punts, Alabama faced 3rd down and 7 from its own 49 yard line. Simpson scrambled to gain first down yardage but Indiana defensive back D'Angelo Ponds delivered a hit to Simpson's back side, forcing a fumble that Indiana recovered. The Hoosiers then drove 58 yards in 11 plays, ending in Mendoza's one-yard touchdown pass to Omar Cooper Jr. just before the half to give the Hoosiers 17–0 advantage at halftime.

Alabama received the kickoff to start the second half and went three-and-out. Indiana then drove 79 yards in 10 plays, scoring a touchdown on a 24-yard deep pass from Mendoza to receiver Elijah Sarratt down the left sideline on 3rd down and 1, to make the score 24–0. Before Alabama's next drive, Simpson was replaced by backup quarterback Austin Mack due to a cracked rib he received on the hit by Ponds earlier in the game. Mack completed his first five passes, including completions of 30 and 16 yards, as he drove the Crimson Tide to the Indiana 5-yard line. However, a completion for a loss of five yards and an incompletion caused Alabama to settle for a 28-yard field goal from Conor Talty, cutting the margin to 24–3. The Hoosiers scored touchdowns on each of their next two drives, sandwiched around an Alabama punt: the first score came on a 25-yard run from Kaelon Black, and the next came on an 18-yard run from Hemby, to give the Hoosiers an insurmountable 38–3 lead. Alabama led a final 11-play drive that ended in a fourth-down sack by Indiana; then, Hoosier backup quarterback Alberto Mendoza relieved his brother Fernando and led the Hoosiers on a nine-play drive to run out the last 5:40 of the game.

== Statistics ==
Team statistical comparison
Statistic	Alabama	Indiana
First downs	11	22
First downs rushing	2	14
First downs passing	9	7
First downs penalty	0	1
Third down efficiency	3–11	9–14
Fourth down efficiency	0–2	0–0
Total plays–net yards	50–193	66–407
Rushing attempts–net yards	17–23	50–215
Yards per rush	1.4	4.3
Yards passing	170	192
Pass completions–attempts	24–33	14–16
Interceptions thrown	0	0
Punt returns–total yards	0–0	2–16
Kickoff returns–total yards	1–14	0–0
Punts–average yardage	4–43.0	2–41.5
Fumbles–lost	2–1	0–0
Penalties–yards	1–5	1–10
Time of possession	25:39	34:21

Alabama statistics
Crimson Tide passing
	C–A	Yds	TD–INT
Austin Mack	11–16	103	0–0
Ty Simpson	12–16	67	0–0
Daniel Hill	1–1	0	0–0
Crimson Tide rushing
	Car	Yds	TD
Ty Simpson	3	17	0
Daniel Hill	5	13	0
Kevin Riley	3	2	0
TEAM	1	−1	0
Austin Mack	5	−8	0
Crimson Tide receiving
	Rec	Yds	TD
Germie Bernard	4	60	0
Ryan Coleman-Williams	6	53	0
Josh Cuevas	4	35	0
Isaiah Horton	2	16	0
Daniel Hill	7	5	0
Jam Miller	1	1	0

Indiana statistics
Hoosiers passing
	C–A	Yds	TD–INT
Fernando Mendoza	14–16	192	3–0
Hoosiers rushing
	Car	Yds	TD
Kaelon Black	15	99	1
Roman Hemby	18	89	1
Fernando Mendoza	8	16	0
Khobie Martin	4	11	0
Alberto Mendoza	2	6	0
TEAM	3	−6	0
Hoosiers receiving
	Rec	Yds	TD
Charlie Becker	2	51	1
Omar Cooper Jr.	3	45	1
Elijah Sarratt	4	40	1
Riley Nowakowski	3	36	0
Kaelon Black	1	11	0
E.J. Williams Jr.	1	9	0
