= Chiddi Obiazor =

American college football player

No. 7 – Indiana Hoosiers
- Position: Defensive lineman
- Class: Senior

Personal information
- Born: August 21, 2004 (age 22); Eden Prairie, MN, United States
- Listed height: 6 ft 5 in (1.96 m)
- Listed weight: 280 lb (127 kg)

Career information
- High school: Eden Prairie High School
- College: Kansas State (2023-26); Indiana (2026-present)
- Stats at ESPN

Chiddi Obiazor (born August 21, 2004) is an American college football defensive lineman for the Indiana Hoosiers. He previously played for the Kansas State Wildcats.

== Early life and high school career ==
Obiazor attended Eden Prairie High School in Eden Prairie, Minnesota. Obiazor also played varsity basketball at Eden Prairie. He departed the basketball team after Eden Prairie head coach David Flom was suspended for using racist language. He had previously played as a forward, averaging 16.3 points per game his senior year.

== College career ==
=== Kansas State ===
Obiazor made his first career tackle against the Southeast Missouri State Redhawks on September 2, 2023. He also had his first tackle for loss against the NC State Wolfpack in the 2023 Pop-Tarts Bowl.

=== Indiana ===
On January 5, 2026, Obiazor committed to play for the Indiana Hoosiers with two years of eligibility remaining. He joined his fellow former Kansas State defensive lineman Tobi Osunsanmi who committed to the Hoosiers one day prior.

== Personal life ==
Obiazor is the younger brother of New England Patriots linebacker Namdi Obiazor. He also has two sisters, Isy and his twin Nneka. His family is of Nigerian descent.

== Career statistics ==
| Year | Team | GP | Tackles | | | | | Interceptions | | | | | Fumbles | | | |
| Year | Team | GP | Solo | Ast | Cmb | TfL | Sck | Int | Yds | Avg | TD | PD | FR | Yds | TD | FF |
|---|---|---|---|---|---|---|---|---|---|---|---|---|---|---|---|---|
| 2023 | Kansas State | 3 | 1 | 1 | 2 | 0.5 | 0.5 | 0 | 0 | 0 | 0 | 0 | 0 | 0 | 0 | 0 |
| 2024 | Kansas State | 13 | 9 | 7 | 16 | 5.0 | 3.5 | 0 | 0 | 0 | 0 | 3 | 0 | 0 | 0 | 0 |
| 2025 | Kansas State | 12 | 17 | 11 | 28 | 4.5 | 2.0 | 0 | 0 | 0 | 0 | 1 | 1 | 0 | 0 | 0 |
| 2026 | Indiana | 6 | 1 | 4 | 5 | 1.0 | 0.0 | 0 | 0 | 0 | 0 | 0 | 0 | 0 | 0 | 0 |
| Career | | 34 | 28 | 23 | 51 | 11.0 | 6.0 | 0 | 0 | 0 | 0 | 4 | 1 | 0 | 0 | 0 |
