= Namdi Obiazor =

American football player (born 2002)

No. 48 – New England Patriots
- Position: Linebacker
- Roster status: Active

Personal information
- Born: April 19, 2002 (age 24)
- Listed height: 6 ft 3 in (1.91 m)
- Listed weight: 229 lb (104 kg)

Career information
- High school: Eden Prairie (Eden Prairie, Minnesota)
- College: Iowa Western (2020–2021); TCU (2022–2025)
- NFL draft: 2026: 6th round, 212th overall pick

Career history
- New England Patriots (2026–present)

Career NFL statistics as of Week 4, 2026
- Total tackles: 6
- Stats at Pro Football Reference

Namdi Obiazor (pronounced NAM-dee oh-bee-EYE-zhor) (born April 19, 2002) is an American professional football linebacker for the New England Patriots of the National Football League (NFL). He played college football for the Iowa Western Reivers and TCU Horned Frogs. Obiazor was selected by the Patriots in the sixth round of the 2026 NFL draft.

== Early life ==
Obiazor attended Eden Prairie High School in Eden Prairie, Minnesota. Coming out of high school, he committed to play college football at Iowa Western Community College.

== College career ==
=== Iowa Western CC ===
Obiazor played two seasons at Iowa Western Community College from 2020 to 2021, earning JUCO All-American honors as a sophomore.

=== TCU ===
Obiazor committed to play for the TCU Horned Frogs. In his first season with the team in 2022 he played in all 15 games with two starts, notching 49 tackles. During the 2023 season, Obiazor started all 12 games, recording 84 tackles with six being for a loss and four sacks. In the 2024 season, he tallied 81 tackles with two and a half going for a loss and an interception. In week 6 of the 2025 season, Obiazor was named the Big 12 Defensive Player of the Week in a victory over Colorado, after totaling ten tackles, a forced fumble, and an interception.

== Professional career ==
Pre-draft measurables
Height	Weight	Arm length	Hand span	Wingspan	40-yard dash	10-yard split	20-yard split	20-yard shuttle	Three-cone drill	Vertical jump	Broad jump	Bench press
6 ft 2 3/4 in (1.90 m)	229 lb (104 kg)	30 3/4 in (0.78 m)	10 1/2 in (0.27 m)	6 ft 3 3/4 in (1.92 m)	4.53 s	1.56 s	2.62 s	4.36 s	7.24 s	37.0 in (0.94 m)	9 ft 11 in (3.02 m)	21 reps
All values from NFL Combine/Pro Day

Obiazor was selected by the New England Patriots in the sixth round with the 212th overall pick in the 2026 NFL draft.

== Personal life ==
Obiazor has two sisters and is the older brother of Indiana defensive end Chiddi Obiazor. He is of Nigerian descent.
