= Leo High School (Indiana) =

Location
- 14600 Amstutz Road; Leo-Cedarville, Indiana 46785; United States; 41°13′11″N 85°1′7″W

Information
- Type: Public
- Locale: Suburban
- School district: East Allen County Schools
- Principal: Chad Houser
- JH Principal: Katie Metz
- Teaching staff: 76.20 (FTE)
- Grades: 9–12
- Enrollment: 1,328 (2024–2025)
- Student to teacher ratio: 17.43
- Colors: Purple and white
- Mascot: Lion
- Feeder schools: Leo Junior High School
- Website: lhs.eacs.k12.in.us

Leo High School is an East Allen County Schools high school located in Leo-Cedarville, Indiana. It serves Leo-Cedarville and Grabill.

== Athletics ==
Leo currently competes in the Northeast Eight Conference. They were previously in the Allen County Athletic Conference (ACAC) and left in 2015. In addition to the IHSAA sanctioned sports, they also have competed in boys' rugby, boys' and girls lacrosse, and boys' ice hockey.

State Championships
Sport	Year(s)
Softball	2014
Hockey	2012, 2014, 2016
Rugby	2018, 2019, 2023

== Notable alumni ==
- Jon Neuhouser, Butler University basketball player, 1997 Midwestern Collegiate Conference Player of the Year
- Cameron Newbauer, women's basketball coach for the University of Florida and Belmont University
- Mark Souder, United States Representative for the Indiana 3rd Congressional district (1995–2010)
- Mike Augustyniak, professional football player for the New York Jets (1981–1983)
- Andy Bayer, professional track and field athlete
- Tyler Johnson, Indiana Senate (2022–present)
- Brock Schott, collegiate football tight end for the Miami Hurricanes and Indiana Hoosiers

== See also ==
- List of high schools in Indiana
- Northeast Eight Conference
