= Brock Schott =

No. 88 – Indiana Hoosiers
- Position: Tight end
- Class: Sophomore

Personal information
- Born: August 13, 2006 (age 20); Fort Wayne, IN, United States
- Listed height: 6 ft 3 in (1.91 m)
- Listed weight: 245 lb (111 kg)

Career information
- High school: Leo High School (Leo, Indiana)
- College: Miami (2025-26); Indiana (2026-present)
- Stats at ESPN

Brock Schott (born August 13, 2006) is an American college football tight end for the Indiana Hoosiers. He previously played for the Miami Hurricanes.

== Early life and high school career ==
Schott played both tight end and defensive end while at Leo. In Schott's freshman season, he had four receptions for 44 yards and a touchdown. On defense, Schott had four tackles. In Schott's sophomore year, Schott caught 34 passes for 468 yards and seven touchdowns. On defense, Schott had 61 total tackles and 20.5 tackles for loss. In his junior year, Schott had 35 receptions for 743 yards and six touchdowns. Schott on defense had 67 total tackles and 32 tackles for loss. Schott won the Indiana Mr. Football for tight ends. In his senior year, Schott had 28 receptions for 462 yards and five touchdowns. On defense Schott had 52 tackles and 17 tackles for loss. Schott was recruited primarily as a tight end and was rated a 4-star recruit by 247sports and committed to play for the Miami Hurricanes over offers from Ohio State, Florida State, Iowa, and Wisconsin, among others.

== College career ==
=== Miami ===
Schott made his debut on September 6, 2025, against the Bethune-Cookman Wildcats, where he caught two passes for 24 yards.

=== Indiana ===
On January 5, 2026, Schott committed to play for the Hoosiers with 4 years of eligibility remaining. He was recruited and offered by Indiana out of high school prior to his commitment to Miami.

He made his first catch for the Hoosiers against North Texas on September 5, 2026, for 25 yards.

== Personal life ==
Schott has a younger brother, Theo, who is currently a tight end at Zionsville High School in the class of 2028.

== Career statistics ==
Year	Team	GP	Receiving			
Year	Team	GP	Rec	Yds	Avg	TD
2025	Miami	2	2	24	12	0
2026	Indiana	10	7	94	13.4	1
Career		12	9	118	13.1	1
