= Joshua Burnham =

American football player (born 2004)

No. 8 – Indiana Hoosiers
- Position: Defensive end
- Class: Fifth year

Personal information
- Born: March 17, 2004 (age 22)
- Listed height: 6 ft 4 in (1.93 m)
- Listed weight: 260 lb (118 kg)

Career information
- High school: Traverse City Central (Traverse City, Michigan)
- College: Notre Dame (2022–2025); Indiana (2026–present)
- Stats at ESPN

Joshua David Burnham (born March 17, 2004) is an American college football defensive end for the Indiana Hoosiers of the Big Ten Conference. He previously played for the Notre Dame Fighting Irish.

== Early life ==
Burnham attended Traverse City Central High School in Traverse City, Michigan. During his sophomore year, he recorded 88 tackles with 12 being for a loss, three sacks, and three interceptions. In his senior season, Burnham put up 2,000 total yards and 30 touchdowns on offense, while also making 61 tackles. Coming out of high school, he was rated as a four-star recruit, the 9th overall outside linebacker, and the 2nd overall prospect in the state of Michigan by 247Sports, and committed to play college football for the Notre Dame Fighting Irish over offers from other schools such as Michigan and Wisconsin.

== College career ==
=== Notre Dame ===
As a freshman in 2022, Burnham played one game, notching half a tackle for a loss. In 2023, he totaled 18 tackles with four being for a loss and a sack. During the 2025 College Football Playoff National Championship, Burnham had two sacks in a loss to Ohio State. He finished the 2024 season with 30 tackles with six and a half being for a loss and two sacks in 10 starts. In the 2025 season opener, Burnham totaled two tackles against Miami. In week 10, he recorded three tackles for a loss and a sack in a victory versus Boston College. Burnham finished the 2025 season, playing in all 12 games, recording 16 tackles with six being for a loss and three sacks. After the conclusion of the season, he entered the NCAA transfer portal.

=== Statistics ===
Year	Team	GP	Tackles				Interceptions				Fumbles		
Year	Team	GP	Total	Solo	Ast	Sack	PD	Int	Yds	TD	FF	FR	TD
2022	Notre Dame	1	1	0	1	0.0	0	0	0	0	0	0	0
2023	Notre Dame	13	18	10	8	1.0	0	0	0	0	0	0	0
2024	Notre Dame	14	30	16	14	2.0	1	0	0	0	1	1	0
2025	Notre Dame	12	16	10	6	3.0	1	0	0	0	0	0	0
2026	Indiana	6	9	3	6	1.0	0	0	0	0	0	0	0
Career		46	74	39	35	7.0	2	0	0	0	1	1	0
