= Jacob Savage =

American football player (born 2007)

- Savage in 2026

No. 21 – Indiana Hoosiers
- Position: Linebacker
- Class: Freshman

Personal information
- Born: December 27, 2007 (age 18); Union, KY, United States
- Listed height: 6 ft 0 in (1.83 m)
- Listed weight: 225 lb (102 kg)

Career information
- High school: Ryle High School (Union, Kentucky)
- College: Indiana (2026-present)
- Stats at ESPN

Jacob Savage (born December 27, 2007) is an American college football linebacker for the Indiana Hoosiers.

== Early life ==
Savage attended Ryle High School in Union, Kentucky. Savage played running back and linebacker on the school's football team. In Savage's freshman season, he totaled 93 tackles. In his sophomore year, Savage led the state in tackles with 163. In his junior year, Savage made 141 tackles with 8.0 tackles for loss. In his senior year, Savage had 24 rushing touchdowns and 29 total touchdowns with 112 tackles and 15.0 tackles for loss on defense. In his senior year, Savage was named the MaxPreps player of the year in Kentucky. Savage as a senior also won the Paul Hornung award (not to be confused with the collegiate award of the same name), given to the best high school football player in Kentucky. Savage ended his high school career with a program record of 511 career tackles, 39.0 tackles for loss, 3,584 career all-purpose yards and 65 total touchdowns, and 749 yards receiving with 2,835 yards rushing. Savage was recruited as a three-star linebacker by 247Sports and committed to Indiana over offers from Northwestern, Purdue, Minnesota, and Louisville among others.

== College career ==
=== Indiana ===
Savage running against Minnesota

In week 4 against the Northwestern Wildcats, Savage made his first collegiate start at the linebacker position for the Hoosiers. In week 8 against the Michigan Wolverines, Savage recorded seven total tackles and a tackle for loss.

== Personal life ==
In a 2025 interview with The Daily Hoosier, Savage said he had started to like football in third grade because he enjoyed scoring touchdowns and hitting people. He has a brother, Gabe, who also played football for Ryle High School, and played collegiate rugby for the Army Black Knights from 2022 to 2026.

Savage is known for the combination of his last name and jersey number, which appear similar to the name of rapper 21 Savage.

== Career statistics ==
Year	Team	GP	Tackles				Interceptions				Fumbles		
Year	Team	GP	Total	Solo	Ast	Sack	PD	Int	Yds	TD	FF	FR	TD
2026	Indiana	9	38	19	19	1	3	0	0	0	0	0	0
Career		9	38	19	19	1	3	0	0	0	0	0	0
