= Adedamola Ajani =

Nigerian-American football player

No. 72 – Indiana Hoosiers
- Position: Offensive lineman
- Class: Redshirt Sophomore

Personal information
- Born: Nigeria
- Listed height: 6 ft 4 in (1.93 m)
- Listed weight: 305 lb (138 kg)

Career information
- High school: Speedway (Speedway, Indiana)
- College: Indiana (2024–present)

Awards and highlights
- CFP national champion (2025)
- Stats at ESPN

Adedamola Ajani is a Nigerian-American college football offensive lineman for the Indiana Hoosiers.

== Early life ==
Ajani was born in Nigeria but grew up in Odessa, Texas and in Indianapolis, Indiana. He attended Speedway Senior High School in Speedway, Indiana. Ajani was a three-year letterman in football, while also playing basketball and track and field. As a three-star recruit, he committed to play college football at Indiana University.

== College career ==
Ajani played in three games as a true freshman and redshirted. As a redshirt freshman, he appeared in 12 games, where he played as a tackle and guard on both sides of the line with four starts. The fourth start for Ajani game during the 2026 Rose Bowl at right tackle and allowed just one pressure. During the 2026 CFP National Championship game, he played 46 snaps at right tackle as the Hoosiers won their first national championship. Prior to the start of the 2026 season, coach Curt Cignetti announced Ajani would move right guard.
