= Jon Neuhouser =

American basketball player

Personal information
- Listed height: 6 ft 6 in (1.98 m)
- Listed weight: 220 lb (100 kg)

Career information
- High school: Leo (Leo-Cedarville, Indiana)
- College: Butler (1994–1998)
- NBA draft: 1998: undrafted
- Position: Forward

Career highlights
- MCC Player of the Year (1997); MCC tournament MVP (1998)

Jon Neuhouser is an American former basketball player. A forward, Neuhouser was named Midwestern Collegiate Conference Player of the Year in 1997. Neuhouser joined the Butler Bulldogs beginning the 1995–96 season after graduating from and playing basketball for Leo Junior/Senior High School in Leo-Cedarville, Indiana.

== Butler Bulldogs ==
Neuhouser helped lead Butler to back-to-back NCAA Tournament appearances in his final two seasons. Aside from being the conference player of the year in 1997, Neuhouser was twice named first team all-league, was named Butler's Most Valuable Player in 1996–97, and was selected as the MCC tournament Most Valuable Player in 1998.

Neuhouser led the Bulldogs in scoring for three straight seasons, 1996–1998, and is the only player in Butler men's basketball history to lead the team in rebounding for four consecutive seasons. He finished his career with 1,485 points, which ranks 10th on Butler's all-time scoring list, and 719 rebounds, which ranks sixth on the school's all-time rebounding chart. He was named to Butler's Hall of Fame in 2009.
