= Amare Ferrell =

American football player (born 2005)

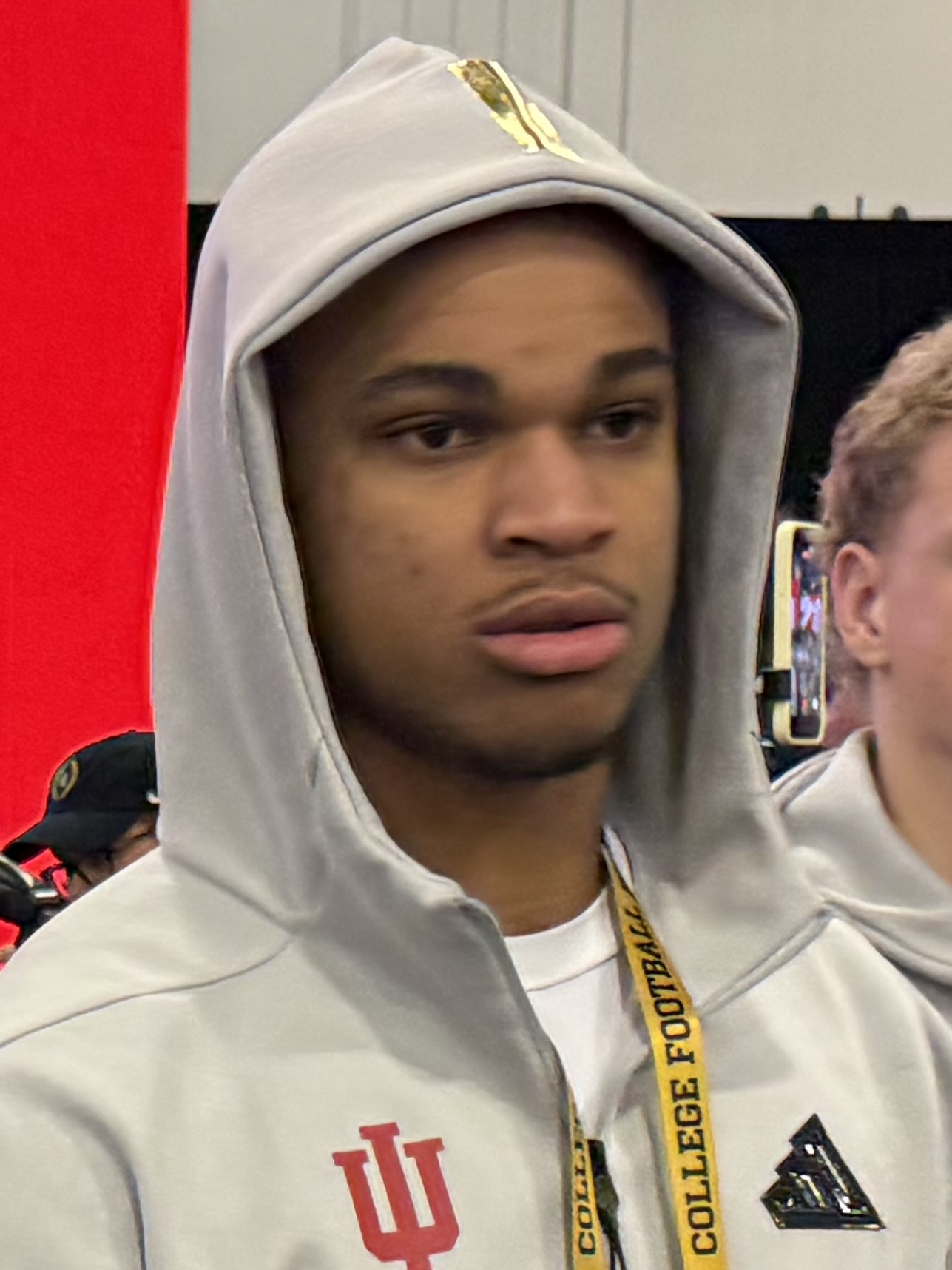
- Ferrell in 2026

No. 1 – Indiana Hoosiers
- Position: Safety
- Class: Senior

Personal information
- Born: June 14, 2005 (age 21)
- Listed height: 6 ft 2 in (1.88 m)
- Listed weight: 205 lb (93 kg)

Career information
- High school: Columbia (Lake City, Florida)
- College: Indiana (2023–present)

Awards and highlights
- CFP national champion (2025); Second-team All-Big Ten (2025)
- Stats at ESPN

Amare Ferrell (born June 14, 2005) is an American college football safety for the Indiana Hoosiers.

== Early life ==
Ferrell attended Columbia High School in Lake City, Florida. He was rated as a three-star recruit and committed to play college football for the Indiana Hoosiers over offers from schools such as Cincinnati, Florida State, Louisville, Kentucky, Miami, and Penn State.

== College career ==
As a freshman in 2023, Ferrell appeared in all 12 games for the Hoosiers, totaling nine tackles. In the 2024 season opener, he recorded his first career interception against FIU. In week 3, Ferrell recorded an interception in the fourth quarter in a 42–13 win over UCLA. In 2025, Ferrell won the National Championship with the Hoosiers against the Miami Hurricanes.
