= D'Angelo Ponds =

American football player (born 2005)

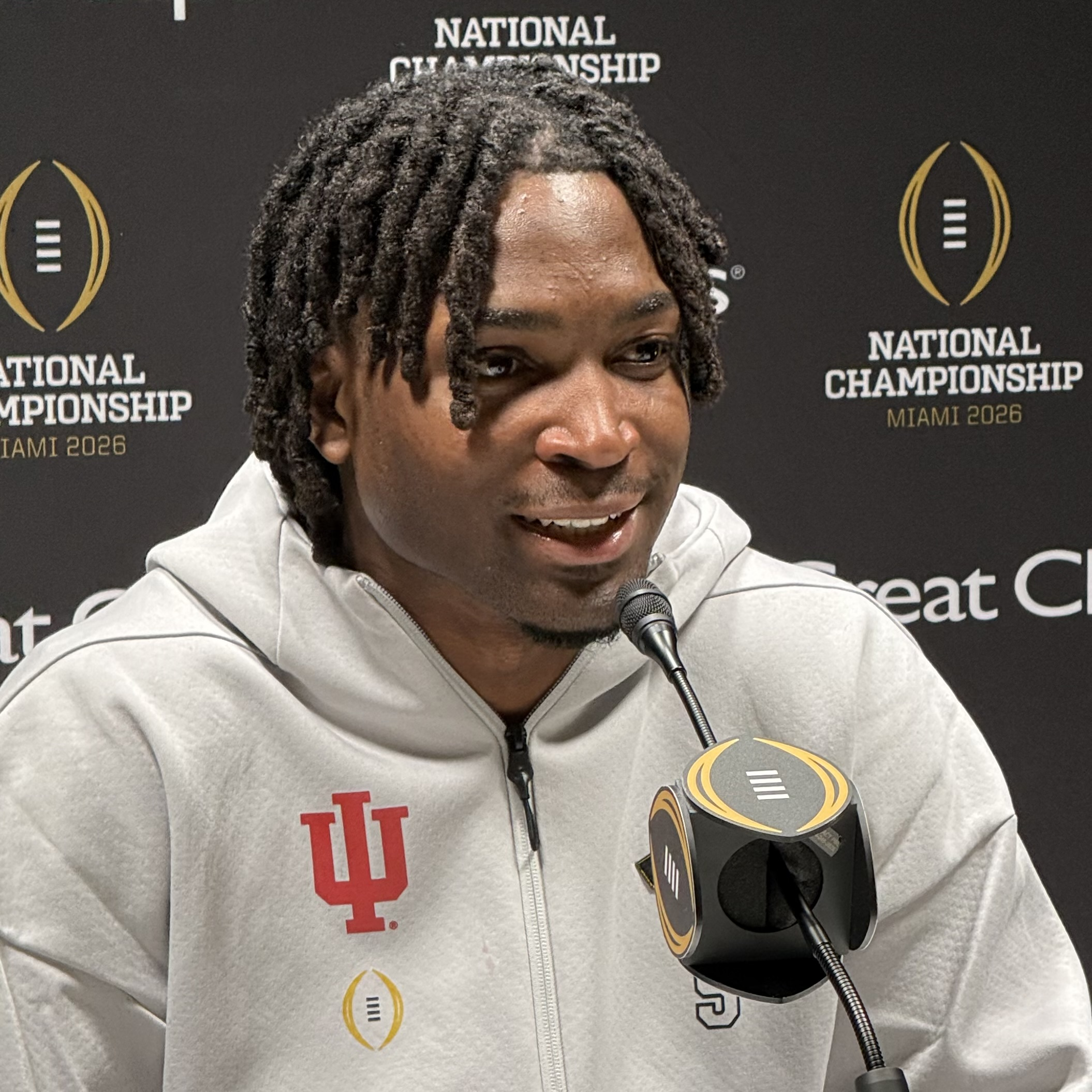
- Ponds in 2026

No. 23 – New York Jets
- Position: Cornerback
- Roster status: Active

Personal information
- Born: January 13, 2005 (age 21); Miami, Florida, U.S.
- Listed height: 5 ft 9 in (1.75 m)
- Listed weight: 182 lb (83 kg)

Career information
- High school: Chaminade-Madonna (Hollywood, Florida)
- College: James Madison (2023); Indiana (2024–2025)
- NFL draft: 2026: 2nd round, 50th overall pick

Career history
- New York Jets (2026–present)

Awards and highlights
- CFP national champion (2025); First-team All-American (2025); 2× First-team All-Big Ten (2024, 2025); Second-team All-Sun Belt (2023); Rose Bowl defensive Player of the Game (2026); Peach Bowl defensive Most Outstanding Player (2026)

Career NFL statistics as of Week 10, 2026
- Tackles: 7
- Pass deflections: 1
- Stats at Pro Football Reference

D'Angelo Ponds (born January 13, 2005) is an American professional football cornerback for the New York Jets of the National Football League (NFL). He played college football for the James Madison Dukes and Indiana Hoosiers and was selected by the Jets in the second round of the 2026 NFL draft.

== Early life ==
Ponds was born in Miami, Florida and attended Chaminade-Madonna College Preparatory School in Hollywood, Florida. He was rated as a three-star recruit when he committed to play college football for the James Madison Dukes.

== College career ==
=== James Madison ===
As a true freshman in 2023, Ponds appeared in all 13 games with ten starts for the Dukes, where he totaled 51 tackles, 13 pass deflections, two interceptions, and a touchdown. For his performance, he earned Freshman All-American and second-team all-Sun Belt Conference honors. After the season, Ponds entered his name into the NCAA transfer portal.

=== Indiana ===
Ponds transferred to play for the Indiana Hoosiers. In week 9 of the 2024 season, he notched two interceptions, one of which he returned for a touchdown, in a win over Washington, and was named the Big Ten Conference defensive player of the week. After a 38–3 win over Alabama in the 2026 Rose Bowl, Ponds was named defensive player of the game. On the first snap of the 2026 Peach Bowl, Ponds scored a pick-six against Oregon and was named defensive player of the game.

On January 13, 2026, the City of Bloomington temporarily renamed the retention pond at Millers-Shower Park “D’Angelo’s Pond” in recognition of his performance in the 2026 Peach Bowl.

== Professional career ==
Pre-draft measurables
Height	Weight	Arm length	Hand span	Wingspan	40-yard dash	10-yard split	20-yard split	20-yard shuttle	Vertical jump
5 ft 8 5/8 in (1.74 m)	182 lb (83 kg)	29 3/8 in (0.75 m)	9 5/8 in (0.24 m)	6 ft 0 1/4 in (1.84 m)	4.37 s	1.52 s	2.48 s	4.27 s	43.5 in (1.10 m)
All values from NFL Combine/Pro Day

Ponds was selected by the New York Jets in the second round (50th overall) of the 2026 NFL draft. On May 8, 2026, Ponds signed a four-year deal with the Jets worth $9.84 million with $8.95 million guaranteed.
