= Kellan Wyatt =

American football player

No. 13 – Indiana Hoosiers
- Position: Defensive lineman
- Class: Senior

Personal information
- Listed height: 6 ft 2 in (1.88 m)
- Listed weight: 257 lb (117 kg)

Career information
- High school: Archbishop Spalding (Severn, Maryland)
- College: Maryland (2022–2024); Indiana (2025–present)

Awards and highlights
- CFP national champion (2025)
- Stats at ESPN

Kellan Wyatt is an American college football defensive end for the Indiana Hoosiers. He previously played for the Maryland Terrapins.

== Early life ==
Wyatt attended Archbishop Spalding High School in Severn, Maryland. He committed to play college football for the Maryland Terrapins.

== College career ==
In three years at Maryland from 2022 to 2024, Wyatt played in 35 games with 28 starts, totaling 80 tackles with 15 being for a loss, eight and a half sacks, and two forced fumbles. After the 2024 season, he entered the NCAA transfer portal.

Wyatt transferred to play for the Indiana Hoosiers. In week 8 of the 2025 season, he suffered a season-ending knee injury. Wyatt finished the season with 27 tackles with eight being for a loss, two and a half sacks, and a pass deflection in seven starts. Heading into the 2026 season, he announced that he was returning to the Hoosiers after being granted a fifth year of eligibility.
