= Mario Landino =

American football player (born 2006)

No. 97 – Indiana Hoosiers
- Position: Defensive lineman
- Class: Junior

Personal information
- Born: January 9, 2006 (age 20); San Jose, California , U.S.
- Listed height: 6 ft 4 in (1.93 m)
- Listed weight: 290 lb (132 kg)

Career information
- High school: Emmaus (Emmaus, Pennsylvania)
- College: Indiana (2024–present)

Awards and highlights
- CFP national champion (2025)
- Stats at ESPN

Mario Landino (born January 9, 2006) is an American college football defensive lineman for the Indiana Hoosiers.

== Early life ==
Landino attended Emmaus High School in Emmaus, Pennsylvania. As a senior at Emmaus, he totaled 102 tackles with 20 tackles for loss and three sacks.

Landino originally committed to James Madison, but flipped his commitment to play at Indiana after James Madison head coach Curt Cignetti was hired as Indiana's head coach in 2024.

== College career ==
Landino earned playing time as a true freshman, totaling nine tackles, a forced fumble, and 0.5 sacks. Indiana won the College Football National Championship in Landino's sophomore season, where his defensive role increased, collecting 5 sacks, 32 tackles, and two fumble recoveries, with both turnovers coming from the Peach Bowl vs. Oregon, in which the Hoosiers dominated 56–22.
