= Shazz Preston =

American football receiver (born 2003)

No. 7 – Indiana Hoosiers
- Position: Wide receiver
- Class: (redshirt) Senior

Personal information
- Born: October 20, 2003 (age 23)
- Listed height: 6 ft 0 in (1.83 m)
- Listed weight: 205 lb (93 kg)

Career information
- High school: St. James (St. James, Louisiana)
- College: Alabama (2022–2023); Tulane (2024–2025); Indiana (2026–present)
- Stats at ESPN

Shazz Preston (born October 20, 2003) is an American college football wide receiver for the Indiana Hoosiers. He previously played for the Alabama Crimson Tide and Tulane Green Wave.

== Early life ==
Preston attended St. James High School in Saint James, Louisiana. He competed in football, basketball, and track and field while in high school. Preston was ranked by ESPN as the No. 16 recruit in college football's class of 2022 and the No. 3 receiver. He committed to the Alabama Crimson Tide.

== College career ==
Preston enrolled at the University of Alabama in May 2022. On January 2, 2024, he announced that he would be entering the transfer portal. On January 15, Preston announced that he would transfer to Tulane. On December 26, 2025, he announced that he would enter the transfer portal for the second time.
