= Joe Brunner =

American football player

No. 56 – Indiana Hoosiers
- Position: Offensive guard
- Class: Redshirt Senior

Personal information
- Listed height: 6 ft 7 in (2.01 m)
- Listed weight: 313 lb (142 kg)

Career information
- High school: Whitefish Bay (Whitefish Bay, Wisconsin)
- College: Wisconsin (2022–2025); Indiana (2026–present)
- Stats at ESPN

Joe Brunner is an American college football offensive guard for the Indiana Hoosiers. He previously played for the Wisconsin Badgers.

== Early life ==
Brunner attended Whitefish Bay High School in Whitefish Bay, Wisconsin, where he played both football and basketball. He was rated as a four-star recruit and committed to play college football for the Wisconsin Badgers over offers from schools such as Notre Dame, Ohio State, LSU, Oregon, Florida State, Miami (FL), Tennessee, Michigan, and Penn State. He was also rated as the 8th overall offensive tackle and the best player in the state of Wisconsin in the 2022 class.

== College career ==
In his first two seasons in 2022 and 2023, Brunner combined to play in 15 games, while also utilizing a redshirt season in 2022. Heading into the 2024 season, he earned a starting spot at guard on the Badger offensive line. In 2024, Brunner started in all 12 games at left guard. He was part of a Badger offensive line that allowed only 13.0 sacks, the fewest in the Big Ten that season.
