= Rolijah Hardy =

American football player (born 2004)

No. 5 – Indiana Hoosiers
- Position: Linebacker
- Class: Redshirt Junior

Personal information
- Born: September 10, 2004 (age 22)
- Listed height: 5 ft 11 in (1.80 m)
- Listed weight: 227 lb (103 kg)

Career information
- High school: Lakeland (Lakeland, Florida)
- College: Navy (2023); Indiana (2024–present)

Awards and highlights
- CFP national champion (2025); Second-team All-Big Ten (2025)
- Stats at ESPN

Rolijah Hardy (born September 10, 2004) is an American football linebacker for the Indiana Hoosiers. He previously played for the Navy Midshipmen.

== Early life ==
Hardy attended high school at Lakeland located in Lakeland, Florida, where he was a four-year varsity athlete for football and basketball. Coming out of high school, he committed to play college football for the Navy Midshipmen.

== College career ==
=== Navy ===
After just one season with the Midshipmen in 2023, Hardy decided to enter his name into the NCAA transfer portal.

=== Indiana ===
Hardy transferred to play for the Indiana Hoosiers. In week two of the 2024 season, Hardy notched two tackles with one being for a loss, a sack, a forced fumble, and an interception which he returned for a touchdown in a blowout win over Western Illinois. He finished his freshman season in 2024, appearing in 13 games with four starts, recording 22 tackles with five and a half going for a loss, two interceptions, and two forced fumbles. Heading into the 2025 season, Hardy entered the year as a full-time starter for the Hoosiers. In week seven of the 2025 season, he recorded 13 tackles with two being for a loss, and a sack in an upset win versus Oregon. In week eight, Hardy put up two sacks in a victory against Michigan State.

== Career Statistics ==
	Games		Tackles					Interceptions						Fumbles	
	GP	GS	Comb	Solo	Ast	TFL	Sck	PD	Int	Yds	Avg	Lng	TD	FF	FR
2024	13	4	22	12	10	5.5	1.0	0	2	18	9.0	12	1	2	0
2025	16	16	103	48	55	15.0	8.0	5	0	0	0	0	0	0	0
2026	8	4	58	35	23	5.5	2.0	1	1	19	19.0	19	1	0	0
