= Paddy McAteer =

Northern Irish player of American football

No. 35 – Indiana Hoosiers
- Position: Placekicker
- Class: Senior

Personal information
- Listed height: 6 ft 2 in (1.88 m)
- Listed weight: 204 lb (93 kg)

Career information
- High school: St Colman's (Newry, Northern Ireland)
- College: Troy (2024–2025); Indiana (2026–present)
- Stats at ESPN

Paddy McAteer is a Northern Irish college football placekicker for the Indiana Hoosiers.

== Early life ==
McAteer is from Mullaghbawn, Northern Ireland. He attended secondary school at St Colman's College in Newry and university at St Mary's University College in Belfast. McAteer played Gaelic football for Mullaghbawn Cúchullain's GFC of the Gaelic Athletic Association (GAA).

== College career ==
After attending a kicking camp in the United States, McAteer committed to play American college football for the Troy Trojans in July 2024; Troy offered McAteer a scholarship to play as a placekicker.

McAteer played primarily as a kickoff specialist at Troy. He recorded 59 kickoffs with 37 touchbacks in 12 games in 2024; in 2025, he recorded 64 kickoffs with 34 touchbacks in 14 games. However, he was named the Sun Belt Conference special teams player of the week after successfully kicking a 53-yard field goal, setting a school record, and additionally kicking a successful onside kick against the Texas State Bobcats on 12 October 2025.

McAteer transferred to play the 2026 season, his final year of NCAA eligibility, for the Indiana Hoosiers, still primarily as a kickoff specialist. On 31 October 2026 against the Minnesota Golden Gophers, McAteer successfully kicked a 60-yard field goal to tie the game seconds after Minnesota kicker Luke Drzewiecki converted a 60-yard field goal of his own, sending the game into overtime; the Hoosiers went on to win, 23–16. McAteer's field goal set an Indiana school record, and both kickers were named Big Ten Conference co-special teams players of the week.
