= Pat Coogan =

American football player (born 2002)

- Coogan with the Tennessee Titans in 2026

No. 79 – Tennessee Titans
- Position: Center
- Roster status: Active

Personal information
- Born: November 18, 2002 (age 23); Palos Heights, Illinois, U.S.
- Listed height: 6 ft 5 in (1.96 m)
- Listed weight: 310 lb (141 kg)

Career information
- High school: Marist High School (Chicago, Illinois)
- College: Notre Dame (2021–2024); Indiana (2025)
- NFL draft: 2026: 6th round, 194th overall pick

Career history
- Tennessee Titans (2026–present)

Awards and highlights
- CFP national champion (2025); Second-team All-Big Ten (2025); Rose Bowl offensive MVP (2026)

Career NFL statistics as of Week 4, 2026
- Games played: 4
- Stats at Pro Football Reference

Patrick Robert Coogan (born November 18, 2002) is an American professional football center for the Tennessee Titans of the National Football League (NFL). He played college football for the Indiana Hoosiers and the Notre Dame Fighting Irish and was selected by the Titans in the sixth round of the 2026 NFL draft.

== Early life ==
Coogan was born on November 18, 2002 in Palos Heights, Illinois. Coogan grew up in Palos Heights, with his three siblings and attended Marist High School in Chicago, where he played both football and baseball. Coming out of high school, Coogan was rated as a three-star recruit and committed to play college football for the Notre Dame Fighting Irish over other schools such as LSU, Ohio State, Texas A&M, and Oklahoma.

== College career ==
=== Notre Dame ===
After taking a redshirt as a freshman in 2021, Coogan played just one game in 2022. He took over as a starter on the offensive line in 2023 and made 13 starts for Notre Dame. After not starting the first three games for the 2024 season, Coogan took over as the team's starting center after injuries among the offensive line. He finished the 2024 season making 13 starts, including in all of the Fighting Irish's playoff games, and the 2025 National Championship. After the season, Coogan entered his name into the NCAA transfer portal.

=== Indiana ===
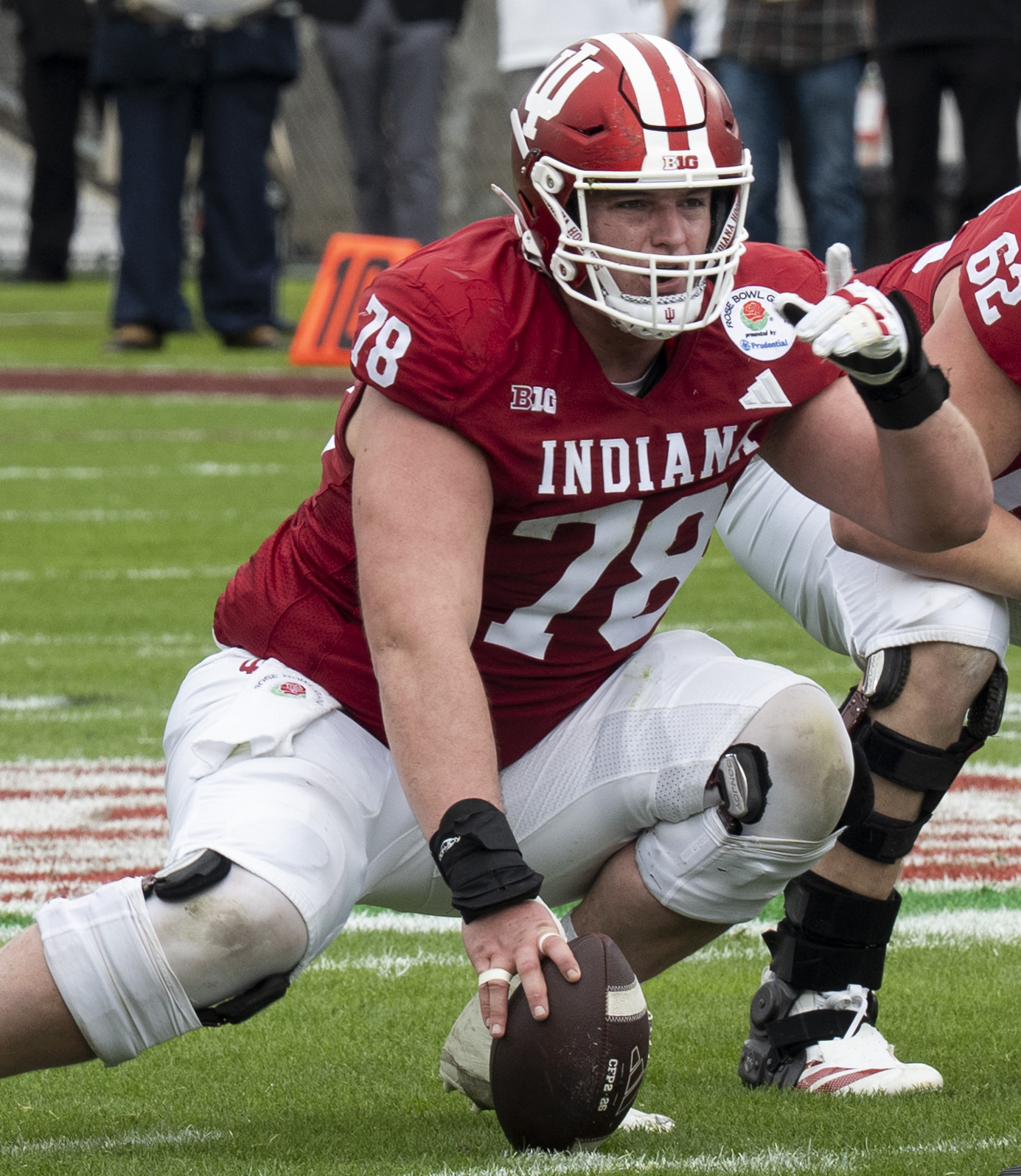
Coogan during the 2026 Rose Bowl.

Coogan transferred to play for the Indiana Hoosiers in 2025.

On January 1, 2026 Coogan won the Rose Bowl Championship and Rose Bowl Offensive MVP award.

On January 18, Coogan helped lead Indiana to the 2026 national championship.

== Professional career ==
Pre-draft measurables
Height	Weight	Arm length	Hand span	Wingspan	40-yard dash	10-yard split	20-yard split	20-yard shuttle	Three-cone drill	Vertical jump	Broad jump	Bench press
6 ft 5 3/8 in (1.97 m)	311 lb (141 kg)	31 1/8 in (0.79 m)	9 1/4 in (0.23 m)	6 ft 6 3/8 in (1.99 m)	5.19 s	1.87 s	3.03 s	4.93 s	7.82 s	29.0 in (0.74 m)	8 ft 11 in (2.72 m)	22 reps
All values from NFL Combine/Pro Day

Coogan was selected by the Tennessee Titans in the sixth round with the 194th overall pick of the 2026 NFL draft.
