= Tyrique Tucker =

American football player

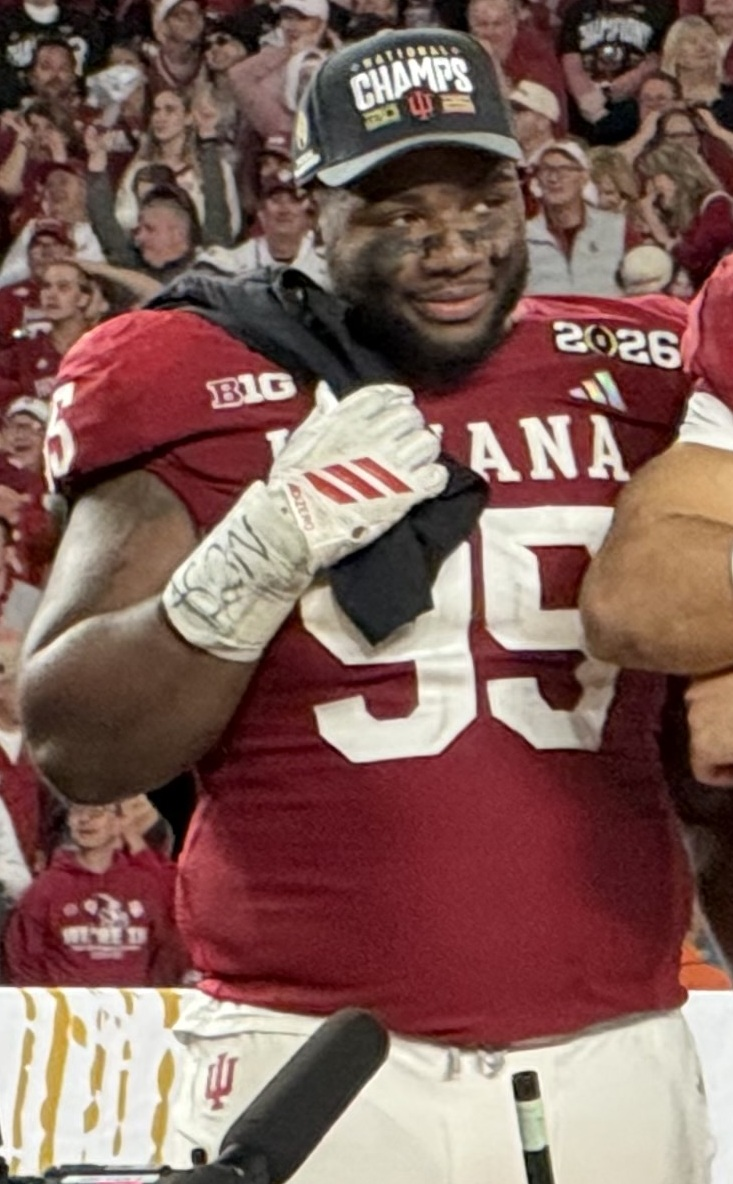
- Tucker in 2026

No. 95 – Indiana Hoosiers
- Position: Defensive tackle
- Class: Redshirt Senior

Personal information
- Listed height: 6 ft 0 in (1.83 m)
- Listed weight: 307 lb (139 kg)

Career information
- High school: Life Christian Academy (Colonial Heights, Virginia)
- College: James Madison (2022–2023); Indiana (2024–present)

Awards and highlights
- CFP national champion (2025); First-team All-Big Ten (2025)
- Stats at ESPN

Tyrique Tucker is an American college football defensive tackle for the Indiana Hoosiers. He previously played for the James Madison Dukes.

== Early life ==
Tucker attended Lake Taylor High School in Norfolk, Virginia for three years before transferring to Life Christian Academy in Colonial Heights, Virginia for his senior year. He committed to James Madison University (JMU) to play college football.

== College career ==
After redshirting his first year at JMU in 2022, Tucker started five of 13 games and had 30 tackles and 1.5 sacks in 2023. After JMU's head coach, Curt Cignetti, was hired by the Indiana Hoosiers, Tucker entered the transfer portal and followed his coach to Indiana. In his first season at Indiana, he played in 13 games and had 24 tackles and 2.5 sacks. Tucker entered the 2025 season as a starter.
