= Tobi Osunsanmi =

American football player (born 2004)

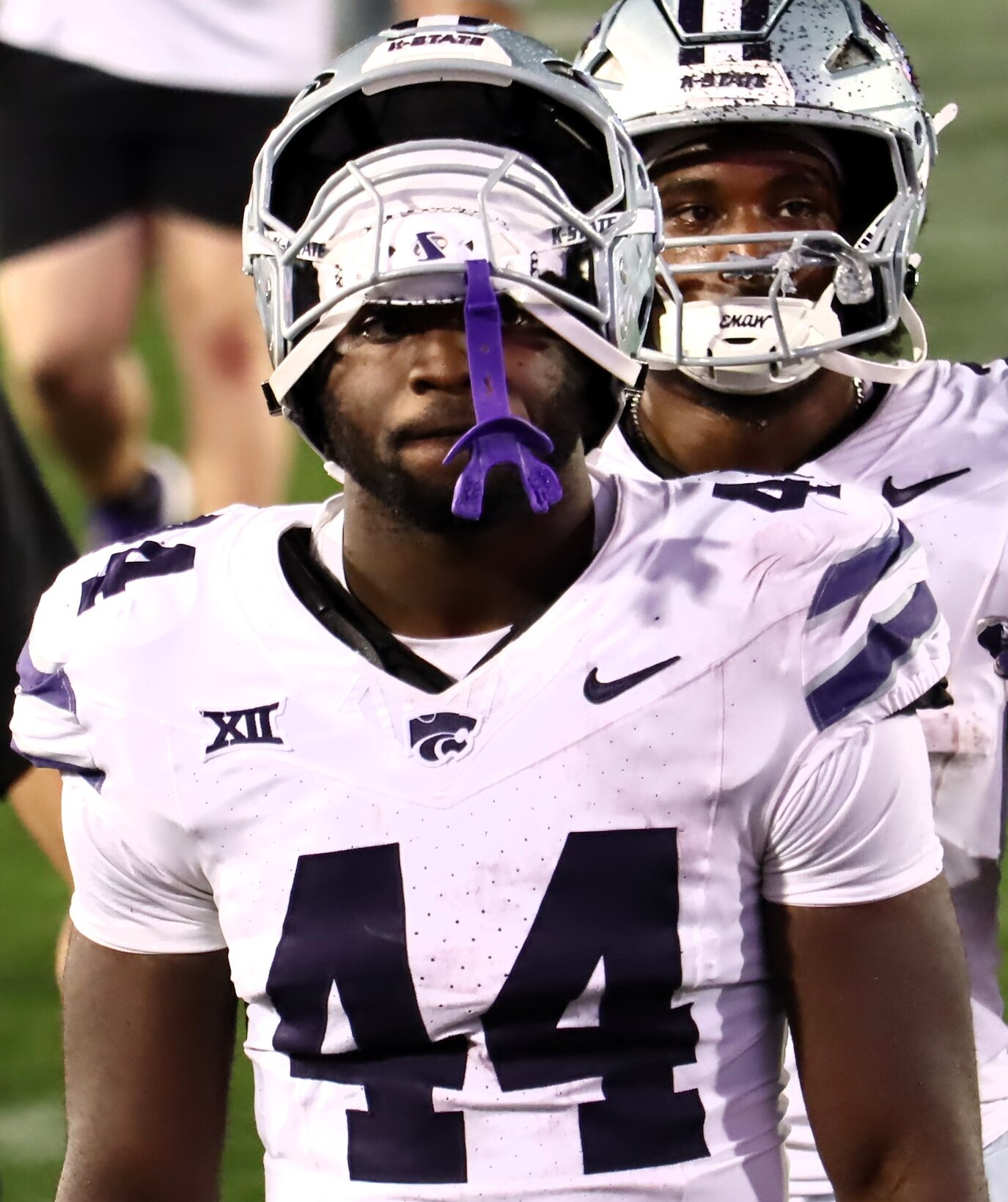
- Osunsanmi in 2024

No. 12 – Indiana Hoosiers
- Position: Defensive end
- Class: Redshirt Senior

Personal information
- Born: March 19, 2004 (age 22)
- Listed height: 6 ft 2 in (1.88 m)
- Listed weight: 251 lb (114 kg)

Career information
- High school: Wichita East (Wichita, Kansas)
- College: Kansas State (2022–2025); Indiana (2026–present)
- Stats at ESPN

Tobi Osunsanmi (born March 19, 2004) is an American football defensive end for the Indiana Hoosiers. He previously played for the Kansas State Wildcats.

== Early life ==
Osunsanmi attended Wichita East High School in Wichita, Kansas. He committed to play college football for the Kansas State Wildcats over offers from other schools such as Akron, Northern Iowa, and South Dakota State.

== College career ==
=== Kansas State ===
In his first two seasons from 2022 to 2023, Osunsanmi played as a linebacker in 17 games, recording 11 tackles with one being for a loss, a sack, and a forced fumble. Heading into the 2024 season, he transitioned to play as a defensive end. In week one of the 2024 season, Osunsanmi recorded a sack and a half in a win over UT Martin. He finished the 2024 season with 19 tackles, three and a half sacks, and a forced fumble. Osunsanmi only played six games in 2025 due to injury, notching 19 tackles with five being for loss and four sacks, and entered the NCAA transfer portal after the season.
