= Nico Radicic =

American football player

No. 15 – Indiana Hoosiers
- Position: Placekicker
- Class: Redshirt Sophomore

Personal information
- Born: California, U.S.
- Listed height: 5 ft 11 in (1.80 m)
- Listed weight: 193 lb (88 kg)

Career information
- High school: Coppell (Coppell, Texas)
- College: Indiana (2023–present)

Awards and highlights
- CFP national champion (2025); Big Ten Kicker of the Year (2025); First-team All-Big Ten (2025)
- Stats at ESPN

Nicolas Radicic is an American college football placekicker for the Indiana Hoosiers.

== Early life ==
Radicic was born in California. His family moved to Croatia when he was three years old. He grew up playing soccer. When his family moved back to the United States after his father began working at a job in Texas, Radicic signed a youth contract with Major League Soccer's FC Dallas. He began playing American football as a placekicker in eighth grade. He played both sports in his freshman year at Coppell High School in Coppell, Texas, before quitting soccer to play football full-time. Radicic participated in the Army All-American Bowl. A five-star college football recruit and the third-ranked kicker prospect in the country, he committed to play for the Indiana Hoosiers beginning in the 2023 season.

== College career ==
Radicic played in one game in 2023 before sustaining a season-ending injury that required surgery, successfully kicking two extra points and one field goal with no misses. He took a redshirt for the season.

In 2024, he successfully kicked all 69 extra point attempts and 10 of 11 field goal attempts, with his only miss occurring when he lost his footing in snowy weather in a 66–0 win against the Purdue Boilermakers; his 69 extra points ranked second in the FBS and set an Indiana program record. He earned an All-Big Ten honorable mention for the 2024 season.

Radicic finished the 2025 regular season successfully kicking all 70 extra point attempts and all 13 field goal attempts. He was named the Bakken–Andersen Kicker of the Year, awarded annually to the best kicker in the Big Ten Conference, and also earned first-team All-Big Ten honors. Radicic succeeded on two of two field goal attempts and three of three extra point attempts in Indiana's 27–21 win against the Miami Hurricanes in the 2026 College Football Playoff National Championship.

== Personal life ==
Radicic is a fan of Major League Baseball's San Francisco Giants.
