= Elijah Sarratt =

American football player (born 2003)

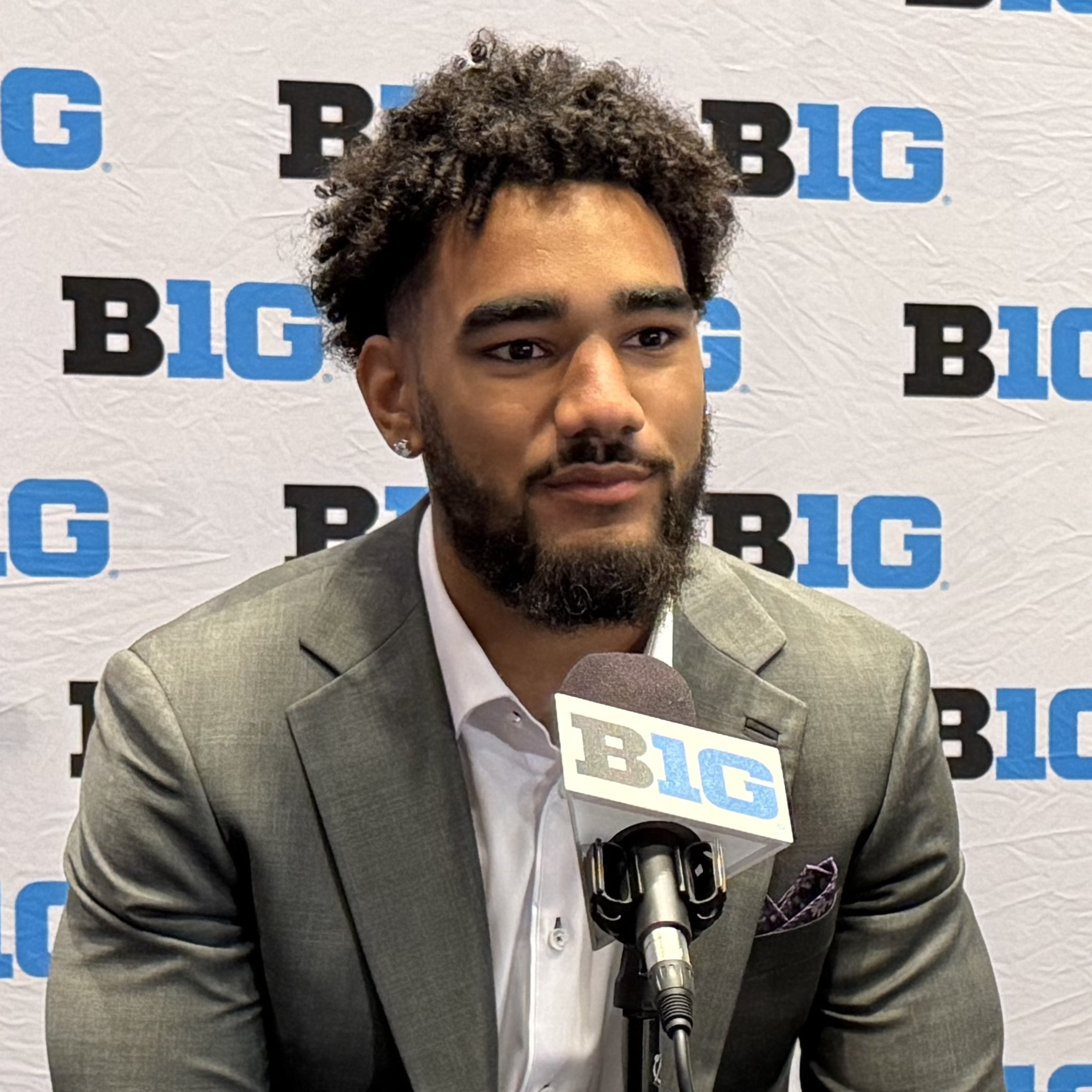
- Sarratt at the 2025 Big Ten Football Media Day

No. 13 – Baltimore Ravens
- Position: Wide receiver
- Roster status: Active

Personal information
- Born: May 28, 2003 (age 23); Stafford, Virginia, U.S.
- Listed height: 6 ft 2 in (1.88 m)
- Listed weight: 215 lb (98 kg)

Career information
- High school: Colonial Forge (Stafford) St. Frances Academy (Baltimore, Maryland)
- College: St. Francis (PA) (2022); James Madison (2023); Indiana (2024–2025)
- NFL draft: 2026: 4th round, 115th overall pick

Career history
- Baltimore Ravens (2026–present)

Awards and highlights
- CFP national champion (2025); NCAA receiving touchdowns leader (2025); First-team All-Sun Belt (2023); First-team All-NEC (2022); Second-team All-Big Ten (2025); Third-team All-Big Ten (2024)

Career NFL statistics as of Week 4, 2026
- Receptions: 1
- Receiving yards: 13
- Stats at Pro Football Reference

Elijah-Makhi Sarratt (born May 28, 2003) is an American professional football wide receiver for the Baltimore Ravens of the National Football League (NFL). He played college football for the Saint Francis Red Flash, James Madison Dukes, and Indiana Hoosiers, winning the 2026 National Championship with the Hoosiers. Sarratt was selected by the Ravens in the fourth round of the 2026 NFL draft.

== Early life ==
Sarratt attended Saint Frances Academy in Baltimore, Maryland. He originally attended Colonial Forge High School before transferring to Saint Frances prior to his senior year. He committed to play college football at Saint Francis University.

== College career ==
=== Saint Francis ===
As a freshman, Sarratt totaled 42 receptions for 700 yards and 13 touchdowns. Following the conclusion of the season, he entered the transfer portal.

=== James Madison ===
Sarratt transferred to James Madison University, emerging as the team's leading receiver. He finished his sophomore campaign recording 82 receptions for 1,191 yards and nine total touchdowns, while being named to the first-team All-Sun Belt. Following the conclusion of the season, Sarratt entered the transfer portal for a second time.

=== Indiana ===
On January 4, 2024, Sarratt announced that he would be transferring to Indiana University Bloomington to play for the Indiana Hoosiers, following his coach, Curt Cignetti. In his first season with the Hoosiers, he recorded 53 receptions for 957 yards and eight touchdowns and was named to the third-team All-Big Ten.

Sarratt returned to Indiana for the 2025 season. He scored three touchdowns in the Hoosiers' 56–9 win against the Kennesaw State Owls. He caught the game-winning touchdown, a 49-yard pass, with 88 seconds left in Indiana's win against the Iowa Hawkeyes. Sarratt caught eight passes for 121 yards and a touchdown in an upset win against the Oregon Ducks. He suffered a hamstring injury early in the game against the Maryland Terrapins and missed the following two games. He was named second-team All-Big Ten for the 2025 season.

=== College statistics ===
Legend
	Led FBS
**Bold**	Career high

Season	Team	GP	Receiving			
Season	Team	GP	Rec	Yds	Avg	TD
2022	Saint Francis	12	42	700	16.7	13
2023	James Madison	13	**82**	**1,191**	14.5	8
2024	Indiana	13	53	957	**18.1**	8
2025	Indiana	14	65	830	12.8	**15**
Career		52	242	3,678	15.2	44

== Professional career ==
Pre-draft measurables
Height	Weight	Arm length	Hand span	Wingspan	40-yard dash	10-yard split	20-yard split	20-yard shuttle	Three-cone drill	Vertical jump	Broad jump	Bench press
6 ft 2 1/2 in (1.89 m)	210 lb (95 kg)	31 1/4 in (0.79 m)	10 in (0.25 m)	6 ft 3 3/4 in (1.92 m)	4.55 s	1.64 s	2.66 s	4.38 s	7.01 s	33.5 in (0.85 m)	10 ft 4 in (3.15 m)	12 reps
All values from NFL Combine/Pro Day

Sarratt was selected by the Baltimore Ravens in the fourth round with the 115th overall pick of the 2026 NFL draft.

== Personal Life ==
Sarratt's nickname is Waffle House, because according to his teammates, he is open 24/7.
