= Nunzio Campanile =

American football coach

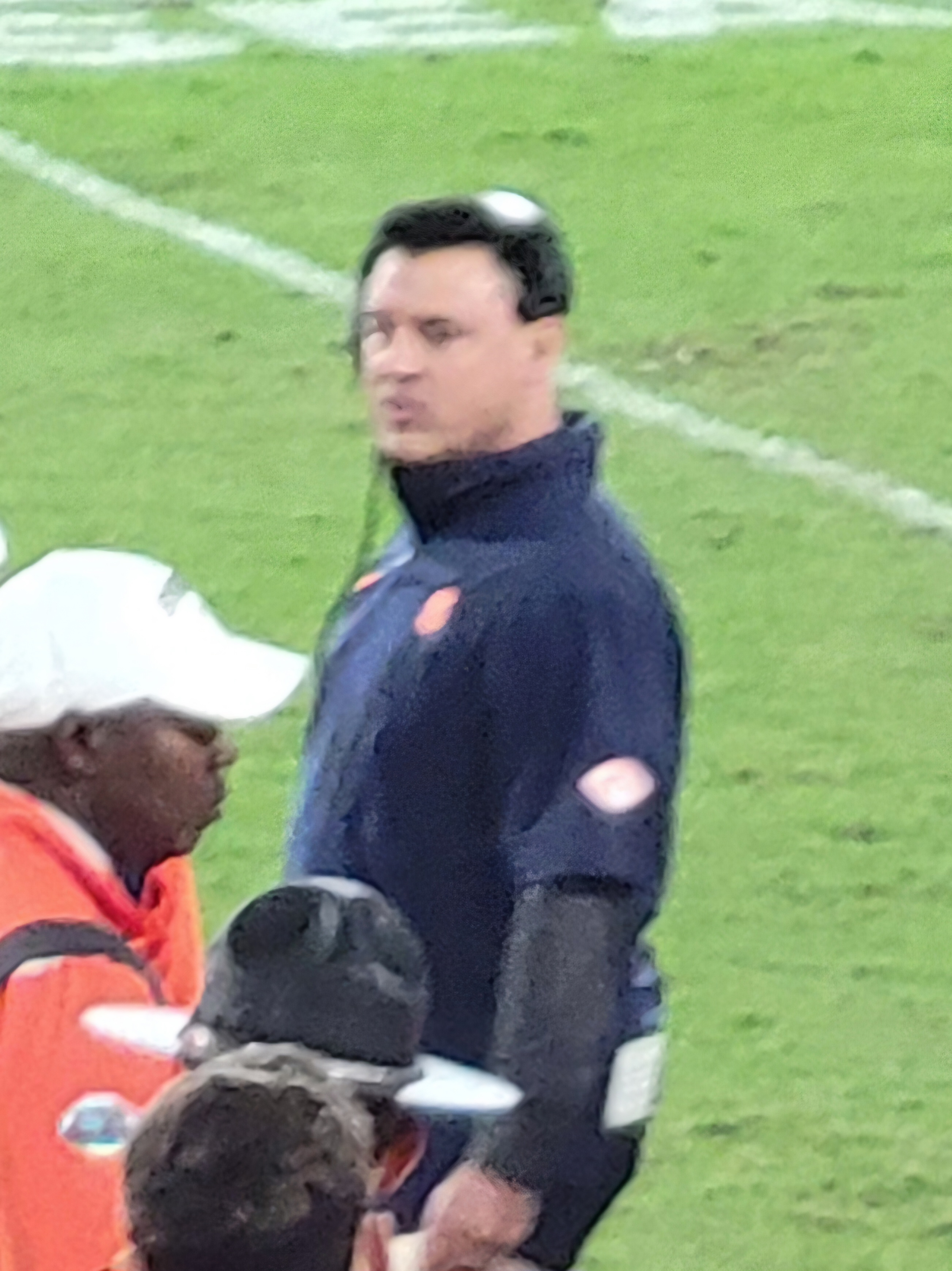

Current position
- Title: Offensive coordinator
- Team: UConn
- Conference: Independent

Biographical details
- Born: Fair Lawn, New Jersey, U.S.
- Education: Montclair State University (1999)

Coaching career (HC unless noted)
- 2000–2009: Don Bosco Prep (NJ) (OC)
- 2010–2017: Bergen Catholic HS (NJ)
- 2018: Rutgers (RB)
- 2019: Rutgers (interim HC/OC/TE)
- 2020–2022: Rutgers (TE)
- 2022: Rutgers (interim OC/QB)
- 2023: Syracuse (interim HC/TE)
- 2024–2025: Syracuse (QB)
- 2026–present: UConn (OC)

Head coaching record
- Overall: 2–8 (college); 60–29 (high school)
- Bowls: 0–1

Nunzio Campanile is an American football coach. He is currently the offensive coordinator for the University of Connecticut Huskies. Campanile served as the interim head coach at Rutgers University for the final eight games of the 2019 season. He was elevated to that position from that of tight ends coach after the firing of head coach Chris Ash and offensive coordinator John McNulty. He also served as the interim head coach at Syracuse in 2023 following the firing of head coach Dino Babers, then remained on the Orange staff after Fran Brown was hired.

== Coaching career ==
=== High school ===
Campanile spent the eight years as the head coach at Bergen Catholic, including winning a state title in 2017 against St. Peter's Preparatory School in a 44–7 win, after working as offensive coordinator at Don Bosco Prep from 2000 to 2009.

=== Rutgers ===
In 2018 Nunzio joined the Rutgers staff after leaving high school football, and is the team's tight ends coach. The following year he began the season as the team's tight ends coach, however he also served as the interim head coach and offensive coordinator for the final eight games of the 2019 season. In 2020 with the hiring of Greg Schiano, Nunzio was the only holdover from the previous staff and returned to be the team's tight ends coach. On October 9, 2022, following the dismissal of Sean Gleeson, Scarlet Knights' offensive coordinator, Nunzio was named interim offensive coordinator and quarterbacks coach.

=== Syracuse ===
On January 23, 2023, Campanile was hired to serve as tight ends coach at Syracuse University. After head coach Dino Babers was fired on November 19, Campanile was named the interim head coach for the remainder of the season.

== Personal life ==
Campanile grew up in Fair Lawn, New Jersey in an Italian-American family full of football coaches. Growing up he watched his father, Mike, coach at Paramus Catholic High School in New Jersey for 10 years. Nunzio's brother Vito is the head coach at Bergen Catholic High School. His brother Anthony is the Jacksonville Jaguars defensive coordinator, while his other brother Nicky is the head coach at DePaul Catholic High School.

== Head coaching record ==
=== College ===
Year	Team	Overall	Conference	Standing	Bowl/playoffs
Rutgers Scarlet Knights (Big Ten Conference) (2019)
2019	Rutgers	1–7	0–7	7th (East)	
Rutgers:		1–7	0–7		
Syracuse Orange (Atlantic Coast Conference) (2023)
2023	Syracuse	1–1 (Note: Campanile replaced Dino Babers with one regular season game remaining)	1–0	T–11th	L Boca Raton
Syracuse:		1–1	1–0		
Total:		2–8			

=== High school ===
Year	Team	Overall	Conference	Standing	Bowl/playoffs
Bergen Catholic Crusaders () (2010–2017)
2010	Bergen Catholic	10–2	2–1	2nd	
2011	Bergen Catholic	8–3	2–1	2nd	
2012	Bergen Catholic	8–4	2–2	4th	
2013	Bergen Catholic	2–7	0–4	5th	
2014	Bergen Catholic	8–3	3–1	3rd	
2015	Bergen Catholic	7–4	3–1	1st	
2016	Bergen Catholic	7–4	1–3	5th	
2017	Bergen Catholic	10–2	4–0	1st	
Bergen Catholic:		60–29	17–13		
Total:		60–29			
National championship Conference title Conference division title or championship game berth
