= 2023 Syracuse Orange football team =

American college football season

2023 Syracuse Orange football

Boca Raton Bowl, L 0–45 vs. South Florida
- Conference: Atlantic Coast Conference
- Atlantic Division
- Record: 6–7 (2–6 ACC)
- Head coach: Dino Babers (8th season; first 11 games); Nunzio Campanile (interim; remainder of season)
- Offensive coordinator: Jason Beck (1st season)
- Offensive scheme: Veer and shoot
- Defensive coordinator: Rocky Long (1st season)
- Base defense: 3–3–5
- Home stadium: JMA Wireless Dome

Uniform
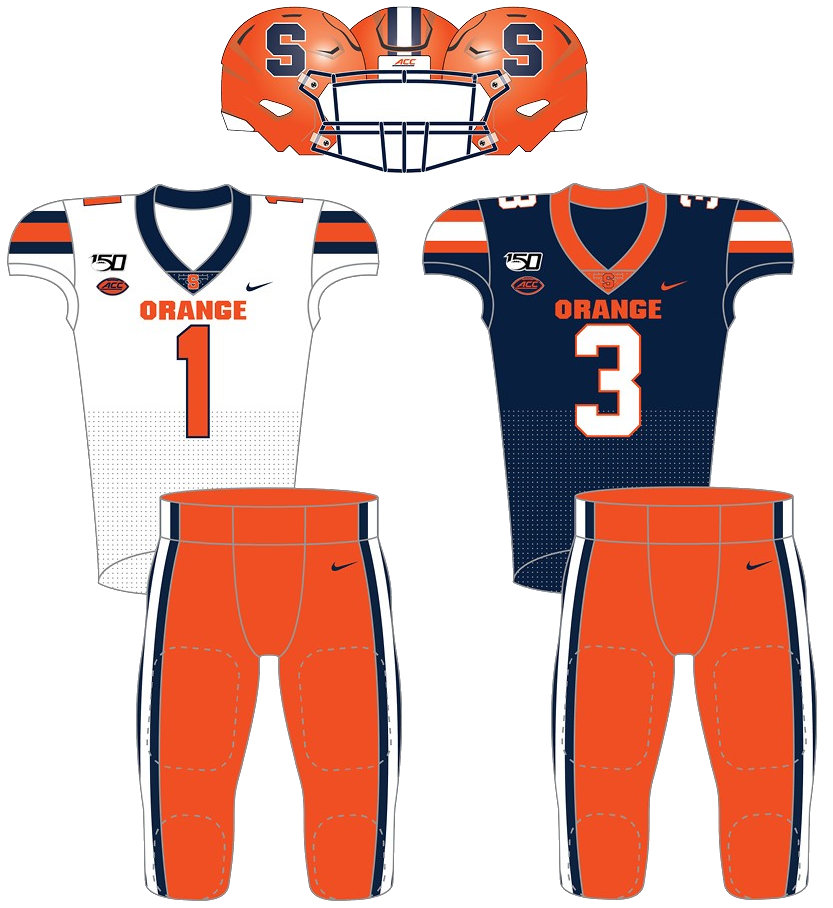

2023 Atlantic Coast Conference football standings
	Conf.			Overall
Team	W		L	W		L
No. 6 Florida State y$	8	–	0	13	–	1
No. 19 Louisville y	7	–	1	10	–	4
No. 21 NC State	6	–	2	9	–	4
Georgia Tech	5	–	3	7	–	6
Virginia Tech	5	–	3	7	–	6
No. 20 Clemson	4	–	4	9	–	4
Duke	4	–	4	8	–	5
North Carolina	4	–	4	8	–	5
Boston College	3	–	5	7	–	6
Miami (FL)	3	–	5	7	–	6
Syracuse	2	–	6	6	–	7
Pittsburgh	2	–	6	3	–	9
Virginia	2	–	6	3	–	9
Wake Forest	1	–	7	4	–	8
Championship: Florida State 16, Louisville 6
$ – Conference champion; y – Championship game participant; Rankings from AP Poll

The 2023 Syracuse Orange football team represented Syracuse University during the 2023 NCAA Division I FBS football season. The Orange played their home games at the JMA Wireless Dome, competing as members of the Atlantic Coast Conference. They were led by eighth-year head coach Dino Babers before his firing on November 19, 2023. Tight ends' coach Nunzio Campanile served as the interim head coach for the remainder of the season. The Syracuse Orange football team drew an average home attendance of 34,045 in 2023.

== Schedule ==
Syracuse and the ACC announced the 2023 football schedule on January 30, 2023. The 2023 season will be the conference's first season since 2004, that its scheduling format just includes one division. The new format sets Syracuse with three set conference opponents, while playing the remaining ten teams twice (home and away) in a four–year cycle. The Orange three set conference opponents for the next four years are; Boston College, Florida State, and Pittsburgh.

Date	Time	Opponent	Site	TV	Result	Attendance
September 2	4:00 p.m.	Colgate*	JMA Wireless Dome; Syracuse, NY (rivalry)	ACCNX/ESPN+	W 65–0	32,465
September 9	3:30 p.m.	Western Michigan*	JMA Wireless Dome; Syracuse, NY	ACCNX/ESPN+	W 48–7	32,637
September 16	7:30 p.m.	at Purdue*	Ross-Ade Stadium; West Lafayette, IN	NBC	W 35–20	61,441
September 23	12:00 p.m.	Army*	JMA Wireless Dome; Syracuse, NY	ACCN	W 29–16	37,594
September 30	12:00 p.m.	Clemson^{†}	JMA Wireless Dome; Syracuse, NY	ABC	L 14–31	40,973
October 7	3:30 p.m.	at No. 14 North Carolina	Kenan Memorial Stadium; Chapel Hill, NC	ESPN	L 7–40	50,500
October 14	12:00 p.m.	at No. 4 Florida State	Doak Campbell Stadium; Tallahassee, FL	ABC	L 3–41	79,560
October 26	7:30 p.m.	at Virginia Tech	Lane Stadium; Blacksburg, VA	ESPN	L 10–38	60,236
November 3	7:30 p.m.	Boston College	JMA Wireless Dome; Syracuse, NY	ESPN2	L 10–17	42,523
November 11	3:30 p.m.	vs. Pittsburgh	Yankee Stadium; Bronx, NY (rivalry)	ACCN	W 28–13	17,101
November 18	8:00 p.m.	at Georgia Tech	Bobby Dodd Stadium; Atlanta, GA	ACCN	L 22–31	33,332
November 25	2:00 p.m.	Wake Forest	JMA Wireless Dome; Syracuse, NY	The CW	W 35–31	35,018
December 21	8:00 p.m.	vs. South Florida*	FAU Stadium; Boca Raton, FL (Boca Raton Bowl)	ESPN	L 0–45	20,711
*Non-conference game; ^{†}Homecoming; Rankings from AP Poll (and CFP Rankings, after November 2) - Released prior to game; All times are in Eastern time

== Game summaries ==
=== vs. Colgate ===
Game One – Colgate Raiders (0–0) at Syracuse Orange (0–0)

Quarter	1	2	3	4	Total
Raiders	0	0	0	0	0
Orange	23	14	28	0	65

at JMA Wireless Dome • Syracuse, NY

- Date: Saturday, September 2, 2023
- Game time: 4:00 p.m. EDT
- Game weather: Indoors
- Game attendance: 32,465
- Referee: Adam Savoie
- TV: ACCNX
- Recap, Box score

Game information

First quarter

- (7:18) SU – LeQuint Allen 3-yard run, Brady Denaburg kick (Drive: 4 plays, 38 yards, 01:13; Syracuse 7–0)
- (5:00) SU – Damien Alford 13-yard pass from Garrett Shrader, Brady Denaburg kick (Drive: 3 plays, 42 yards, 00:42; Syracuse 14–0)
- (3:41) SU – Jeremiah Wilson 34-yard interception return (No drive; Syracuse 20–0)
- (0:54) SU – Brady Denaburg 25-yard field goal (7 plays, 35 yards, 02:40; Syracuse 23–0)

Second quarter

- (11:36) SU – Isaiah Jones 44-yard pass from Garrett Shrader, Brady Denaburg kick (Drive: 8 plays, 85 yards, 02:42; Syracuse 30–0)
- (7:13) SU – Oronde Gadsden II 14-yard pass from Garrett Shrader, Brady Denaburg kick (Drive: 2 plays, 20 yards, 00:26; Syracuse 37–0)

Third quarter

- (11:55) SU – Umari Hatcher 4-yard pass from Garrett Shrader, Brady Denaburg kick (Drive: 8 plays, 92 yards, 03:04; Syracuse 44–0)
- (7:48) SU – Isaiah Jones 5-yard pass from Carlos Del Rio-Wilson, Brady Denaburg kick (Drive: 7 plays, 77 yards, 02:07; Syracuse 51–0)
- (7:13) SU – Kendall Long 25-yard pass from Carlos Del Rio-Wilson, Brady Denaburg kick (Drive: 1 play, 25 yards, 00:08; Syracuse 58–0)
- (1:34) SU – Darrell Gill Jr. 18-yard pass from Carlos Del Rio-Wilson, Brady Denaburg kick (Drive: 10 plays, 60 yards, 03:27; Syracuse 65–0)

Statistics	COL	SU
First downs	7	34
Plays–yards	58–106	89–677
Rushes–yards	38–54	52–271
Passing yards	52	406
Passing: comp–att–int	11–20–2	28–37–1
Turnovers		
Time of possession	29:20	30:40

Team	Category	Player	Statistics
Colgate	Passing	Michael Brescia	7/14, 29 yards, 2 INT
Colgate	Rushing	Jaedon Henry	10 carries, 34 yards
Colgate	Receiving	Winston Moore	3 receptions, 19 yards
Syracuse	Passing	Garrett Shrader	18/24, 257 yards, 4 TD, 1 INT
Syracuse	Rushing	LeQuint Allen	16 carries, 107 yards, 1 TD
Syracuse	Receiving	Umari Hatcher	4 receptions, 105 yards, 1 TD

=== vs. Western Michigan ===
Game Two – Western Michigan Broncos (1–0) at Syracuse Orange (1–0)

Quarter	1	2	3	4	Total
Broncos	7	0	0	0	7
Orange	17	28	3	0	48

at JMA Wireless Dome • Syracuse, NY

- Date: Saturday, September 9, 2023
- Game time: 3:30 p.m. EDT
- Game weather: Indoor
- Game attendance: 32,637
- Referee: Jeremy Valentine
- TV: ACCNX

Game information

First Quarter

- (14:30) WMU - Jalen Buckley 74 yd run (Palmer Domschke kick) (Drive: 2 plays, 75 yards, 0:30; WMU 7-0)
- (10:55) SYR - Brady Denaburg 36 yd Field Goal (Drive: 13 plays, 54 yards, 3:28; WMU 7-3)
- (8:55) SYR - LeQuint Allen 1 yd run (Brady Denaburg kick) (Drive: 5 plays, 50 yards, 1:18; SYR 10-7)
- (5:03) SYR - Donovan Brown 86 yd pass from Garrett Shrader (Brady Denaburg kick) (Drive: 1 play, 86 yards, 0:18; SYR 17-7)

Second Quarter

- (14:52) SYR – Garrett Shrader 18 yd run (Brady Denaburg kick) (Drive: 9 plays, 65 yards, 2:53; SYR 24–7)
- (10:28) SYR - LeQuint Allen 1 yd run (Brady Denaburg kick) (Drive: 5 plays, 73 yards, 2:17; SYR 31-7)
- (1:19) SYR - LeQuint Allen 2 yd run (Brady Denaburg kick) (Drive: 14 plays, 99 yards, 3:38; SYR 38-7)
- (0:00) SYR - Jason Simmons Jr. 84 yd Interception (Brady Denaburg kick) (SYR 45-7)

Third Quarter

- (2:43) SYR - Brady Denaburg 33 yd Field Goal (Drive: 9 plays, 33 yards, 3:49; SYR 48-7)

Fourth Quarter

No scoring plays

Statistics	WMU	SYR
First downs	15	26
Total yards	318	496
Rush yards	97	153
Passing yards	221	343
Turnovers	1	0
Time of possession	30:57	29:03

Team	Category	Player	Statistics
Western Michigan	Passing	Jack Salopek	15/22, 110 yards, INT
Western Michigan	Rushing	Jalen Buckley	8 carries, 87 yards, TD
Western Michigan	Receiving	Kenneth Womack	4 receptions, 67 yards
Syracuse	Passing	Garrett Shrader	19/30, 286 yards, TD
Syracuse	Rushing	Juwaun Price	16 carries, 68 yards
Syracuse	Receiving	Donovan Brown	3 receptions, 89 yards, TD

=== at Purdue ===
Game Three – Syracuse Orange (2–0) at Purdue Boilermakers (1–1)

Quarter	1	2	3	4	Total
Orange	7	14	0	14	35
Boilermakers	0	7	7	6	20

at Ross–Ade Stadium • West Lafayette, Indiana

- Date: Saturday, September 16, 2023
- Game time: 7:30 p.m. EDT
- Game weather: Cloudy • Temperature: 71 °F (22 °C) • Wind: SE 6 mph
- Game attendance: 61,441
- Referee: Jeff Flanagan
- TV announcers (NBC): Noah Eagle (play-by-play) & Dustin Fox (analyst) & Lauren Sisler (sideline)
- Recap, Box score

Game information

First quarter

- (3:47) SU – Garrett Shrader 3-yard run, Brady Denaburg kick (Drive: 11 plays, 94 yards, 03:50; Syracuse 7–0)

Second quarter

- (13:44) SU – Garrett Shrader 35-yard run, Brady Denaburg kick (Drive: 6 plays, 64 yards, 01:47; Syracuse 14–0)
- (11:14) PUR – Deion Burks 2-yard pass from Hudson Card, Ben Freehill kick (Drive: 7 plays, 75 yards, 02:30; Syracuse 14–7)
- (2:34) SU – LeQuint Allen 2-yard run, Brady Denaburg kick (Drive: 8 plays, 81 yards, 03:16; Syracuse 21–7)

Third quarter

- (4:28) PUR – Hudson Card 5-yard run, Ben Freehill kick (Drive: 10 plays, 66 yards, 05:02; Syracuse 21–14)

Fourth quarter

- (14:53) SU – Garrett Shrader 1-yard run, Brady Denaburg kick (Drive: 10 plays, 75 yards, 04:35; Syracuse 28–14)
- (8:38) PUR – Tyrone Tracy Jr. 1-yard run (Drive: 14 plays, 75 yards, 06:15; Syracuse 28–20)
- (3:19) SU – Garrett Shrader 28-yard run, Brady Denaburg kick (Drive: 3 plays, 39 yards, 01:37; Syracuse 35–20)

Statistics	SU	PUR
First downs	28	29
Plays–yards	72–455	78–403
Rushes–yards	44–271	32–80
Passing yards	184	323
Passing: comp–att–int	14–28–1	32–46–1
Turnovers		
Time of possession	29:28	30:32

Team	Category	Player	Statistics
Syracuse	Passing	Garrett Shrader	14/28, 184 yards, 1 INT
Syracuse	Rushing	Garrett Shrader	25 carries, 195 yards, 4 TD
Syracuse	Receiving	Damien Alford	4 receptions, 70 yards
Purdue	Passing	Hudson Card	32/46, 323 yards, 1 TD, 1 INT
Purdue	Rushing	Tyrone Tracy Jr.	10 carries, 38 yards, 1 TD
Purdue	Receiving	Abdur-Rahmaan Yaseen	10 receptions, 114 yards

=== vs. Army ===
Game Four – Army Black Knights (2–1) at Syracuse Orange (3–0)

Quarter	1	2	3	4	Total
Black Knights	7	3	0	6	16
Orange	0	3	13	13	29

at JMA Wireless Dome • Syracuse, NY

- Date: Saturday, September 23, 2023
- Game time: 12:00 p.m. EDT
- Game weather: Indoors
- Game attendance: 37,594
- Referee: Tim Hedgepeth
- TV announcers (ACCNX): Chris Cotter (play-by-play), Mark Herzlich (analyst) & Sherree Burruss (sideline)
- Recap, Box score

Game information

First quarter

- (5:35) ARM – Jakobi Buchanan 1-yard run, Cole Talley kick (Drive: 17 plays, 75 yards, 09:25; Army 7–0)

Second quarter

- (13:29) SU – Brady Denaburg 46-yard kick, (Drive: 9 plays, 42 yards, 03:47; Army 7–3)
- (00:29) ARM – Quinn Maretzki 38-yard kick (Drive: 19 plays, 64 yards, 09:20; Army 10–3)

Third quarter

- (7:59) SU – LeQuint Allen 13-yard run, Brady Denaburg kick (Drive: 4 plays, 66 yards, 01:44; Tied 10–10)
- (2:01) SU – Umari Hatcher 13-yard pass from Garrett Shrader (Drive: 10 plays, 91 yards, 03:41; Syracuse 16–10)

Fourth quarter

- (11:36) SU – Brady Denaburg 30-yard kick, (Drive: 9 plays, 47 yards, 04:13; Syracuse 19–10)
- (9:46) SU – Garrett Shrader 21-yard run, Brady Denaburg kick (Drive: 2 plays, 27 yards, 00:31; Syracuse 26–10)
- (6:05) SU – Brady Denaburg 31-yard kick, (Drive: 6 plays, 13 yards, 03:05; Syracuse 29–10)
- (11:36) ARM – Noah Short 80-yard pass from Bryson Daily (Drive: 1 play, 80 yards, 00:11; Syracuse 29–16)

Statistics	ARM	SU
First downs	16	20
Plays–yards	67–270	63–403
Rushes–yards	46–125	37–158
Passing yards	145	245
Passing: comp–att–int	9–21–2	21–26–1
Turnovers	2	1
Time of possession	33:20	26:40

Team	Category	Player	Statistics
Army	Passing	Bryson Daily	9/21, 145 yards, 2 INT
Army	Rushing	Bryson Daily	20 carries, 47 yards
Army	Receiving	Noah Short	6 receptions, 105 yards, 1 TD
Syracuse	Passing	Garrett Shrader	21/26, 245 yards, 1 TD, 1 INT
Syracuse	Rushing	LeQuint Allen	20 carries, 104 yards, 1 TD
Syracuse	Receiving	Damien Alford	9 receptions, 135 yards

=== vs. Clemson ===
Game Five – Clemson Tigers (2–2) at Syracuse Orange (4–0)

Quarter	1	2	3	4	Total
Tigers	14	7	3	7	31
Orange	7	0	0	7	14

at JMA Wireless Dome • Syracuse, NY

- Date: Saturday, September 30, 2023
- Game time: 12:00 p.m. EDT
- Game weather: Indoors
- Game attendance: 40,974
- Referee: Stuart Mullins
- TV announcers (ABC): Dave Pasch (play-by-play), Dusty Dvoracek (analyst) & Tom Luginbill (sideline)
- Recap, Box score

Game information

First quarter

- (10:03) CLEM – Tony Stellato 14 yard pass from Cade Klubnik, Jonathan Weitz kick, (Drive: 7 plays, 55 yards, 3:14; Clemson 7–0)
- (5:53) CLEM – Will Shipley 2 yard rush, Jonathan Weitz kick, (Drive: 2 plays, 3 yards, 0:42; Clemson 14–0)
- (2:26) SU – Dan Villari 28 yard pass from Garrett Shrader, Brady Denaburg kick, (Drive: 8 plays, 75 yards, 3:27; Clemson 14–7)

Second quarter

- (2:23) CLEM – Beaux Collins 47 yard pass from Cade Klubnik, Jonathan Weitz kick, (Drive: 4 plays, 61 yards, 1:02; Clemson 21–7)

Third quarter

- (11:03) CLEM – Jonathan Weitz 38 yard field goal, (Drive: 7 plays, 51 yards, 3:57; Clemson 24–7)

Fourth quarter

- (12:23) SU – LeQuint Allen 6 yard pass from Garrett Shrader, Brady Denaburg kick, (Drive: 5 plays, 42 yards, 1:42; Clemson 24–14)
- (6:38) CLEM – Phil Mafah 32 yard rush, Jonathan Weitz kick, (Drive: 1 plays, 32 yards, 0:07; Clemson 31–14)

Statistics	CLEM	SU
First downs	22	14
Plays–yards	389	281
Rushes–yards	126	100
Passing yards	263	181
Passing: comp–att–int	23-37-0	16-31-1
Turnovers		
Time of possession	33:21	26:39

Team	Category	Player	Statistics
Clemson	Passing	Cade Klubnik	23–37, 263 yards, 2 TD
Clemson	Rushing	Will Shipley	18 rushes, 61 yards, 1 TD
Clemson	Receiving	Tyler Brown	9 receptions, 153 yards
Syracuse	Passing	Garrett Shrader	15–29, 181 yards, 2 TD, 1 INT
Syracuse	Rushing	LeQuint Allen	14 rushes, 52 yards
Syracuse	Receiving	Dan Villari	2 receptions, 65 yards, 1 TD

=== at No. 14 North Carolina ===
Game Five – Syracuse Orange (4–1) at No. 14 North Carolina Tar Heels (4–0)

Quarter	1	2	3	4	Total
Orange	0	0	7	0	7
No. 14 Tar Heels	10	17	10	3	40

at Kenan Memorial Stadium • Chapel Hill, NC

- Date: Saturday, October 7, 2023
- Game time: 3:30 p.m. EDT
- Game weather: Sunny • Temperature: 71 °F (22 °C) • Wind: NW 15 mph
- Game attendance: 50,500
- Referee: Marcus Woods
- TV announcers (ESPN): Dave Pasch (play-by-play), Dusty Dvoracek (analyst) & Tom Luginbill (sideline)
- Recap, Box score

Game information

First quarter

- (10:51) UNC – Noah Burnette 29-yard field goal (Drive: 14 plays, 64 yards, 4:09; North Carolina 3–0)
- (1:33) UNC – Drake Maye 1-yard rush, Noah Burnette kick (Drive: 17 plays, 94 yards, 7:27; North Carolina 10–0)

Second quarter

- (12:36) UNC – Bryson Nesbit 23-yard pass from Drake Maye, Noah Burnette kick (Drive: 9 plays, 77 yards, 2:25; North Carolina 17–0)
- (6:10) UNC – John Copenhaver 1-yard pass from Drake Maye, Noah Burnette kick (Drive: 9 plays, 95 yards, 3:13; North Carolina 24–0)
- (0:07) UNC – Noah Burnette 24-yard field goal (Drive: 12 plays, 72 yards, 3:25; North Carolina 27–0)

Third quarter

- (11:15) SYR – LeQuint Allen 1-yard rush, Brady Denaburg kick (Drive: (9 plays, 75 yards, 3:45; North Carolina 27–7)
- (6:46) UNC – Noah Burnette 36-yard field goal (Drive: 10 plays, 57 yards, 4:29; North Carolina 30–7)
- (1:41) UNC – Kobe Paysour 77-yard pass from Drake Maye, Noah Burnette kick (Drive: 4 plays, 83 yards, 1:24; North Carolina 37–7)

Fourth quarter

- (5:08) UNC – Noah Burnette 31-yard field goal (Drive: 17 plays, 62 yards, 8:09; North Carolina 40–7)

Statistics	SU	UNC
First downs	11	33
Plays–yards	51–221	97–644
Rushes–yards	28–92	48–202
Passing yards	129	442
Passing: comp–att–int	16–23–2	33–49–0
Turnovers		
Time of possession	22:44	37:16

Team	Category	Player	Statistics
SU	Passing	Garrett Shrader	15/21, 124 yards, 1 INT
SU	Rushing	LeQuint Allen	11 carries, 38 yards, 1 TD
SU	Receiving	Umari Hatcher	6 receptions, 85 yards
UNC	Passing	Drake Maye	33/47, 442 yards, 3 TD
UNC	Rushing	Omarion Hampton	15 carries, 78 yards
UNC	Receiving	Nate McCollum	7 receptions, 135 yards

=== at No. 4 Florida State ===
Game Six – Syracuse Orange (4–2) at No. 4 Florida State Seminoles (5–0)

Quarter	1	2	3	4	Total
Orange	0	3	0	0	3
No. 4 Seminoles	7	10	7	17	41

at Doak S. Campbell Stadium • Tallahassee, FL

- Date: Saturday, October 14, 2023
- Game time: 12:00 p.m. EDT
- Game weather: Cloudy • Temperature: 73 °F (23 °C) • Wind: NW 5 mph
- Game attendance: 79,560
- Referee: Gary Patterson
- TV announcers (ABC): Bob Wischusen (play-by-play), Robert Griffin III (analyst) & Kris Budden (sideline)
- Recap, Box score

Game information

First quarter

- (9:05) FSU – Jordan Travis 2-yard run, Ryan Fitzgerald kick (Drive: 9 plays, 80 yards, 4:19; Florida State 7–0)

Second quarter

- (14:55) FSU – Ryan Fitzgerald 48-yard field goal (Drive: 8 plays, 51 yards, 2:49; Florida State 10–0)
- (9:26) SU – Brady Denaburg 37-yard field goal (Drive: 10 plays, 55 yards, 5:29; Florida State 10–3)
- (07:41) FSU – Keon Coleman 58-yard pass from Jordan Travis, Ryan Fitzgerald kick (Drive: 4 plays, 75 yards, 1:45; Florida State 17–3)

Third quarter

- (09:11) FSU – Jordan Travis 2-yard run, Ryan Fitzgerald kick (Drive: 6 plays, 70 yards, 2:12; Florida State 24–3)

Fourth quarter

- (14:06) FSU – Ryan Fitzgerald 29-yard field goal (Drive: 4 plays, –2 yards, 1:16; Florida State 27–3)
- (09:47) FSU – Lawrance Toafili 50-yard run, Ryan Fitzgerald kick (Drive: 6 plays, 80 yards, 2:34; Florida State 34–3)
- (05:57) FSU – Hykeem Williams 44-yard pass from Tate Rodemaker, Ryan Fitzgerald kick (Drive: 4 plays, 71 yards, 2:03; Florida State 41–3)

Statistics	SU	FSU
First downs	12	22
Plays–yards	67–261	73–535
Rushes–yards	36–124	34–191
Passing yards	137	344
Passing: comp–att–int	12–31–1	25–39–0
Turnovers		
Time of possession	32:59	27:01

Team	Category	Player	Statistics
Syracuse	Passing	Garrett Shrader	9/21, 99 yards
Syracuse	Rushing	LeQuint Allen	19 carries, 110 yards
Syracuse	Receiving	Damien Alford	2 receptions, 37 yards
Florida State	Passing	Jordan Travis	23/37, 284 yards, 1 TD
Florida State	Rushing	Lawrance Toafili	7 carries, 93 yards, 1 TD
Florida State	Receiving	Keon Coleman	9 receptions, 140 yards, 1 TD

=== at Virginia Tech ===
Game Seven – Syracuse Orange (4–3) at Virginia Tech Hokies (3–4)

Quarter	1	2	3	4	Total
Orange	0	3	7	0	10
Hokies	13	17	5	3	38

at Lane Stadium • Blacksburg, VA

- Date: Thursday, October 26, 2023
- Game time: 7:30 p.m. EDT
- Game weather: clear • Temperature: 67 °F (19 °C)
- Game attendance: 60,232
- Referee: Riley Johnson
- TV: ESPN
- Recap, Box score

Game information

First Quarter

- (11:22) VT - John Love 43 yd Field Goal (Drive: 7 plays, 25 yards, 2:28; VT 3-0)
- (6:00) VT - Da'Quan Felton 16 yd Pass From Malachi Thomas (John Love Kick) (Drive: 10 plays, 68 yards, 4:16; VT 10-0)
- (1:57) VT - John Love 32 yd Field Goal (Drive: 6 plays, 15 yards, 2:34; VT 13-0)

Second Quarter

- (11:34) VT – John Love 39 yd Field Goal (Drive: 9 plays, 53 yards, 3:56; VT 16–0)
- (7:13) VT - Da'Quan Felton 62 yd Pass From Kyron Drones (John Love Kick) (Drive: 6 plays, 93 yards, 2:27; VT 23-0)
- (4:18) SYR - Brady Denaburg 43 yd Field Goal (Drive: 8 plays, 50 yards, 2:55; VT 23-3)
- (1:34) VT - Bhayshul Tuten 3 yd Rush (John Love Kick) (Drive: 6 plays, 75 yards, 2:44; VT 30-3)

Third Quarter

- (12:57) VT - Garrett Shrader (SYR) Strip Sacked, Fumble through the back of the Endzone for a Safety (VT 32-3)
- (7:41) SYR - Dan Villari 6 yd Pass From Garrett Shrader (Brady Denaburg Kick) (Drive: 9 plays, 80 yards, 3:23; VT 32-10)
- (0:08) VT - John Love 24 yd Field Goal (Drive: 12 plays, 68 yards, 7:33; VT 35-10)

Fourth Quarter

- (7:47) VT - John Love 31 yd Field Goal (Drive: 9 plays, 52 yards, 5:49; VT 38-10)

Statistics	SYR	VT
First downs	9	28
Total yards	137	528
Rush yards	0	318
Passing yards	137	210
Turnovers	0	0
Time of possession	18:18	41:42

Team	Category	Player	Statistics
Syracuse	Passing	Garrett Shrader	12/18, 137 yards, TD
Syracuse	Rushing	LeQuint Allen	14 carries, 42 yards
Syracuse	Receiving	Damien Alford	4 receptions, 70 yards
Virginia Tech	Passing	Kyron Drones	15/24, 194 yards, TD
Virginia Tech	Rushing	Bhayshul Tuten	18 carries, 118 yards, TD
Virginia Tech	Receiving	Da'Quan Felton	3 receptions, 80 yards, 2 TD

=== vs. Boston College ===
Game Eight – Boston College Eagles (5–3) at Syracuse Orange (4–4) – Game summary

Quarter	1	2	3	4	Total
Eagles	3	7	0	7	17
Orange	7	0	0	3	10

at JMA Wireless Dome • Syracuse, NY

- Date: Friday, November 3, 2023
- Game time: 7:30 p.m. EDT
- Game weather: Indoor
- Game attendance: 42,523
- Referee: Stuart Mullins
- TV announcers (ESPN2): Anish Shroff (play-by-play), Andre Ware (analyst), and Paul Carcaterra (sideline)
- Recap, Box score

Game information

First quarter

- (4:55) BC – Liam Connor 24 yd Field Goal (Drive: 10 plays, 44 yards, 4:03; BC 3–0)
- (0:33) SYR - Carlos Del Rio-Wilson 27 yd run (Brady Denaburg Kick) (Drive: 4 plays, 65 yards, 1:43; SYR 7-3)

Second quarter

- (0:48) BC - Owen McGowan 2 yd pass from Thomas Castellanos (Liam Connor Kick) (Drive: 18 plays, 80 yards, 7:59; BC 10-7)

Third quarter

No scoring plays

Fourth quarter

- (14:18) SYR - Brady Denaburg 36 yd Field Goal (Drive: 5 plays, 58 yards, 1:46; TIED 10-10)
- (2:23) BC - Thomas Castellanos 7 yd run (Liam Connor Kick) (Drive: 11 plays, 71 yards, 3:36; BC 17-10)

Statistics	BC	SYR
First downs	27	10
Total yards	350	246
Rush yards	185	209
Passing yards	165	37
Turnovers	2	4
Time of possession	42:16	17:44

Team	Category	Player	Statistics
Boston College	Passing	Thomas Castellanos	20/37, 165 yards, TD
Boston College	Rushing	Thomas Castellanos	22 carries, 87 yards, TD
Boston College	Receiving	Lewis Bond	4 receptions, 48 yards
Syracuse	Passing	Carlos Del Rio-Wilson	7/17, 37 yards, 4 INT
Syracuse	Rushing	LeQuint Allen	18 carries, 142 yards
Syracuse	Receiving	Umari Hatcher	3 receptions, 19 yards

=== vs. Pittsburgh ===
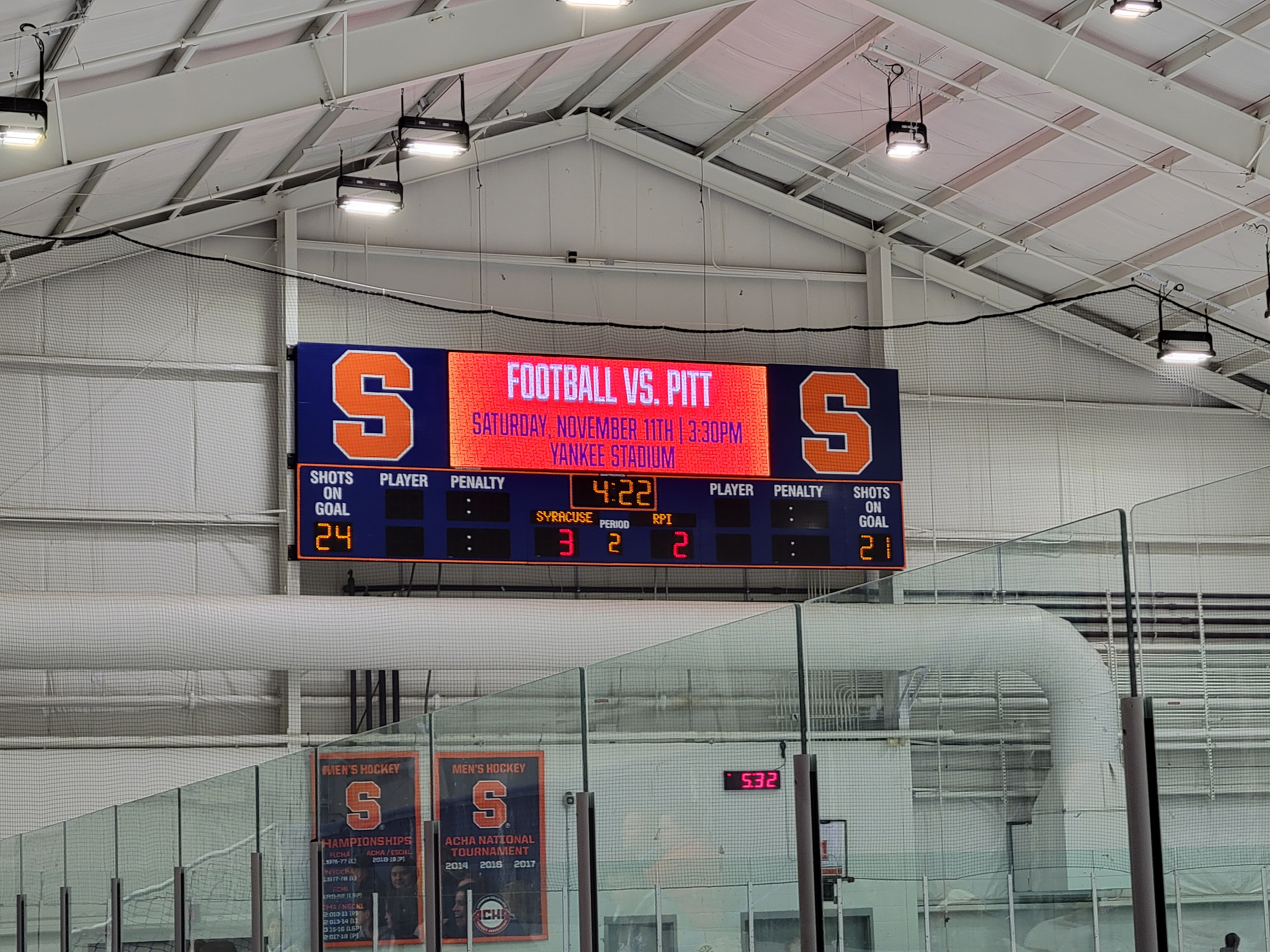
Syracuse vs. Pitt football advert at the Tennity Ice Skating Pavilion, Syracuse University.

	1	2	3	4	Total
Panthers	3	10	0	0	13
Orange	7	0	14	7	28

=== at Georgia Tech ===
	1	2	3	4	Total
Orange	3	0	13	6	22
Yellow Jackets	7	10	7	7	31

=== vs. Wake Forest ===
	1	2	3	4	Total
Demon Deacons	7	3	7	14	31
Orange	7	7	7	14	35

=== vs. South Florida (Boca Raton Bowl) ===
	1	2	3	4	Total
Bulls	14	17	7	7	45
Orange	0	0	0	0	0

== Personnel ==
=== Coaching staff ===
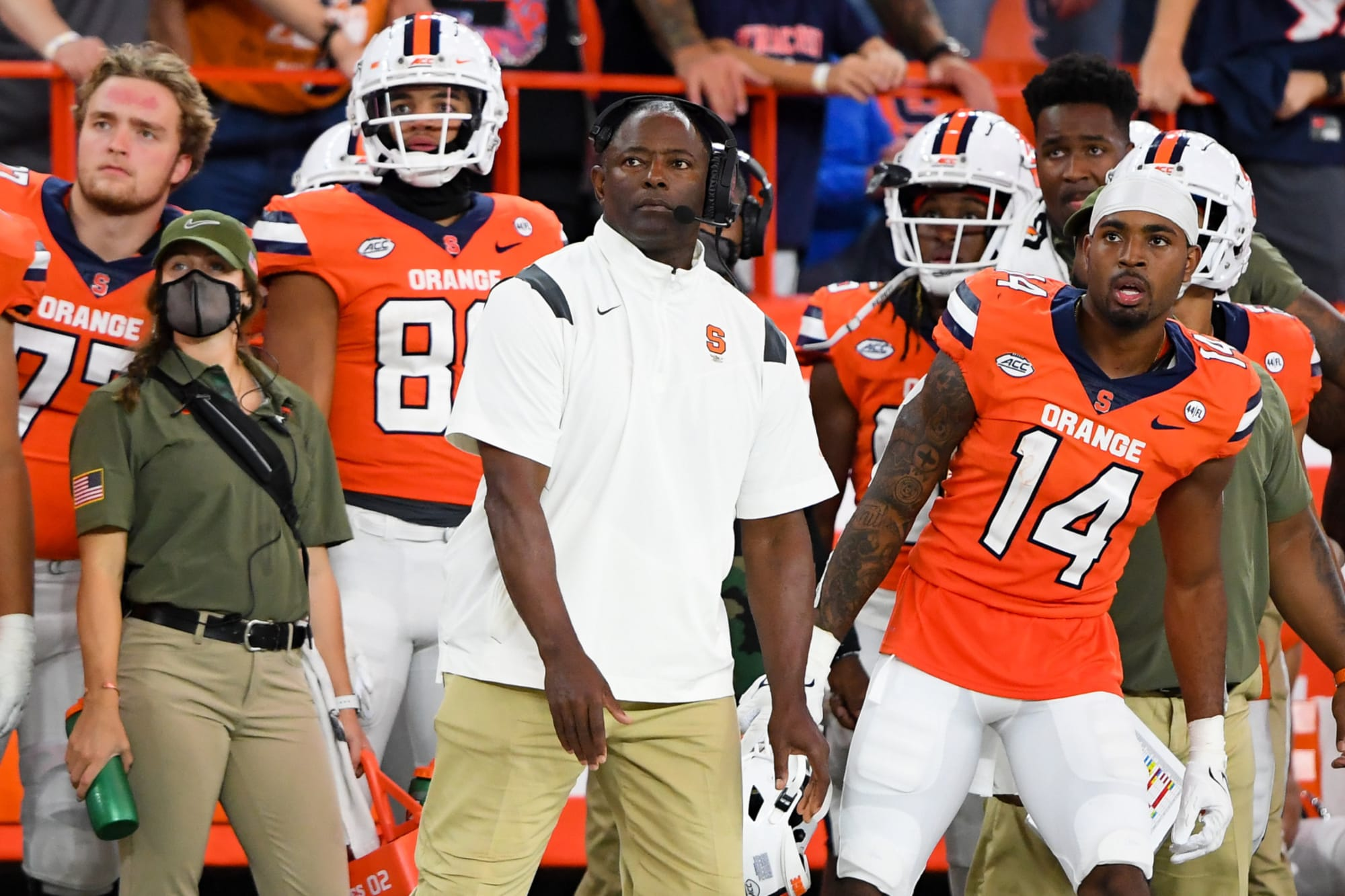
Head Coach Dino Babers with players.

Syracuse Orange football current coaching staff
Name	Position	Years at Syracuse
Dino Babers	Head coach	8th
Rocky Long	Defensive coordinator	1st
Jason Beck	Offensive coordinator	3rd
Chris Achuff	Defensive line coach	4th
Bob Ligashesky	Special teams coordinator	2nd
Mike Lynch	Running backs coach	8th
Steve Farmer	Offensive line coach	1st
Travis Fisher	Cornerbacks coach	1st
Michael Johnson	Outside Receivers	2nd
Nunzio Campanile	Tight ends coach	1st
