= 2019 Rutgers Scarlet Knights football team =

American college football season

2019 Rutgers Scarlet Knights football
- Conference: Big Ten Conference
- East Division
- Record: 2–10 (0–9 Big Ten)
- Head coach: Chris Ash (4th season; first 4 games); Nunzio Campanile (interim; remainder of season)
- Offensive coordinator: John McNulty (2nd season; first 4 games); Nunzio Campanile (interim; remainder of season)
- Offensive scheme: Power spread
- Defensive coordinator: Andy Buh (1st season)
- Co-defensive coordinator: Noah Joseph (2nd season)
- Base defense: Multiple
- Home stadium: SHI Stadium

Uniform
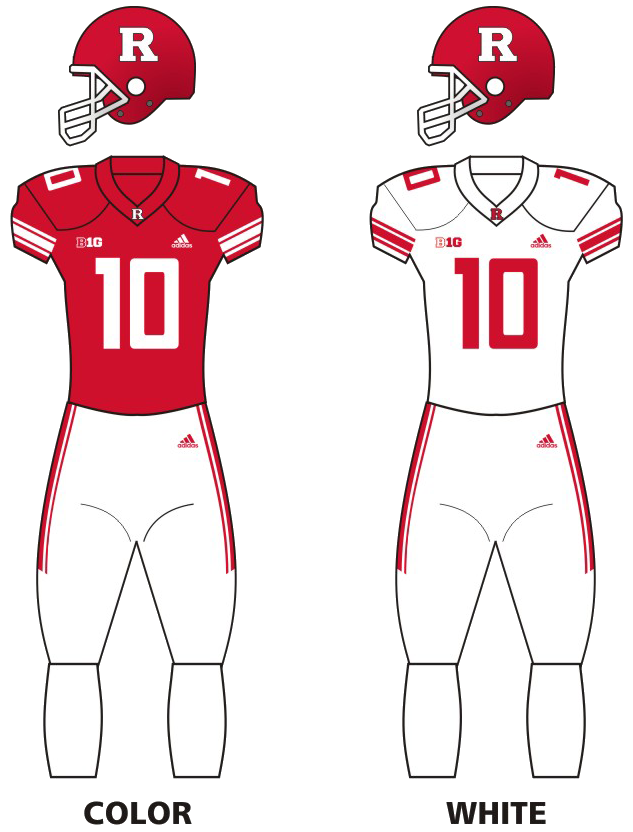

2019 Big Ten Conference football standings
	Conf.			Overall
Team	W		L	W		L
East Division
No. 3 Ohio State xy$^	9	–	0	13	–	1
No. 9 Penn State	7	–	2	11	–	2
No. 18 Michigan	6	–	3	9	–	4
Indiana	5	–	4	8	–	5
Michigan State	4	–	5	7	–	6
Maryland	1	–	8	3	–	9
Rutgers	0	–	9	2	–	10
West Division
No. 11 Wisconsin xy	7	–	2	10	–	4
No. 10 Minnesota x	7	–	2	11	–	2
No. 15 Iowa	6	–	3	10	–	3
Illinois	4	–	5	6	–	7
Purdue	3	–	6	4	–	8
Nebraska	3	–	6	5	–	7
Northwestern	1	–	8	3	–	9
Championship: Ohio State 34, Wisconsin 21
^ – College Football Playoff participant; $ – Conference champion; x – Division champion/co-champions; y – Championship game participant; Rankings from AP Poll

The 2019 Rutgers Scarlet Knights football team represented Rutgers University during the 2019 NCAA Division I FBS football season. The Scarlet Knights played their home games at SHI Stadium in Piscataway, New Jersey and competed as members of the East Division of the Big Ten Conference. They were led by fourth-year head coach Chris Ash. On September 29, 2019, Ash was fired after 3 1/3 seasons as head coach. He posted an overall record of 8–32 and 3–26 in Big Ten play. Nunzio Campanile was their interim head coach for the remainder of the season. They finished the season 2–10, 0–9 in Big Ten play to finish in last place in the East Division.

== Offseason ==
Andy Buh was hired as defensive coordinator on January 21, 2019. He had previously served in the same position for three years at Maryland. Henry Baker, who served as cornerbacks coach for Rutgers in 2017 but coached at North Carolina in 2018, was hired back as cornerbacks coach and passing game coordinator.

== Preseason ==
=== Preseason Big Ten poll ===
Although the Big Ten Conference has not held an official preseason poll since 2010, Cleveland.com has polled sports journalists representing all member schools as a de facto preseason media poll since 2011. For the 2019 poll, Rutgers was projected to finish in last in the East Division.

== Schedule ==
Rutgers' 2019 schedule began on August 30 with a non-conference game against UMass, a football independent. The Scarlet Knights' other non-conference games were against Boston College of the Atlantic Coast Conference and Liberty, also an independent at the time. In Big Ten Conference play, Rutgers played all members of the East Division as well as Iowa, Minnesota, and Illinois from the West Division.

Date	Time	Opponent	Site	TV	Result	Attendance
August 30	7:15 p.m.	UMass*	SHI Stadium; Piscataway, NJ	BTN	W 48–21	40,515
September 7	12:00 p.m.	at No. 20 Iowa	Kinnick Stadium; Iowa City, IA	FS1	L 0–30	61,808
September 21	12:00 p.m.	Boston College*	SHI Stadium; Piscataway, NJ	BTN	L 16–30	32,217
September 28	12:00 p.m.	at No. 20 Michigan	Michigan Stadium; Ann Arbor, MI	BTN	L 0–52	110,662
October 5	12:00 p.m.	Maryland	SHI Stadium; Piscataway, NJ	BTN	L 7–48	30,185
October 12	12:00 p.m.	at Indiana	Memorial Stadium; Bloomington, IN	BTN	L 0–35	37,055
October 19	3:30 p.m.	No. 20 Minnesota^{†}	SHI Stadium; Piscataway, NJ	BTN	L 7–42	26,429
October 26	12:00 p.m.	Liberty*	SHI Stadium; Piscataway, NJ	BTN	W 44–34	23,058
November 2	3:30 p.m.	at Illinois	Memorial Stadium; Champaign, IL	BTN	L 10–38	35,632
November 16	3:30 p.m.	No. 2 Ohio State	SHI Stadium; Piscataway, NJ	BTN	L 21–56	33,528
November 23	12:00 p.m.	Michigan State	SHI Stadium; Piscataway, NJ	FS1	L 0–27	24,641
November 30	3:30 p.m.	at No. 10 Penn State	Beaver Stadium; University Park, PA	BTN	L 6–27	98,895
*Non-conference game; ^{†}Homecoming; Rankings from AP Poll and CFP Rankings (after November 5) released prior to game; All times are in Eastern time

== Game summaries ==
=== UMass ===
	1	2	3	4	Total
Minutemen	21	0	0	0	21
Scarlet Knights	7	31	3	7	48

=== At Iowa ===
	1	2	3	4	Total
Scarlet Knights	0	0	0	0	0
No. 20 Hawkeyes	7	13	7	3	30

=== Boston College ===
	1	2	3	4	Total
Eagles	7	10	7	6	30
Scarlet Knights	7	6	0	3	16

=== At Michigan ===
	1	2	3	4	Total
Scarlet Knights	0	0	0	0	0
No. 20 Wolverines	14	10	14	14	52

=== Maryland ===
	1	2	3	4	Total
Terrapins	7	20	21	0	48
Scarlet Knights	0	7	0	0	7

=== At Indiana ===
	1	2	3	4	Total
Scarlet Knights	0	0	0	0	0
Hoosiers	21	0	14	0	35

=== Minnesota ===
	1	2	3	4	Total
No. 20 Golden Gophers	7	7	7	21	42
Scarlet Knights	0	0	0	7	7

=== Liberty ===
	1	2	3	4	Total
Flames	14	7	3	10	34
Scarlet Knights	7	14	17	6	44

=== At Illinois ===
	1	2	3	4	Total
Scarlet Knights	0	10	0	0	10
Fighting Illini	10	0	21	7	38

=== Ohio State ===
	1	2	3	4	Total
No. 2 Buckeyes	21	14	14	7	56
Scarlet Knights	7	0	7	7	21

=== Michigan State ===
	1	2	3	4	Total
Spartans	10	7	3	7	27
Scarlet Knights	0	0	0	0	0

=== At Penn State ===
	1	2	3	4	Total
Scarlet Knights	3	0	0	3	6
No. 10 Nittany Lions	7	0	6	14	27

== Roster and Coaches ==
2019 Rutgers Scarlet Knights football team roster
Players
Coaches
Offense

Pos.	#	Name	Class
RB	1	Isiah Pacheco	So
RB	2	Raheem Blackshear	Jr
QB	3	McLane Carter	Sr
RB	4	Aaron Young	Fr
WR	5	Paul Woods	Fr
WR	6	Mohamed Jabbie	Jr
WR	7	Hunter Hayek	Jr
QB	8	Artur Sitkowski	So
WR	9	Tyler Hayek	So
TE	10	Matt Alaimo	Fr
TE	11	Johnathan Lewis	So
WR	12	Jalen Jordan	Fr
WR	13	Prince Taylor	Jr
WR	14	Everett Wormley	Jr
WR	15	Shameen Jones	So
QB	16	Cole Snyder	Fr
QB	17	Johnny Langan	Fr
WR	18	Bo Melton	Jr
QB	19	Austin Albericci	Fr
RB	20	Elijah Barnwell	So
WR	21	Eddie Lewis	So
RB	22	Kay'Ron Adams	Fr
RB	33	Parker Day	So
TE	35	Jonathan Pimentel	Fr
RB	40	Joseph Hayford	Jr
TE	42	Jake Malaney	Fr
TE	45	Brandon Myers	Fr
TE	48	Ryan Cassidy	So
TE	49	Kyle Penniston	Sr
OL	50	Owen Bowles	So
OL	51	Jamaal Beaty	So
OL	54	Kamaal Seymour	Sr
OL	55	Michael Maietti	Jr
OL	57	Zach Miseo	So
OL	59	C. J. Hanson	Fr
OL	60	Omari Cooper	Jr
OL	61	Mike Lonsdorf	Jr
OL	63	Jim Onulak	Jr
OL	64	Jason Lavigna	Fr
OL	66	Nick Krimin	Jr
OL	70	Reggie Sutton	Fr
OL	71	Raiqwon O'Neal	Fr
OL	72	Manny Taylor	Sr
OL	74	Sam Howson	Jr
OL	75	Zach Venesky	Sr
OL	76	Matt Rosso	Fr
OL	77	Sam Vretman	Jr
OL	78	Liam Flite	Fr
OL	79	Anton Oskarsson	Fr
WR	80	Monterio Hunt	Jr
WR	81	Rich McDonald	So
WR	82	Christian Dremel	Fr
WR	83	Isaiah Washington	Fr
WR	84	Cole Murphy	Sr
WR	85	Daevon Robinson	So
TE	86	Cooper Heisey	Fr
WR	87	John Guaimano	Fr
WR	88	Stanley King	Fr

Defense

Pos.	#	Name	Class
DB	2	Avery Young	So
LB	3	Olakunle Fatukasi	Jr
DB	4	Tim Barrow	So
DB	5	Kessawn Abraham	So
LB	6	Rashawn Battle	Jr
DL	7	Elorm Lumor	Jr
LB	8	Tyshon Fogg	Jr
LB	9	Tyreek Maddox-Williams	Jr
LB	10	Zukudo Igwenagu	Fr
LB	11	Drew Singleton	So
DB	12	Christian Izien	Fr
DB	13	Amir Byrd	Fr
DB	14	Jameer Campbell	Jr
WR	15	Malik Dixon	Sr
LB	17	Deion Jennings	Fr
DB	17	Zamir Mickens	Fr
DB	19	Calebe Silva	So
DB	21	Tre Avery	Jr
DB	22	Damon Hayes	Sr
DB	23	Donald Williams	Fr
DB	24	Naijee Jones	So
DB	25	Jarrett Paul	So
LB	26	C. J. Onyechi	So
DB	27	Kobe Marfo	Sr
LB	28	Aslan Pugh	Jr
DB	29	Lawrence Stevens	Jr
DB	30	Chris Conti	Fr
LB	31	Johnny Yorey	Fr
DB	32	Rani Abdulaziz	So
DB	33	Kyle LaPorte	Sr
DB	35	Anthony Marshall	Fr
DB	36	Darius Gooden	Fr
DB	37	T. J. Robinson	Fr
LB	40	Nihym Anderson	Fr
LB	41	Jack Quander	Fr
LB	43	Chike Nwankwo	Fr
LB	44	Brian Ugwu	Fr
DL	45	Jamree Kromah	Fr
LB	46	Matt Gibney	Fr
DL	50	Julius Turner	Jr
LB	55	Austin Rosa	Sr
DL	56	Micah Clark	So
DL	57	Jaohne Duggan	So
DL	58	Mohamed Toure	Fr
DL	59	Drew Bethke	Fr
DL	85	Matt Thomas	Fr
DL	88	Brendan Bordner	So
DL	90	Freddie Recio	Jr
DL	91	Tijaun Mason	So
DL	93	Jason Griggs	Jr
DL	95	Devin Baldwin	Fr
DL	96	Willington Previlon	Sr
DL	97	Mike Tverdov	So
DL	98	Robin Jutwreten	Fr
DL	99	Malachi Burby	Fr

Special teams

Pos.	#	Name	Class
P	16	Zach Feagles	Jr
LS	46	Brendan Shank	Jr
LS	47	Billy Taylor	Jr
LS	56	Donato Crisanti	Fr
LS	62	Matthew Sportelli	Jr
P	91	David Broncati	Fr
P	94	Adam Korsak	Jr
K	95	Justin Davidovicz	Jr
K	96	Guy Fava	Fr

Head coach

- Chris Ash

Coordinators/assistant coaches

- Andy Buh (Defensive coordinator/linebackers)
- John McNulty (Offensive coordinator/quarterbacks)
- Vince Okruch(Special teams coordinator/outside linebackers)
- Noah Joseph (Co-defensive coordinator/safeties)
- Corey Brown (Defensive line)
- Nunzio Campanile (Tight ends)
- Lester Erb (Wide receivers)
- Peter Rossomando (Offensive line)
- Kolby Smith (Running backs)
- Jay Valai (Cornerbacks)
- Kenny Parker (Head Strength and Conditioning)
- Andrew DiRienzo (Offensive assistant)
- Ross Douglas (Defensive Assistant)
- Myles Nash (Defensive Assistant)
- John Weiss (Offensive assistant)

Legend

- (C) Team captain
- (S) Suspended
- (I) Ineligible
- Injured
- Redshirt

Roster
Last update: September 20, 2019
