= Garrett Shrader =

American gridiron football player (born 2000)

Profile
- Position: Quarterback

Personal information
- Born: August 5, 2000 (age 26); Charlotte, North Carolina, U.S.
- Listed height: 6 ft 4 in (1.93 m)
- Listed weight: 228 lb (103 kg)

Career information
- High school: Charlotte Christian School
- College: Mississippi State (2019–2020); Syracuse (2021–2023)
- NFL draft: 2024: undrafted

Career history
- BC Lions (2025)*
- * Offseason or practice squad member only
- Stats at CFL.ca

Garrett Michael Shrader (born August 5, 2000) is an American professional football quarterback who is currently a free agent. He played college football for the Mississippi State Bulldogs before transferring to the Syracuse Orange after two years.

== Early life ==
Shrader attended Charlotte Christian School in Charlotte, North Carolina. During his career he had 9,023 total yards (6,818 passing, 2,205 rushing) and 107 total touchdowns (75 passing, 32 rushing). He committed to Mississippi State University to play college football.

== College career ==
Shrader appeared in 10 games and made four starts his true freshman year at Mississippi State in 2019. He made his first career start against Kentucky, passing for 180 yards and rushing for 125. Overall that season, he completed 88 of 153 passes for 1,170 yards, eight touchdowns and five interceptions and added 587 rushing yards and six touchdowns. Shrader played in four games his sophomore year in 2020 without attempting a pass.

After the 2020 season, Shrader transferred to Syracuse University. He entered his first year at Syracuse as the backup to Tommy DeVito, but took over as the starter for the team's fourth game of the season and remained the starter for the final nine games. For the season, he completed 123 of 234 passes for 1,445 yards, nine touchdowns and four interceptions and rushed for 781 yards on 173 carries with 14 touchdowns.

Shrader returned to Syracuse as the team's starter the next two years, helping lead the Orange to two consecutive bowl game appearances despite several injuries. Against Purdue on national television in September 2023, Shrader rushed for 195 yards and 4 touchdowns, breaking Syracuse's school record for most rushing touchdowns by a quarterback, while also passing for 184 yards and an interception in the 35–20 Syracuse win. On what would become his final play in college, Shrader threw a game-winning touchdown pass against Wake Forest, clinching an appearance in the 2023 Boca Raton Bowl for Syracuse against South Florida. Following the Wake Forest game, he announced that he would not play in the bowl game, opting for surgery on his injured shoulder, which he had played with since October. He also declared his intent to pursue a career in the NFL.

=== Statistics ===
Year	Team	Games			Passing								Rushing			
Year	Team	GP	GS	Record	Cmp	Att	Pct	Yds	Avg	TD	Int	Rtg	Att	Yds	Avg	TD
2019	Mississippi State	10	4	2–2	88	153	57.5	1,170	7.6	8	5	132.5	113	587	5.2	6
2020	Mississippi State	4	0	0–0	0	0	0.0	0	0.0	0	0	0.0	0	0	0.0	0
2021	Syracuse	12	9	3–6	123	234	52.6	1,445	6.2	9	4	113.7	173	781	4.5	14
2022	Syracuse	12	12	7–5	206	318	64.8	2,645	8.3	17	7	147.9	150	444	3.0	9
2023	Syracuse	11	10	6–4	134	214	62.6	1,686	7.9	13	6	143.2	113	469	4.2	8
Career		49	35	18−17	550	918	59.9	6,941	7.6	47	22	135.5	548	2,290	4.2	37

== Professional career ==
On December 10, 2024, Shrader signed with the BC Lions of the Canadian Football League (CFL). He was released by the Lions on May 11, 2025. On July 2, Shrader re-signed with the Lions, this time joining their practice roster. He was again released on August 12.
