= 2019 Redbox Bowl =

Postseason college football bowl game

- 18th Redbox Bowl
California Golden Bears	Illinois Fighting Illini
(7–5)	(6–6)
Pac-12	Big Ten
35	20
Head coach: Justin Wilcox	Head coach: Lovie Smith
	1	2	3	4	Total
California	7	14	7	7	35
Illinois	10	3	0	7	20
- Date: December 30, 2019
- Season: 2019
- Stadium: Levi's Stadium
- Location: Santa Clara, California
- MVP: Chase Garbers (QB, Cal) & Zeandae Johnson (DE, Cal)
- Favorite: California by 6
- Referee: Matt Loeffler (SEC)
- Attendance: 34,177
- Payout: US$3,600,000

United States TV coverage
- Network: Fox
- Announcers: Joe Davis (play-by-play); Brock Huard (analyst); Bruce Feldman (sideline)

The 2019 Redbox Bowl was a college football bowl game played on December 30, 2019, with kickoff at 4:00 p.m. EST (1:00 p.m. local PDT) on Fox. It was the 18th and final edition of the Redbox Bowl, though only the second under the current name, and was one of the 2019–20 bowl games concluding the 2019 FBS football season. The game was sponsored by Redbox, a DVD and video game rental company.

== Teams ==
The game was played between the California Golden Bears from the Pac-12 Conference and the Illinois Fighting Illini from the Big Ten Conference. This was the 11th meeting between the programs; Illinois led the all-time series, 7–3.

=== California Golden Bears ===
California entered the bowl with a 7–5 record (4–5 in conference). The Golden Bears finished in a three-way tie for second place in the Pac-12's North Division. They were 1–2 against ranked teams, defeating Washington while losing to Oregon and Utah. This was California's second Redbox Bowl; their 2008 team won the then-Emerald Bowl over Miami (FL), 24–17.

=== Illinois Fighting Illini ===
Illinois entered the bowl with a 6–6 record (4–5 in conference). The Fighting Illini finished in fourth place of the West Division of the Big Ten. They were also 1–2 against ranked teams, defeating Wisconsin while losing to Michigan and Iowa. This was also Illinois' second Redbox Bowl; their 2011 team won the then-Kraft Fight Hunger Bowl over UCLA, 20–14.

== Game summary ==
2019 Redbox Bowl

Quarter	1	2	3	4	Total
California	7	14	7	7	35
Illinois	10	3	0	7	20

at Levi's Stadium • Santa Clara, California

- Date: Monday, December 30, 2019
- Game time: 4:00 p.m. EST (1:00 p.m. PST)
- Game weather: Clear • Temperature: 59 °F (15 °C) • Wind: NW 8 mph
- Game attendance: 34,177
- Referee: Matt Loeffler
- TV announcers (Fox): Joe Davis (play-by-play), Brock Huard (analyst) and Bruce Feldman (sideline)
- ESPN game summary

Game information

First Quarter

- (12:02) ILL – James McCourt 25 yard field goal (Drive: 9 plays, 64 yards, 2:21; Illinois 3–0)
- (7:09) CAL – Chase Garbers 4 yard pass to Collin Moore, Greg Thomas kick (Drive: 6 plays, 79 yards, 3:03; California 7–3)
- (0:10) ILL – Daniel Barker 5 yard pass from Brandon Peters, James McCourt kick (Drive: 15 plays, 75 yards, 6:59; Illinois 10–7)

Second Quarter

- (12:12) CAL – Chase Garbers 1 yard rush, Greg Thomas kick (Drive: 8 plays, 84 yards, 2:54; California 14–10)
- (0:25) CAL – Christopher Brown Jr. 3 yard pass from Chase Garbers, Greg Thomas kick (Drive: 12 plays, 97 yards, 4:55; California 21–10)
- (0:00) ILL – James McCourt 30 yard field goal (Drive: 4 plays, 58 yards, 0:25; California 21–13)

Third Quarter

- (10:45) CAL – Gavin Reinwald 2 yard pass from Chase Garbers, Greg Thomas kick (Drive: 7 plays, 56 yards, 2:07; California 28–13)

Fourth Quarter

- (11:54) CAL – Nikko Remigio 6 yard pass from Chase Garbers, Greg Thomas kick (Drive: 12 plays, 88 yards, 5:36; California 35–13)
- (8:01) ILL – Reggie Corbin 6 yard rush, James McCourt kick (Drive: 9 plays, 75 yards, 3:05; California 35–20)

=== Statistics ===
Statistics	CAL	ILL
First downs	24	24
Plays–yards	68–395	77–450
Rushes–yards	37–123	38–165
Passing yards	272	285
Passing: comp–att–int	22–31–0	23–39–1
Time of possession	28:44	29:07

Team	Category	Player	Statistics
California	Passing	Chase Garbers	22/31, 272 yards, 4 TD
California	Rushing	Christopher Brown Jr.	20 carries, 120 yards
California	Receiving	Makai Polk	5 receptions, 105 yards
Illinois	Passing	Brandon Peters	22/37, 273 yards, 1 TD, 1 INT
Illinois	Rushing	Brandon Peters	8 carries, 68 yards
Illinois	Receiving	Donny Navarro	6 receptions, 77 yards
