= Bergen Catholic High School =

Catholic high school in New Jersey, US

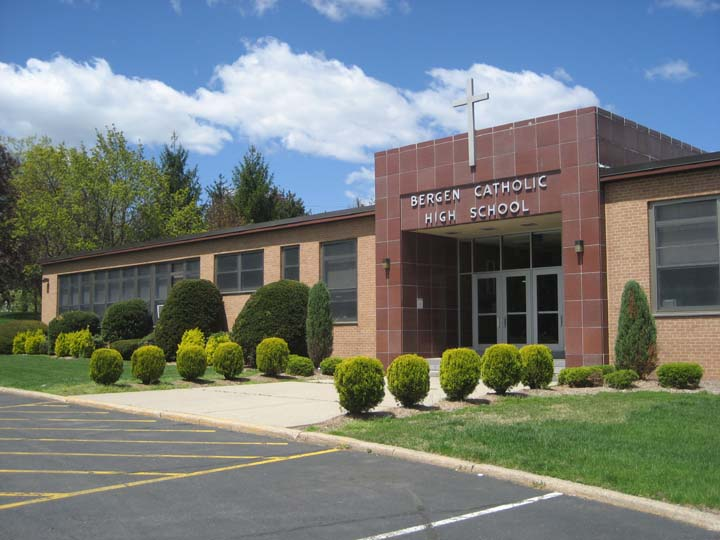
- Bergen Catholic in 2007

Location
- 1040 Oradell Avenue; Oradell, (Bergen County), New Jersey 07649; United States; 40.959302°N 74.049659°W

Information
- Type: Private
- Motto: Deus vult ("God wills it")
- Religious affiliations: Roman Catholic, Congregation of Christian Brothers
- Established: 1955
- School code: BGB
- NCES School ID: 00861718
- President: Brian Mahoney
- Principal: Timothy McElhinney
- Chaplain: Sam Monaco
- Faculty: NA FTEs
- Grades: 9–12
- Enrollment: 721 (as of 2023–24)
- Average class size: 25
- Student to teacher ratio: NA
- Campus type: Suburban
- Colors: Scarlet and gold
- Song: Lead on Bergen Catholic High
- Athletics: 17 varsity sports
- Athletics conference: Big North Conference (general); North Jersey Super Football Conference (football)
- Sports: Football, basketball, soccer, ice hockey, lacrosse, volleyball, golf, swimming, tennis, bowling, baseball, cross country, wrestling, track and field, crew and skiing
- Mascot: Crusader
- Team name: Crusaders
- Rival: Don Bosco Prep, St. Joseph Regional
- Accreditation: Middle States Association of Colleges and Schools
- Publication: The Talisman (literary magazine)
- Newspaper: The Herald
- Yearbook: The Crusader
- Tuition: $21,600 (2025–26)
- Alumni: 11,000+
- Athletic Director: Brendan McGovern
- Website: bergencatholic.org

Bergen Catholic High School is an all-male Roman Catholic high school in Oradell, in Bergen County, in the U.S. state of New Jersey, serving students in ninth through twelfth grade.

Bergen Catholic operates under the supervision of the Archdiocese of Newark. The school draws students from a wide geographic area that includes over 100 North Jersey communities, Rockland, Orange, Westchester counties and New York City.

== Accreditation ==
The school has been accredited by the Middle States Association of Colleges and Schools Commission on Elementary and Secondary Schools since 1989, and is accredited until January 2026.

== Enrollment ==
As of the 2023–24 school year, the school had an enrollment of 721 students.

== Activities ==
=== Mock trial team ===
The Bergen Catholic mock trial team has won 13 county championships (in 1985, 1989, 1991, 1993, 1996, 2000-2002, 2010, 2015-2017, 2019, and 2023) and five state titles (in 1985, 1989, 1991, 2000, and 2016), as well as a National Championship. Bergen Catholic's team is nearly entirely student-run. In 1991, Bergen Catholic High School won the National High School Mock Trial Championships held in New Orleans, Louisiana. Bergen Catholic returned to the national championship hosted in Columbia, South Carolina in 2000 after going undefeated in the county, Regional and State tournaments. The 1999-2000 team ultimately finished 4th in the country, with three "Outstanding Attorney" awards. The 2016 team won the New Jersey state championship, sending it to the National High School Mock Trial Championship in Boise, Idaho.

In the 2008–09 season the team made it to the county finals, losing to Indian Hills High School. In 2010, the team defeated Mahwah High School to win the Bergen County championship, but the team lost in the regional semi-finals, ending its season as one of the top ten teams in the state. The Bergen Catholic team fell in the semi-final round of the county tournament at the end of January 2011 to the Mahwah High School team that went on to win the 2011 Bergen County Championship.

Bergen Catholic's Mock Trial team finished undefeated in the regular season in 2014 and finished third overall in the county. In the 2015 season Bergen Catholic again finished undefeated in the regular season. In the "playoff" tournament Bergen Catholic defeated Northern Valley Demarest in the first round. Then on January 29, 2015, in a double header, defeated Mahwah (2014's county champion) in the semifinals and Indian Hills in the finals.

== Athletics ==
The Bergen Catholic Crusaders compete as a member of the Big North Conference (United Division), a super conference that is comprised of public and private high schools in Bergen and Passaic counties that operates under the supervision of the New Jersey State Interscholastic Athletic Association. Until the NJSIAA's 2009 realignment, the school had participated in Division C of the Northern New Jersey Interscholastic League, which included high schools located in Bergen County, Essex County and Passaic, and was separated into three divisions based on NJSIAA size classification. With 984 students in grades 10-12, the school was classified by the NJSIAA for the 2019–20 school year as Non-Public A for most athletic competition purposes, which included schools with an enrollment of 381 to 1,454 students in that grade range (equivalent to Group I for public schools). The football team competes in the United Red division of the North Jersey Super Football Conference, which includes 112 schools competing in 20 divisions, making it the nation's biggest football-only high school sports league. The school was classified by the NJSIAA as Non-Public Group A (equivalent to Group III/IV/V for public schools) for football for 2024–2026, which included schools with 738 to 1,404 students.

Bergen Catholic has a long-standing rivalry with fellow Catholic schools Don Bosco Preparatory High School in Ramsey which was ranked first in the state by NJ.com (with Don Bosco holding a 38-28-2 lead in the series) and with Saint Joseph Regional High School in Montvale, which was listed at 14th on NJ.com's 2017 list "Ranking the 31 fiercest rivalries in N.J. HS football" (with Bergen Catholic leading with a 31–17 overall record as of 2017).

Bergen Catholic offers 17 sports at the varsity level:

- Fall sports: football, soccer, and cross country
- Winter sports: wrestling, basketball, swimming, indoor track, bowling, ice hockey, and skiing
- Spring sports: baseball, lacrosse, golf, tennis, outdoor track, volleyball, and crew

=== Football ===
Bergen Catholic has one of the most successful programs in New Jersey. The Crusaders are 20-time state champions: they were awarded the Parochial A North title by the NJSIAA in 1963, 1965 and 1966, and won via playoffs in 1979, 1980, 1982, 1986, 1991, 1992, 1993, 1995, 1996, 1998, 1999, 2001, 2004, 2017, 2021, 2022, 2023 and 2024. Through the 2019 season, the team had an overall record against in-state teams of 420-156-10 (a winning percentage of .725). A record of 99–10 between 1990 and 1999 made Bergen Catholic the winningest football program in the state of New Jersey for the decade of the 1990s.

The 1979 team defeated DePaul Catholic High School by a score of 14–6 in the Parochial A North championship game at Giants Stadium to finish the season 10-0-1. The 1980 team finished the season at 8-2-1 after winning the Parochial A North title with a 12–0 win against Seton Hall Preparatory School in the finals. The 1982 team defeated Immaculata High School by a score of 25–0 in the playoff finals to win the Parochial A North sectional title and finish the season at 11-0. The 1986 team finished the season with a 9-1-1 record after defeating St. Peter's Preparatory School by a score of 33–0 in the Parochial A North sectional championship game played at Hinchliffe Stadium. The 1991 team finished the season 11-0 after defeating Saint Joseph Regional High School by a score of 14–0 to win the Parochial A North championship and earn a ranking of 11th from USA Today. The undefeated 1992 team's championship game with Paramus Catholic High School, which Bergen won 44–34, was voted "Game of the Century" by The Record. One of the most anticipated high school games in New Jersey history was their championship game in 1998, when BC won the Parochial Group IV championship by defeating rival St. Joseph Regional 35–9 in the final at Giants Stadium. The 1998 team finished with a 12–0 record, and was ranked first in New Jersey, 9th in USA Today national poll, and was voted "Team of the Century" by The Record.

Since 1998, the program has been to the state championship game 12 times. The 2001 team finished the season with a record of 10–2 after defeating Delbarton School by a score of 10–9 on a fourth-quarter field goal in the Parochial Group IV sectional finals. In 2004, the team went to Giants Stadium to play archrival Don Bosco Prep and won the state championship with a 13–10 victory, thanks to the play of Brian Cushing. Cushing would later go on to become one of two players to have started in four Rose Bowl football games (Archie Griffin of Ohio State University was the other) as well as an All-American at USC and a 1st round draft pick of the Houston Texans who was named NFL Defensive Rookie of the Year in 2009.

After a 13-year drought, the team finished the season with a 10–2 record and won the 2017 Non-Public Group IV state sectional championship with a 44–7 win against St. Peter's Preparatory School in the title game of the tournament; The team dominated all three rounds, defeating eighth-seeded St. Augustine Preparatory School by a score of 56–21 in the first round and fifth seed Delbarton School 41–16 in the semifinals, before scoring 44 points in the final.

In 2021, the Crusaders defeated Don Bosco Prep by a score of 28–7 in the tournament's final game at MetLife Stadium to win the Non-Public A state championship and finish the season with a 12–0 record. The team, which won its 15th state title, was recognized as the 3rd best high school football team in the country according to USA Today and fourth nationwide by MaxPreps.

=== Wrestling ===
The Crusader wrestling program has been the most successful in Bergen County over the past two decades. Bergen Catholic has won the Bergen County Championship 20 times (1990, 1991, 1993, 1994, 1995, 1996, 1999, 2000, 2001, 2002, 2003, 2004, 2005, 2006, 2007, 2011, 2013, 2014, 2015, 2016, 2017, 2022), most in county history and hold the record for most consecutive titles by winning nine straight from 1999 to 2007. The Crusaders have won the North Parochial "A" state sectional title 22 times (1990, 1991, 1992, 1994, 1995, 1996, 2002, 2003, 2004, 2005, 2006, 2008, 2009, 2012-2019, 2022) and in 14 of those seasons they have gone on to win the overall Parochial "A" state championship (1991, 1994, 1995, 2002, 2003, 2012-2019, 2022); The program's 14 state championships are the fourth most of any team in the state.

One of the most memorable of those state championship wins came in Trenton in 2003 where the Crusaders upset heavily favored Camden Catholic High School 40–30. In addition to state and county titles, BC has won the District crown in 32 consecutive seasons (1990–2022). BC has also seen six of its wrestlers win a total of 12 individual state championships. The 2013-14 team won their first Star-Ledger Trophy as the #1 ranked team in the state of New Jersey and was ranked within the top ten in various national polls.

In 2016, Nick Suriano won his fourth consecutive state championship, finishing his career with a record of 159–0 and becoming the second wrestler in state history to complete his career undefeated while winning four state titles.

=== Basketball ===
The basketball team won the Non-Public A state championship in 1978 (defeating St. Anthony High School in the tournament final), 1994 (vs. Camden Catholic High School) and 2002 (vs. St. Augustine Preparatory School) and 2019 (vs. Camden Catholic).

Bergen Catholic won their first Bergen County Jamboree in 1977, and has a total of nine county championships with the most recent in 2015. Through the history of the Bergen County Jamboree, Bergen Catholic holds the most total games played, total wins, and championship appearances. They also rank second in appearances and championships. Bergen has won nine North Parochial "A" state sectional championships and four Parochial "A" state championships. Their most recent success came in the 2001–02 and 2002–03. The 2002 team captured the school's first state championship in more than 10 years with a 71–69 win over St. Augustine Prep. The team would make it to the semi-finals of the Tournament of Champions where they eventually fell to St. Anthony. The 2002–03 team consisted of five Division I players. They finished with a 25–4 record and a #3 ranking in New Jersey. They captured the school's most recent Bergen County Jamboree along with another sectional championship." The Crusaders won the 2015 Bergen County Jamboree by a 66-44 score in the tournament final, defeating a Teaneck High School team that had previously won four consecutive Jamboree championships.

=== Ice hockey ===
Bergen Catholic's hockey program first hit the ice during the 1967–68 season and ran through the 1971–72 season. The school has enjoyed a continuous run of interscholastic ice hockey since the 1974–75 season and immediately achieved success with a league title. The Crusaders would go on to win a Bergen County Championship in just three years time, raising the cup in 1978 and bringing home two more in 1980 and 1981. Since the 1990s, the Crusaders participate in the Gordon Conference, which includes other college preparatory high schools in New Jersey. Area rivals include Don Bosco Prep, Delbarton, Christian Brothers Academy, Seton Hall Prep, St. Peter's Prep and St. Joseph's Montvale. The Crusaders captured state championships in 2001 and 2003. In 2001, the Crusaders defeated Christian Brothers Academy in the Parochial pool 3-2 and then went on to defeat Clifton High School for the state title 8–1. In 2003, the Crusaders defeated Seton Hall Prep in the parochial pool 2–1 and defeated Randolph for the state championship 6-4. As a result of this success, the Crusaders were recognized as the North Jersey Team of the Decade (2000-2009).

The team had an 18–5–0 record in 2019–20 where the Crusaders were ranked the #3 team in New Jersey. The highlight of the 2019–20 campaign was defeating rival Don Bosco Preparatory High School for the Crusaders' first Bergen County Tournament Championship. The Crusaders were also the first team to win the Championship other than Don Bosco who had won eight straight titles since the Tournament's inception.

=== Golf ===
The Bergen Catholic golf program has earned 101 championship titles, nine Tournament of Champions titles and 52 league titles. With a record of 984-33-1 through the 2015 season, Coach Jim Jacobsen is the winningest golf coach in state athletics history and has been at the helm since 1983. The most recent being May 2015, where the program captured the State Meet of Champions trophy and the number 1 ranking in the state.

=== Bowling ===
The boys bowling team won the overall state championships in 1998 and 1999.

=== Lacrosse ===
The school started a varsity lacrosse program in 1995. The varsity program has posted a 218-173 overall record (.558 winning percentage). The team enjoyed its first winning season and NJSIAA playoff berth in 1997. In 1999, the Crusaders won the Catholic Schools Lacrosse Tournament. While a part of the NNJIL, BC won four consecutive league titles from 2002 - 2005. The program had a three-year winning streak in its current conference, the NNJIL "Gibbs" Division, winning in 2013, 2014, 2015. Bergen Catholic has won four varsity county championships, in 2006, 2009, 2014 and 2015. In 2013, the JV Crusaders won its first county championship. In 2015, the team won the NJSIAA Non Public A state championship, the program's first, with a 15–14 victory over Delbarton School. The Crusaders continued on to defeat Summit High School 8–5 in the semifinal round of the Tournament of Champions before losing to Bridgewater-Raritan High School in the finals, by a score of 16–13. The 2015 Crusaders set a school record and led New Jersey in scoring with 365 goals on the season.

=== Soccer ===
The school started their soccer team when the school was first founded in 1965. The team won the Non-Public A state championship in 1987 (defeating Notre Dame High School in the tournament final) and 1999 (vs. Christian Brothers Academy). The Crusaders have won their state section five times. (1976, 1985, 1987, 1988, 1999). Bergen Catholic were also named the Bergen County champions three times (1986, 1999, 2019) and the reigning county champions in their win over Ridgewood High School on October 27.

The soccer program has produced more than 20 college Division I players and in specifically the 2003 MLS Superdraft first overall player Alecko Eskandarian. He posted 156 career goals for the Crusaders and 66 goals his senior year where the team won their county, state section, and state tournaments.

=== Spring track ===
The track team won the Non-Public Group A spring / outdoor track state championship in 1963, 1964 and 1977.

=== Baseball ===
The baseball team won the Non-Public Group A state championship in 1968, defeating Holy Spirit High School in the tournament final.

=== Cross country ===
The cross country team won the Non-Public Group A state title in 1970 and 1977.

=== Indoor relay ===
The track team won the Non-Public indoor relay championship 1975 (as co-champion).

== Notable alumni ==
Many of the alumni listed have been recognized by induction into the school's Hall of Fame:

- Antonio Alfano (born 2000), American football defensive tackle for the Edmonton Elks of the Canadian Football League
- Steve Angeli (born 2003), American football quarterback for the Syracuse Orange
- Joe Azelby (born 1962, class of 1980), professional football player who played for the Buffalo Bills, businessman and author
- Mike Bajakian (born 1974, class of 1992), Tampa Bay Buccaneers quarterbacks coach, former offensive coordinator for the University of Tennessee
- Sean Banks (born 1985, class of 2003), professional basketball player
- Carl Barisich (born 1951, class of 1969), former defensive tackle for nine seasons between 1973 and 1981 for four different NFL teams
- Jayden Bellamy (born 2003, class of 2022), college football cornerback for the UCF Knights
- Elliot Cadeau (born 2004), basketball point guard who plays for the Michigan Wolverines
- Jacob Cardenas (born 2001) freestyle and folkstyle wrestler
- Charley Casserly (born 1948, class of 1967), former general manager of the Washington Redskins and Houston Texans in the National Football League, and current NFL analyst for CBS Sports, especially The NFL Today
- Brandon Crawley (born 1997), former professional ice hockey player
- John Crowley (born 1967, class of 1985), biotech executive who helped develop a treatment for Pompe disease after his children were diagnosed with the condition
- Brian Cushing (born 1987, class of 2005), Houston Texans linebacker
- Alvaro de Molina (born 1957, class of 1975), CFO of Bank of America and CEO of GMAC
- John Delaney (born 1963, class of 1981), politician and businessman, United States Representative for Maryland's 6th congressional district and the first major Democrat to announce he was running for president in 2020
- Nicholas Delpopolo (born 1989), judoka who has represented the United States at the 2012 Summer Olympics and 2016 Summer Olympics
- Dean DeNobile (born 2003), college football quarterback for the Florida State Seminoles
- Christopher DePhillips (born 1965, class of 1983), politician who has represented the 40th Legislative District in the New Jersey General Assembly since 2018
- Mark DeRosa (born 1975, class of 1993), MLB Network show host and former San Francisco Giants left fielder
- Garrett Dickerson (born 1995, class of 2014), tight end for the New York Giants
- Jim Dray (born 1986, class of 2005), San Francisco 49ers tight end
- Doug Edert (born 2000, class of 2019), college basketball player for the Bryant Bulldogs of the America East Conference, who became the breakout star of Saint Peter's 2022 NCAA tournament run
- Alecko Eskandarian (born 1982, class of 2000), former MLS player; first pick of the 2003 MLS SuperDraft
- Mark Fabish (born 1975, class of 1993), American football coach and former player who is the interim head coach for the Columbia Lions
- A.J. Ferrari (born 2001, class of 2020), wrestler at the Oklahoma State University
- Jim Finn (born 1976, class of 1995), former New York Giants fullback
- Zach Freemantle (born 2000, class of 2019), college basketball player for the Xavier Musketeers
- Jarrett Guarantano (born 1997), American football quarterback for the San Antonio Brahmas of the United Football League
- Wil Horneff (born 1979, class of 1997), actor who appeared on film in The Sandlot and Born to Be Wild
- Robert Howard (born 2002, class of 2020), wrestler at the Pennsylvania State University and Youth Summer Olympic gold medalist
- Javontae Jean-Baptiste (born 2000, class of 2018), defensive end for the Washington Commanders
- Zane Kalemba (born 1985), professional ice hockey goaltender who played for Manchester Storm in the Elite Ice Hockey League
- Bob Lally (born 1952, class of 1970), linebacker who played in the National Football League for the Green Bay Packers and in the World Football League for the Memphis Southmen
- Eric Lane (born 1974), running back who played in the NFL for the New York Giants
- David P. Long (born 1975, class of 1993), academic administrator, professor and Roman Catholic canonist
- Matt LoVecchio (born 1982, class of 2000), starting quarterback for the University of Notre Dame football team in 2000–01, and for Indiana University in 2003–04
- Bill Madden (born 1946, class of 1964), sports columnist for the New York Daily News and recipient of the 2010 J. G. Taylor Spink Award for meritorious contributions to baseball writing presented by the Baseball Writers' Association of America
- Tywone Malone Jr. (born 2003, class of 2021), defensive tackle for the Carolina Panthers
- Kevin Marfo (born 1997), professional basketball player for Fortitudo Agrigento in Italy's Serie A2 league
- Tanner McEvoy (born 1993, class of 2011), wide receiver for the Seattle Seahawks
- Bill McGovern (1962–2023), college and professional football coach
- Jim McGovern (born 1965, class of 1983), professional golfer who has played on the PGA Tour and the Nationwide Tour
- Rob McGovern (born 1966), former American football linebacker who played for the Kansas City Chiefs, Pittsburgh Steelers and New England Patriots
- Pierre McGuire (born 1961, class of 1979), NBC Sports analyst
- Dennis McNerney (class of 1984), former County Executive of Bergen County
- Aram Minnetian (born 2005), professional ice hockey player for the Texas Stars of the American Hockey League
- Rohan Mirchandani (1982–2024), co-founder and CEO of Epigamia, a leading Greek yogurt brand in India
- James Oleske, pediatrician and HIV/AIDS researcher who is the emeritus François-Xavier Bagnoud Professor of Pediatrics at Rutgers New Jersey Medical School
- Miles Orman (born 1984, class of 2003), actor who played Miles Robinson on Sesame Street, son of Roscoe Orman, who played Gordon
- John B. Paolella (born 1949, class of 1967), politician who represented the 38th Legislative District in both houses of the New Jersey Legislature
- Bob Papa (born 1964, class of 1982), New York Giants play-by-play sportscaster
- Randi Patterson (born 1985, class of 2003), professional soccer player, played internationally for the Soca Warriors
- Jon Poppe (born 1984, class of 2003), head coach for the Columbia Lions football team
- Quincy Porter, American football wide receiver for the Notre Dame Fighting Irish
- Kyle Queiro (born 1994, class of 2013), safety in the National Football League for the Dallas Cowboys
- Darren Rizzi (born 1970, class of 1988), special teams coordinator and assistant head coach for the Denver Broncos who served as the interim head coach for the New Orleans Saints during the 2024 season
- David C. Russo (born 1953), attorney and politician, who represented the 40th legislative district in the New Jersey General Assembly from 1990 to 2017
- Kaj Sanders (born 2006, class of 2024), college football defensive back for the Rutgers Scarlet Knights
- Rich Scanlon (born 1980, class of 1999), former New York Giants linebacker
- Roger Steffens (born 1942, class of 1960), actor, author, lecturer, editor, reggae archivist, photographer and producer
- Nick Suriano (born 1997, class of 2016), 2019 NCAA Division I National Wrestling Champion
- Andy Unanue (class of 1985), former executive with Goya Foods
- Isaiah Williams (born 1987, class of 2005), former NFL wide receiver
