= Alvaro de Molina =

American financial officer

Alvaro de Molina (born July 13, 1957) is a former chief financial officer of Bank of America Corporation. He had been with the company since joining one of its predecessors in 1989.

De Molina graduated in 1975 from Bergen Catholic High School in Oradell, New Jersey, and was inducted into the school's hall of fame in 2012. He then attended Fairleigh Dickinson University, graduating with a bachelor's degree in accounting. He obtained an MBA in 1988 from Rutgers Business School. He later attended Duke University's Advanced Management Program.

On Dec. 1, 2006, he announced his resignation as CFO of Bank of America, effective at the end of the year. At the time of his resignation he had been finance chief for only 14 months, but had spent 17 years at Bank of America. He ran treasury services and investment banking before becoming chief financial officer in 2005.

De Molina joined Cerberus-controlled GMAC in August 2007, becoming chief operating officer.

On March 18, 2008, GMAC LLC named de Molina its chief executive officer.

On July 9, 2008, The Wall Street Journal reported that de Molina had made it to Wachovia's shortlist of potential CEOs: "Mr. de Molina, 50 years old, is considered an outspoken and bold leader who would shake things up in trying to turn around Wachovia, though he might have difficulty fitting into Wachovia's genteel corporate culture."
