= 2023 Boca Raton Bowl =

Postseason college football bowl game

2023 RoofClaim.com Boca Raton Bowl
- 10th Boca Raton Bowl
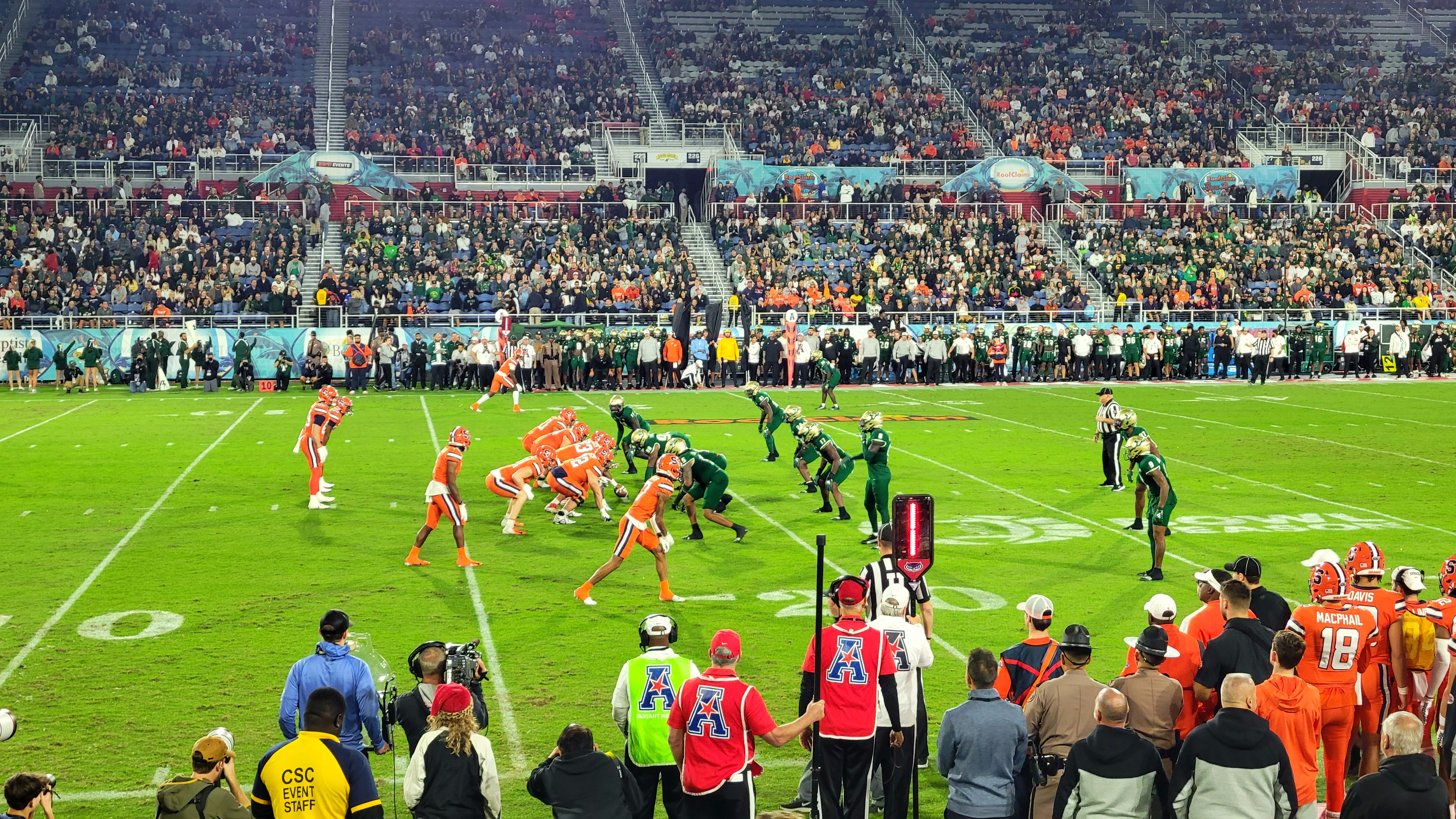
South Florida Bulls	Syracuse Orange
(6–6)	(6–6)
The American	ACC
45	0
Head coach: Alex Golesh	Head coach: Nunzio Campanile (interim)
	1	2	3	4	Total
South Florida	14	17	7	7	45
Syracuse	0	0	0	0	0
- Date: December 21, 2023
- Season: 2023
- Stadium: FAU Stadium
- Location: Boca Raton, Florida
- MVP: Offense: Byrum Brown (QB, South Florida); Defense: Daquan Evans (DB, South Florida); Special Teams: Aamaris Brown (DB, South Florida)
- Favorite: Syracuse by 3.5
- Referee: Jeremy Parker (Sun Belt)
- Attendance: 20,711

United States TV coverage
- Network: ESPN; ESPN Radio
- Announcers: Matt Barrie (play-by-play), Dan Mullen (analyst), and Harry Lyles Jr. (sideline) (ESPN); Chris Carlin (play-by-play) and Harry Douglas (analyst) (ESPN Radio)

International TV coverage
- Network: ESPN Deportes

The 2023 Boca Raton Bowl was a college football bowl game played on December 21, 2023, at FAU Stadium in Boca Raton, Florida. The 10th annual Boca Raton Bowl featured the Syracuse Orange of the Atlantic Coast Conference (ACC) and the South Florida Bulls of the American Athletic Conference (AAC or The American). The game began at approximately 8:00 p.m. EST and was aired on ESPN. The Boca Raton Bowl was one of the 2023–24 bowl games concluding the 2023 FBS football season. The game was sponsored by roofing repair company RoofClaim.com and was officially known as the RoofClaim.com Boca Raton Bowl. The Bulls defeated the Orange 45–0, the largest shutout in collegiate bowl game history.

== Teams ==
The game featured the Syracuse Orange and the South Florida Bulls. This was the 11th meeting between the two programs, and both teams' first Boca Raton Bowl. Entering the game, the Bulls led the Orange in the all-time series, 8–2. From 2005 to 2012, South Florida and Syracuse both competed as members of the Big East Conference.

=== Syracuse Orange ===
The Orange entered the game with a 6–6 record (2–6 in the ACC), having finished tied for 11th place in their conference.

=== South Florida Bulls ===
The Bulls entered the game with a 6–6 record (4–4 in The American), having finished tied for fifth place in their conference.

== Game summary ==
2023 RoofClaim.com Boca Raton Bowl

Quarter	1	2	3	4	Total
South Florida	14	17	7	7	45
Syracuse	0	0	0	0	0

at FAU Stadium • Boca Raton, Florida

- Date: Thursday, December 21, 2023
- Game time: 8:00 p.m. EST
- Game weather: Sunny- • Temperature: 71 °F (22 °C) • Wind: 7 mph (11 km/h) NE
- Game attendance: 20,711
- Referee: Jeremy Parker
- TV announcers (ESPN): Matt Barrie (play-by-play), Dan Mullen (analyst), and Harry Lyles Jr. (sideline)
- Box score

Game information

First Quarter

- (7:49) USF – Sean Atkins 13 yard pass from Byrum Brown, John Cannon kick (Drive: 10 plays, 64 yards, 3:18; South Florida 7–0)
- (2:22) USF – Aamaris Brown 64 yard fumble return, John Cannon kick (South Florida 14–0)

Second Quarter

- (11:54) USF – Khafre Brown 31 yard pass from Byrum Brown, John Cannon kick (Drive: 6 plays, 81 yards, 2:18; South Florida 21–0)
- (2:40) USF – John Cannon 40 yard field goal (Drive: 8 plays, 29 yards, 3:02; South Florida 24–0)
- (0:09) USF – Tramel Logan 61 yard fumble return, John Cannon kick (South Florida 31–0)

Third Quarter

- (12:52) USF – Sean Atkins 35 yard pass from Byrum Brown, John Cannon kick (Drive: 4 plays, 43 yards, 1:27; South Florida 38–0)

Fourth Quarter

- (13:26) USF – Nay'Quan Wright 2 yard run, John Cannon kick (Drive: 7 plays, 26 yards, 2:36; South Florida 45–0)

=== Statistics ===
Statistics	USF	SYR
First downs	21	9
Plays–yards	75–407	64–159
Rushes–yards	44–161	41–20
Passing yards	246	139
Passing: comp–att–int	22–31–0	10–23–2
Time of possession	30:00	30:00

Team	Category	Player	Statistics
South Florida	Passing	Byrum Brown	19/26, 214 yards, 3 TD
South Florida	Rushing	Byrum Brown	14 carries, 65 yards
South Florida	Receiving	Sean Atkins	6 receptions, 93 yards, 2 TD
Syracuse	Passing	Braden Davis	6/12, 84 yards
Syracuse	Rushing	Dan Villari	11 carries, 37 yards
Syracuse	Receiving	Damien Alford	4 receptions, 83 yards
