= Rohan Mirchandani =

Indian businessman (1981/1982–2024)

Rohan Mirchandani (15 March 1982 – 21 December 2024) was an Indian businessman. He was the co-founder and CEO of Epigamia. Epigamia was renowned for being a leading Greek yogurt brand in India. He was known for his innovative creative and visionary thinking.

== Career ==
According to his official LinkedIn profile, he studied at the Bergen Catholic High School, New Jersey. He pursued Bachelor of Science degree in Finance and International Business at the New York University’s Stern School of Business and he obtained Master of Business Administration at the Wharton School of the University of Pennsylvania. He aspired to pursue his interest in business and entrepreneurship as he was passionate entering business field for a long time. He began his corporate career in 2004 as an Associate in the CVC division at Duff & Phelps, and he worked for about a year in the Greater New York City area locality. In 2005, he was inducted as a board member at The Ross Group, a private holding company which predominantly focuses on logistics and warehousing across various territories of North American region.

Mirchandani co-founded Drums Food International in 2013. He served as the chief executive officer of the company for over ten years. During his tenure, Drums Food International made rapid strides by undergoing a transformation from selling Hoki Poki ice cream to establishing Epigamia as a household name in the Indian fast moving consumer good market. Mirchandani implemented a paradigm shift approach to eagerly tackle the logistical challenges owing to the lack of innovation in India's FMCG sector, by incorporating his own eureka moment. He was also reported to have pinned ambitious attempts to expand his business into the Middle East by around 2025–26.

== Death ==
Mirchandani died after sustaining a cardiac arrest on 21 December 2024, at the age of 42. The news regarding his sudden death was confirmed in a press release statement by Drums Food International, the parent company of Epigamia. His death put spotlight and sparked rising alarm, concerns on the deaths of young entrepreneurs in India who are exposed to massive risks and challenges considering the uncertainties around entrepreneurship.
