= Eric Lane (running back, born 1974) =

American football player (born 1968)

No. 37
- Position: Fullback

Personal information
- Born: March 17, 1974 (age 52); East Orange, New Jersey, U.S.
- Listed height: 6 ft 2 in (1.88 m)
- Listed weight: 240 lb (109 kg)

Career information
- High school: Bergen Catholic (Oradell, New Jersey)
- College: Tennessee (1992–1996)
- NFL draft: 1997: undrafted

Career history
- New York Giants (1997); Atlanta Falcons (1999)*
- * Offseason or practice squad member only
- Stats at Pro Football Reference

Eric C. Lane (born March 17, 1974) is an American former professional football fullback who played for the New York Giants of the National Football League (NFL). He played college football for the Tennessee Volunteers.

== Early life ==
Eric C. Lane was born on March 17, 1974, in East Orange, New Jersey. He played high school football at Bergen Catholic High School in Oradell, New Jersey, rushing for 1,650 yards and 24 touchdowns his senior year.

== College career ==
Smith enrolled at the University of Tennessee to play college football for the Volunteers. He redshirted the 1992 season and was a four-year letterman from 1993 to 1996. He played in 44 games during his college career, rushing 53 times for 309 yards and four touchdowns while also catching 11 passes for 80 yards and three touchdowns.

== Professional career ==
After going undrafted in the 1997 NFL draft, Lane signed with the New York Giants on April 28. He played in 15 games during the 1997 season as a reserve fullback, rushing five times for 13 yards. He also appeared in one playoff game and carried once for one yard. Lane was released on August 24, 1998.

Lane was signed by the Atlanta Falcons on February 20, 1999. He was released on August 23, 1999.
