= Robert Howard (wrestler, born 2002) =

American wrestler

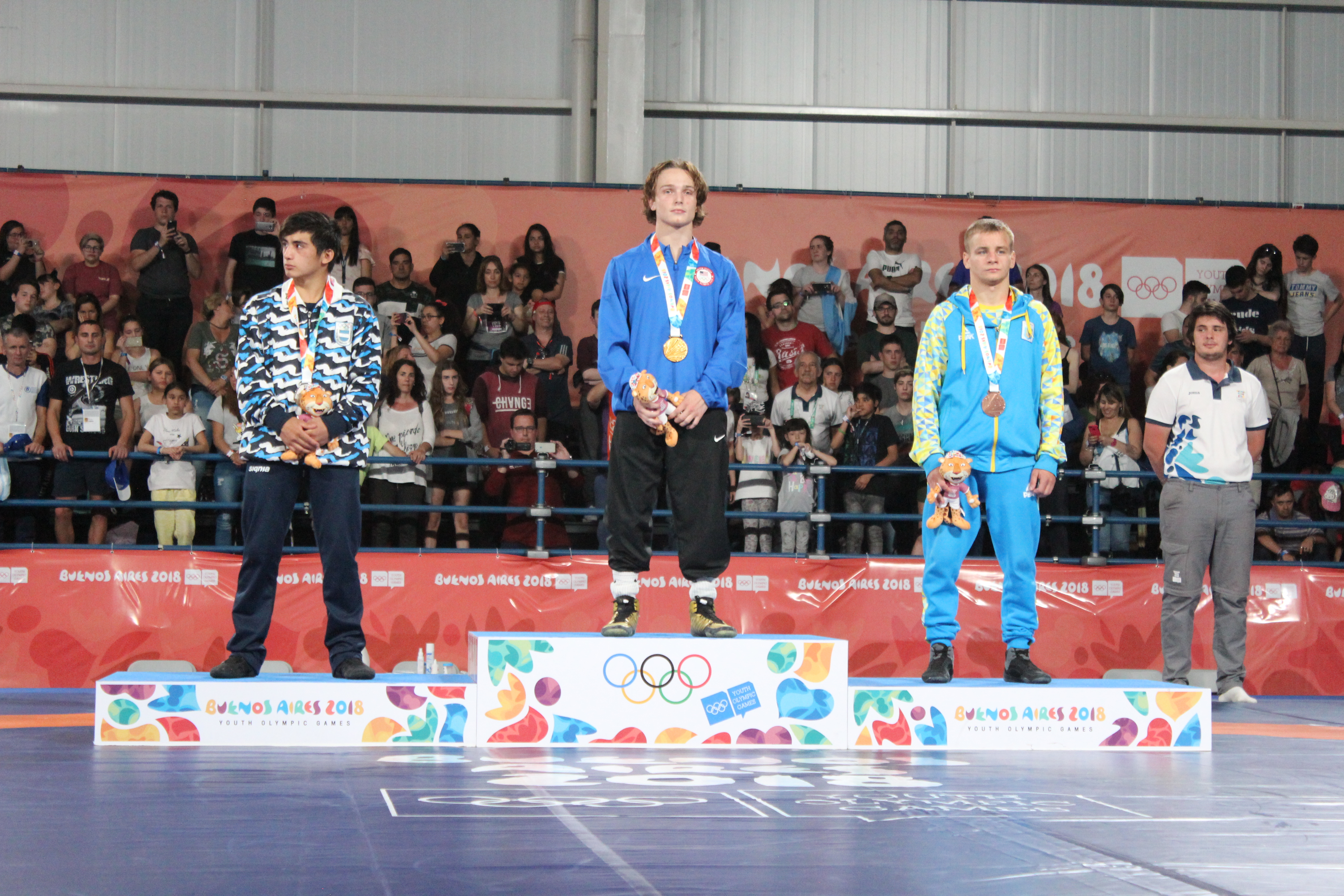
- Howard (on top of the podium) at the 2018 Summer Youth Olympics

Personal information
- Born: 1 March 2002 (age 24) Cranford, New Jersey, U.S.

Sport
- Country: United States
- Sport: Amateur wrestling
- Weight class: 125 lbs
- Events: Freestyle and Folkstyle
- College team: Penn State Nittany Lions
- Club: Nittany Lion Wrestling Club
Medal record
Men's freestyle wrestling
Representing the United States
Youth Olympic Games
| Gold medal – first place | 2018 Buenos Aires | 55 kg |

Robert Howard (born 1 March 2002) is an American former freestyle and folkstyle wrestler. In freestyle, he claimed the 2018 Youth Summer Olympic gold medal and was a three–time US Cadet World Team Member. In college, Howard wrestled for the Penn State Nittany Lions.

== Folkstyle career ==
=== High school ===
Howard, a native from Cranford, New Jersey, competed in high school wrestling out of Bergen Catholic High School, where he was the team captain and a four–time letterman. He went on to compile 133 victories to 10 defeats, claimed two NJSIAA state titles while making the finals four times and led the team to three team state championships before graduating.

=== College ===
A high school junior, Howard committed to Cael Sanderson and the Penn State Nittany Lions to attend the Pennsylvania State University.

==== 2020–2021 ====
As a freshman, Howard went 7–6 overall and 2–2 at the 2021 NCAA championships, with his biggest win of the year being against Ohio State's Malik Heinselman.

==== 2021–2022 ====
Howard redshirted his next season.

==== 2022–2023 ====
At the beginning of the 2022–2023 season, it was announced Howard would be out for the year due to a knee surgery.

== Freestyle career ==
=== Age–group level ===
As a cadet, Howard claimed the 2018 Youth Summer Olympic gold medal at 55 kilograms for the United States of America. He also made three US Cadet World Teams from 2017 to 2019, placing 13th, 9th and 5th at the Cadet World Championships.

== NCAA record ==
NCAA Division I Record
| Res. | Record | Opponent | Score | Date | Event |
Start of 2022–2023 Season (sophomore year)
End of 2020–2021 Season (freshman year)
2021 NCAA Championships DNP at 125 lbs
| Loss | 7–6 | Patrick McKee | Fall | March 18–20, 2021 | 2021 NCAA Division I National Championships |
| Win | 7–5 | Fabian Gutierrez | 9–7 | March 18–20, 2021 | 2021 NCAA Division I National Championships |
| Loss | 6–5 | Taylor Lamont | 1–2 | March 18–20, 2021 | 2021 NCAA Division I National Championships |
| Win | 6–4 | Malik Heinselman | 6–4 | March 18–20, 2021 | 2021 NCAA Division I National Championships |
2021 Big Ten Conference 6th at 125 lbs
| Loss | 5–4 | Michael DeAugustino | 2–4 | March 6–7, 2021 | 2021 Big Ten Conference Championships |
| Loss | 5–3 | Malik Heinselman | 2–5 | March 6–7, 2021 | 2021 Big Ten Conference Championships |
| Win | 5–2 | Dylan Ragusin | SV–1 3–1 | March 6–7, 2021 | 2021 Big Ten Conference Championships |
| Win | 4–2 | Dylan Shawver | MD 10–1 | March 6–7, 2021 | 2021 Big Ten Conference Championships |
| Win | 3–2 | Zach Spence | MD 16–4 | March 6–7, 2021 | 2021 Big Ten Conference Championships |
| Loss | 2–2 | Eric Barnett | 2–3 | March 6–7, 2021 | 2021 Big Ten Conference Championships |
| Win | 2–1 | Zach Spence | 10–4 | February 21, 2021 | Maryland - Penn State Dual |
| Loss | 1–1 | Malik Heinselman | 2–5 | February 19, 2021 | Penn State - Ohio State Dual |
| Win | 1–0 | Jack Medley | 6–5 | February 14, 2021 | Penn State - Michigan Dual |
Start of 2020-2021 Season (freshman year)

=== Stats ===
| Season | Year | School | Rank | Weigh Class | Record | Win | Bonus |
|---|---|---|---|---|---|---|---|
| 2021 | Freshman | Penn State University | #23 | 125 | 7–6 | 53.85% | 23.08% |
| Career | | | | | 7–6 | 53.85% | 23.08% |
