= Chris Ash =

American football coach (born 1973)

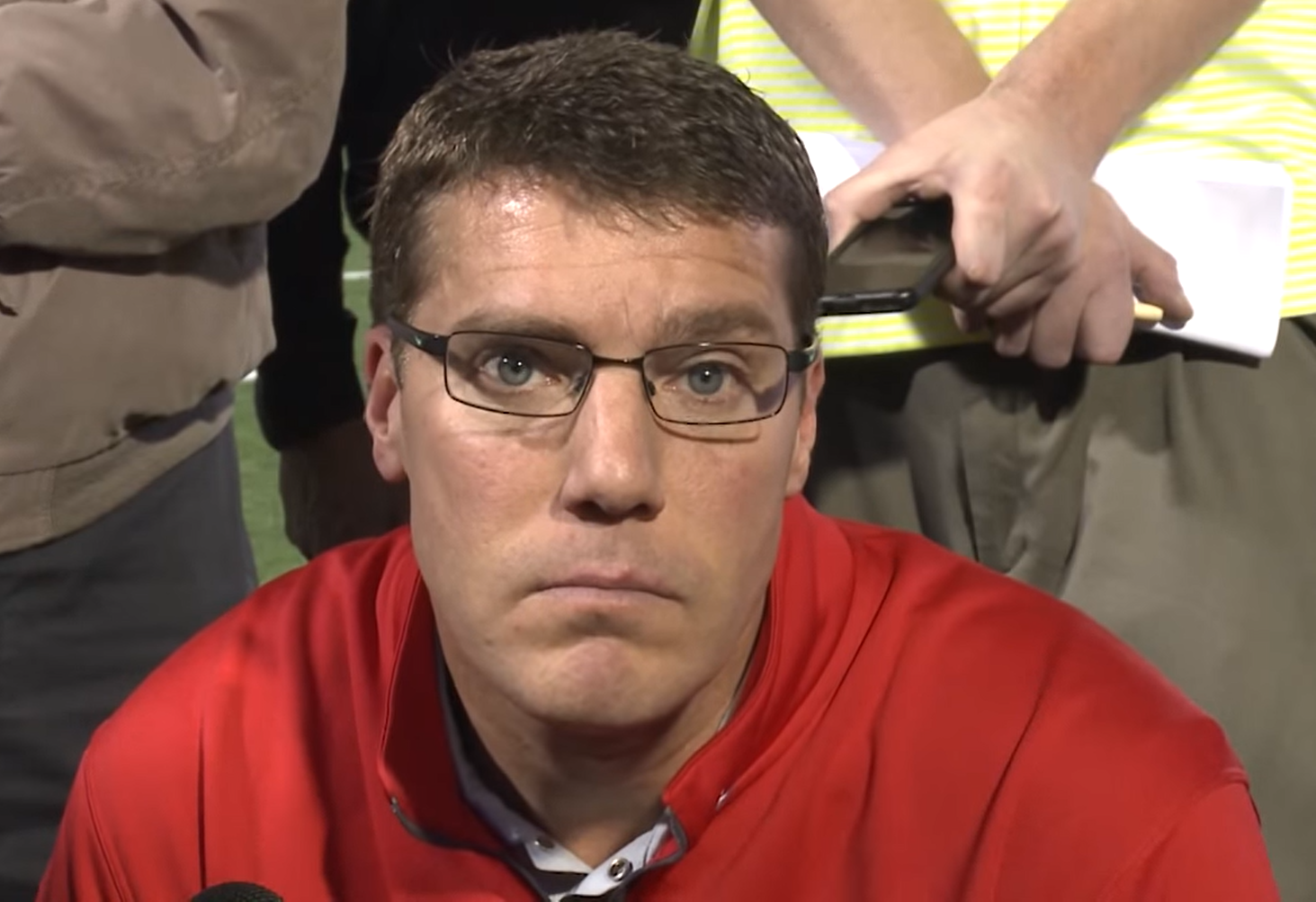
- Ash in 2015

Current position
- Title: Defensive coordinator
- Team: Notre Dame
- Conference: Independent

Biographical details
- Born: December 24, 1973 (age 52); Ottumwa, Iowa, U.S.

Playing career
- 1992–1995: Drake
- Position: Defensive back

Coaching career (HC unless noted)
- 1997: Drake (GA)
- 1998–1999: Drake (DC)
- 2000–2001: Iowa State (GA)
- 2002–2005: Iowa State (DB)
- 2006: Iowa State (DB/RC)
- 2007–08: San Diego State (DB/RC)
- 2009: Iowa State (DB/RC)
- 2010: Wisconsin (DB)
- 2011–2012: Wisconsin (DC/DB)
- 2013: Arkansas (DC/DB)
- 2014–2015: Ohio State (Co-DC/S)
- 2016–2019: Rutgers
- 2019: Texas (analyst)
- 2020: Texas (DC/S)
- 2021: Jacksonville Jaguars (S)
- 2022–2023: Las Vegas Raiders (DB)
- 2025–present: Notre Dame (DC)

Administrative career (AD unless noted)
- 2024: Jacksonville Jaguars (scout)

Head coaching record
- Overall: 8–32

Christopher Ash (born December 24, 1973) is an American football coach who is the defensive coordinator of the Notre Dame Fighting Irish. He served as the head coach of the Rutgers Scarlet Knights from 2016 to 2019, and defensive coordinator of the Wisconsin Badgers, Arkansas Razorbacks, Ohio State Buckeyes, and Texas Longhorns. He has also previously coached for the Jacksonville Jaguars and Las Vegas Raiders of the National Football League (NFL).

== Early years ==
Ash played college football at Drake University as a defensive back on the football team and earned his bachelor's degree. In 2005, Ash received his master's degree from Iowa State University.

== Coaching career ==
=== Early career ===
Ash held assistant coaching positions with the Drake Bulldogs, Princeton Tigers, Iowa State Cyclones, and San Diego State Aztecs, before being hired by the Wisconsin Badgers in 2010.

=== Arkansas ===
In 2012, Ash joined as the defensive coordinator at the University of Arkansas, following former Badgers head coach Bret Bielema who was hired in the same capacity at Arkansas.

=== Ohio State ===
In January 2014, Ash was hired as the co-defensive coordinator and secondary coach for the Ohio State Buckeyes.

=== Rutgers ===
On December 7, 2015, Ash agreed to a 5-year, $11 million-guaranteed contract to become the head coach at Rutgers. He was fired as Rutgers head coach on September 29, 2019, due to poor performance.

=== Texas ===
Ash spent the rest of the 2019 season as an analyst at the University of Texas at Austin.

On December 15, 2019, Ash was hired as the defensive coordinator at Texas there he spent the 2020 season.

=== Jacksonville Jaguars ===
On February 11, 2021, Ash was hired by the Jacksonville Jaguars as their defensive backs and safeties coach under head coach Urban Meyer. Meyer was later fired after Week 14 due to a 2-11 start, allegations of player abuse, and various other problems. Ash was not retained after the conclusion of the season.

=== Las Vegas Raiders ===
On February 6, 2022, Ash was hired by the Las Vegas Raiders as their defensive backs coach under head coach Josh McDaniels. On January 20, a day after Pierce was given the head coach job, Ash was not retained by new Las Vegas Raiders coach Antonio Pierce.

=== Notre Dame ===
After spending a season as an NFL scout for the Jaguars, Ash was hired to take over as defensive coordinator for Notre Dame after the departure of Al Golden.

== Head coaching record ==
=== College ===
Year	Team	Overall	Conference	Standing	Bowl/playoffs
Rutgers Scarlet Knights (Big Ten Conference) (2016–2019)
2016	Rutgers	2–10	0–9	7th (East)	
2017	Rutgers	4–8	3–6	5th (East)	
2018	Rutgers	1–11	0–9	7th (East)	
2019	Rutgers	1–3*	0–2	(East)	
Rutgers:		8–32	3–26		
Total:		8–32			

^{*} Ash was fired mid-season on September 29, 2019.

== Personal life ==
A native of Ottumwa, Iowa, Ash is married to his wife, Doreen. They have four children: Tanner, Jacey, Brady and Alexis.
