= Wrestling at the 2018 Summer Youth Olympics – Boys' freestyle 55 kg =

Boys' freestyle 55kg at the III Summer Youth Olympic Games
- Venue: Asia Pavilion
- Date: 14 October 2018
- Competitors: 6 from 6 nations

Medalists
| 1st place, gold medalist(s) | | Robert Howard; United States |
| 2nd place, silver medalist(s) | | David Almendra; Argentina |
| 3rd place, bronze medalist(s) | | Vladyslav Ostapenko; Ukraine |

The boys' freestyle 55 kg competition at the 2018 Summer Youth Olympics was held on 14 October, at the Asia Pavilion.

== Competition format ==
As there were less than six wrestlers in a weight category, the pool phase will be run as a single group competing in a round-robin format. Ranking within the groups is used to determine the pairings for the final phase.

== Schedule ==
All times are in local time (UTC-3).

| Date | Time | Round |
|---|---|---|
| Sunday, 14 October 2018 | 10:05; 10:30; 10:55; 17:15 | Round 1 Round 2 Round 3 Finals |

== Results ==
Legend

- F — Won by fall

Group Stages

| Qualified for the Gold-medal match |
| Qualified for the Bronze-medal match |
| Qualified for the 5th/6th Place Match |

Group A

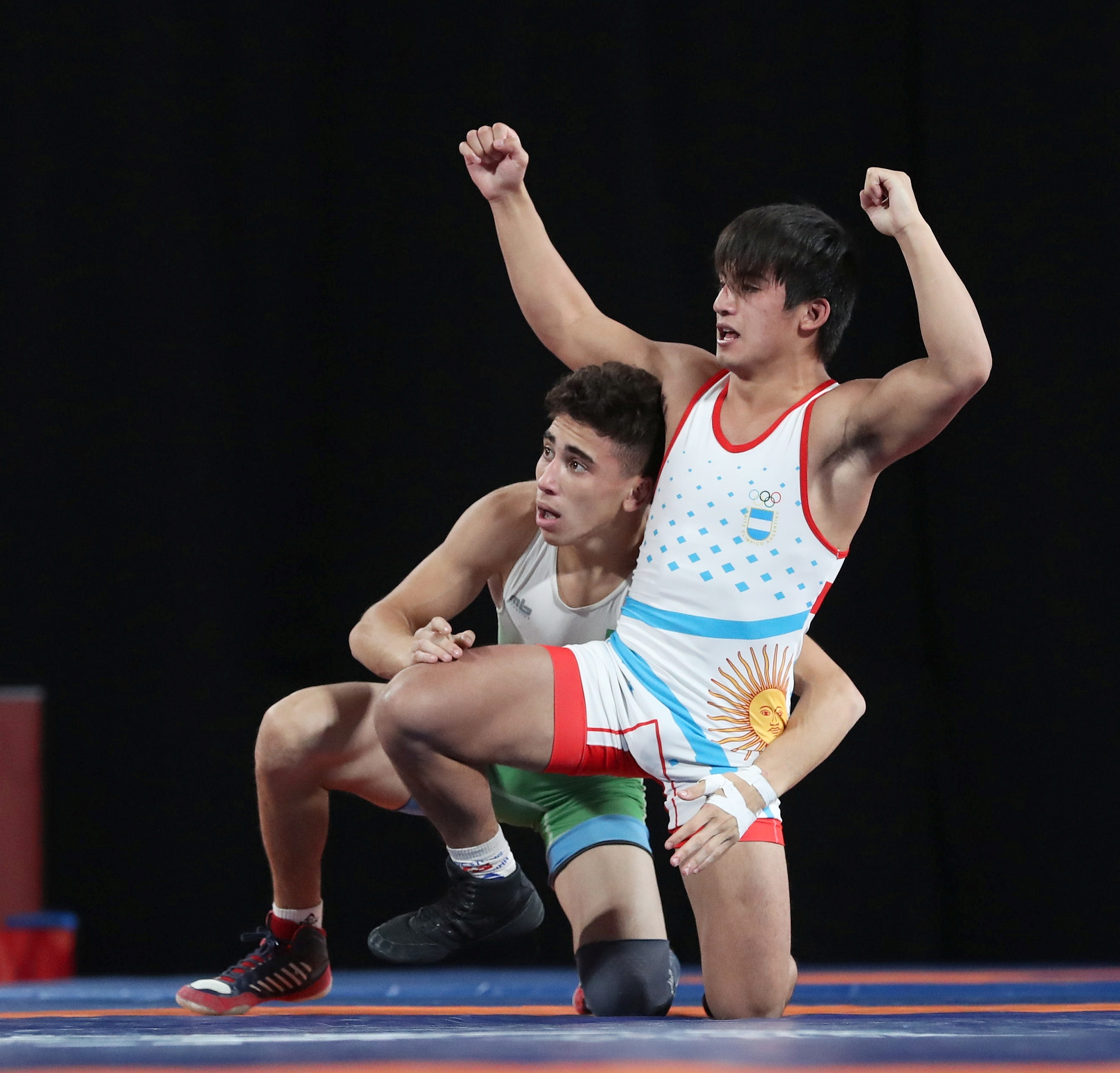
David Almendra vs. Oussama Laribi

| Pos | Athlete | Pld | W | L | CP | TP | Qualification |
|---|---|---|---|---|---|---|---|
| 1 | David Almendra (ARG) | 2 | 2 | 0 | 8 | 9 | Gold-medal match |
| 2 | Oussama Laribi (ALG) | 2 | 1 | 1 | 5 | 14 | Bronze-medal match |
| 3 | Gavin Whitt (GUM) | 2 | 0 | 2 | 0 | 0 | Classification 5th/6th place match |

Source: UWW

| | Score | | CP |
|---|---|---|---|
| Gavin Whitt (GUM) | 0–10 | Oussama Laribi (ALG) | 0–4 VSU |
| David Almendra (ARG) | 4–0 Fall | Gavin Whitt (GUM) | 5–0 VFA |
| Oussama Laribi (ALG) | 4–5 | David Almendra (ARG) | 1–3 VPO1 |

Group B

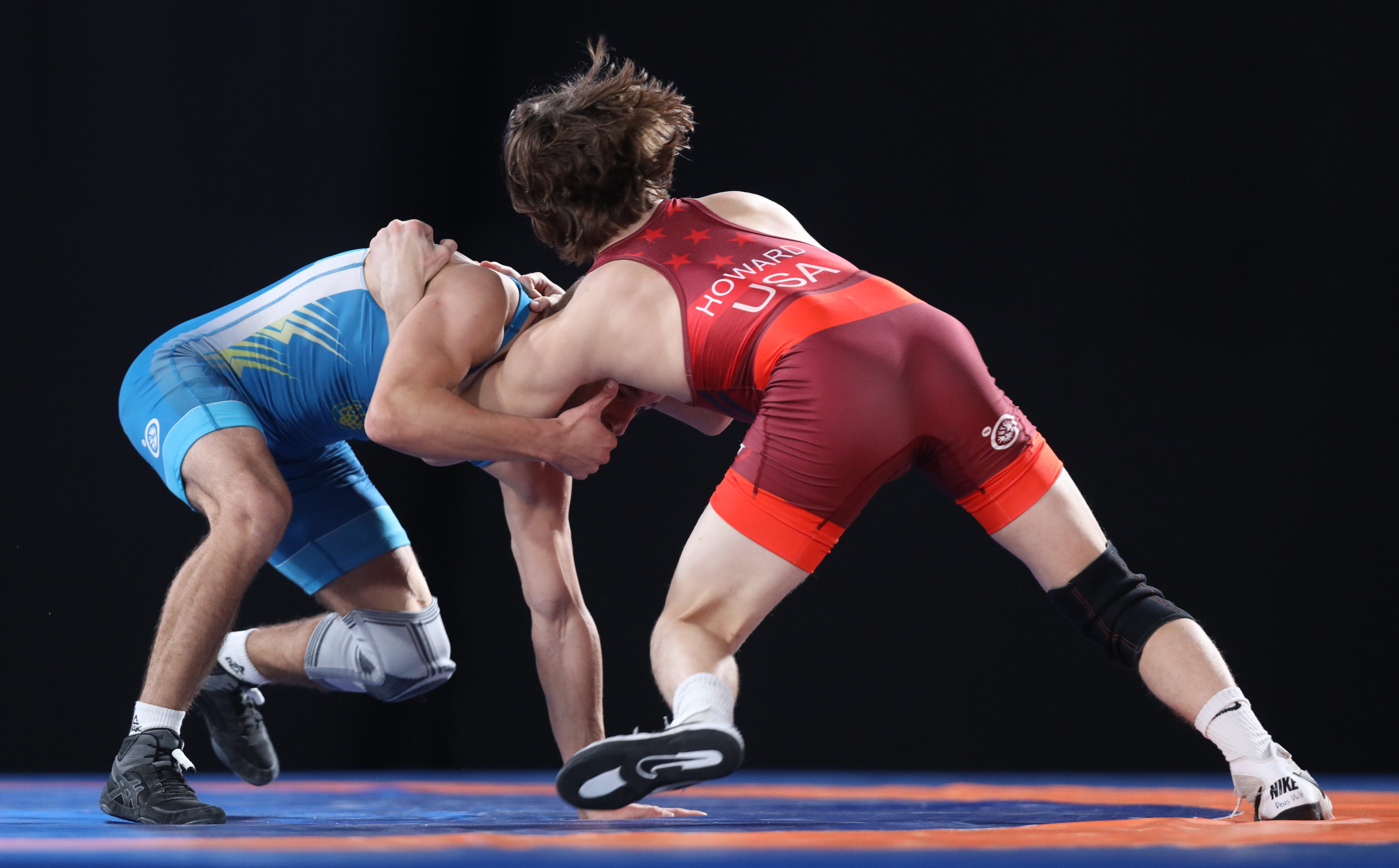
Robert Howard vs. Vladyslav Ostapenko

| Pos | Athlete | Pld | W | L | CP | TP | Qualification |
|---|---|---|---|---|---|---|---|
| 1 | Robert Howard (USA) | 2 | 2 | 0 | 7 | 23 | Gold-medal match |
| 2 | Vladyslav Ostapenko (UKR) | 2 | 1 | 1 | 4 | 15 | Bronze-medal match |
| 3 | Hayato Fujita (JPN) | 2 | 0 | 2 | 2 | 6 | Classification 5th/6th place match |

Source: UWW

| | Score | | CP |
|---|---|---|---|
| Hayato Fujita (JPN) | 4–10 | Vladyslav Ostapenko (UKR) | 1–3 VPO1 |
| Robert Howard (USA) | 13–2 | Hayato Fujita (JPN) | 4–1 VSU1 |
| Vladyslav Ostapenko (UKR) | 5–10 | Robert Howard (USA) | 1–3 VPO1 |

=== Finals ===
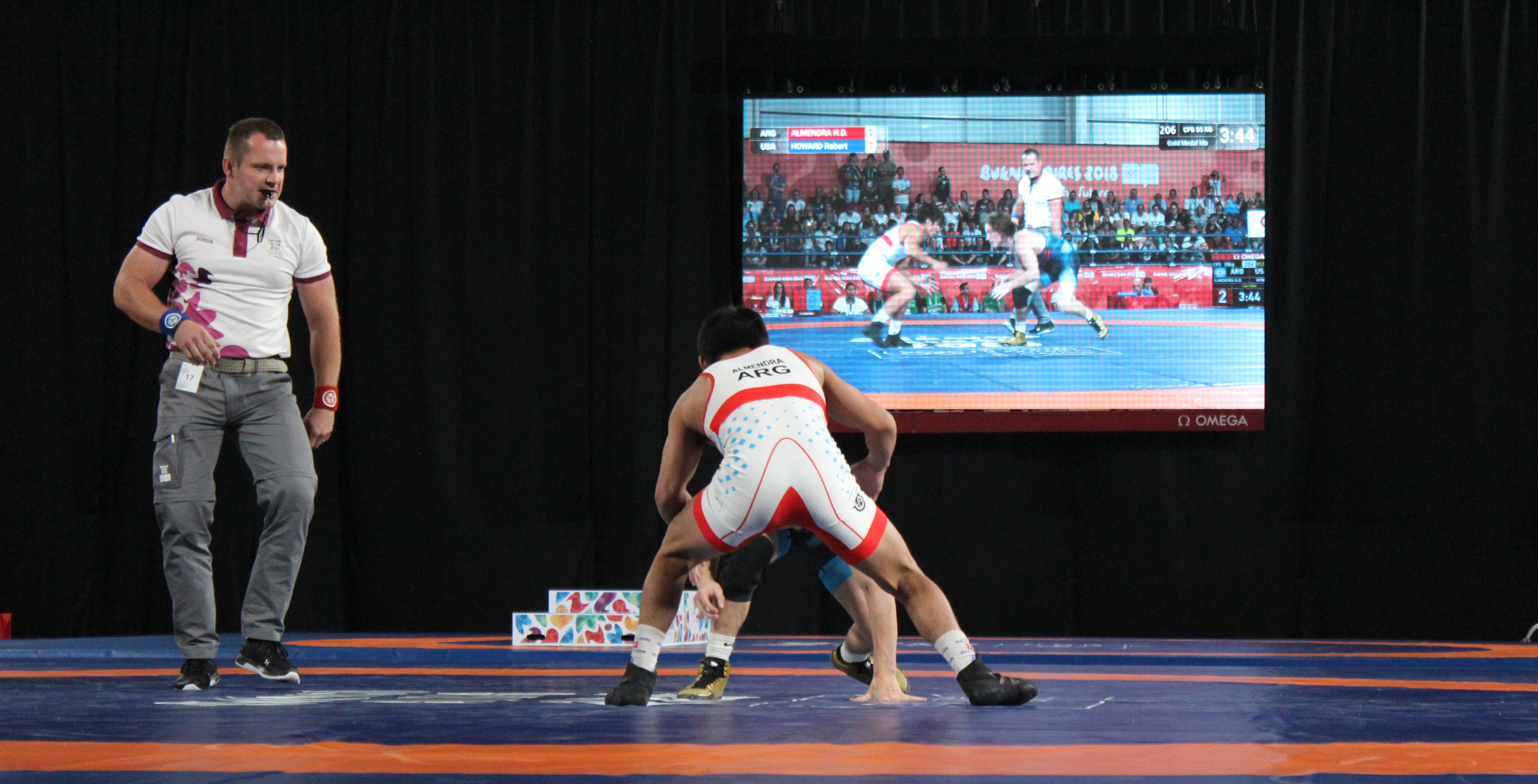
David Almendra vs. Robert Howard

| Gold-medal match |
| David Almendra (ARG) | 6 |
| Robert Howard (USA) | 17 |

| Bronze-medal match |
| Oussama Laribi (ALG) | 0 |
| Vladyslav Ostapenko (UKR) | 10 |

| Classification 5th/6th place match |
| Gavin Whitt (GUM) | 0 |
| Hayato Fujita (JPN) | 10 |

== Final rankings ==
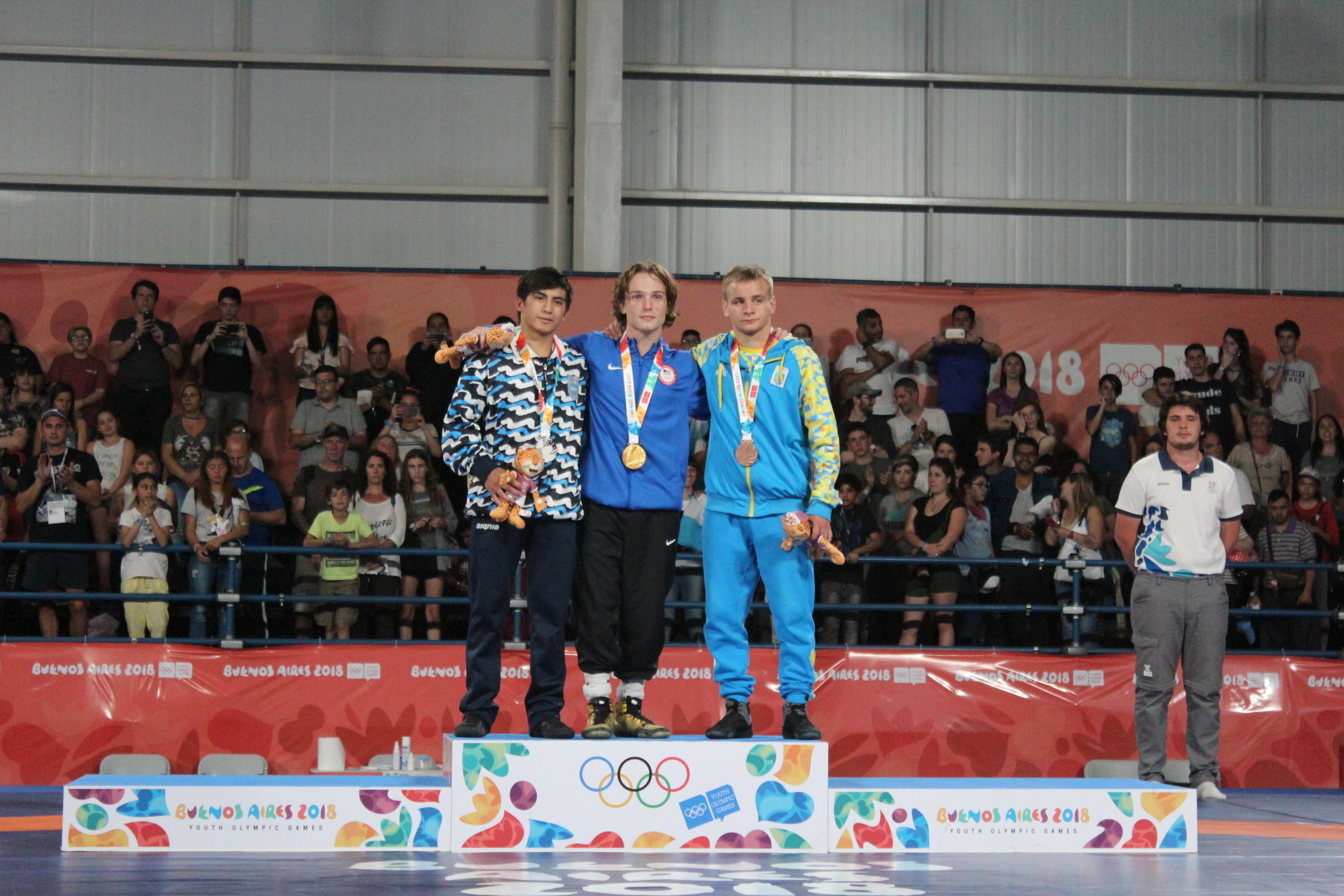
Medal ceremony

| Rank | Athlete |
|---|---|
| 1st place, gold medalist(s) | Robert Howard (USA) |
| 2nd place, silver medalist(s) | David Almendra (ARG) |
| 3rd place, bronze medalist(s) | Vladyslav Ostapenko (UKR) |
| 4 | Oussama Laribi (ALG) |
| 5 | Hayato Fujita (JPN) |
| 6 | Gavin Whitt (GUM) |
