= Damien Alford =

Canadian gridiron football player (born 2001)

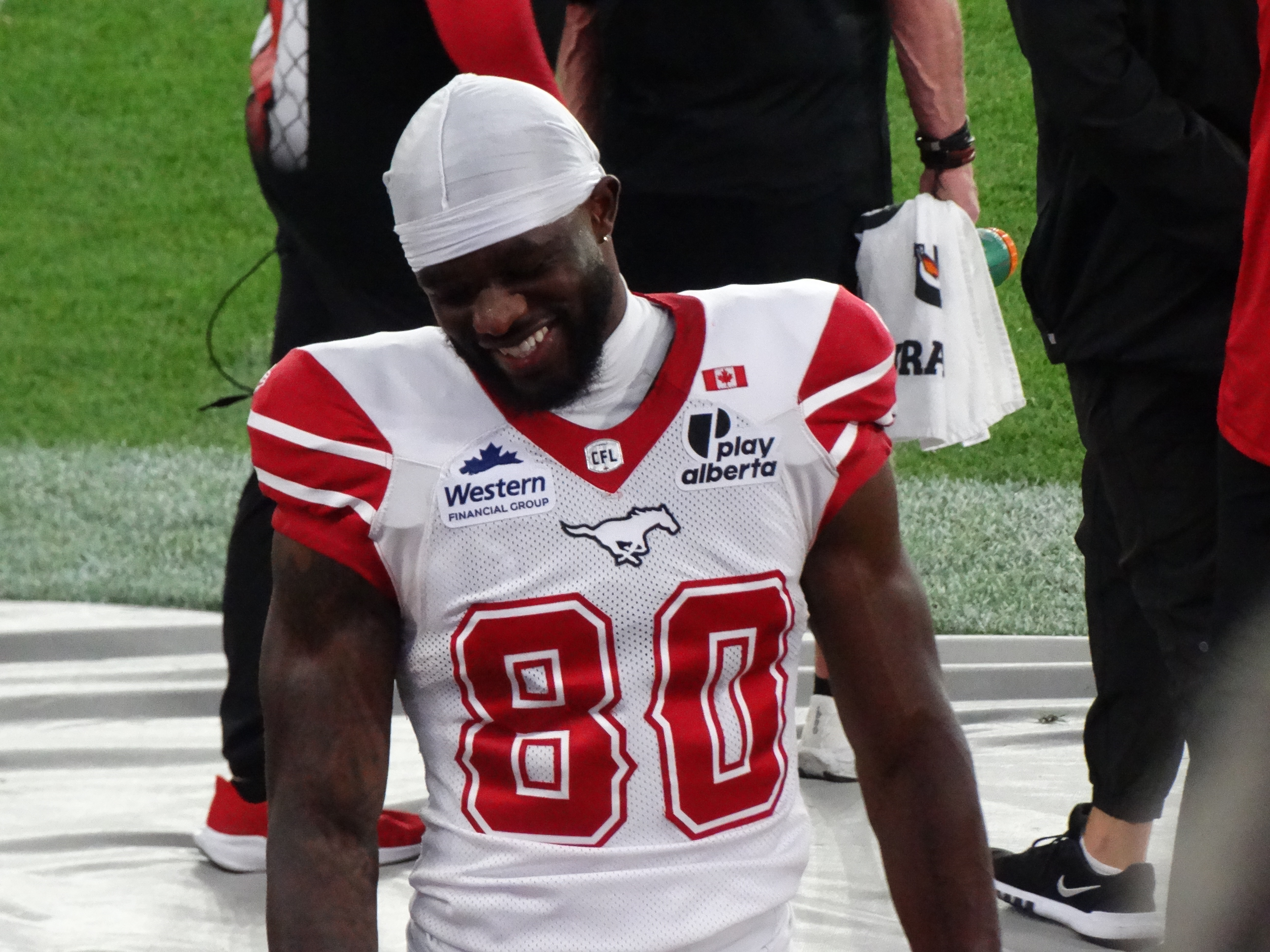
- Alford with the Calgary Stampeders in 2026

No. 80 – Calgary Stampeders
- Position: Wide receiver
- Roster status: Active
- CFL status: National

Personal information
- Born: April 6, 2001 (age 25); Montreal, Quebec, Canada
- Listed height: 6 ft 6 in (1.98 m)
- Listed weight: 224 lb (102 kg)

Career information
- High school: Dalbé-Viau Secondary; McArthur (Hollywood, Florida, U.S.)
- College: Syracuse (2020–2023); Utah (2024)
- NFL draft: 2025: undrafted
- CFL draft: 2025: 1st round, 1st overall pick

Career history
- Calgary Stampeders (2025); New Orleans Saints (2026)*; Calgary Stampeders (2026–present)
- * Offseason or practice squad member only

Career CFL statistics as of 2026
- Games played: 26
- Receptions: 33
- Receiving yards: 587
- Receiving touchdowns: 6
- Stats at CFL.ca

Damien Austin Alford (born April 6, 2001) is a Canadian professional football wide receiver for the Calgary Stampeders of the Canadian Football League (CFL). He was the first overall pick in the 2025 CFL draft.

== College career ==
Alford played college football for the Syracuse Orange from 2020 to 2023. He played in 42 games where he had 67 catches for 1,291 yards and seven touchdowns. He then transferred to the University of Utah in 2024 where he played in four games for the Utes, but did not record any statistics. He announced that he would transfer to Florida Atlantic.

== Professional career ==
Pre-draft measurables
Height	Weight
6 ft 5 1/8 in (1.96 m)	215 lb (98 kg)
Values from Pro Day

In the final Canadian Football League's Amateur Scouting Bureau rankings for players eligible for the 2025 CFL draft, Alford was listed as the seventh-best player available.

=== Calgary Stampeders (first stint) ===
Alford was drafted first overall by the Calgary Stampeders in the draft and signed with the team on May 6, 2025. After spending the first game of the 2025 season on the injured list, he made his professional debut on June 14, against the Toronto Argonauts, where he had one catch for 31 yards.

=== New Orleans Saints ===
On January 6, 2026, Alford signed a reserve/futures contract with the New Orleans Saints. He was waived with an injury designation on June 17.

=== Calgary Stampeders (second stint) ===
On July 22, 2026, it was announced that Alford had signed with the Calgary Stampeders.

== Personal life ==
Alford has three siblings and grew up in Montreal.
