= John McNulty (American football) =

American football player and coach (born 1968)

Current position
- Title: Quarterbacks Coach
- Team: Michigan State Spartans

Biographical details
- Born: May 29, 1968 (age 58); Clarks Summit, Pennsylvania, U.S.

Playing career
- 1988–1990: Penn State
- Position: Safety

Coaching career (HC unless noted)
- 1991–1994: Michigan (GA)
- 1995–1997: Connecticut (WR/ST)
- 1998–2000: Jacksonville Jaguars (OQC)
- 2000–2002: Jacksonville Jaguars (WR)
- 2003: Dallas Cowboys (WR)
- 2004–2005: Rutgers (WR)
- 2006: Rutgers (co-OC/QB)
- 2007–2008: Rutgers (OC/QB)
- 2009–2011: Arizona Cardinals (WR)
- 2012: Arizona Cardinals (QB)
- 2013: Tampa Bay Buccaneers (QB)
- 2014–2015: Tennessee Titans (QB)
- 2016–2017: San Diego / Los Angeles Chargers (TE)
- 2018–2019: Rutgers (OC/QB)
- 2019: Penn State (OA)
- 2020–2021: Notre Dame (TE)
- 2022: Boston College (OC)
- 2023–2024: Alabama (Analyst)
- 2025: Rutgers (Senior Offensive Assistant)
- 2026–present: Michigan State (QB)

John Jeffrey McNulty (born May 29, 1968) is an American football coach who currently serves as Quarterbacks coach for Michigan State. He is a former player and graduate of the Penn State University. McNulty returned to Rutgers, where he spent five seasons as an assistant coach and offensive coordinator from 2004 to 2008. The veteran coach also spent 15 seasons in the National Football League (NFL), coaching for six different teams.

== Early life ==
A native of Clarks Summit, Pennsylvania, McNulty is a 1986 graduate of Abington Heights High School.

== College playing career ==
McNulty was a walk-on 3rd string as a safety at Pennsylvania State University.

== Coaching career ==
=== Early coaching career ===
McNulty began his coaching career as a graduate assistant with the wide receivers at the University of Michigan in 1991. Michigan won two Big Ten titles and appeared in four bowl games including two Rose Bowl appearances during his time in Ann Arbor. In 1994, McNulty worked with standout wide receivers and future NFL players Amani Toomer and Mercury Hayes. McNulty spent three seasons (1995–97) at Connecticut working with wide receivers and special teams. At UConn, McNulty helped wide receiver Carl Bond earn Division I-AA All-America honors in 1997. McNulty spent six seasons in the NFL, the first five in Jacksonville as an offensive quality control coach (1998–2000) and wide receivers coach (2000–02). In Jacksonville, McNulty worked with one of the NFL's top receiving tandems in Jimmy Smith and Keenan McCardell. In 2002, Smith had 80 receptions for 1,027 yards, his seventh consecutive 1,000-yard receiving season. McNulty helped Jacksonville to playoff appearances in 1998 (11–5 record) and in 1999 (14–2 record). McNulty then spent the 2003 season with the Dallas Cowboys as the wide receivers coach as the Cowboys went 10-6 and earned a playoff berth.

=== Rutgers ===
From 2004 to 2008, McNulty spent five seasons with the Rutgers Scarlet Knights and head coach Greg Schiano. His first two seasons with the team were spent as wide receivers coach before being promoted to assistant offensive coordinator/quarterbacks coach for a year and finally offensive coordinator/quarterbacks coach for his final two seasons with the Scarlet Knights.

=== Arizona Cardinals ===
Prior to joining Tampa Bay, McNulty spent four seasons (2009–12) with the Arizona Cardinals, three (2009–11) as the wide receivers coach and one (2012) as quarterbacks coach. Under his direction, WR Larry Fitzgerald was selected to three Pro Bowls and earned two All-Pro selections (2009, 2011). Fitzgerald also led the NFL in touchdown receptions (13) in 2010 and became the franchise leader in receiving yards, receiving touchdowns and 100-yard games during their time together.

=== Tampa Bay Buccaneers ===
In 2013, the Tampa Bay Buccaneers and head coach Greg Schiano, hired McNulty to coach the quarterbacks. With the Buccaneers, McNulty guided rookie QB Mike Glennon to rookie franchise marks for passing yards and touchdowns. Furthermore, Glennon registered the top passer rating (82.0) among NFL rookies in 2013 and was named to the Pro Football Writers of America All-Rookie team.

=== Tennessee Titans ===
In 2014, McNulty was reunited with head coach Ken Whisenhunt as the Tennessee Titans quarterbacks' coach. Last season, McNulty saw three different quarterbacks start at least five games due to injuries. Jake Locker started the season, Charlie Whitehurst started five games and rookie Zach Mettenberger started six games during the middle of the season. Mettenberger reached a number of highs during the season, including the rookie franchise mark for passing yards in a game (345 at Philadelphia), the highest franchise passer rating for a rookie season (83.4), highest passing yardage total by any rookie on Monday Night Football (263) and the second-highest passer rating among the 2014 rookie class of quarterbacks.

=== Rutgers ===
In 2018, McNulty replaced Jerry Kill as the offensive coordinator for the Rutgers Scarlet Knights and head coach Chris Ash.

=== Notre Dame ===
In 2020, after spending a year as an offensive analyst with the Penn State football team, McNulty was hired by Notre Dame as the tight ends coach, replacing offensive coordinator Chip Long, who also served as the tight ends coach.

=== Boston College ===
In 2022, McNulty was targeted by Jeff Hafley to be the next offensive coordinator of the Boston College Eagles.

== Personal ==
A native of Pennsylvania, McNulty and his wife, Kim, have four daughters: Abigail, Allison, Megan and Kaitlyn.
