= 2023 Indiana Hoosiers football team =

American college football season

2023 Indiana Hoosiers football
- Conference: Big Ten Conference
- Record: 3–9 (1–8 Big Ten)
- Head coach: Tom Allen (7th season)
- Offensive coordinator: Walt Bell (2nd season; first 5 game); Rod Carey (interim; final 7 games)
- Offensive scheme: Option
- Defensive coordinator: Chad Wilt (2nd season)
- Co-defensive coordinator: Matt Guerrieri (1st season)
- Base defense: Multiple 4–2–5
- Captains: Noah Pierre; Cam Camper; Andre Carter; Aaron Casey; Mike Katic
- Home stadium: Memorial Stadium

2023 Big Ten Conference football standings
	Conf.			Overall
Team	W		L	W		L
East Division
No. 1 Michigan xy$#^	9	–	0	15	–	0
No. 10 Ohio State	8	–	1	11	–	2
No. 13 Penn State	7	–	2	10	–	3
Maryland	4	–	5	8	–	5
Rutgers	3	–	6	7	–	6
Indiana	1	–	8	3	–	9
Michigan State†	0	–	7	0	–	8
West Division
No. 24 Iowa xy	7	–	2	10	–	4
Northwestern	5	–	4	8	–	5
Wisconsin	5	–	4	7	–	6
Minnesota	3	–	6	6	–	7
Illinois	3	–	6	5	–	7
Nebraska	3	–	6	5	–	7
Purdue	3	–	6	4	–	8
Championship: Michigan 26, Iowa 0
# – College Football Playoff champion; ^ – College Football Playoff participant; $ – Conference champion; x – Division champion/co-champions; y – Championship game participant; † — NCAA vacated all wins for Michigan State (4–8, 2–7); Rankings from AP Poll

The 2023 Indiana Hoosiers football team represented Indiana University in the 2023 NCAA Division I FBS football season. The Hoosiers were led by seventh-year head coach Tom Allen. They played their home games at Memorial Stadium in Bloomington, Indiana, as members of the Big Ten Conference. Allen was fired at the conclusion of the season. As of 2026, this season marks the last time Indiana finished with a losing record.

== Offseason ==
=== Coaching changes ===
Following the end of the 2022 season, Indiana released six-year veteran offensive line coach Darren Hiller; Hiller had been a part of the Hoosiers' two recent bowl appearances in 2019 and 2020 On December 2, 2022, Indiana hired Wisconsin Badgers offensive line coach Bob Bostad to replace the outgoing Hiller; Bostad had coached the Badgers' offensive line during both the 2017 Orange Bowl and the 2020 Rose Bowl.

== Schedule ==
Date	Time	Opponent	Site	TV	Result	Attendance
September 2	3:30 p.m.	No. 3 Ohio State	Memorial Stadium; Bloomington, IN	CBS	L 3–23	50,050
September 8	7:00 p.m.	Indiana State*	Memorial Stadium; Bloomington, IN	BTN	W 41–7	42,775
September 16	12:00 p.m.	vs. Louisville*	Lucas Oil Stadium; Indianapolis, IN	BTN	L 14–21	37,250
September 23	7:30 p.m.	Akron*	Memorial Stadium; Bloomington, IN	BTN	W 29–27 ^{4OT}	44,968
September 30	3:30 p.m.	at Maryland	SECU Stadium; College Park, MD	BTN	L 17–44	38,181
October 14	12:00 p.m.	at No. 2 Michigan	Michigan Stadium; Ann Arbor, MI	FOX	L 7–52	110,264
October 21	12:00 p.m.	Rutgers^{†}	Memorial Stadium; Bloomington, IN	BTN	L 14–31	43,611
October 28	12:00 p.m.	at No. 10 Penn State	Beaver Stadium; University Park, PA	CBS	L 24–33	107,209
November 4	12:00 p.m.	Wisconsin	Memorial Stadium; Bloomington, IN	BTN	W 20–14	45,466
November 11	12:00 p.m.	at Illinois	Memorial Stadium; Champaign, IL (rivalry)	BTN	L 45–48 ^{OT}	53,157
November 18	12:00 p.m.	Michigan State	Memorial Stadium; Bloomington, IN (rivalry)	BTN	L 21–24	40,666
November 25	12:00 p.m.	at Purdue	Ross–Ade Stadium; West Lafayette, IN (Old Oaken Bucket)	BTN	L 31–35	59,993
*Non-conference game; ^{†}Homecoming; Rankings from AP and CFP Rankings, after November 1 released prior to game; All times are in Eastern time

== Game summaries ==
=== vs No. 3 Ohio State ===
No. 3 Ohio State Buckeyes (0–0) vs Indiana Hoosiers (0–0) – Game summary

Quarter	1	2	3	4	Total
No. 3 Buckeyes	7	3	10	3	23
Hoosiers	0	3	0	0	3

at Memorial Stadium • Bloomington, Indiana

- Date: September 2nd
- Game time: 3:30 p.m. EST
- Game weather: Temperature: 86 °F (30 °C) • Wind: SW at 5 miles per hour (8.0 km/h) • Weather: Sunny
- Game attendance: 50,050
- Referee: Bryan Banks
- TV announcers (CBS): Brad Nessler (play-by-play), Gary Danielson (analyst), and Jenny Dell (sideline)

Game information

First quarter

- OSU – Miyan Williams 7-yard run (Jayden Fielding kick), 7:16. Buckeyes 7–0. Drive: 11 plays, 80 yards, 5:34.

Second quarter

- IU – Chris Freeman 42-yard field goal, 6:15. Buckeyes 7–3. Drive: 8 plays, 43 yards, 4:03.
- OSU – Jayden Fielding 40-yard field goal, 0:03. Buckeyes 10–3. Drive: 6 plays, 35 yards, 0:35.

Third quarter

- OSU – Jayden Fielding 22-yard field goal, 6:42. Buckeyes 13–3. Drive: 11 plays, 76 yards, 5:24.
- OSU – Miyan Williams 3-yard run (Jayden Fielding kick), 1:51. Buckeyes 20–3. Drive: 6 plays, 88 yards, 3:24.

Fourth quarter

- OSU – Jayden Fielding 22-yard field goal, 4:26. Buckeyes 23–3. Drive: 14 plays, 54 yards, 5:41.

Statistics	Ohio State	Indiana
First downs	23	10
Plays–yards	67–380	54–153
Rushes–yards	31–143	33–71
Passing yards	237	82
Passing: comp–att–int	21–36–1	9–21–0
Turnovers		
Time of possession	31:55	28:05

Team	Category	Player	Statistics
Ohio State	Passing	Kyle McCord	20/33, 239 yards, 1 INT
Ohio State	Rushing	Chip Trayanum	8 carries, 57 yards
Ohio State	Receiving	Cade Stover	5 receptions, 98 yards
Indiana	Passing	Brendan Sorsby	8/16, 58 yards
Indiana	Rushing	Christian Turner	7 carries, 29 yards
Indiana	Receiving	Cam Camper	3 receptions, 35 yards

=== vs Indiana State ===
Indiana State Sycamores (0–1) vs Indiana Hoosiers (0–1) – Game summary

Quarter	1	2	3	4	Total
Sycamores	0	7	0	0	7
Hoosiers	21	3	7	10	41

at Memorial Stadium • Bloomington, Indiana

- Date: September 8th
- Game time: 7:00 p.m. EST
- Game weather: 71 °F (22 °C) • Wind: NW at 7 miles per hour (11 km/h) • Weather: Cloudy
- Game attendance: 42,775
- Referee: Ron Snodgrass
- TV announcers (BTN): Pat Boylan (play-by-play), Brock Vereen (analyst), Meghan McKeown (sideline)

Game information

First quarter

- IU – Jaylin Lucas 25-yard run (Chris Freeman kick), 12:04. Hoosiers 7–0. Drive: 4 plays, 73 yards, 1:18.
- IU – Jaylin Lucas 25-yard run (Chris Freeman kick), 8:52. Hoosiers 14–0. Drive: 6 plays, 81 yards, 2:17.
- IU – Tayven Jackson 10-yard run (Chris Freeman kick), 2:04. Hoosiers 21–0. Drive: 9 plays, 71 yards, 4:38.

Second quarter

- ISU – Maddix Blackwell 75-yard fumble return (Stephen Ruiz kick), 2:00. Hoosiers 21–7. Drive: 8 plays, 55 yards, 4:05.
- IU – Chris Freeman 28-yard field goal, 0:17. Hoosiers 24–7. Drive: 10 plays, 42 yards, 1:39.

Third quarter

- IU – Christian Turner 1-yard run (Nico Radicic kick), 1:39. Hoosiers 31–7. Drive: 13 plays, 93 yards, 6:03.

Fourth quarter

- IU – Josh Henderson 3-yard run (Nico Radicic kick), 10:50. Hoosiers 38–7. Drive: 7 plays, 45 yards, 4:03.
- IU – Nico Radicic 21-yard field goal, 2:43. Hoosiers 41–7. Drive: 15 plays, 74 yards, 7:07.

Statistics	Indiana State	Indiana
First downs	8	33
Plays–yards	43–93	79–558
Rushes–yards	32–72	42–214
Passing yards	21	344
Passing: comp–att–int	3–11–1	27–37–0
Turnovers		
Time of possession	23:11	36:49

Team	Category	Player	Statistics
Indiana State	Passing	Evan Olaes	3/9, 21 yards
Indiana State	Rushing	Korbin Allen	5 carries, 24 yards
Indiana State	Receiving	Harry Van Dyne	1 reception, 15 yards
Indiana	Passing	Tayven Jackson	18/21, 236 yards
Indiana	Rushing	Jaylin Lucas	10 carries, 88 yards, 2 TD
Indiana	Receiving	Omar Cooper Jr.	7 receptions, 101 yards

=== vs Louisville ===
Louisville Cardinals (2–0) vs Indiana Hoosiers (1–1) – Game summary

Quarter	1	2	3	4	Total
Cardinals	7	14	0	0	21
Hoosiers	0	0	14	0	14

at Lucas Oil Stadium • Indianapolis, Indiana

- Date: September 16th
- Game time: 12:00 p.m. EST
- Game weather: Sunny
- Game attendance: 37,250
- Referee: Stuart Mullins
- TV announcers (BTN): Connor Onion (play-by-play), Brock Vereen (analyst), Meghan McKeown (sideline)

Game information

First quarter

- LOU – Jamari Thrash 85-yard pass from Jack Plummer (Brock Travelstead kick), 2:34. Cardinals 7–0. Drive: 2 plays, 85 yards, 0:15.

Second quarter

- LOU – Maurice Turner Thrash 2-yard run (Brock Travelstead kick), 7:44. Cardinals 14–0. Drive: 13 plays, 78 yards, 6:26.
- LOU – Jawhar Jordan 25-yard run (Brock Travelstead kick), 1:52. Cardinals 21–0. Drive: 7 plays, 69 yards, 2:18.

Third quarter

- IU – Jaylin Lucas 30-yard pass from Tayven Jackson (Chris Freeman kick), 13:46. Cardinals 21–7. Drive: 3 plays, 54 yards, 1:14.
- IU – Josh Henderson 2-yard run (Nico Radicic kick), 0:55. Cardinals 21–14. Drive: 13 plays, 97 yards, 7:27.

Fourth quarter

- No scoring plays.

Statistics	Louisville	Indiana
First downs	19	20
Plays–yards	52–422	61–357
Rushes–yards	39–184	27–58
Passing yards	238	299
Passing: comp–att–int	13–23–1	24–34–1
Turnovers		
Time of possession	28:48	31:12

Team	Category	Player	Statistics
Louisville	Passing	Jack Plummer	13/23, 238 yards, 1 TD 1 INT
Louisville	Rushing	Jawhar Jordan	18 carries, 113 yards, 1 TD
Louisville	Receiving	Jamari Thrash	4 receptions, 159 yards, 1 TD
Indiana	Passing	Tayven Jackson	24/34, 299 yards, 1 TD, 1 INT
Indiana	Rushing	Jaylin Lucas	8 carries, 29 yards
Indiana	Receiving	Jaylin Lucas	10 receptions, 98 yards, 1 TD

=== vs Akron ===
Akron Zips (1–2) vs Indiana Hoosiers (1–2) – Game summary

Quarter	1	2	3	4	OT	Total
Zips	0	3	7	7	10	27
Hoosiers	0	7	7	3	12	29

at Memorial Stadium • Bloomington, Indiana

- Date: September 23rd
- Game time: 7:30 p.m. EST
- Game weather: 75 °F (24 °C) • Wind: NW at 7 miles per hour (11 km/h) • Weather: Sunny
- Game attendance: 44,968
- Referee: Kole Knueppel
- TV announcers (BTN): Connor Onion (play-by-play), Adam Breneman (analyst), Dannie Rodgers (sideline)

Game information

First quarter

- No scoring plays

Second quarter

- IU – Christian Turner 6-yard run (Chris Freeman kick), 10:01. Hoosiers 7–0. Drive: 6 plays, 80 yards, 3:29.
- AKR – Dante Jackson 25-yard field goal, 1:51. Hoosiers 7–3. Drive: 6 plays, 17 yards, 2:50.

Third quarter

- AKR – DJ Irons 14-yard run (Dante Jackson kick), 10:33. Hoosiers 10–7. Drive: 9 plays, 74 yards, 4:21
- IU – Louis Moore 22-yard interception return (Chris Freeman kick), 6:56. Hoosiers 14–10.

Fourth quarter

- IU – Chris Freeman 19-yard field goal, 8:05. Hoosiers 17–10. Drive: 11 plays, 72 yards, 5:08.
- AKR – Lorenzo Lingard 71-yard run (Dante Jackson kick), 3:34. Tied 17–17. Drive: 2 plays, 80 yards, 0:43.

Overtime

- AKR – DJ Irons 10-yard run (Dante Jackson kick). Zips 24–17. Drive: 5 plays, 25 yards.
- IU – Cam Camper 12-yard pass from Tayven Jackson (Chris Freeman kick). Tied 24–24. Drive: 3 plays, 25 yards.

2nd Overtime

- IU – Chris Freeman 39-yard field goal. Hoosiers 27–24. Drive: 4 plays, 4 yards.
- AKR – Dante Jackson 23-yard field goal. Tied 27–27. Drive: 6 plays, 20 yards.

3rd Overtime

- No scoring plays.

4th Overtime

- IU – Tayven Jackson pass to DeQuece Carter for two-point conversion. Hoosiers 29–27.

Statistics	Akron	Indiana
First downs	24	14
Plays–yards	84–474	60–282
Rushes–yards	40–263	34–92
Passing yards	211	190
Passing: comp–att–int	26–44–3	11–26–1
Turnovers		
Time of possession	34:24	25:36

Team	Category	Player	Statistics
Akron	Passing	DJ Irons	22/35, 194 yards, 2 INT
Akron	Rushing	DJ Irons	18 carries, 141 yards, 2 TD
Akron	Receiving	Alex Adams	5 receptions, 63 yards
Indiana	Passing	Tayven Jackson	11/26, 190 yards, 1 TD, 1 INT
Indiana	Rushing	Christian Turner	13 carries, 67 yards, 1 TD
Indiana	Receiving	Cam Camper	4 receptions, 103 yards, 1 TD

=== at Maryland ===
Indiana Hoosiers (2–2) vs Maryland Terrapins (4–0) – Game summary

Quarter	1	2	3	4	Total
Hoosiers	3	0	0	14	17
Terrapins	21	6	10	7	44

at SECU Stadium • College Park, Maryland

- Date: September 30th
- Game time: 3:30 p.m. EST
- Game weather: Temperature: 73 °F (23 °C) • Wind: NE at 7 miles per hour (11 km/h) • Weather: Cloudy
- Game attendance: 38,181
- Referee: Jerry McGinn
- TV announcers (BTN): Connor Onion (play-by-play), Matt Millen (analyst), Elise Menaker (sideline)

Game information

First quarter

- UMD – Tai Felton 13-yard pass from Taulia Tagovailoa (Jack Howes kick), 14:35. Terrapins 7–0. Drive: 3 plays, 73 yards, 0:25.
- IND – Chris Freeman 25-yard field goal, 9:54. Terrapins 7–3. Drive: 8 plays, 32 yards, 4:31.
- UMD – Tai Felton 13-yard pass from Taulia Tagovailoa (Jack Howes kick), 5:34. Terrapins 14–3. Drive: 1 play, 29 yards, 0:05.
- UMD – Taulia Tagovailoa 19-yard run (Jack Howes kick), 2:43. Terrapins 21–3. Drive: 2 plays, 21 yards, 0:46.

Second quarter

- UMD – Tai Felton 9-yard pass from Taulia Tagovailoa (Jack Howes PAT failed), 0:36. Terrapins 27–3. Drive: 5 plays, 50 yards, 0:26.

Third quarter

- UMD – Jack Howes 25-yard field goal, 11:23. Terrapins 30–3. Drive: 4 plays, 6 yards, 2:04.
- UMD – Dylan Wade 3-yard pass from Taulia Tagovailoa (Jack Howes kick), 7:08. Terrapins 37–3. Drive: 5 play, 71 yards, 1:31.

Fourth quarter

- IU – Donaven McCulley 11-yard pass from Brendan Sorsby (Chris Freeman kick), 11:07. Terrapins 37–10. Drive: 7 plays, 47 yards, 3:30.
- UMD – Kaden Prather 14-yard pass from Taulia Tagovailoa (Jack Howes kick), 6:54. Terrapins 44–10. Drive: 9 play, 75 yards, 4:13.
- UMD – Andison Coby 16-yard pass from Brendan Sorsby (Chris Freeman kick), 0:25. Terrapins 44–17. Drive: 14 plays, 75 yards, 6:29.

Statistics	Indiana	Maryland
First downs	20	20
Plays–yards	78–321	57–472
Rushes–yards	37–116	23–120
Passing yards	205	352
Passing: comp–att–int	25–41–1	24–34–0
Turnovers		
Time of possession	38:04	21:56

Team	Category	Player	Statistics
Indiana	Passing	Tayven Jackson	17/29, 113 yards, 1 INT
Indiana	Rushing	Christian Turner	15 carries, 61 yards
Indiana	Receiving	Donaven McCulley	6 receptions, 79 yards, 1 TD
Maryland	Passing	Taulia Tagovailoa	24/34 352 yards, 5 TD
Maryland	Rushing	Roman Hemby	14 carries, 54 yards
Maryland	Receiving	Tai Felton	7 receptions, 134 yards, 3 TD

=== vs No. 2 Michigan ===
Indiana Hoosiers (2–3) vs No. 2 Michigan Wolverines (6–0) – Game summary

Quarter	1	2	3	4	Total
Hoosiers	7	0	0	0	7
No. 2 Wolverines	0	21	17	14	52

at Michigan Stadium • Ann Arbor, Michigan

- Date: October 14th
- Game time: 12:00 p.m. EST
- Game weather: Temperature: 49 °F (9 °C) • Wind: NE at 12 miles per hour (19 km/h) • Weather: Rain
- Game attendance: 110,264
- Referee: Tom O'Dey
- TV announcers (FOX): Gus Johnson (play-by-play), Joel Klatt (analyst), Jenny Taft (sideline)

Game information

First quarter

- IU – Jaylin Lucas 44-yard pass from Donaven McCulley (Chris Freeman kick), 2:17. Hoosiers 7–0. Drive: 7 plays, 77 yards, 2:51.

Second quarter

- MICH – Blake Corum 1-yard run (James Turner kick), 11:19. Tied 7–7. Drive: 11 plays, 77 yards, 5:54.
- MICH – Roman Wilson 2-yard pass from J. J. McCarthy (James Turner kick), 3:24. Wolverines 14–7. Drive: 11 plays, 87 yards, 5:29.
- MICH – Blake Corum 1-yard run (James Turner kick), 0:11. Wolverines 21–7. Drive: 6 plays, 46 yards, 1:29.

Third quarter

- MICH – Colston Loveland 54-yard pass from J. J. McCarthy (James Turner kick), 12:22. Wolverines 28–7. Drive: 4 plays, 65 yards, 2:31.
- MICH – Semaj Morgan 7-yard pass from J. J. McCarthy (James Turner kick), 8:28. Wolverines 35–7. Drive: 5 plays, 52 yards, 2:18.
- MICH – James Turner 28-yard field goal, 5:18. Wolverines 38–7. Drive: 4 plays, 5 yards, 2:20.

Fourth quarter

- MICH – Donovan Edwards 2-yard run (James Turner kick), 12:02. Wolverines 45–7. Drive: 8 plays, 51 yards, 3:47.
- MICH – Karmello English 7-yard pass from Jack Tuttle (James Turner kick), 6:03. Wolverines 52–7. Drive: 9 plays, 36 yards, 5:43.

Statistics	Indiana	Michigan
First downs	15	23
Plays–yards	62–232	64–407
Rushes–yards	33–92	42–163
Passing yards	140	244
Passing: comp–att–int	14–29–2	19–22–0
Turnovers		
Time of possession	27:13	32:47

Team	Category	Player	Statistics
Indiana	Passing	Tayven Jackson	7/13, 52 yards, 2 INT
Indiana	Rushing	Trent Howland	5 carries, 35 yards
Indiana	Receiving	Jaylin Lucas	5 receptions, 56 yards, 1 TD
Michigan	Passing	J. J. McCarthy	14/17, 222 yards, 3 TD
Michigan	Rushing	Benjamin Hall	9 carries, 58 yards
Michigan	Receiving	Colston Loveland	3 receptions, 80 yards, 1 TD

=== vs Rutgers ===
Rutgers Scarlet Knights (5–2) vs Indiana Hoosiers (2–4) – Game summary

Quarter	1	2	3	4	Total
Scarlet Knights	7	10	7	7	31
Hoosiers	7	7	0	0	14

at Memorial Stadium • Bloomington, Indiana

- Date: October 21st
- Game time: 12:00 p.m. EST
- Game weather: 61 °F (16 °C) • Wind: SW at 9 miles per hour (14 km/h) • Weather: Sunny
- Game attendance: 43,611
- Referee: Jeffrey Servinski
- TV announcers (BTN): Connor Onion (play-by-play), Matt Millen (analyst), Elise Menaker (sideline)

Game information

First quarter

- IU – Omar Cooper Jr. 35-yard pass from Brendan Sorsby (Chris Freeman kick), 11:28. Hoosiers 7–0. Drive: 9 plays, 75 yards, 3:52.
- RUTG – Gavin Wimsatt 1-yard run (Jai Patel kick), 3:19. Tied 7–7. Drive: 15 plays, 75 yards, 8:09.

Second quarter

- RUTG – Eric Rogers 17-yard return of blocked punt (Jai Patel kick), 14:53. Scarlet Knights 14–7.
- IND – Brendan Sorsby 4-yard run (Chris Freeman kick), 3:59. Tied 14–14. Drive: 4 plays, 59 yards, 1:25.
- RUTG – Jai Patel 21-yard field goal, 0:00. Scarlet Knights 17–14. Drive: 6 plays, 17 yards, 0:28.

Third quarter

- RUTG – Gavin Wimsatt 1-yard run (Jai Patel kick), 8:45. Scarlet Knights 24–14. Drive: 12 plays, 75 yards, 6:15.

Fourth quarter

- RUTG – Gavin Wimsatt 80-yard run (Jai Patel kick), 13:11. Scarlet Knights 31–14. Drive: 2 plays, 85 yards, 1:03.

Statistics	Rutgers	Indiana
First downs	20	18
Plays–yards	67–315	60–279
Rushes–yards	55–276	29–153
Passing yards	39	126
Passing: comp–att–int	4–11–0	15–31–1
Turnovers		
Time of possession	37:38	22:22

Team	Category	Player	Statistics
Rutgers	Passing	Gavin Wimsatt	5/12, 39 yards
Rutgers	Rushing	Gavin Wimsatt	16 carries, 143 yards, 3 TD
Rutgers	Receiving	Christian Dremel	2 receptions, 14 yards
Indiana	Passing	Brendan Sorsby	15/31, 126 yards, 1 TD
Indiana	Rushing	Trent Howland	9 carries, 54 yards
Indiana	Receiving	Omar Cooper Jr.	1 reception, 35 yards, 1 TD

=== at No. 10 Penn State ===
Indiana Hoosiers (2–5) vs Penn State Nittany Lions (6–1) – Game summary

Quarter	1	2	3	4	Total
Hoosiers	7	7	0	10	24
No. 10 Nittany Lions	7	10	7	9	33

at Beaver Stadium • University Park, Pennsylvania

- Date: October 28th
- Game time: 12:00 p.m. EST
- Game weather: 69 °F (21 °C) • Wind: W at 8 miles per hour (13 km/h) • Weather: Cloudy
- Game attendance: 107,209
- Referee: Kole Knueppel
- TV announcers (CBS): Tom McCarthy (play-by-play), Devin McCourty (analyst), and Tiffany Blackmon (sideline)

Game information

First quarter

- IU – DeQuece Carter 90-yard pass from Brendan Sorsby (Chris Freeman kick), 7:37. Hoosiers 7–0. Drive: 1 play, 90 yards, 0:12.
- PSU – Khalil Dinkins 9-yard pass from Drew Allar (Alex Fenkins kick), 1:37. Tied 7–7. Drive: 7 plays, 26 yards, 4:21.

Second quarter

- IU – Donaven McCulley 69-yard pass from Brendan Sorsby (Chris Freeman kick), 13:26. Hoosiers 14–7. Drive: 1 play, 69 yards, 0:09.
- PSU – Nicholas Singleton 2-yard run (Alex Felkins kick), 2:09. Tied 14–14. Drive: 9 plays, 59 yards, 4:57.
- PSU – Alex Felkins 50-yard field goal, 0:00. Nittany Lions 17–14. Drive: 7 plays, 11 yards, 1:01.

Third quarter

- PSU – Theo Johnson 16-yard pass from Drew Allar (Alex Fenkins kick), 1:37. Nittany Lions 24–14. Drive: 12 plays, 75 yards, 6:21.

Fourth quarter

- IU – Omar Cooper Jr. 35-yard pass from Brendan Sorsby (Chris Freeman kick), 10:54. Nittany Lions 24–21. Drive: 12 plays, 85 yards, 5:20.
- IU – Chris Freeman 35-yard field goal, 2:58. Tied 24–24. Drive: 4 plays, 4 yards, 2:04.
- PSU – KeAndre Lambert-Smith 9-yard pass from Drew Allar (Alex Fenkins kick), 1:46. Nittany Lions 31–24. Drive: 3 plays, 78 yards, 1:12.
- PSU – Team Safety, 1:33. Nittany Lions 33–24.

Statistics	Indiana	Penn State
First downs	14	19
Plays–yards	53–349	74–342
Rushes–yards	34–80	43–132
Passing yards	269	210
Passing: comp–att–int	13–19–1	20–31–1
Turnovers		
Time of possession	24:41	35:19

Team	Category	Player	Statistics
Indiana	Passing	Brendan Sorsby	13/19, 269 yards, 3 TD, 1 INT
Indiana	Rushing	Josh Henderson	12 carries, 57 yards
Indiana	Receiving	DeQuece Carter	3 receptions, 104 yards, 1 TD
Penn State	Passing	Drew Allar	20/31, 210 yards, 3 TD, 1 INT
Penn State	Rushing	Kaytron Allen	18 carries, 81 yards
Penn State	Receiving	KeAndre Lambert-Smith	6 receptions, 96 yards, 1 TD

=== vs Wisconsin ===
Wisconsin Badgers (5–3) vs Indiana Hoosiers (2–6) – Game summary

Quarter	1	2	3	4	Total
Badgers	0	7	7	0	14
Hoosiers	7	10	0	3	20

at Memorial Stadium • Bloomington, Indiana

- Date: November 4th
- Game time: 12:00 p.m EST
- Game weather: 55 °F (13 °C) • Wind: SW at 7 miles per hour (11 km/h) • Weather: Cloudy
- Game attendance: 45,466
- Referee: Mark Kluczynski
- TV announcers (BTN): Cory Provus (play-by-play), Jake Butt (analyst), Brooke Fletcher (sideline)

Game information

First quarter

- IU – Brendan Sorsby 8-yard run (Chris Freeman kick), 9:59. Hoosiers 7–0. Drive: 9 plays, 55 yards, 4:53.

Second quarter

- IU – Chris Freeman 27-yard field goal, 8:08. Hoosiers 10–0. Drive: 9 plays, 33 yards, 3:12.
- WISC – Bryson Green 35-yard pass from Braedyn Locke (Nathanial Vakos kick), 4:11. Hoosiers 10–7. Drive: 5 plays, 68 yards, 1:50.
- IU – Donaven McCulley 7-yard pass from Brendan Sorsby (Chris Freeman kick), 0:41. Hoosiers 17–7. Drive: 9 plays, 71 yards, 3:24.

Third quarter

- WISC – Will Pauling 18-yard pass from Braedyn Locke (Nathanial Vakos kick), 10:14. Hoosiers 17–14. Drive: 10 plays, 75 yards, 1:50.

Fourth quarter

- IU – Chris Freeman 50-yard field goal, 1:10. Hoosiers 20–14. Drive: 8 plays, 36 yards, 2:57.

Statistics	Wisconsin	Indiana
First downs	18	20
Plays–yards	71–344	72–261
Rushes–yards	28–101	41–75
Passing yards	203	186
Passing: comp–att–int	21–43–0	19–31–0
Turnovers		
Time of possession	25:35	33:25

Team	Category	Player	Statistics
Wisconsin	Passing	Braedyn Locke	21/41, 243 yards, 2 TD
Wisconsin	Rushing	Jackson Acker	11 carries, 48 yards
Wisconsin	Receiving	Bryson Green	4 receptions, 96 yards, 1 TD
Indiana	Passing	Brendan Sorsby	19/31, 186 yards, 1 TD
Indiana	Rushing	Josh Henderson	15 carries, 40 yards
Indiana	Receiving	Donaven McCulley	5 receptions, 67 yards, 1 TD

=== at Illinois ===
Indiana Hoosiers (3–6) vs Illinois Fighting Illini (4–5) – Game summary

Quarter	1	2	3	4	OT	Total
Hoosiers	7	20	0	15	3	45
Fighting Illini	9	17	7	9	6	48

at Memorial Stadium • Champaign, Illinois

- Date: November 11th
- Game time: 12:00 p.m EST
- Game weather: 46 °F (8 °C) • Wind: SE at 6 miles per hour (9.7 km/h) • Weather: Sunny
- Game attendance: 53,157
- Referee: Tim O'Day
- TV announcers (BTN): Connor Onion (play-by-play), Matt Millen (analyst), Elise Menaker (sideline)

Game information

First quarter

- ILL – Caleb Griffin 24-yard field goal, 8:59. Fighting Illini 3–0. Drive: 10 plays, 71 yards, 4:16.
- IU – Trent Howland 1-yard run (Chris Freeman kick), 3:54. Hoosiers 7–3. Drive: 9 plays, 32 yards, 3:40.
- ILL – Reggie Love III 8-yard run (Caleb Griffin PAT failed), 3:19. Fighting Illini 9–7. Drive: 2 plays, 75 yards, 0:35.

Second quarter

- IU – Donaven McCulley 6-yard pass from Brendan Sorsby (Chris Freeman kick), 14:32. Hoosiers 14–9. Drive: 7 plays, 74 yards, 3:41.
- ILL – Caleb Griffin 27-yard field goal, 11:24. Hoosiers 14–12. Drive: 7 plays, 64 yards, 3:03.
- IU – Donaven McCulley 6-yard pass from Brendan Sorsby (Chris Freeman kick), 8:22. Hoosiers 21–12. Drive: 6 plays, 69 yards, 2:52.
- IU – Brendan Sorsby 18-yard run (Chris Freeman PAT blocked), 3:54. Hoosiers 27–12. Drive: 4 plays, 52 yards, 2:01.
- ILL – Casey Washington 20-yard pass from John Paddock (Caleb Griffin kick), 3:05. Hoosiers 27–19. Drive: 5 plays, 92 yards, 2:28.
- ILL – Pat Bryant 13-yard pass from John Paddock (Caleb Griffin kick), 0:18. Hoosiers 27–26. Drive: 6 plays, 73 yards, 1:14.

Third quarter

- ILL – Isaiah Williams 42-yard pass from John Paddock (Caleb Griffin kick), 5:18. Fighting Illini 33–27. Drive: 5 plays, 86 yards, 2:00.

Fourth quarter

- ILL – Reggie Love III 37-yard run (pass failed), 14:53. Fighting Illini 39–27. Drive: 7 plays, 81 yards, 3:32.
- IU – Brendan Sorsby 5-yard run (Chris Freeman kick), 12:25. Fighting Illini 39–34. Drive: 6 plays, 52 yards, 2:17.
- ILL – Caleb Griffin 21-yard field goal, 5:04. Fighting Illini 42–34. Drive: 14 plays, 72 yards, 7:21.
- IU – DeQuece Carter 26-yard pass from Brendan Sorsby (Brendan Sorsby–E.J. Williams Jr. two-point pass), 0:28. Tied 42–42. Drive: 6 plays, 85 yards, 1:09.

Overtime

- IU – Chris Freeman 27-yard field goal. Hoosiers 45–42. Drive: 4 plays, 2 yards.
- ILL – Isaiah Williams 21-yard pass from John Paddock. Fighting Illini 48–45. Drive: 3 plays, 25 yards.

Statistics	Indiana	Illinois
First downs	30	31
Plays–yards	76–451	71–662
Rushes–yards	43–162	35–155
Passing yards	289	507
Passing: comp–att–int	22–33–1	24–36–1
Turnovers		
Time of possession	29:51	30:09

Team	Category	Player	Statistics
Indiana	Passing	Brendan Sorsby	22/33, 289 yards, 3 TD, 1 INT
Indiana	Rushing	Trent Howland	13 carries, 72 yards, 1 TD
Indiana	Receiving	Donaven McCulley	11 receptions, 137 yards, 2 TD
Illinois	Passing	John Paddock	24/36, 507 yards, 4 TD, 1 INT
Illinois	Rushing	Reggie Love III	24 carries, 140 yards, 2 TD
Illinois	Receiving	Isaiah Williams	9 receptions, 200 yards, 2 TD

=== vs Michigan State ===
Michigan State Spartans (3–7) vs Indiana Hoosiers (3–7) – Game summary

Quarter	1	2	3	4	Total
Spartans	7	7	0	10	24
Hoosiers	0	7	7	7	21

at Memorial Stadium • Bloomington, Indiana

- Date: November 18th
- Game time: 12:00 p.m EST
- Game weather: 51 °F (11 °C) • Wind: NW at 6 miles per hour (9.7 km/h) • Weather: Sunny
- Game attendance: 40,666
- Referee: Jeffrey Servinski
- TV announcers (BTN): Jason Ross Jr. (play-by-play), Anthony Herron (analyst), Megan McKeown (sideline)

Game information

First quarter

- MSU – Maliq Carr 17-yard pass from Katin Houser (Jonathan Kim kick), 11:09. Spartans 7–0. Drive: 9 plays, 62 yards, 3:44.

Second quarter

- IU – Trent Howland 4-yard run (Chris Freeman kick), 9:29. Tied 7–7. Drive: 11 plays, 88 yards, 4:16.
- MSU – Maliq Carr 29-yard pass from Katin Houser (Jonathan Kim kick), 1:10. Spartans 14–7. Drive: 8 plays, 78 yards, 1:13.

Third quarter

- IU – James Bomba 3-yard pass from Brendan Sorsby (Chris Freeman kick), 10:54. Tied 14–14. Drive: 8 plays, 75 yards, 4:06.

Fourth quarter

- MSU – Jonathan Kim 36-yard field goal, 9:26. Spartans 17–14. Drive: 7 plays, 32 yards, 3:09.
- IU – Trey Walker 3-yard pass from Brendan Sorsby (Chris Freeman kick), 4:06. Hoosiers 21–17. Drive: 11 plays, 75 yards, 5:20.
- MSU – Maliq Carr 36-yard pass from Katin Houser (Jonathan Kim kick), 1:19. Spartans 24–21. Drive: 8 plays, 75 yards, 2:47.

Statistics	Michigan State	Indiana
First downs	22	23
Plays–yards	75–317	80–402
Rushes–yards	34–72	46–210
Passing yards	245	402
Passing: comp–att–int	26–41–2	19–34–0
Turnovers		
Time of possession	31:04	28:56

Team	Category	Player	Statistics
Michigan State	Passing	Katin Houser	26/41, 245 yards, 3 TD, 2 INT
Michigan State	Rushing	Nate Carter	11 carries, 42 yards
Michigan State	Receiving	Maliq Carr	9 receptions, 100 yards, 2 TD
Indiana	Passing	Brendan Sorsby	19/34, 192 yards, 2 TD
Indiana	Rushing	Trent Howland	19 carries, 77 yards, 1 TD
Indiana	Receiving	Donaven McCulley	3 receptions, 72 yards

=== at Purdue ===
Indiana Hoosiers (3–8) vs Purdue Boilermakers (3–8) – Game summary

Quarter	1	2	3	4	Total
Hoosiers	7	7	14	3	31
Boilermakers	0	12	6	17	35

at Ross-Ade Stadium • West Lafayette, Indiana

- Date: November 25th
- Game time: 12:00 p.m. EST
- Game weather: 36 °F (2 °C) • Wind: E at 4 miles per hour (6.4 km/h) • Weather: Cloudy
- Game attendance: 59,993
- Referee: Jerry McGinn
- TV announcers (BTN): Chris Vosters (play-by-play), Brock Vereen (analyst), Megan McKeown (sideline)

Game information

First quarter

- IU – DeQuece Carter 33-yard pass from Brendan Sorsby (Chris Freeman kick), 0:34. Hoosiers 7–0. Drive: 5 plays, 72 yards, 1:59.

Second quarter

- PUR – George Burhenn 33-yard pass from Hudson Card (run failed), 12:07. Hoosiers 7–6. Drive: 7 plays, 66 yards, 3:20.
- IU – Donaven McCulley 10-yard pass from Brendan Sorsby (Chris Freeman kick), 8:59. Hoosiers 14–6. Drive: 8 plays, 49 yards, 2:58.
- PUR – Drew Biber 16-yard pass from Hudson Card (pass failed), 0:12. Hoosiers 14–12. Drive: 12 plays, 78 yards, 2:34.

Third quarter

- PUR – Ben Freehill 33-yard field goal, 13:14. Boilermakers 15–14. Drive: 7 plays, 29 yards, 1:36.
- IU – Jaylin Lucas 100-yard kickoff return (Chris Freeman kick), 13:02. Hoosiers 21–15.
- PUR – Ben Freehill 44-yard field goal, 10:37. Hoosiers 21–18. Drive: 7 plays, 53 yards, 2:21.
- IU – Josh Henderson 9-yard pass from Brendan Sorsby (Chris Freeman kick), 1:43. Hoosiers 28–18. Drive: 8 plays, 87 yards, 3:15.

Fourth quarter

- PUR – Devin Mockobee 38-yard pass from Hudson Card (Ben Freehill kick), 14:53. Hoosiers 28–25. Drive: 6 plays, 63 yards, 1:43.
- PUR – Ben Freehill 35-yard field goal, 8:41. Tied 28–28. Drive: 11 plays, 52 yards, 4:55.
- IU – Chris Freeman 35-yard field goal, 5:09. Hoosiers 31–28. Drive: 7 plays, 49 yards, 3:26.
- PUR – Hudson Card 10-yard run (Chris Freeman kick), 2:39. Boilermakers 35–31. Drive: 5 plays, 65 yards, 2:30.

Statistics	Indiana	Purdue
First downs	22	25
Plays–yards	66–359	81–453
Rushes–yards	35–133	47–178
Passing yards	226	275
Passing: comp–att–int	17–31–3	21–34–0
Turnovers		
Time of possession	26:59	33:01

Team	Category	Player	Statistics
Indiana	Passing	Brendan Sorsby	17/31, 226 yards, 3 TD, 3 INT
Indiana	Rushing	Josh Henderson	9 carries, 44 yards
Indiana	Receiving	E.J. Williams Jr.	6 receptions, 97 yards
Purdue	Passing	Hudson Card	21/34, 275 yards, 3 TD
Purdue	Rushing	Hudson Card	12 carries, 85 yards, 1 TD
Purdue	Receiving	Deion Burks	7 receptions, 87 yards

== Roster ==
2023 Indiana Hoosiers football team roster
Players
Coaches
Offense

Pos.	#	Name	Class
WR	0	Andison Coby	Jr
WR	1	Donaven McCulley	Jr
QB	2	Tayven Jackson	Fr
WR	3	Omar Cooper Jr.	Fr
WR	4	DeQuece Carter	Sr
QB	5	Dexter Williams II (injured)	So
WR	6	Cam Camper (injured)	Sr
WR	7	E.J. Williams	Sr
WR	8	Jaquez Smith	So
WR	10	Derin McCulley	Jr
RB	12	Jaylin Lucas	So
WR	13	Kamryn Perry	Fr
QB	14	Broc Lowry	Fr
QB	15	Brendan Sorsby	Fr
QB	18	Blaze McKibbin	Jr
QB	19	Roman Purcell	So
WR	24	Jackson Wasserstrom	Fr
RB	25	Daniel Weems	So
RB	26	Josh Henderson	Sr
RB	27	Trent Howland	So
RB	28	Christian Turner	Sr
WR	29	Reece Bellin	Fr
RB	33	David Holloman	So
RB	36	Reece Lozano	Fr
RB	37	Declan McMahon	Fr
TE	39	Bryce Hendershot	Fr
TE	45	Trey Walker	Sr
TE	48	James Bomba	So
TE	49	Zac Scott	Sr
OL	50	Zach Carpenter	Sr
OL	53	Vincent Fiacable	So
OL	54	Jack Greer	Fr
OL	56	Mike Katic	Sr
OL	61	Garrett Brown	Fr
OL	62	Drew Evans	Fr
OL	63	Josh Witt	So
OL	65	Carter Smith	Fr
OL	67	Kahlil Benson	Jr
OL	68	Robby Kowalewski	Fr
OL	70	Bubba Jeffries	Fr
OL	71	Will Larkins	Fr
OL	73	Austin Barrett	Fr
OL	74	Bray Lynch	Fr
OL	76	Matthew Bedford	Sr
OL	77	Joshua Sales Jr.	So
OL	79	Max Williams	Fr
WR	80	Derrick Bohler	Fr
WR	81	Brady Simmons	Fr
TE	82	Bradley Archer	Sr
WR	83	Eli Jochem	So
TE	84	Aaron Steinfeldt	So
TE	85	Anthony Miller Jr.	Fr
TE	86	Brody Foley	Fr
TE	88	Sam West	Fr
WR	89	Camden Jordan	So

Defense

Pos.	#	Name	Class
DB	0	Noah Pierre	Sr
DL	1	Andre Carter	Sr
DB	2	James Monds III	Fr
DB	3	JoJo Johnson	So
OLB	4	Anthony Jones	Fr
DB	5	Kobee Minor	Jr
DB	6	Phillip Dunnam	So
LB	7	Jacob Mangum-Farrar	Sr
LB	8	Jared Casey	Sr
DB	9	Jamier Johnson	Jr
OLB	10	Myles Jackson	Sr
LB	14	Kaiden Turner	Fr
DB	15	Nic Toomer	Jr
DB	16	Jordan Grier	Jr
DB	17	Tyrik McDaniel	Jr
OLB	18	Andrew Turvy	So
DB	19	Josh Sanguinetti	Sr
DB	20	Louis Moore	Sr
DB	22	Jamari Sharpe	Fr
DB	23	Jordan Shaw	Fr
DB	24	Bryson Bonds	Jr
DB	25	Amare Ferrell	Fr
LB	26	Joshua Rudolph	Jr
LB	27	Xavier Trueblood	Jr
DB	29	Jaz Boykin	Fr
DB	29	Luke Haupert	Fr
DB	30	Mitchell Evans	Fr
DB	31	Anthony Chung	Fr
DB	33	Connor Hole	Jr
LB	34	Jeff Utzinger	Fr
DB	35	Aaron Stewart	Fr
DB	36	Clay Conner	Fr
OLB	37	Jackson Schott	So
DB	38	Drew Pearce	So
OLB	40	Orlando Greenlow (injured)	Fr
OLB	41	Lanell Carr Jr.	Sr
LB	42	Darryl Minor Jr.	Sr
LB	43	Matt Hohlt	So
LB	44	Aaron Casey	Sr
LB	45	Lincoln Murff	Sr
LB	46	Isaiah Jones	Fr
OLB	47	Finn Walters	Fr
LB	48	Sam Tallen	Fr
DL	51	Patrick Lucas Jr.	Sr
LB	52	Clayton Allen	Fr
DL	55	Venson Sneed Jr.	Fr
DL	57	Julian Kameristy	So
DL	58	Aden Cannon	Fr
DL	60	Dalton Davis	Jr
DL	64	Race Stewart	So
DL	69	Carl Biddings IV	Fr
DL	90	J'mari Monette	Fr
DL	91	LeDarrius Cox	Sr
DL	92	Marcus Burris Jr.	So
DL	93	Robby Harrison	Fr
DL	96	Phillip Blidi	Sr
DL	98	Trey Laing (injured)	Sr
DL	99	Nick James	Fr

Special teams

Pos.	#	Name	Class
K	39	Nico Radicic	Fr
K	80	Chris Freeman	Jr
P	94	James Evans	Jr
LS	95	Sean Wracher	Sr
P	96	Alejandro Quintero	So
LS	97	Jaxon Miller	Fr

Head coach

- Tom Allen

Coordinators/assistant coaches

- Craig Johnson (assistant head coach / running backs)
- Brandon Shelby (assistant head coach / cornerbacks)
- Rod Carey (offensive coordinator / quarterbacks)
- Bob Bostad (run game coordinator / offensive line)
- Matt Guerrieri (co-defensive coordinator / safeties)
- Paul Randolph (defensive line)
- Kasey Teegardin (special teams coordinator / outside linebackers)
- Anthony Tucker (co-offensive coordinator / wide receivers)
- Chad Wilt (defensive coordinator / linebackers)
- Kevin Wright (tight ends)

Legend

- (C) Team captain
- (S) Suspended
- (I) Ineligible
- Injured
- Redshirt

Roster
Last update: November 13, 2023

== Statistics ==
=== Team ===
	Indiana	Opp
Points per game	22.2	29.9
Total	266	359
First downs	237	253
Rushing	89	108
Passing	122	123
Penalty	26	22
Rushing yards	1780	2160
Avg per play	3.4	4.2
Avg per game	120.9	155.3
Rushing touchdowns	13	18
Passing yards	2553	2856
Att-Comp-Int	367-215-10	365-222-10
Avg per pass	7.0	7.8
Avg per game	212.8	238.0
Passing touchdowns	18	25
Total offense	4004	4719
Avg per play	5.0	5.8
Avg per game	333.7	393.3
Fumbles-Lost	19-8	10-3
Penalties-Yards	65-602	77-706
Avg per game	50.2	58.8
Punts-Yards	58-2612	53-2214
Avg per punt	39.8	40.4
Time of possession/Game	29:26	30:34
3rd down conversions	63-169 (37.3%)	57-158 (36.1%)
4th down conversions	10-27 (37.0%)	10-19 (52.6%)
Touchdowns scored	33	45
Field goals-Attempts	11-15	16-21
PAT-Attempts	31-32	39-41
Attendance	673,590	
Games/Avg per Game	55,132	
Neutral Site	37,250	

=== Individual Leaders ===
==== Offense ====
Passing statistics
#	NAME	POS	RAT	CMP	ATT	YDS	CMP%	TD	INT	LONG
15	Brendan Sorsby	QB	130.0	135	237	1,587	57.0	15	5	90
2	Tayven Jackson	QB	118.3	78	128	914	60.9	2	5	41
1	Donaven McCulley	WR	799.6	1	1	44	100	1	0	44
14	Broc Lowry	QB	167.2	1	1	8	100	0	0	8
	TOTALS		127.8	215	367	2,553	58.6	18	10	90

Rushing statistics
#	NAME	POS	ATT	GAIN	AVG	TD	LONG
27	Trent Howland	RB	75	359	4.7	2	19
26	Josh Henderson	RB	81	346	4.2	2	29
15	Brendan Sorsby	QB	112	477	2.6	4	25
12	Jaylin Lucas	RB	67	302	4.1	2	25
28	Christian Turner	RB	52	231	4.4	2	17
33	David Holloman	RB	6	18	3.0	0	7
4	DeQuece Carter	WR	1	1	1.0	0	1
1	Donaven McCulley	WR	3	-1	-0.3	0	1
13	Kamryn Perry	WR	2	-6	-3.0	0	0
2	Tayven Jackson	QB	28	65	-0.8	1	10
	TOTALS		433	1,780	3.4	13	29

Receiving statistics
#	NAME	POS	CTH	YDS	AVG	TD	LONG
1	Donaven McCulley	WR	48	644	13.4	6	69
4	DeQuece Carter	WR	27	395	14.6	3	90
6	Cam Camper	WR	17	285	16.8	1	41
7	E.J. Williams Jr.	WR	23	281	12.2	0	27
3	Omar Cooper Jr.	WR	18	267	14.8	2	35
12	Jaylin Lucas	RB	34	247	7.3	2	44
26	Josh Henderson	RB	10	125	12.5	1	22
45	Trey Walker	TE	10	81	8.1	1	20
82	Bradley Archer	TE	6	79	13.2	0	24
48	James Bomba	TE	6	53	8.8	1	15
0	Andison Coby	WR	5	41	8.2	1	16
27	Trent Howland	RB	3	22	7.3	0	11
13	Kamryn Perry	WR	3	22	7.3	0	9
84	Aaron Steinfeldt	TE	1	11	11.0	0	11
28	Christian Turner	RB	4	0	0.0	0	3
	TOTALS		227	2,698	11.9	18	90

==== Defense ====
Defense statistics
#	NAME	POS	SOLO	AST	TOT	TFL-YDS	SACK-YDS	INT	BU	QBH	FR	FF
44	Aaron Casey	LB	78	31	109	20.0–82	6.5–44	0	3	1	0	3
20	Louis Moore	DB	59	24	83	1.0–5	0–0	3	1	0	0	3
7	Jacob Mangum-Farrar	LB	33	29	62	4.0–5	0–0	0	4	3	0	0
6	Phillip Dunnam	DB	39	14	53	1.0–4	0–0	3	6	0	0	0
1	Andre Carter	DL	27	12	49	11.0–44	2.0–16	0	3	4	0	0
41	Lanell Carr	OLB	21	12	33	8.5–49	5.0–37	0	2	2	0	0
96	Phillip Blidi	DL	10	20	30	4.0–9	0–0	0	1	2	0	0
5	Kobee Minor	DB	20	9	29	0–0	0–0	0	4	0	0	0
15	Nicolas Toomer	DB	22	4	26	3.0–10	1.0–3	1	3	0	0	0
10	Myles Jackson	OLB	17	8	25	2.0–6	1.0–4	0	0	0	0	1
16	Jordan Grier	DB	18	5	23	1.5–7	0–0	0	0	0	0	0
0	Noah Pierre	DB	16	6	22	1.5–2	1.0–1	0	2	0	0	0
22	Jamari Sharpe	DB	18	4	22	1.0–4	0–0	1	2	0	0	0
92	Marcus Burris Jr.	DL	13	7	20	2.5–3	1.0–1	0	0	0	0	0
19	Josh Sanguinetti	DB	11	8	19	0.5–1	0–0	2	2	0	2	0
26	Joshua Rudolph	LB	13	5	18	2.5–4	0–0	0	1	0	0	0
51	Patrick Lucas Jr.	DL	8	6	14	0.5–1	0–0	0	0	0	0	0
3	JoJo Johnson	DB	6	6	12	0–0	0–0	0	1	0	0	0
4	Anthony Jones	OLB	8	4	12	0.5–7	0.5–7	0	0	1	0	0
23	Jordan Shaw	DB	8	4	12	0.5–7	0.5–7	0	1	1	0	0
91	LeDarrius Cox	DL	7	3	10	2.0–6	0–0	0	0	0	0	0
25	Amare Ferrell	DB	9	0	9	0–0	0–0	0	0	0	0	0
43	Matt Hohlt	LB	4	5	9	0–0	0–0	0	0	0	0	0
9	Jamier Johnson	DB	4	1	5	0–0	0–0	0	1	0	0	0
55	Venson Sneed	DL	3	2	5	1.5–4	0–0	0	0	0	0	1
24	Bryson Bonds	DB	4	0	4	0–0	0–0	0	0	0	0	0
41	Lanell Carr Jr.	OLB	4	0	4	1.0–4	0–0	0	0	0	0	0
99	Nick James	DL	2	2	4	1.0–6	1.0–6	0	1	0	0	0
17	Tyrik McDaniel	DB	3	1	4	0–0	0–0	0	0	0	0	0
2	James Monds III	DB	1	3	4	0–0	0–0	0	0	0	0	0
8	Jared Casey	LB	1	2	3	0–0	0–0	0	0	0	1	0
93	Robby Harrison	DL	1	2	3	0–0	0–0	0	0	0	0	0
76	Matthew Bedford	OL	1	1	2	0–0	0–0	0	0	0	1	0
14	Kaiden Turner	LB	1	1	2	0–0	0–0	0	0	0	0	0
95	Sean Wracher	LS	1	1	2	0–0	0–0	0	0	0	0	0
67	Kahlil Benson	OL	1	0	1	0–0	0–0	0	0	0	0	0
48	James Bomba	TE	0	1	1	0–0	0–0	0	0	0	0	0
94	James Evans	P	1	0	1	0–0	0–0	0	0	0	0	0
80	Chris Freeman	K	1	0	1	0–0	0–0	0	0	0	0	0
56	Mike Katic	OL	1	0	1	0–0	0–0	0	0	0	0	0
21	Jamison Kelly	DB	1	0	1	0–0	0–0	0	0	0	0	0
1	Donaven McCulley	WR	0	1	1	0–0	0–0	0	1	0	0	0
37	Jackson Schott	OLB	0	1	1	0–0	0–0	0	0	0	0	0
15	Brendan Sorsby	QB	1	0	1	0–0	0–0	0	0	0	0	0
64	Race Stewart	DL	1	0	1	1.0–4	1.0–4	0	0	0	0	0
25	Daniel Weems	RB	1	0	1	1.0–2	0–0	0	0	0	0	0
	TOTAL		500	254	754	73.0–270	20.0–123	10	39	14	3	8

Key: POS: Position, SOLO: Solo Tackles, AST: Assisted Tackles, TOT: Total Tackles, TFL: Tackles-for-loss, SACK: Quarterback Sacks, INT: Interceptions, BU: Passes Broken Up, PD: Passes Defended, QBH: Quarterback Hits, FR: Fumbles Recovered, FF: Forced Fumbles

==== Special teams ====
Kicking statistics
#	NAME	POS	XPM	XPA	XP%	FGM	FGA	FG%	1–19	20–29	30–39	40–49	50+	LNG
80	Chris Freeman	K	29	30	96.7	10	14	71.4	1/1	3/3	3/4	2/4	1/2	50
39	Nico Radicic	K	2	2	100	1	1	100	0/0	1/1	0/0	0/0	0/0	21
	TOTALS		31	32	98.3	11	15	73.3	1/1	4/4	3/4	2/4	1/2	50

Punting statistics
#	NAME	POS	PUNTS	YDS	AVG	LONG	TB	I–20	50+	BLK
94	James Evans	P	56	2,553	45.6	70	6	14	21	0
96	Alejandro Quintero	P	1	59	59.0	59	0	1	1	0
	TOTALS		58	2612	45.0	70	6	15	22	0

Kick return statistics
#	NAME	POS	RTNS	YDS	AVG	TD	LNG
12	Jaylin Lucas	RB	22	572	26.0	1	100
33	David Holloman	RB	3	41	13.7	0	18
26	Josh Henderson	RB	3	25	8.33	0	12
26	Joshua Rudolph	LB	1	14	14.0	0	14
28	Christian Turner	RB	1	3	3.0	0	3
4	DeQuece Carter	WR	1	2	2.0	0	2
	TOTALS		31	657	21.2	1	100

Punt return statistics
#	NAME	POS	RTNS	YDS	AVG	TD	LONG
4	DeQuece Carter	WR	2	14	7.0	0	15
12	Jaylin Lucas	RB	9	14	1.6	0	29
89	Camden Jordan	WR	1	3	3.0	0	3
	TOTALS		12	31	2.6	0	29

=== Awards and honors ===
==== Weekly individual awards ====
Big Ten Weekly Honors
Date	Player	Position	Award
Week 10	Aaron Casey	LB	Defensive Player of the Week
Week 13	Aaron Casey	LB	Defensive Player of the Week

==== Individual yearly awards ====
National Awards
Award	Player	Position
Burlsworth Trophy Nominee	Trey Walker	TE
Wuerffel Trophy Nominee	Aaron Casey	LB

==== Big Ten Conference ====
All-Big Ten Team
Award	Player	Position
1st Team	Aaron Casey	LB
3rd Team	James Evans	P
3rd Team	Jaylin Lucas	RS
Honorable Mention	Zach Carpenter	OL
Honorable Mention	Andre Carter	DL
Honorable Mention	Donaven McCulley	WR
Honorable Mention	Kobee Minor	DB
