= 2022 Indiana Hoosiers football team =

American college football season

2022 Indiana Hoosiers football
- Conference: Big Ten Conference
- East Division
- Record: 4–8 (2–7 Big Ten)
- Head coach: Tom Allen (6th season)
- Co-offensive coordinators: Walt Bell (1st season); Adam Henry (1st season)
- Offensive scheme: Multiple
- Defensive coordinator: Chad Wilt (1st season)
- Base defense: Multiple 4–2–5
- MVP: Bryant Fitzgerald
- Captains: AJ Barner; Cam Jones; Devon Matthews; Tiawan Mullen; Jack Tuttle
- Home stadium: Memorial Stadium

Uniform
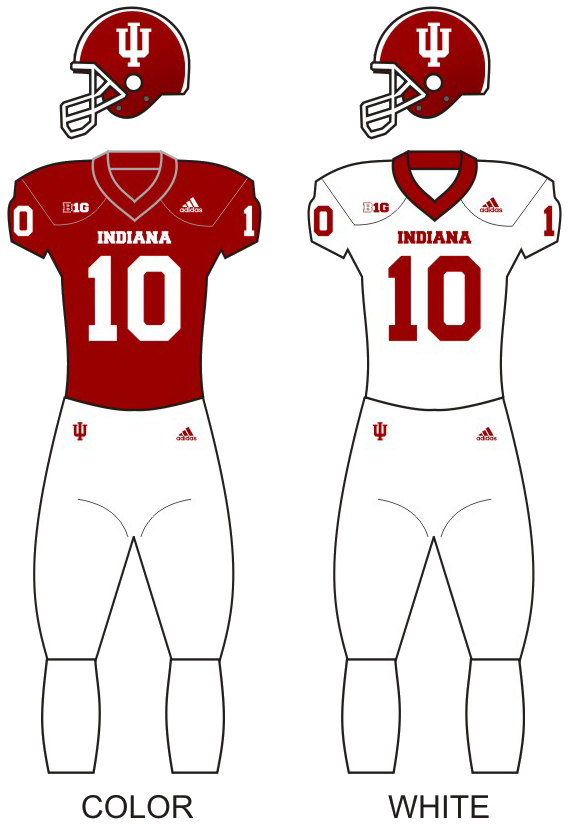

2022 Big Ten Conference football standings
	Conf.			Overall
Team	W		L	W		L
East Division
No. 3 Michigan xy$^	9	–	0	13	–	1
No. 4 Ohio State ^	8	–	1	11	–	2
No. 7 Penn State	7	–	2	11	–	2
Maryland	4	–	5	8	–	5
Indiana	2	–	7	4	–	8
Rutgers	1	–	8	4	–	8
Michigan State†	0	–	6	0	–	7
West Division
Purdue xy	6	–	3	8	–	6
Illinois	5	–	4	8	–	5
Iowa	5	–	4	8	–	5
Minnesota	5	–	4	9	–	4
Wisconsin	4	–	5	7	–	6
Nebraska	3	–	6	4	–	8
Northwestern	1	–	8	1	–	11
Championship: Michigan 43, Purdue 22
^ – College Football Playoff participant; $ – Conference champion; x – Division champion/co-champions; y – Championship game participant; † — NCAA vacated all wins for Michigan State (5–7, 3–6); Rankings from AP Poll

The 2022 Indiana Hoosiers football team represented Indiana University in the 2022 NCAA Division I FBS football season. The Hoosiers played their home games at Memorial Stadium in Bloomington, Indiana, and competed as a member of the East Division of the Big Ten Conference. The team was led by sixth-year head coach Tom Allen. They finished the season 4–8, 2–7 in Big Ten play to finish in sixth place in the East division.

== Spring game ==
The Hoosiers did not hold an official 2022 spring game, instead choosing to have closed-practices throughout the spring, with the general public and media not in attendance. The Hoosiers have not held an official Spring Game since 2019.

== Offseason ==
=== Coaching changes ===
Following the release of Nick Sheridan as offensive coordinator, the Hoosiers would announce on December 9, 2021, that they had hired former UMass head coach as their new offensive coordinator; Bell had previously coached Umass from 2019 to 2021.

On January 31, 2022, the Notre Dame Fighting Irish announced that they had hired Indiana running backs coach Deland McCullough to the same position for their team; McCullough had previously coached for one year with the Hoosiers. On February 7, 2022, Indiana announced that they had hired former NY Giants running backs coach Craig Johnson as the Hoosiers' new running backs coach; Johnson had served as the running backs coach for the NFL's New York Giants from 2014 to 2019.

=== Transfers ===
Outgoing

Notable departures from the 2021 squad included:

Name	Number	Pos.	Height	Weight	Year	Hometown	Notes
Michael Penix Jr.	9	Quarterback	6'3'	218	Junior (Redshirt)	Tampa, Florida	Transferred
Tim Baldwin	20	Running back	6'0'	211	Sophomore	Nokesville, Virginia	Transferred
Jacolby Hewitt	2	Wide Receiver	6'1'	198	Junior (Redshirt)	Cordova, Tennessee	Transferred
Brady Feeney	2	Offensive Lineman	6'4'	320	Freshman (Redshirt)	St. Louis, Missouri	Transferred
D. K. Bonhomme	42	Outside linebacker	6'3'	235	Junior	Ottawa, Ontario, Canada	Transferred
Micah McFadden	47	Linebacker	6'2'	232	Senior	Tampa, Florida	Declared for NFL Draft
Peyton Hendershot	86	Tight end	6'4'	254	Senior (Redshirt)	North Salem, Indiana	Declared for NFL Draft

Incoming

Name	Number	Pos.	Height	Weight	Year	Hometown	Notes	Prev. School
Connor Bazelak	9	Quarterback	6'3"	202	Sophomore (Redshirt)	Indianapolis, Indiana	Transfer	Missouri
Shaun Shivers	2	Running back	5'7"	188	Senior (Redshirt)	Fort Lauderdale, Florida	Transfer	Auburn

=== 2022 NFL draft ===
Hoosiers who were picked in the 2022 NFL draft:

Round	Pick	Player	Position	Team
5	146	Micah McFadden	Linebacker	New York Giants
UFA		Peyton Hendershot	Tight end	Dallas Cowboys
UFA		Marcelino McCrary-Ball	Linebacker	San Francisco 49ers

== Preseason ==
=== Preseason Big Ten poll ===
Although the Big Ten Conference has not held an official preseason poll since 2010, Cleveland.com has polled sports journalists representing all member schools as a de facto preseason media poll since 2011. For the 2022 poll, Indiana was projected to finish last in the East Division.

== Schedule ==
The Hoosiers' 2022 schedule consisted of seven home games and five away games. The Hoosiers played three non-conference games, against Idaho and Western Kentucky at home and on the road against Cincinnati. In conference, Indiana hosted Illinois, Michigan, Maryland, Penn State and Purdue. They traveled to Nebraska, Rutgers, Ohio State and Michigan State.

Date	Time	Opponent	Site	TV	Result	Attendance
September 2	8:00 p.m.	Illinois	Memorial Stadium; Bloomington, IN (rivalry)	FS1	W 23–20	44,357
September 10	8:00 p.m.	Idaho*	Memorial Stadium; Bloomington, IN	BTN	W 35–22	46,785
September 17	12:00 p.m.	Western Kentucky*	Memorial Stadium; Bloomington, IN	BTN	W 33–30 ^{OT}	48,952
September 24	3:30 p.m.	at Cincinnati*	Nippert Stadium; Cincinnati, OH	ESPN2	L 24–45	38,464
October 1	7:30 p.m.	at Nebraska	Memorial Stadium; Lincoln, NE	BTN	L 21–35	86,804
October 8	12:00 p.m.	No. 4 Michigan^{†}	Memorial Stadium; Bloomington, IN	FOX	L 10–31	50,805
October 15	3:30 p.m.	Maryland	Memorial Stadium; Bloomington, IN	ESPN2	L 33–38	41,154
October 22	12:00 p.m.	at Rutgers	SHI Stadium; Piscataway, NJ	BTN	L 17–24	43,255
November 5	3:30 p.m.	No. 15 Penn State	Memorial Stadium; Bloomington, IN	ABC	L 14–45	45,142
November 12	12:00 p.m.	at No. 2 Ohio State	Ohio Stadium; Columbus, OH	FOX	L 14–56	103,888
November 19	12:00 p.m.	at Michigan State	Spartan Stadium; East Lansing, MI (rivalry)	BTN	W 39–31 ^{2OT}	56,136
November 26	3:30 p.m.	Purdue	Memorial Stadium; Bloomington, IN (Old Oaken Bucket)	BTN	L 16–30	51,148
*Non-conference game; ^{†}Homecoming; Rankings from AP and CFP Rankings, after November 1 released prior to game; All times are in Eastern time

== Game summaries ==
=== vs Illinois ===
	1	2	3	4	Total
Fighting Illini	7	3	7	3	20
Hoosiers	3	13	0	7	23

=== vs Idaho ===
Idaho Vandals (0–1) vs Indiana Hoosiers (1–0) – Game summary

Quarter	1	2	3	4	Total
Vandals	0	10	0	12	22
Hoosiers	0	0	23	12	35

at Memorial Stadium • Bloomington, IN

- Date: September 10, 2022
- Game time: 8:00 p.m. EDT
- Game attendance: 46,785
- TV announcers (BTN): Matt Schumacker (play-by-play), J Leman (analyst), and Shane Sparks (sideline reporter)

=== vs Western Kentucky ===
	1	2	3	4	OT	Total
Hilltoppers	7	10	7	6	0	30
Hoosiers	3	7	3	17	3	33

Statistics	WKU	IU
First downs	25	28
Total yards	545	484
Rushing yards	216	120
Passing yards	329	364
Turnovers	2	1
Time of possession	32:21	27:39

Team	Category	Player	Statistics
Western Kentucky	Passing	Austin Reed	33/43, 329 yards, 2 TD, INT
Western Kentucky	Rushing	Kye Robichaux	14 rushes, 135 yards
Western Kentucky	Receiving	Daewood Davis	5 receptions, 77 yards, TD
Indiana	Passing	Connor Bazelak	33/55, 364 yards, 2 TD
Indiana	Rushing	Josh Henderson	11 rushes, 65 yards, TD
Indiana	Receiving	Cam Camper	8 receptions, 93 yards, TD

=== at Cincinnati ===
Game Four – Indiana Hoosiers at Cincinnati Bearcats

Quarter	1	2	3	4	Total
Hoosiers	3	7	7	7	24
Bearcats	10	28	0	7	45

at Nippert Stadium • Cincinnati, Ohio

- Date: Saturday, September 24, 2022
- Game time: 3:30 p.m. EDT
- Game weather: Partly Cloudy • Temperature: 75 °F (24 °C) • Wind: 5 mph
- Game attendance: 38,464
- Referee: Luke Richmond
- TV announcers (ESPN2): Beth Mowins (play-by-play), Kirk Morrison (analyst), and Stormy Buonantony (sideline reporter)
- ESPN

Game information

First quarter

- (6:00) Cincinnati – Ryan Coe 24 yard field goal (Drive: 4 plays, 0 yards, 2:00; Cincinnati 3–0)
- (1:15) Indiana – Charles Campbell 27 yard field goal (Drive: 16 plays, 66 yards, 4:45; Tied 3–3)
- (1:00) Cincinnati – Tyler Scott 75 yard pass from Ben Bryant, Ryan Coe kick (Drive: 1 play, 75 yards, 0:10; Cincinnati 10–3)

Second quarter

- (12:36) Cincinnati – Tre Tucker 5 yard pass from Ben Bryant, Ryan Coe kick (Drive: 6 plays, 64 yards, 2:13; Cincinnati 17–3)
- (8:06) Indiana – Josh Henderson 19 yard pass from Connor Bazelak, Charles Campbell kick (Drive: 4 plays, 39 yards, 1:05; Cincinnati 17–10)
- (4:33) Cincinnati – Tyler Scott 34 yard pass from Ben Bryant, Ryan Coe kick (Drive: 7 plays, 75 yards, 3:33; Cincinnati 24–10)
- (0:32) Cincinnati – Tyler Scott 32 yard pass from Ben Bryant, Ryan Coe kick (Drive: 7 plays, 80 yards, 2:19; Cincinnati 31–10)
- (0:22) Cincinnati – Dominique Perry 14 yard fumble recovery, Ryan Coe kick (Cincinnati 38–10)

Third quarter

- (10:23) Indiana – Shaun Shivers 2 yard pass from Connor Bazelak, Charles Campbell kick (Drive: 11 plays 51 yards 3:07; Cincinnati 38–17)

Fourth quarter

- (14:01) Indiana – Shawn Shivers 47 yard rush, Charles Campbell kick (Drive: 3 plays 58 yards 0:46; Cincinnati 38–24)
- (14:01) Cincinnati – Corey Kiner 1 yard rush, Ryan Coe kick (Drive: 3 Plays 2 Yards 1:26; Cincinnati 45–24)

Statistics	IU	CIN
First downs	27	15
Plays–yards	104–348	70–394
Rushes–yards	38–68	30–40
Passing yards	280	354
Passing: comp–att–int	31–66–2	24–40–1
Time of possession	29:01	29:59

Team	Category	Player	Statistics
Indiana	Passing	Connor Bazelak	31–66, 280 yards, 2 TD, 2 INT
Indiana	Rushing	Shaun Shivers	19 carries, 90 yards, 1 TD
Indiana	Receiving	Cam Camper	10 receptions, 126 yards
Cincinnati	Passing	Ben Bryant	24–40, 354 yards, 4 TD, 1 INT
Cincinnati	Rushing	Charles McClelland	9 carries, 25 yards
Cincinnati	Receiving	Tyler Scott	10 receptions, 185 yards, 3 TD

=== at Nebraska ===
Indiana Hoosiers (3–1) vs Nebraska Cornhuskers (1–3) – Game summary

Quarter	1	2	3	4	Total
Hoosiers	0	21	0	0	21
Cornhuskers	7	14	0	14	35

at Memorial Stadium • Lincoln, NE

- Date: October 1, 2022
- Game time: 6:30 p.m.
- Game weather: Sunny, 76 °F (24 °C)
- Game attendance: 86,804
- Referee: Reggie Smith
- TV announcers (BTN): Mark Followill (play-by-play), Matt Millen (analyst), and Meghan McKeown (sideline reporter)

Game information

First quarter

- (13:17) NEB – Oliver Martin 34-yard pass from Casey Thompson, Timmy Bleekrode kick (Drive: 3 plays, 72 yards, 0:47; Nebraska 7–0)

Second quarter

- (12:17) IU – Myles Jackson 0-yard fumble return, Charles Campbell kick (Drive: 3 plays, -9 yards, 1:09; Tied 7–7)
- (10:03) NEB – Malcolm Hertzog 30-yard blocked punt return, Timmy Bleekrode kick (Drive: 3 plays, 1 yard, 0:51; Nebraska 14–7)
- (5:54) NEB – Jaquez Yant 1-yard run, Timmy Bleekrode kick (Drive: 8 plays, 55 yards, 3:08; Nebraska 21–7)
- (3:09) IU – Emery Simmons 13-yard pass from Connor Bazelak, Charles Campbell kick (Drive: 7 plays, 75 yards, 2:45; Nebraska 21–14)
- (0:15) IU – Shaun Shivers 1-yard run, Charles Campbell kick (Drive: 6 plays, 70 yards, 1:53; Tied 21–21)

Third quarter

None'

Fourth quarter

- (13:43) NEB – Trey Palmer 71-yard pass from Casey Thompson, Timmy Bleekrode kick (Drive: 3 plays, 87 yards, 0:59; Nebraska 28–21)
- (6:53) NEB – Casey Thompson 1-yard run, Timmy Bleekrode kick (Drive: 12 plays, 54 yards, 6:05; Nebraska 35–21)

Statistics	IU	NEB
First downs	14	22
Total yards	290	385
Rushes/yards	23–67	51–115
Passing yards	223	270
Passing: Comp–Att–Int	22–44–1	18–27–1
Time of possession	25:09	34:51

Team	Category	Player	Statistics
Indiana	Passing	Connor Bazelak	22/44, 223 yards, TD, INT
Indiana	Rushing	Jaylin Lucas	3 carries, 39 yards
Indiana	Receiving	Emery Simmons	6 receptions, 57 yards, TD
Nebraska	Passing	Casey Thompson	18/27, 270 yards, 2 TD, INT
Nebraska	Rushing	Anthony Grant	32 carries, 136 yards
Nebraska	Receiving	Trey Palmer	8 receptions, 157 yards, 1 TD

=== vs No. 4 Michigan ===
No. 4 Michigan at Indiana

Team	1	2	3	4	Total
• No. 4 Wolverines	10	0	7	14	31
Hoosiers	7	3	0	0	10

- Date: October 8
- Location: Memorial Stadium
  Bloomington, IN
- Game start: 12:06 p.m. EDT
- Elapsed time: 3:37
- Game attendance: 50,805
- Game weather: 50 °F (10 °C), sunny, N 4 MPH
- Referee: Jerry McGinn
- TV announcers (FOX): Gus Johnson (play-by-play), Joel Klatt (analyst), and Jenny Taft (sideline reporter)

Scoring summary
1	12:32	MICH	Blake Corum 1-yard run (Jake Moody kick)	MICH 7–0
1	4:54	IND	Josh Henderson 11-yard pass from Connor Bazelak (Charles Campbell kick)	Tied 7–7
1	1:02	MICH	Jake Moody 44-yard field goal	MICH 10–7
2	12:08	IND	Charles Campbell 41-yard field goal	Tied 10–10
3	7:39	MICH	Cornelius Johnson 29-yard pass from J. J. McCarthy (Jake Moody kick)	MICH 17–10
4	9:43	MICH	Luke Schoonmaker 9-yard pass from J. J. McCarthy (Jake Moody kick)	MICH 24–10
4	2:54	MICH	Cornelius Johnson 6-yard pass from J. J. McCarthy (Jake Moody kick)	MICH 31–10

Statistics	No. 4 UM	IU
First downs	26	21
Plays–yards	76–469	74–222
Rushes–yards	40–165	25–19
Passing yards	304	203
Passing: comp–att–int	28–36–1	25–49–1
Time of possession	37:53	22:07

Team	Category	Player	Statistics
No. 4 Michigan	Passing	J. J. McCarthy	28/36, 304 yards, 3 TD, 1 INT
No. 4 Michigan	Rushing	Blake Corum	25 carries, 124 yards, 1 TD
No. 4 Michigan	Receiving	Ronnie Bell	11 receptions, 121 yards
Indiana	Passing	Connor Bazelak	25/49, 203 yards, 1 TD, 1 INT
Indiana	Rushing	Jaylin Lucas	4 carries, 45 yards
Indiana	Receiving	Emery Simmons	7 receptions, 57 yards

=== vs Maryland ===
Maryland Terrapins (4-2) at Indiana Hoosiers (3-3) - Game summary

Quarter	1	2	3	4	Total
Maryland	7	7	10	14	38
Indiana	3	14	3	13	33

at Memorial Stadium • Bloomington, IN

- Date: October 15
- Game time: 3:30 p.m. EST/12:30 p.m. PST
- Game weather: Sunny • Temperature: 57 °F (14 °C) • Wind: 8 mph W
- Game attendance: 41,154
- Referee: Jeffrey Servinski
- TV announcers (ESPN2): Anish Shroff (play-by-play), Brock Osweiler (analyst), and Taylor McGregor (sideline reporter)

Game information

First quarter

- 13:03 MD - Taulia Tagovailoa 3-yard run (Chad Ryland kick) - 7–0 Maryland, Drive: 4 plays, 29 yards, 1:51
- 8:53 IND - Charles Campbell 38-yard field goal - 7–3 Maryland, Drive: 11 plays, 55 yards, 4:10

Second quarter

- 14:49 MD - CJ Dippre 18-yard pass from Taulia Tagovailoa (Chad Ryland kick) - 14–3 Maryland, Drive: 8 plays, 71 yards, 4:10
- 9:52 IND - Josh Henderson 44-yard pass from Connor Bazelak (Charles Campbell kick) - 14–10 Maryland, Drive: 8 plays, 67 yards, 2:44
- 1:47 IND - Cam Camper 3-yard pass from Connor Bazelak (Charles Campbell kick) - 17–14 Indiana, Drive: 11 plays, 80 yards, 3:20

Third quarter

- 13:23 MD - Dontay Demus Jr. 17-yard pass from Taulia Tagovailoa (Chad Ryland kick) - 21–17 Maryland, Drive: 4 plays, 45 yards, 1:28
- 8:52 MD - Chad Ryland 36-yard field goal - 24–17 Maryland, Drive: 10 plays, 36 yards, 4:25
- 3:16 IND - Charles Campbell 26-yard field goal - 24–20 Maryland, Drive: 17 plays, 57 yards, 5:36

Fourth quarter

- 14:09 IND - Josh Henderson 2-yard run (Charles Campbell kick) - 27–24 Indiana, Drive: 7 plays, 58 yards, 2:40
- 5:35 MD - Roman Hemby 6-yard run (Chad Ryland kick) - 31–27 Maryland, Drive: 7 plays, 61 yards, 2:30
- 2:11 MD - Billy Edwards Jr. 3-yard run (Chad Ryland kick) - 38–27 Maryland, Drive: 7 plays, 62 yards, 2:51
- 0:54 IND - Aaron Steinfeldt 3-yard pass from Connor Bazelak (Connor Bazelak two-point pass incomplete) - 38–33 Maryland, Drive: 8 plays, 75 yards, 1:17

Statistics	Maryland	Indiana
First downs	25	23
Plays–yards	82–442	75–351
Rushes–yards	40–172	32–36
Passing yards	270	315
Passing: comp–att–int	25–42–0	30–43–2
Time of possession	34:44	25:16

Team	Category	Player	Statistics
Maryland	Passing	Taulia Tagovailoa	25/39, 270 yards, 2 TD
Maryland	Rushing	Roman Hemby	17 carries, 107 yards, 1 TD
Maryland	Receiving	Jacob Copeland	4 receptions, 62 yards
Indiana	Passing	Connor Bazelak	29/42, 292 yards, 3 TD, 2 INT
Indiana	Rushing	Shaun Shivers	14 carries, 32 yards
Indiana	Receiving	Emery Simmons	6 receptions, 99 yards

=== at Rutgers ===
	1	2	3	4	Total
Hoosiers	14	0	0	3	17
Scarlet Knights	0	7	10	7	24

=== vs No. 15 Penn State ===
No. 15 Penn State at Indiana – Game summary

Quarter	1	2	3	4	Total
No. 15 Penn State	7	17	7	14	45
Indiana	7	0	0	7	14

at Memorial Stadium, Bloomington, Indiana

- Date: November 5
- Game time: 3:30 p.m. EDT
- Game weather: 65 °F (18 °C), cloudy
- Game attendance: 45,142
- Referee: Michael Cannon
- TV announcers (ABC): Bob Wischusen (play-by-play), Dan Orlovsky (analyst), and Kris Budden (sideline reporter)
- ESPN box score

Game information

First quarter

- PSU – Nicholas Singleton, 1-yard TD run, Jake Pinegar kick, 6:50 (7–0, PSU)
- IU – A. J. Barner, 11-yard TD pass from Jack Tuttle, Charles Campbell kick, 4:09 (7–7, TIE)

Second quarter

- PSU – Kaytron Allen, 11-yard TD run, Pinegar kick, 9:25 (14–7, PSU)
- PSU – Allen, 6-yard TD run, Pinegar kick, 5:04 (21–7, PSU)
- PSU – Pinegar, 50-yard field goal, 0:50 (24–7, PSU)

Third quarter

- PSU – Allen, 6-yard TD run, Pinegar kick, 8:21 (31–7, PSU)

Fourth quarter

- PSU – Harrison Wallace III, 1-yard TD pass from Drew Allar, Pinegar kick, 14:09 (38–7, PSU)
- PSU – Theo Johnson, 4-yard TD pass from Allar, Pinegar kick, 13:51 (45–7, PSU)
- IU – Jaylin Lucas, 1-yard TD run, Campbell kick, 6:16 (45–14, PSU)

Statistics	PSU	IU
First downs	27	11
Plays–yards	84–483	63–196
Rushes–yards	49–179	34–65
Passing yards	304	131
Passing: comp–att–int	24–35–1	16–29–3
Time of possession	35:53	24:07

Team	Category	Player	Statistics
Penn State	Passing	Sean Clifford	15/23, 229 yards, INT
Penn State	Rushing	Kaytron Allen	18 carries, 86 yards, 3 TD
Penn State	Receiving	Kaytron Allen	2 receptions, 72 yards
Indiana	Passing	Jack Tuttle	9/12, 82 yards, TD
Indiana	Rushing	Josh Henderson	7 carries, 44 yards
Indiana	Receiving	Andison Coby	1 receptions, 35 yards

=== at No. 2 Ohio State ===
No. 2 Ohio State Buckeyes (9-0) vs Indiana Hoosiers (3-6) – Game summary

Quarter	1	2	3	4	Total
Indiana	7	0	0	7	14
No. 2 Ohio State	21	7	14	14	56

at Ohio Stadium, Columbus, Ohio

- Date: November 12
- Game time: 12:00 p.m. EST
- Game weather: Snow, 39 °F (4 °C)
- Game attendance: 103,888
- Referee: Larry Smith
- TV announcers (FOX): Gus Johnson (play-by-play), Joel Klatt (analyst), and Jenny Taft (sideline reporter)
- Spread: Ohio State –40 • Odds to win: Ohio State 98.5% •

Game information

First quarter

- 9:42 OSU - Emeka Egbuka from C. J. Stroud for a 6 yard TD (Noah Ruggles kick) - Ohio State 7–0, Drive: 6 plays, 65 yards, 2:19
- 4:31 OSU - Dallen Hayden runs for a 14 yard TD (Noah Ruggles kick) - Ohio State 14–0, Drive: 8 plays, 78 yards, 3:37
- 2:37 OSU - Marvin Harrison Jr. from C. J. Stroud for a 58 yard TD (Noah Ruggles kick) - Ohio State 21–0, Drive: 1 play, 58 yards, 0:09
- 0:04 IU - A. J. Barner from Dexter Williams II for a 7 yard TD (Charles Campbell kick) - Ohio State 21–7, Drive: 6 plays, 75 yards, 2:33

Second quarter

- 10:41 OSU - Miyan Williams runs for a 48 yard TD (Noah Ruggles kick) - Ohio State 28–7, Drive: 3 plays, 57 yards, 0:27

Third quarter

- 9:33 OSU - Cade Stover from C. J. Stroud for a 1 yard TD (Noah Ruggles kick) - Ohio State 35–7,Drive: 2 plays, 2 yards, 0:15
- 7:38 OSU - Cade Stover from C. J. Stroud for a 12 yard TD (Noah Ruggles kick) - Ohio State 42–7, Drive: 3 plays, 52 yards, 1:15

Fourth quarter

- 14:07 OSU - Xavier Johnson runs for a 71 yard TD (Noah Ruggles kick) - Ohio State 49–7, Drive: 1 play, 71 yards, 0:16
- 12:03 IU - Donaven McCulley from Dexter Williams II for a 19 yard TD (Charles Campbell kick) - Ohio State 49–14,Drive: 2 plays, 18 yards, 0:29
- 8:49 OSU - Kamryn Babb from C. J. Stroud for an 8 yard TD (Noah Ruggles kick) - Ohio State 56–14, Drive: 6 plays, 75 yards, 3:14

Statistics	Indiana	No. 2 Ohio State
First downs	11	27
Plays–yards	64–269	73–662
Rushes–yards	41–150	43–340
Passing yards	119	322
Passing: comp–att–int	9–24–0	19–30–0
Time of possession	26:41	33:19

Team	Category	Player	Statistics
Indiana	Passing	Dexter Williams II	6–19, 107 yards, 2 TDs
Indiana	Rushing	Dexter Williams II	16 carries, 46 yards
Indiana	Receiving	Andison Coby	1 reception 49 yards
No. 2 Ohio State	Passing	C. J. Stroud	17–28, 297 yards, 5 TDs
No. 2 Ohio State	Rushing	Miyan Williams	15 carries, 147 yards, 1 TD
No. 2 Ohio State	Receiving	Marvin Harrison Jr.	7 receptions, 135 yards, 1 TD

=== at Michigan State ===
Week Eleven: Indiana at Michigan State – Game summary

Quarter	1	2	3	4	OT	2OT	Total
Indiana	7	0	17	7	0	8	39
Michigan State	3	21	7	0	0	0	31

at Spartan Stadium • East Lansing, MI

- Date: November 19, 2022
- Game time: 12:00 p.m.
- Game weather: 23 °F (−5 °C), Cloudy, Wind: SW 14 mph (23 km/h)
- Game attendance: 56,136
- Referee: Jerry McGinn
- TV announcers (BTN): Cory Provus (play-by-play), Matt Millen (analyst), and Elise Menaker (sideline reporter)

Game information

First Quarter

- (12:13) IND TD: Dexter Williams II 34-yard run (Charles Campbell kick)
  IND 7–0; 4 plays, 50 yards, 1:38
- (09:02) MSU FG: Ben Patton 19-yard field goal
  IND 7–3; 10 plays, 73 yards, 4:10

Second Quarter

- (11:50) MSU TD: Maliq Carr 5-yard pass from Payton Thorne (Ben Patton kick)
  MSU 10–7; 7 plays, 54 yards, 3:18
- (06:22) MSU TD: Elijah Collins 1-yard run (Ben Patton kick)
  MSU 17–7; 8 plays 69 yards, 3:19
- (00:51) MSU TD: Keon Coleman 2-yard pass from Payton Thorne (Ben Patton kick)
  MSU 24–7, 9 plays, 34 yards, 3:19

Third Quarter

- (13:40) IND TD: Shaun Shivers 79-yard run (Charles Campbell kick)
  MSU 24–14; 1 play, 79 yards, 0:13
- (06:17) MSU TD: Elijah Collins 31-yard run (Ben Patton kick)
  MSU 31–14; 6 plays, 69, yards, 3:26
- (06:04) IND TD: Shan Shivers 88-yard kickoff return (Charles Campbell kick)
  MSU 31–21
- (04:14) IND FG: Charles Campbell 40-yard field goal
  MSU 31–24; 4 plays 6 yards, 1:35

Fourth Quarter

- (12:59) IND TD: Josh Henderson 1-yard run (Charles Campbell kick)
  Tied 31–31; 9 plays 70 yards, 3:51

Second Overtime

- (00:00) IND TD: Shaun Shivers 1-yard run (A. J. Barner pass)
  IND 39–31; 2 plays, 25 yards, 0:00

Passing

- IND – Dexter Williams II: 2/7, 31 yards
- MSU – Payton Thorne: 27/42, 298 yards, 2 TD, 1 INT

Rushing

- IND – Shaun Shivers: 13 carries, 115 yards, 2 TD
- MSU – Jalen Berger: 21 carries, 125 yards

Receiving

- IND – A. J. Barner: 1 reception, 24 yards
- MSU – Keon Coleman: 8 receptions, 104 yards, 1 TD

=== vs Purdue ===
	1	2	3	4	Total
Boilermakers	3	0	14	13	30
Hoosiers	7	0	0	9	16

== Roster ==
2022 Indiana Hoosiers football team roster
Players
Coaches
Offense

Pos.	#	Name	Class
WR	0	Emery Simmons	Sr
WR	1	Donaven McCulley	So
RB	2	Shaun Shivers	Sr
WR	3	Omar Cooper Jr.	Fr
WR	4	David Baker (injured)	So
QB	5	Dexter Williams II	So
WR	6	Cam Camper (injured)	Jr
WR	7	D.J. Matthews	Sr
WR	8	Jaquez Smith (injured)	Fr
QB	9	Connor Bazelak	Jr
WR	10	Andison Coby	Jr
RB	12	Jaylin Lucas	Fr
WR	13	Kamryn Perry	Fr
QB	14	Jack Tuttle (injured)	Sr
QB	15	Brendan Sorsby	Fr
QB	16	Grant Gremel	Jr
WR	18	Javon Swinton	Jr
WR	19	Malachi Holt-Bennett	So
QB	25	Will Jontz	Jr
RB	26	Josh Henderson	Sr
RB	27	Trent Howland	Fr
RB	28	Charlie Spegal	So
RB	33	David Holloman	Fr
RB	35	Brett Wethington	So
RB	36	Reece Lozano	Fr
RB	37	Declan McMahon	Fr
WR	38	Jackson Wasserstrom	Fr
TE	39	Ryan Barnes	Sr
TE	45	Trey Walker	Jr
TE	48	James Bomba	Fr
TE	49	Sam Daugstrup	So
OL	50	Zach Carpenter	Jr
OL	51	Parker Hannah	Sr
OL	53	Vinny Fiacable	Fr
OL	54	Jack Greer	Fr
OL	55	Caleb Murphy	So
OL	56	Mike Katic	Jr
OL	58	Chris Bradberry	Sr
OL	61	Ricky Tamis	Jr
OL	62	Cameron Knight	So
OL	65	Carter Smith	Fr
OL	67	Kahlil Benson	So
OL	69	Peter Schulz	Jr
OL	70	Luke Haggard	Sr
OL	71	Randy Holtz	So
OL	72	DJ Moore	Fr
OL	73	Tim Weaver	Jr
OL	74	Bray Lynch	Fr
OL	75	Luke Wiginton	So
OL	76	Matthew Bedford (injured)	Sr
OL	77	Joshua Sales Jr.	Fr
OL	79	Max Williams	Fr
WR	80	Connor Delp	Fr
WR	81	Brady Simmons	Fr
WR	82	Christian Harris	Sr
WR	83	Eli Jochem	Fr
TE	84	Aaron Steinfeldt	Fr
WR	85	McCall Ray	Jr
TE	86	Brody Foley	Fr
TE	87	Ryan Miller (injured)	Fr
TE	88	AJ Barner	Jr
WR	89	Camden Jordan	So

Defense

Pos.	#	Name	Class
OLB	0	Dasan McCullough	Fr
DB	1	Devon Matthews	Sr
DB	2	James Monds III	Fr
DB	3	Tiawan Mullen	Sr
LB	4	Cam Jones (injured)	Sr
LB	5	Bradley Jennings Jr.	Sr
DL	6	James Head Jr.	Sr
DB	7	Christopher Keys	So
LB	8	Jared Casey	Jr
DB	9	Brylan Lanier	Fr
OLB	10	Myles Jackson	So
DB	12	Lem Watley-Neely	So
DL	13	Trevell Mullen	Fr
LB	14	Kaiden Turner	Fr
DB	15	Phillip Dunnam	Fr
DB	16	Jordan Grier	So
DB	17	Jonathan Haynes	Sr
DB	19	Josh Sanguinetti	Jr
DB	20	Louis Moore	Jr
DB	21	Noah Pierre	Sr
DB	22	Jamari Sharpe	Fr
DB	23	Jaylin Williams	Sr
DB	24	Bryson Bonds	So
LB	27	Xavier Trueblood	So
DB	29	Liam Zaccheo	So
DB	30	Mitchell Evans	Fr
DB	31	Bryant Fitzgerald	Sr
DB	33	Connor Hole	So
LB	34	Jeff Utzinger	Fr
DB	35	Aaron Stewart	Fr
DB	36	Nicholas Grieser	Jr
OLB	37	Jackson Schott	Fr
DB	38	Drew Pearce	Fr
DL	40	Richard Thomas Jr	Fr
DL	41	Beau Robbins	Jr
DB	42	Patrick Finley	So
LB	43	Matt Hohlt	Fr
LB	44	Aaron Casey	Sr
LB	45	Andrew Turvy	Fr
LB	46	Isaiah Jones	Fr
DL	47	JH Tevis	Sr
LB	48	Sam Tallen	Fr
DL	50	Sio Nofoagatoto'a	Sr
DL	51	Patrick Lucas	Jr
DL	55	Venson Sneed Jr.	Fr
DL	57	Julian Kameristy	Fr
DL	58	Aden Cannon	Fr
DL	60	Dalton Davis	Jr
DL	64	Race Stewart	Fr
DL	90	J'mari Monette	Fr
DL	91	LeDarrius Cox	Jr
OLB	92	Alfred Bryant	Sr
DL	94	DeMarcus Elliott	Sr
DL	98	Cooper Jones	Fr
DL	99	Nick James	Fr

Special teams

Pos.	#	Name	Class
K	80	Chris Freeman	So
K	93	Charles Campbell	Sr
P	94	James Evans	So
LS	95	Sean Wracher	Sr
P	96	Alejandro Quintero	So
LS	97	Jake Wellmann	So

Head coach

- Tom Allen

Coordinators/assistant coaches

- Craig Johnson (assistant head coach / running backs)
- Walt Bell (offensive coordinator / quarterbacks)
- Rod Carey (run game coordinator/offensive line)
- Adam Henry (co-offensive coordinator / wide receivers)
- Jason Jones (safeties)
- Paul Randolph (defensive line)
- Kasey Teegardin (special teams coordinator / outside linebackers)
- Chad Wilt (defensive coordinator / linebackers)
- Kevin Wright

Legend

- (C) Team captain
- (S) Suspended
- (I) Ineligible
- Injured
- Redshirt

Roster

== Radio ==
Radio coverage for all games was broadcast on IUHoosiers.com All-Access and on various radio frequencies throughout the state. The primary radio announcer is long-time broadcaster Don Fischer with Play-by-Play and pre, half, and post game shows by John Herrick.
