= E. J. Williams Jr. =

American football player (born 2001)

Profile
- Position: Wide receiver

Personal information
- Born: November 14, 2001 (age 25)
- Listed height: 6 ft 3 in (1.91 m)
- Listed weight: 203 lb (92 kg)

Career information
- High school: Central (Phenix City, Alabama)
- College: Clemson (2020–2022); Indiana (2023–2025)
- NFL draft: 2026: undrafted

Career history
- Las Vegas Raiders (2026)*; Carolina Panthers (2026)*
- * Offseason or practice squad member only

Awards and highlights
- CFP national champion (2025)
- Stats at ESPN

Eddie Benjamin "E. J." Williams Jr. (born November 14, 2001) is an American professional football wide receiver. He played college football for the Clemson Tigers and the Indiana Hoosiers. He was signed by the Las Vegas Raiders after going undrafted in the 2026 NFL draft.

== Early life ==
Williams attended Central High School in Phenix City, Alabama. During his junior and senior seasons there, he recorded 84 receptions for 1,407 yards and 19 touchdowns, including 44 receptions, 739 yards and 11 touchdowns in his senior season alone. He was selected to the Under Armour All-America Game after his senior year and was also named the Most Valuable Player from the Alabama-Mississippi All-Star game where he had 6 receptions for 98 yards. He received 25 NCAA Division I offers, including from Alabama, Auburn, Georgia, LSU, and Tennessee, but ultimately committed to Clemson.

College recruiting
Name	Hometown	School	Height	Weight	Commit date
E.J. Williams; WR	Phenix City, AL	Central	6 ft 2 in (1.88 m)	185 lb (84 kg)	Aug 24, 2019
E.J. Williams; WR	Recruit ratings: Rivals: 247Sports: ESPN: (84)				

== College career ==
=== Clemson (2020–2022) ===
==== 2020 season ====
In his freshman year, Williams played in 12 games, starting four, and recorded 24 receptions for 306 yards, both of which were fifth-highest on the team, along with 2 touchdowns. He caught his first touchdown on a 5-yard pass from Trevor Lawrence to go with 3 receptions for 38 yards receiving in a 52–17 win against the Pittsburgh Panthers. Before the game that took place on Military Appreciation Day, Williams changed his jersey number from 6 to 39 to honor his father, Eddie, who was a sergeant first class in the U.S. Army; he died at the age of 39. Clemson went 10–2 for the season and advanced to the 2020 ACC Championship Game, where they defeated the Notre Dame Fighting Irish 34–10. Williams had a career-high 80 yards off 4 receptions in that game; he scored his second touchdown of the season off a 33-yard pass from Lawrence. The team played against the Ohio State Buckeyes in the Sugar Bowl where they lost 49–28; Williams caught 5 passes for 45 yards.

==== 2021 season ====
In Clemson's first game of the season against the Georgia Bulldogs, Williams sustained a thumb injury in the 10–3 loss and was initially expected to miss 4–5 weeks. However, Williams decided to postpone surgery on it and was cleared to play shortly afterward. Williams caught 9 passes for 66 yards in his sophomore season while playing in eight games, starting two of them; he also made a tackle on special teams against the NC State Wolfpack. Head coach Dabo Swinney ruled Williams out for the Cheez-It Bowl against the Iowa State Cyclones after he contracted COVID-19.

==== 2022 season ====
Williams missed spring practice prior to the 2022 season with a knee injury that he first sustained in 2021 and underwent an arthroscopy as a result. He totaled 7 receptions for 70 yards in 242 offensive snaps as Clemson went 11–3 for the season.

=== Indiana (2023–present) ===
==== 2023 season ====
Williams committed to Indiana for the 2023 season, joining a receiver lineup which included Donaven McCulley and Cam Camper. He played in eight games with three starts but missed four games due to a hand injury sustained against the Indiana State Sycamores in week 2. Williams caught a two-point conversion pass attempt from Brendan Sorsby in a Week 11 matchup against the Illinois Fighting Illini to tie the game at 42–42. Despite this, Indiana was defeated by a score of 48–45 in overtime.

==== 2024 season ====
Williams sustained a hamstring injury prior to the season during fall camp practice. He played in Indiana's Week 4 game against the Charlotte 49ers, but did not have a reception. He had a 37-yard reception from Kurtis Rourke against the Northwestern Wildcats and a 12-yard catch against the Nebraska Cornhuskers. In October, Williams entered the transfer portal, stating "I made this decision because the team was perfectly fine without me in the game and I also want to have a chance at being able to continue my career at the professional level." However, he decided to withdraw from the portal and return to Indiana two months later, redshirting for the rest of the year following surgery on an unknown injury. He later stated, "I didn't even want to go into the portal to start with".

==== 2025 season ====
Williams began his final year of eligibility with a Week 2 win against the Kennesaw State Owls, where he caught an 8-yard touchdown pass from Fernando Mendoza. This was his first touchdown for Indiana and his first since 2020, and included in his 3 receptions for 27 yards. This was preceded with a performance against the Old Dominion Monarchs in Week 1 where he had a team-leading 5 catches for 45 yards, including a 22-yard reception. Williams then had 2 receptions for 27 yards, including a 18-yard catch, in a 73–0 blowout win against the Indiana State Sycamores. He had 3 catches for 17 yards and a touchdown, which came from a 11-yard pass from Mendoza in a 63–10 blowout win against the No. 9-ranked Illinois Fighting Illini. Williams then caught a lone 37-yard pass from Mendoza in a 20–15 win against the Iowa Hawkeyes to start the season 5–0 for the second consecutive year under second-year coach Curt Cignetti. He caught a 13-yard touchdown pass from Mendoza in Week 7 against Michigan State Spartans, ending with 5 receptions for 59 yards and the touchdown in that game. Williams then had a career game-high 109 yards receiving from 5 receptions with two touchdowns in the following week against the UCLA Bruins, including a 62-yard touchdown reception; as a result, he had his first game with 100+ receiving yards.

== Professional career ==
Pre-draft measurables
Height	Weight	Arm length	Hand span	Wingspan	40-yard dash	10-yard split	20-yard split	20-yard shuttle	Three-cone drill	Vertical jump	Broad jump	Bench press
6 ft 3 3/8 in (1.91 m)	203 lb (92 kg)	33 1/2 in (0.85 m)	10 in (0.25 m)	6 ft 8 3/4 in (2.05 m)	4.52 s	1.60 s	2.65 s	4.31 s	7.15 s	36.0 in (0.91 m)	10 ft 7 in (3.23 m)	11 reps
All values from Pro Day

=== Las Vegas Raiders ===
On April 30, 2026, Williams signed with the Las Vegas Raiders as an undrafted free agent. On August 30, he was waived by Las Vegas as a part of final roster cuts.

=== Carolina Panthers ===
On September 17, 2026, Williams signed with the Carolina Panthers' practice squad. On September 22, he was released by the Panthers.

== Personal life ==
Williams was born to Eddie and Vontrelle Williams, both of whom served in the military. His father was a U.S. Army veteran who held the title of sergeant first class. He died at the age of 39, when Williams was 8 years old. He stated that his father influenced him into playing football, stating "He loved the game a lot. Every time I came home from school he was on the couch just getting home from work watching football and he really got me into the game at a young age." His older sister, Kahlia Lawrence, played college basketball for the Mercer Bears and was selected 24th overall in the 2018 WNBA draft by the Minnesota Lynx; she is currently a graduate assistant for the Tulsa Golden Hurricane women's basketball team. Williams and Lawrence were classmates when they previously lived in El Paso, Texas. However, after their father's death, the family moved to Columbus, Georgia where Williams began his football career later at Clemson.

Williams and his father were Georgia Bulldogs football fans growing up. He idolized NFL running back Todd Gurley and wide receiver A. J. Green. He is close friends with Justyn Ross, a two-time Super Bowl champion with the Kansas City Chiefs who was a teammate in Central High School and Clemson.

He received his bachelor's degree in liberal studies and a minor degree in communications from Indiana University.
