= Mike Katic =

American football player (born 2000)

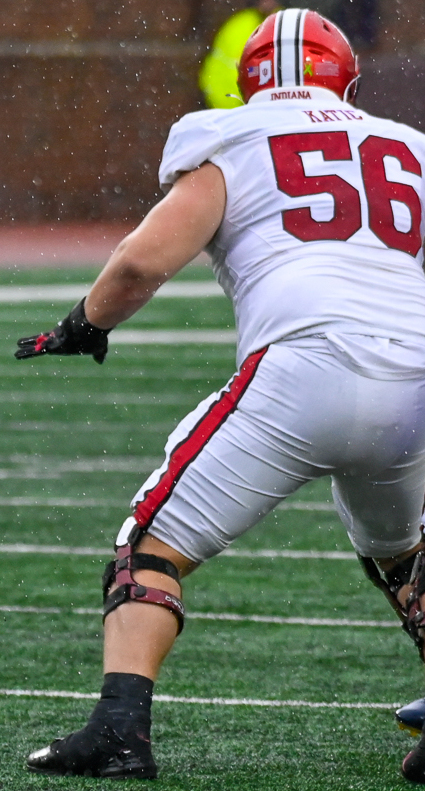
- Katic in 2023

No. 56
- Positions: Center, Left guard

Personal information
- Born: December 20, 2000 (age 25)
- Listed height: 6 ft 4 in (1.93 m)
- Listed weight: 318 lb (144 kg)

Career information
- High school: Pine Richland (Pittsburgh, Pennsylvania)
- College: Indiana (2019–2024)

Awards and highlights
- Third-team All-Big Ten (2024); Big Ten Sportsmanship Award

Michael Katic (born December 20, 2000) is an American social media personality and former college football center for the Indiana Hoosiers.

== Early life ==
Katic was born on December 20, 2000, to Mike and Mary Beth Katic. He went to Pine Richland High School in Gibsonia, Pennsylvania. He was selected to the Pittsburgh Post-Gazette Fabulous 22 team and led the team to the 2017 state championship, the 2018 state semifinals, and back-to-back conference titles.

Graduating from high school in 2019, he was ranked as the 55th best offensive guard in the country and the 22nd best player in Pennsylvania, by 247Sports. He committed to Indiana University in Bloomington, Indiana on June 17, 2018.

== College career ==
Katic redshirted his freshman year at Indiana University. In 2020 which was his redshirt freshman year, he appeared in six games with four starts at left guard for the 2020 Indiana Hoosiers. He was named Indiana's Offensive Newcomer of the Year.

As a sophomore in 2021, Katic began all nine games at left guard and missed three games to injury. As a junior in 2022, he started all 12 games at left guard. In 2023, his senior year, he started all 12 games at left guard and was the captain.

In 2024, his redshirt senior season, he earned third team All-Big Ten honors, won the Big Ten Sportsmanship Award, and was the captain of the 2024 Indiana Hoosiers. He helped lead Indiana to its best season ever at the time with a record of 11–1. Katic initially declared for the NFL draft after his 2023 season, but changed his mind after he was recruited by Bob Bostad to play for his sixth Covid year. Bostad, Indiana's offensive line coach, convinced Katic to move to center for his final season.

== Media career ==
After graduating from Indiana University with a degree in criminal justice, Katic was hired by and began working at Barstool Sports, in 2025. He is a co-host of the Friday edition of Wake Up Barstool, along with T-Bob Hebert and Dana Beers. Katic portrayed the AFC South Commissioner in a skit with Dan Katz ("Big Cat") for Fox NFL Sunday.
