= Jamari Sharpe =

American football player (born 2003)

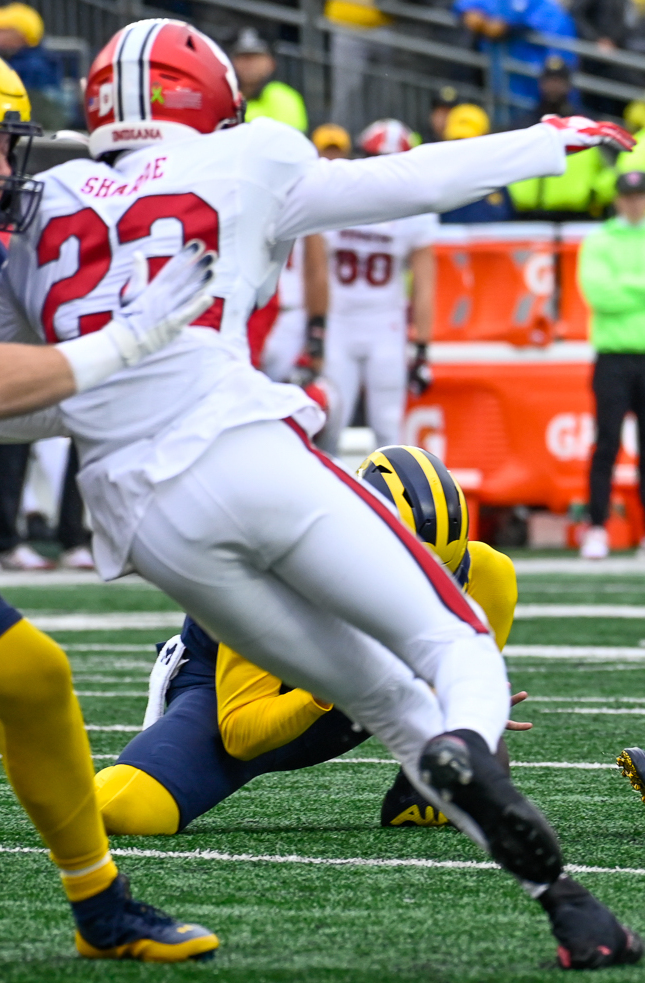
- Sharpe in 2023

No. 22 – Indiana Hoosiers
- Position: Defensive back
- Class: Redshirt Senior

Personal information
- Born: September 22, 2003 (age 23); Miami, Florida, U.S.
- Listed height: 6 ft 1 in (1.85 m)
- Listed weight: 188 lb (85 kg)

Career information
- High school: Miami Northwestern
- College: Indiana (2022–present)

Awards and highlights
- CFP national champion (2025)
- Stats at ESPN

Jamari Sharpe (born September 22, 2003) is an American college football defensive back for the Indiana Hoosiers.

== Early life ==
Sharpe was born September 22, 2003, in Miami, Florida. He attended Miami Northwestern Senior High School, where he played wide receiver on the school's football team before changing to cornerback in his senior year. Sharpe and Northwestern won a state championship in 2019. He also competed in track and field, placing sixth in the 100-meter dash and second on the 4 × 100 team at state finals.

== College career ==
A three-star college football recruit, Sharpe committed to play for the Indiana Hoosiers beginning in 2022 as part of the school's highest-ranked recruiting class in program history. He redshirted the 2022 season after appearing in three games. In 2023, he played in all 12 games with nine starts, recording 22 tackles, three pass breakups, and one interception. He appeared in nine games with three starts in 2024, including a start in Indiana's 2024–25 College Football Playoff game against the Notre Dame Fighting Irish, recording 13 tackles, six pass breakups, one fumble recovery, and 0.5 sacks on the season.

Sharpe was named the likely starter for the 2025 season by head coach Curt Cignetti during preseason training camp. In a win against the Oregon Ducks, as Sharpe left the field with an injury, the broadcast showed Cignetti appearing to tell Sharpe to "toughen up"; Sharpe returned to the game one play later. Sharpe caught the game-sealing interception of a Carson Beck pass against the Miami Hurricanes in the 2026 College Football Playoff National Championship, which won Indiana their first national championship in program history.

== Personal life ==
Sharpe's uncle, Glenn Sharpe, played college football for the Miami Hurricanes. Jamari's game-sealing interception that denied Miami the 2025 national championship marked the closest Miami had come to winning a championship since 2002, when Glenn committed a penalty in overtime of the 2003 BCS National Championship Game against the Ohio State Buckeyes; the penalty extended the game, which Miami lost.
