= Omar Cooper Jr. =

American football player (born 2003)

No. 11 – New York Jets
- Position: Wide receiver
- Roster status: Active

Personal information
- Born: December 14, 2003 (age 22)
- Listed height: 6 ft 0 in (1.83 m)
- Listed weight: 199 lb (90 kg)

Career information
- High school: Lawrence North (Indianapolis, Indiana)
- College: Indiana (2022–2025)
- NFL draft: 2026: 1st round, 30th overall pick

Career history
- New York Jets (2026–present)

Awards and highlights
- CFP national champion (2025); Second-team All-Big Ten (2025)

Career NFL statistics as of Week 10, 2026
- Receptions: 20
- Receiving yards: 306
- Receiving touchdowns: 2
- Stats at Pro Football Reference

Omar Cooper Jr. (born December 14, 2003) is an American professional football wide receiver for the New York Jets of the National Football League (NFL). He played college football for the Indiana Hoosiers, winning the 2026 national championship, and was selected by the Jets in the first round of the 2026 NFL draft.

== Early life ==
Cooper was born on December 14, 2003, and grew up in Indianapolis, Indiana. He attended Lawrence North High School, where he was a three-sport athlete, starring in football, basketball, and long jump. During his senior year, he hauled in 43 passes for 702 yards and seven touchdowns, while also averaging 9.3 points, 6.6 rebounds and 2.6 assists a game. Coming out of high school, he was rated as a four star recruit, where he committed to play college football for the Indiana Hoosiers.

== College career ==
During Cooper's first season in 2022, he used the season to redshirt. During the 2023 season, he hauled in 18 passes for 267 yards with two touchdowns. In week five of the 2024 season, Cooper hauled in four passes for 83 yards and a touchdown in a win over Maryland. Cooper finished the 2024 season, recording 28 receptions for 594 yards and seven touchdowns.

In week three of the 2025 season, he recorded ten catches for 207 yards and four touchdowns which tied Indiana's single-game program record, in a 73–0 win over Indiana State. On November 8, in a game against Penn State at Beaver Stadium, Cooper caught a toe-tap touchdown pass from Fernando Mendoza in the final moments of the game, helping the Hoosiers secure their first ever win at Penn State. Cooper finished the season with 69 receptions for 937 yards and 13 touchdowns, the leading receiver on Indiana's first-ever national championship team. After the season, he declared for the 2026 NFL Draft.

=== Statistics ===
College statistics
Year	Team	Games		Receiving				Rushing			
Year	Team	GP	GS	Rec	Yds	Avg	TD	Att	Yds	Avg	TD
2022	Indiana	4	0	0	0	0.0	0	0	0	0.0	0
2023	Indiana	9	2	18	267	14.8	2	0	0	0.0	0
2024	Indiana	13	4	28	594	21.2	7	2	23	11.5	1
2025	Indiana	16	16	69	937	13.5	13	3	74	24.7	1
Career		42	21	115	1,798	15.6	22	5	97	19.4	2

== Professional career ==
Pre-draft measurables
Height	Weight	Arm length	Hand span	Wingspan	40-yard dash	10-yard split	20-yard split	Vertical jump
6 ft 0 1/8 in (1.83 m)	199 lb (90 kg)	30 1/4 in (0.77 m)	9 5/8 in (0.24 m)	6 ft 3 1/4 in (1.91 m)	4.42 s	1.55 s	2.60 s	37.0 in (0.94 m)
All values from NFL Combine

Cooper was selected by the New York Jets in the first round of the 2026 NFL draft with the 30th pick. In his week one debut against the Tennessee Titans, Cooper caught one pass for 30 yards before getting placed on injured reserve with an ankle sprain.

Cooper returned in week six against the New England Patriots, catching six passes for 103 yards. The next week against the Miami Dolphins, Cooper caught 5 passes for 113 yards and a touchdown in a 28–25 loss.

== Personal life ==
Cooper is a Christian.
