= Brendan Sorsby =

American football player (born 2004)

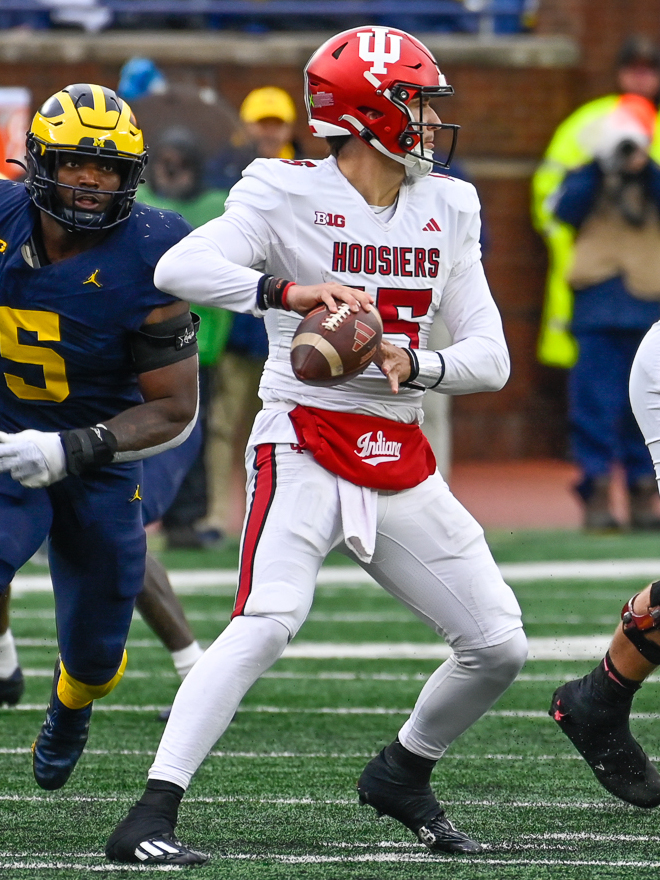
- Sorsby with Indiana in 2023

Profile
- Position: Quarterback
- Class: Redshirt Senior

Personal information
- Born: January 20, 2004 (age 22)
- Listed height: 6 ft 3 in (1.91 m)
- Listed weight: 235 lb (107 kg)

Career information
- High school: Lake Dallas (Corinth, Texas)
- College: Indiana (2022–2023); Cincinnati (2024–2025); Texas Tech (2026)

Awards and highlights
- Second-team All-Big 12 (2025)
- Stats at ESPN

Brendan Sorsby (born January 20, 2004) is an American football quarterback who most recently played for the Cincinnati Bearcats. He previously played for the Indiana Hoosiers. He was initially set to play for the Texas Tech Red Raiders during the 2026 season, but after a legal battle over his sports betting history he parted ways with Texas Tech. Sorsby then applied to and was denied entrance to the 2026 NFL supplemental draft.

== Early life ==
Sorsby grew up in Denton, Texas and attended Lake Dallas High School where he lettered in football and baseball. During high school, he was named the Denton Record-Chronicle 2021 Quarterback of the Year and finished high school by completing 1,271 passing yards with 14 touchdowns and 823 rushing yards with 15 touchdowns. He was rated a three-star recruit and committed to play college football at Indiana over offers from Abilene Christian, Army, Delaware, Fordham, Lamar, Navy, Texas A&M–Commerce, and Western Carolina.

== College career ==
=== Indiana ===
During Sorsby's true freshman season at Indiana University Bloomington in 2022, he appeared in only one game, where he completed three of six passing attempts for eight yards against Penn State. During the 2023 season, Sorsby was named the starting quarterback to start the year. In Week 1 against Ohio State, he completed eight of 16 passing attempts for 58 yards. By the third game against Louisville, he was replaced as the starting quarterback by Tayven Jackson, but returned to the starting role by the Hoosiers' seventh game against Rutgers and remained there for the rest of the season. Sorsby entered the transfer portal on November 27, 2023.

=== Cincinnati ===
On December 6, 2023, he announced his intention to transfer to the University of Cincinnati where he became a member of the Cincinnati Bearcats. Sorsby spent the 2024 season as Cincinnati's primary starter. After a strong start to the 2025 season, Sorsby was named a semifinalist for the Davey O'Brien Award. During the final regular-season game at TCU, Sorsby tied Desmond Ridder for the school record for touchdowns in a season as quarterback with 36 total. Sorsby entered the transfer portal on December 15, 2025.

=== Texas Tech ===
On January 4, 2026, Sorsby announced that he would transfer to Texas Tech University. On February 25, Cincinnati sued Sorsby in the United States District Court for the Southern District of Ohio, claiming that he did not pay a $1 million exit fee required by his previous contract within 30 days of transferring to another school.

Sorsby played in Texas Tech's spring game, before checking into rehab for a gambling addiction. After a legal battle over his eligibility caused by his gambling activity, Sorsby parted ways with Texas Tech, and applied for the NFL supplemental draft. His application was denied in June 2026.

== Gambling scandal ==
On April 27, 2026, Sorsby checked into rehab for a sports gambling addiction; he placed thousands of bets on sporting events using online betting apps, against NCAA rules. On May 18, Sorsby was ruled ineligible by the NCAA due to gambling. On May 26, Sorsby was denied his request for reinstatement for eligibility for the 2026 season.

On May 29, 2026, Sorsby admitted to placing over $90,000 in bets over four years on his own team 40 times and using family and friends' gambling accounts to evade detection. According to court documents filed by Sorsby and his representatives, between September 2 and October 22, 2022, he made at least 40 wagers on Indiana football or individual members of the Indiana football team. The court documents showed that wagers on Indiana stopped at least two weeks before his first game action against Penn State, prior to which he was redshirting. Sorsby denies any allegations of point shaving.

The NCAA denied Texas Tech's appeal for Sorsby's reinstatement on June 5. On June 8, a Texas judge granted Sorsby an injunction against the NCAA, preventing the organization from punishing Sorsby for violating the association's anti-gambling rules. Per the ruling, Sorsby will be suspended for Texas Tech's first two games of the season, a punishment proposed by Sorsby's attorneys. On June 9, the NCAA announced it appealed the judge's decision to the Court of Appeals for the Seventh District of Texas.

On June 15, Sorsby applied for the NFL supplemental draft. Eight days later, the NFL elected not to hold a supplemental draft as Sorsby's "application carries with it a lot of issues". The Canadian Football League also forbade him from signing with any of its teams because "upholding the integrity of the league and ensuring fair competition are paramount to the CFL."

On June 30, a memo was sent to all 32 NFL teams informing them that Sorsby and the NFL Players Association had decided not to sue the NFL for its decision against holding a supplemental draft. Sorsby released a statement on the same day saying that he would now prepare for the 2027 NFL draft.

== Statistics ==
Year	Team	Games			Passing								Rushing			
Year	Team	GP	GS	Record	Cmp	Att	Pct	Yds	Avg	TD	Int	Rtg	Att	Yds	Avg	TD
2022	Indiana	1	0	0–0	3	6	50.0	8	1.3	0	1	27.9	2	-8	-4.0	0
2023	Indiana	10	7	1–6	135	237	57.0	1,587	6.7	15	5	129.9	113	276	2.4	4
2024	Cincinnati	12	12	5–7	249	389	64.0	2,813	7.2	18	7	136.4	105	447	4.3	9
2025	Cincinnati	12	12	7–5	207	336	61.6	2,800	8.3	27	5	155.1	100	580	5.8	9
Career		35	31	13–18	594	968	61.4	7,208	7.4	60	18	140.65	320	1,295	4.0	22
