= Nic Toomer =

American gridiron football player (born 2000)

- Toomer with the Toronto Argonauts in 2026

No. 43 – Toronto Argonauts
- Position: Defensive back
- Roster status: Active
- CFL status: American

Personal information
- Born: October 13, 2000 (age 26)
- Listed height: 6 ft 2 in (1.88 m)
- Listed weight: 200 lb (91 kg)

Career information
- High school: Sandy Creek (Tyrone, Georgia)
- College: Stanford (2019–2022); Indiana (2023–2024)
- NFL draft: 2025: undrafted

Career history
- Toronto Argonauts (2025–present)
- Stats at CFL.ca

Nicolas Toomer (born October 13, 2000) is an American professional football defensive back for the Toronto Argonauts of the Canadian Football League (CFL). He played college football for the Stanford Cardinal and Indiana Hoosiers.

== Early life ==
Toomer was born on October 13, 2000. He attended Sandy Creek High School in Tyrone, Georgia, where he had 36 tackles and five interceptions as a senior.

== College career ==
Toomer played college football for the Stanford Cardinal from 2019 to 2022 and Indiana Hoosiers from 2023 to 2024. He played in 21 games at Stanford, recording 29 tackles, including one for loss and five pass break ups. Prior to the 2023 season, Toomer transferred to Indiana University. In 14 games, he had 26 tackles, including three for loss, one sack, one interception and three pass deflections.

== Professional career ==
Pre-draft measurables
Height	Weight	Arm length	Hand span	Wingspan	40-yard dash	10-yard split	20-yard split	20-yard shuttle	Three-cone drill	Vertical jump	Broad jump
6 ft 1 in (1.85 m)	200 lb (91 kg)	32 7/8 in (0.84 m)	9 1/2 in (0.24 m)	6 ft 6 5/8 in (2.00 m)	4.54 s	1.52 s	2.57 s	4.45 s	7.00 s	40 in (1.02 m)	10 ft 7 in (3.23 m)
All values from Pro day

After not being selected in the 2025 NFL draft, Toomer signed with the Toronto Argonauts of the Canadian Football League (CFL) to the practice roster. On November 26, he was re-signed by the team. On May 21, 2026, Toomer was released. On September 21, he was signed to the practice roster. On October 15, Toomer was elevated to the active roster and made his CFL debut the following day against the Ottawa Redblacks. He made five tackles in 39–40 loss.
