= DeQuece Carter =

American football player (born 2001)

Dequece Carter
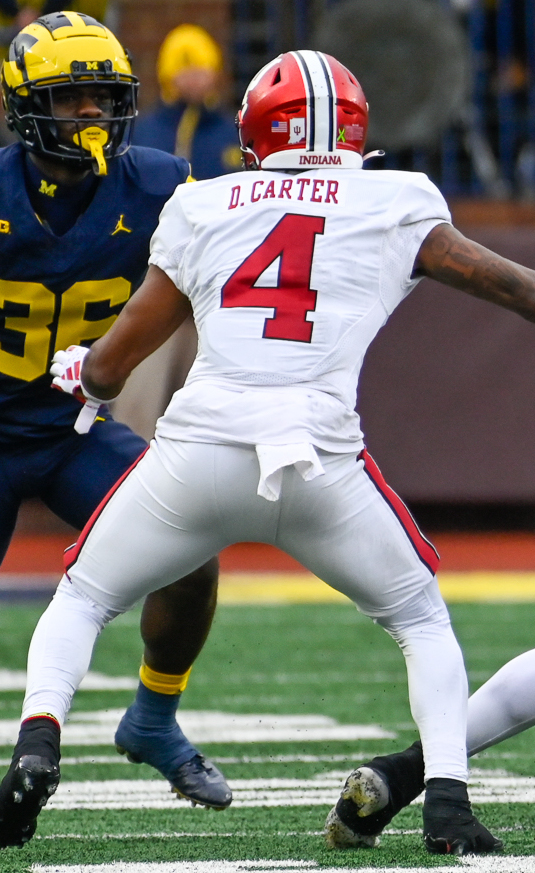
- Carter with Indiana in 2023

Profile
- Position: Wide receiver

Personal information
- Born: April 25, 2001 (age 25)
- Listed height: 6 ft 0 in (1.83 m)
- Listed weight: 200 lb (91 kg)

Career information
- High school: Woodberry Forest School (Woodberry Forest, Virginia)

Awards and highlights
- 3x First team All-Patriot League (2020–2022)

DeQuece Carter (born April 25, 2001) is an American wide receiver. He previously played for the Fordham Rams and the Indiana Hoosiers.

== Early life ==
Carter grew up in Louisa, Virginia and attended Woodberry Forest School. During his senior year, he had 58 receptions, 1,067 yards and 11 touchdowns and was named the Virginia Prep School Player of the Year. He was rated a two-star recruit and committed to play college football at Fordham over offers from Appalachian State and Tulane.

== College career ==
=== Fordham ===
During Carter's true freshman season in 2019, he played and started all 12 games and finished the season by receiving 53 catches for 723 yards and five touchdowns and was named a HERO Sports Freshman All-American. During the 2020-21 season, he played and started all three games as a wide receiver. He finished the season with 19 caught passes for 274 yards and two touchdowns and was named on the First Team All-Patriot League. During the 2021 season, he played and started all 11 games as a wide receiver. He finished the season with 48 caught passes for 872 yards and 11 touchdowns and was named on the First Team All-Patriot League for the second consecutive year. During the 2022 season, he played and started all 12 games as a wide receiver. He finished the season with 56 caught passes for 1,166 yards and 13 touchdowns and was named on the First Team All-Patriot League for the third consecutive year.

On November 29, 2022, it was announced that Carter would be entering the transfer portal. On January 7, 2023, Carter announced that he would be transferring to Indiana.

=== Indiana ===
During the 2023 season, he caught a pass to convert in the fourth overtime during the Week 4 game against Akron to take the 29–27 win.

== Professional career ==
Pre-draft measurables
Height	Weight	Arm length	Hand span	40-yard dash	10-yard split	20-yard split	20-yard shuttle	Three-cone drill	Vertical jump	Broad jump	Bench press
5 ft 11 1/2 in (1.82 m)	199 lb (90 kg)	31 in (0.79 m)	9 3/4 in (0.25 m)	4.48 s	1.52 s	2.60 s	4.19 s	7.12 s	34.0 in (0.86 m)	9 ft 11 in (3.02 m)	12 reps
All values from Pro Day

After going unselected in the 2024 NFL draft, Carter attended rookie minicamp on a tryout basis with the New York Giants.
