= Bob Bostad =

American football player and coach (born 1966)

Current position
- Title: Offensive line coach & run game coordinator
- Team: Indiana
- Conference: Big Ten

Biographical details
- Born: September 7, 1966 (age 59); Pardeeville, Wisconsin, U.S.

Playing career
- 1986–1989: Wisconsin–Stevens Point
- Position: Linebacker

Coaching career (HC unless noted)
- 1990–1991: Wisconsin–Stevens Point (OL)
- 1992–1994: Minnesota (GA)
- 1995–1996: Cal State Northridge (OL)
- 1997: San Jose State (OL)
- 1998: San Jose State (co-OC/OL)
- 1999–2005: New Mexico (OL)
- 2006–2007: Wisconsin (RGC/TE)
- 2008–2011: Wisconsin (RGC/OL)
- 2012–2013: Tampa Bay Buccaneers (OL)
- 2014–2015: Tennessee Titans (OL)
- 2016: Northern Illinois (TE/FB)
- 2017–2021: Wisconsin (ILB)
- 2022: Wisconsin (OL)
- 2023–present: Indiana (RGC/OL)

Bob Bostad (born September 7, 1966) is the run game coordinator and offensive line coach for Indiana University.

== Education ==
Bostad graduated from the University of Wisconsin-Stevens Point in 1989 with a degree in Physical Education. In 1994, he received his master's degree in Kinesiology from the University of Minnesota.

== Coaching career ==
Bostad's first coaching job was as Offensive Line Coach at the University of Wisconsin-Stevens Point from 1990 to 1991. From there he served in the same position at California State University, Northridge before becoming a graduate assistant at the University of Minnesota. He served as Offensive Line Coach and offensive coordinator of the San Jose State Spartans and offensive line Coach of the New Mexico Lobos from 1999 to 2005. Bostad served as the Tight Ends Coach, Offensive Line Coach, and Running Game Coordinator for the Wisconsin Badgers from 2006–2011. Bostad briefly served as the offensive coordinator at the University of Pittsburgh before taking the position of offensive line coach for the Tampa Bay Buccaneers in February 2012. He then spent two seasons coaching with Tampa Bay and two seasons coaching with the Tennessee Titans. He most recently was tight ends and fullbacks coach at Northern Illinois in 2016, before taking the job as inside linebackers coach with the Badgers in February 2017.

In December of 2022, Bostad accepted the offensive line coach job at Indiana.

== Personal life ==
Bostad is a native of Pardeeville, Wisconsin. He has three daughters: Rachel, Bryn and Annika, and a son, John.
