= Aaron Casey =

American gridiron football player (born 2000)

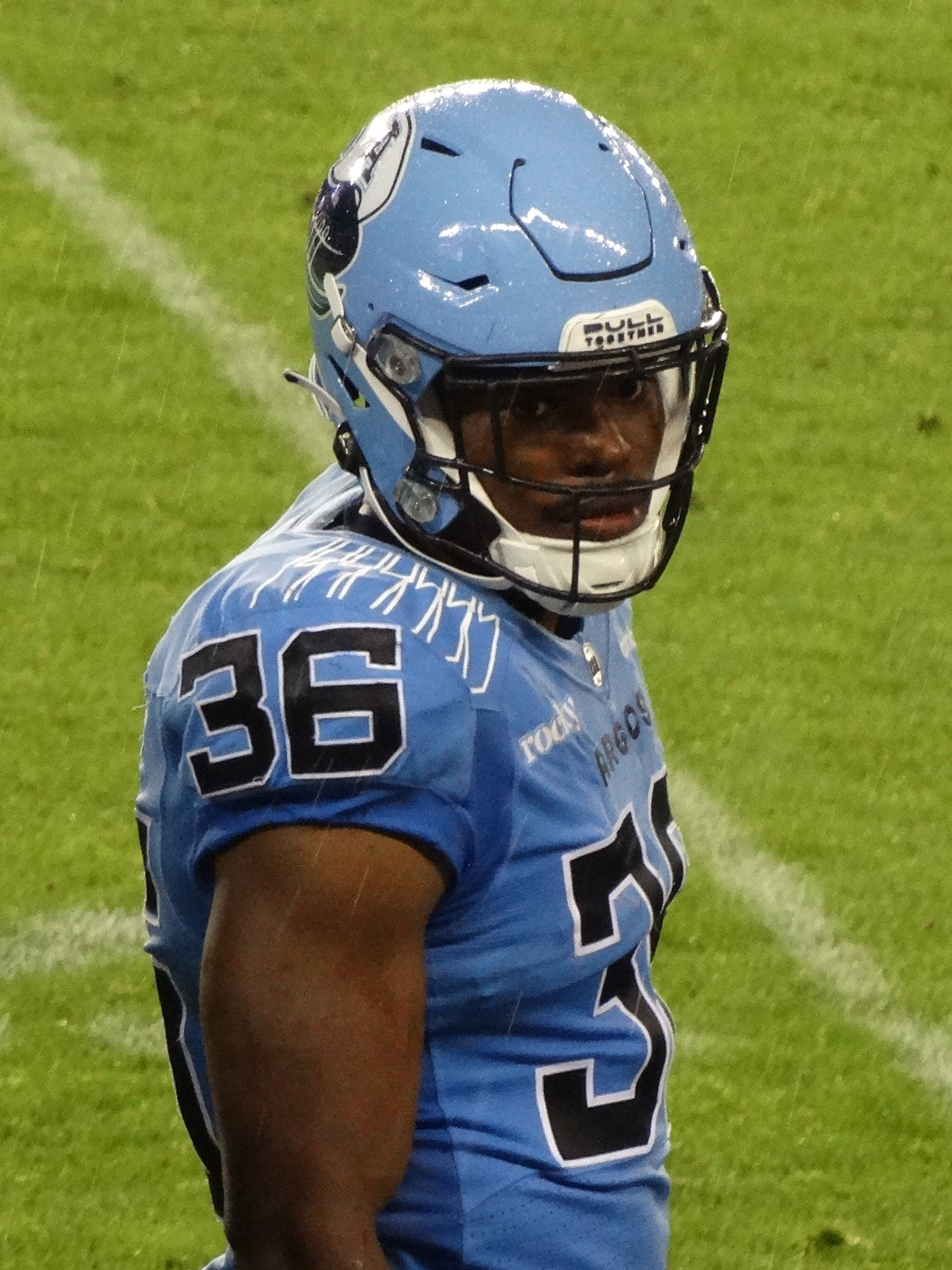
- Casey with the Toronto Argonauts in 2025

Ottawa Redblacks
- Position: Linebacker
- Roster status: Practice roster
- CFL status: American

Personal information
- Born: June 12, 2000 (age 26); Douglasville, Georgia, U.S.
- Listed height: 6 ft 2 in (1.88 m)
- Listed weight: 235 lb (107 kg)

Career information
- High school: Alexander (Douglasville, Georgia)
- College: Indiana (2018–2023)
- NFL draft: 2024: undrafted

Career history
- Cincinnati Bengals (2024)*; Toronto Argonauts (2025); Ottawa Redblacks (2026–present)
- * Offseason or practice squad member only

Awards and highlights
- First-team All-Big Ten (2023)
- Stats at CFL.ca

Aaron Casey (born June 12, 2000) is an American professional football linebacker for the Ottawa Redblacks of the Canadian Football League (CFL). He played college football at Indiana and was signed as an undrafted free agent in 2024 by the Cincinnati Bengals.

== Early life ==
Casey was born in Douglasville, Georgia where he attended high school at Alexander. In Casey's high school career, he notched 225 tackles, nine interceptions, four fumble recoveries, and four forced fumbles. Casey committed to play college football for the Indiana Hoosiers.

== College career ==
In Casey's first season in 2019, he totaled five tackles (1.5 for a loss) and a sack. In 2020, Casey had 15 tackles (three for a loss) and a sack. In 2021, Casey finished the season with 25 tackles and one tackle for a loss. Casey took a step up in 2022, becoming a full time starter where he recorded 86 tackles (10.5 for a loss), one and a half sacks, and two forced fumbles. In the 2023 preseason, Casey was named to the Butkus Award watch list. In week one of the 2023 season, Casey notched 11 tackles with one being for a loss against Ohio State. In week ten, Casey had a career performance totaling nine tackles (four for a loss) and two sacks versus Wisconsin. In Indiana's 2023 season finale, Casey tallied 11 tackles (four for a loss) and a sack, but the Hoosiers lost to Purdue.

== Professional career ==
Pre-draft measurables
Height	Weight	Arm length	Hand span	Wingspan	40-yard dash	10-yard split	20-yard split	20-yard shuttle	Three-cone drill	Vertical jump	Broad jump	Bench press
6 ft 0 7/8 in (1.85 m)	231 lb (105 kg)	32 3/4 in (0.83 m)	9 3/8 in (0.24 m)	6 ft 5 7/8 in (1.98 m)	4.72 s	1.62 s	2.68 s	4.40 s	7.09 s	34.0 in (0.86 m)	9 ft 9 in (2.97 m)	16 reps
All values from NFL Combine/Pro Day

=== Cincinnati Bengals ===
After not being selected in the 2024 NFL draft, Casey signed with the Cincinnati Bengals as an undrafted free agent on April 27, 2024. On August 23, he was released by the Bengals.

=== Toronto Argonauts ===
On June 17, 2025, it was announced that Casey had signed with the Toronto Argonauts. He was released on May 31, 2026, as part of final roster cuts.

=== Ottawa Redblacks ===
On June 1, 2026, Casey signed with the Ottawa Redblacks.
