= Bray Lynch =

American football player (born 2004)

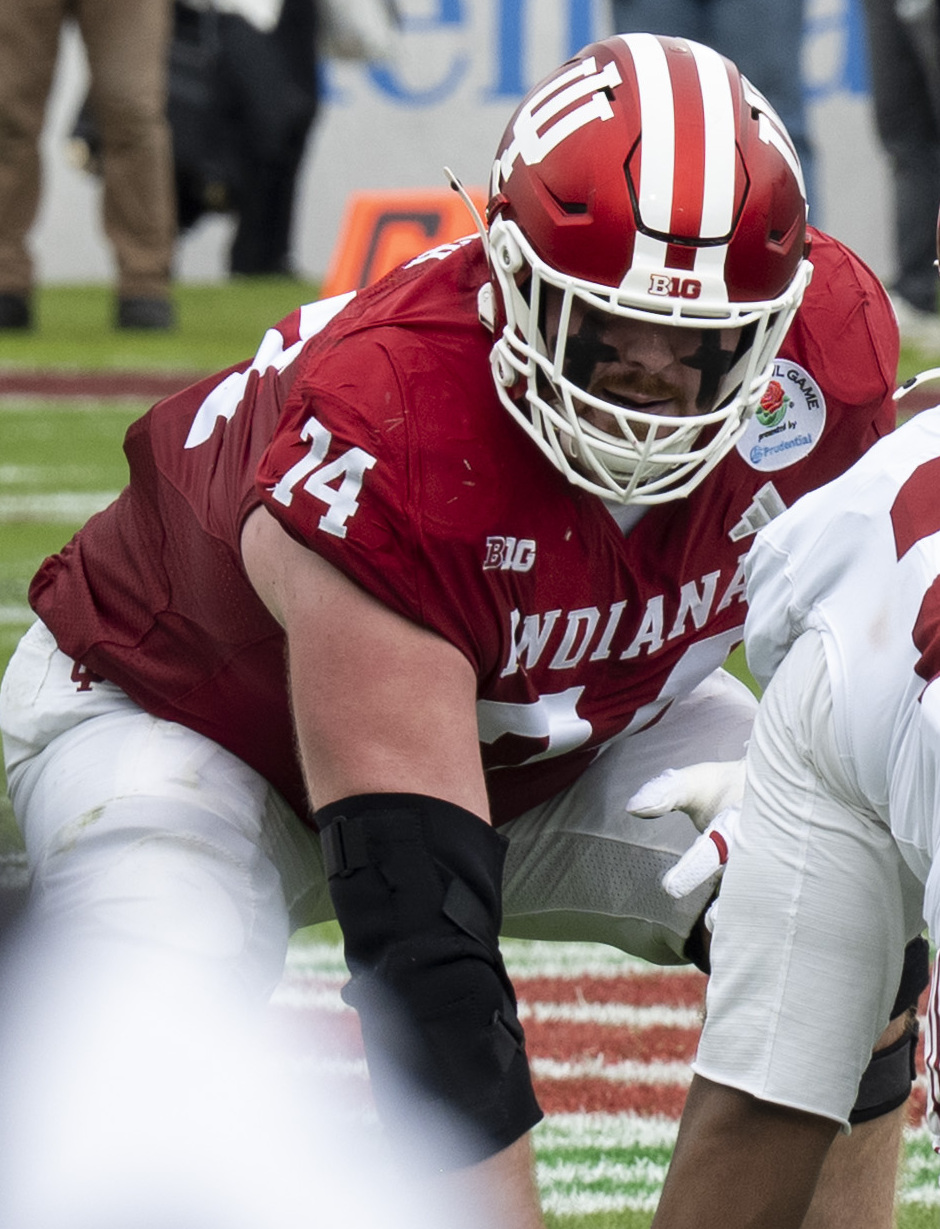
- Lynch in 2026

No. 74 – Indiana Hoosiers
- Position: Offensive lineman
- Class: Redshirt Junior

Personal information
- Born: July 31, 2004 (age 22); Austin, Texas, U.S.
- Listed height: 6 ft 5 in (1.96 m)
- Listed weight: 307 lb (139 kg)

Career information
- High school: Westlake (Austin)
- College: Indiana (2022–present)

Awards and highlights
- CFP national champion (2025)
- Stats at ESPN

Brayden Lynch (born July 31, 2004) is an American college football offensive lineman for the Indiana Hoosiers.

== Early life ==
Lynch was born July 31, 2004 in Austin, Texas. He attended and played high school football at Westlake High School in Austin; he played left tackle on an offensive line that protected quarterback Cade Klubnik. He and Westlake won three straight state championships from 2019 to 2021; Lynch was named an All-American by MaxPreps and earned first-team all-state honors in 2021. He also competed in track and field at Westlake. A three-star college football recruit per 247Sports, Lynch committed to play for the Indiana Hoosiers over offers from 13 other programs.

== College career ==
Lynch redshirted the 2022 season after appearing in four games. He played five games in 2023 on the offensive line and special teams. Lynch earned a starting role at right guard in 2024, starting in all 13 games of the season. He maintained his starting role into the 2025 season; Indiana finished the season with a win in the 2026 College Football Playoff National Championship.
