= Chad Wilt =

American football coach (born 1978)

Biographical details
- Born: May 6, 1978 (age 48); Carlisle, Pennsylvania, U.S.
- Education: Taylor University (2000); University of Virginia (2006)

Playing career
- 1996–1999: Taylor University
- Position: Defensive end

Coaching career (HC unless noted)
- 2001–2003: Central Connecticut State (DL/STC)
- 2004–2005: Virginia (GA)
- 2006–2008: Liberty (DL/STC)
- 2009: Virginia (DL/STC)
- 2010: Richmond (DL)
- 2011–2013: Ball State (DL)
- 2014–2015: Maryland (DL)
- 2016–2018: Army (DL)
- 2019: Cincinnati (DL)
- 2020–2021: Minnesota (DL)
- 2022: Indiana (DC/LB)
- 2023: Indiana (co-DC/LB)
- 2024–2025: Michigan State (co-STC/DE)
- 2026-present: Kentucky (Inside LB)

Chad Wilt (born May 6, 1978) is an American football coach who was most recently the co-special teams coordinator and defensive ends coach for the Michigan State Spartans.

== Coaching career ==
Wilt got his first career coaching job in 2001 as the defensive line coach and special teams coordinator at Central Connecticut State. In 2004, Wilt joined the Virginia Cavaliers as a graduate assistant. In 2006, Wilt was hired by the Liberty Flames to serve as the team's special teams coordinator and defensive line coach. In 2009, Wilt again joined Virginia, this time to serve as the defensive line coach and special teams coordinator. In 2010, the Richmond Spiders hired Wilt to be the team's defensive line coach. In 2011, Ball State hired Wilt to coach the team's defensive line. In 2014, Wilt was hired as the defensive line coach for the Maryland Terrapins. In 2016, Wilt became the defensive line coach for the Army Black Knights. For the 2019 season, Wilt joined the Cincinnati Bearcats to coach the team's defensive line. In 2020, Wilt was hired by the Minnesota Golden Gophers to coach the team's defensive line. In 2022, Wilt was hired by the Indiana Hoosiers to serve as the team's defensive coordinator and linebackers coach. For the 2023 season, Wilt transitioned to become the co-defensive coordinator and linebackers coach for the Hoosiers. After Wilt was not retained by new Indiana head coach Curt Cignetti, Wilt was hired by the Michigan State Spartans to be the team's co-special teams coordinator and defensive ends coach.
