= Donaven McCulley =

American football player (born 2003)

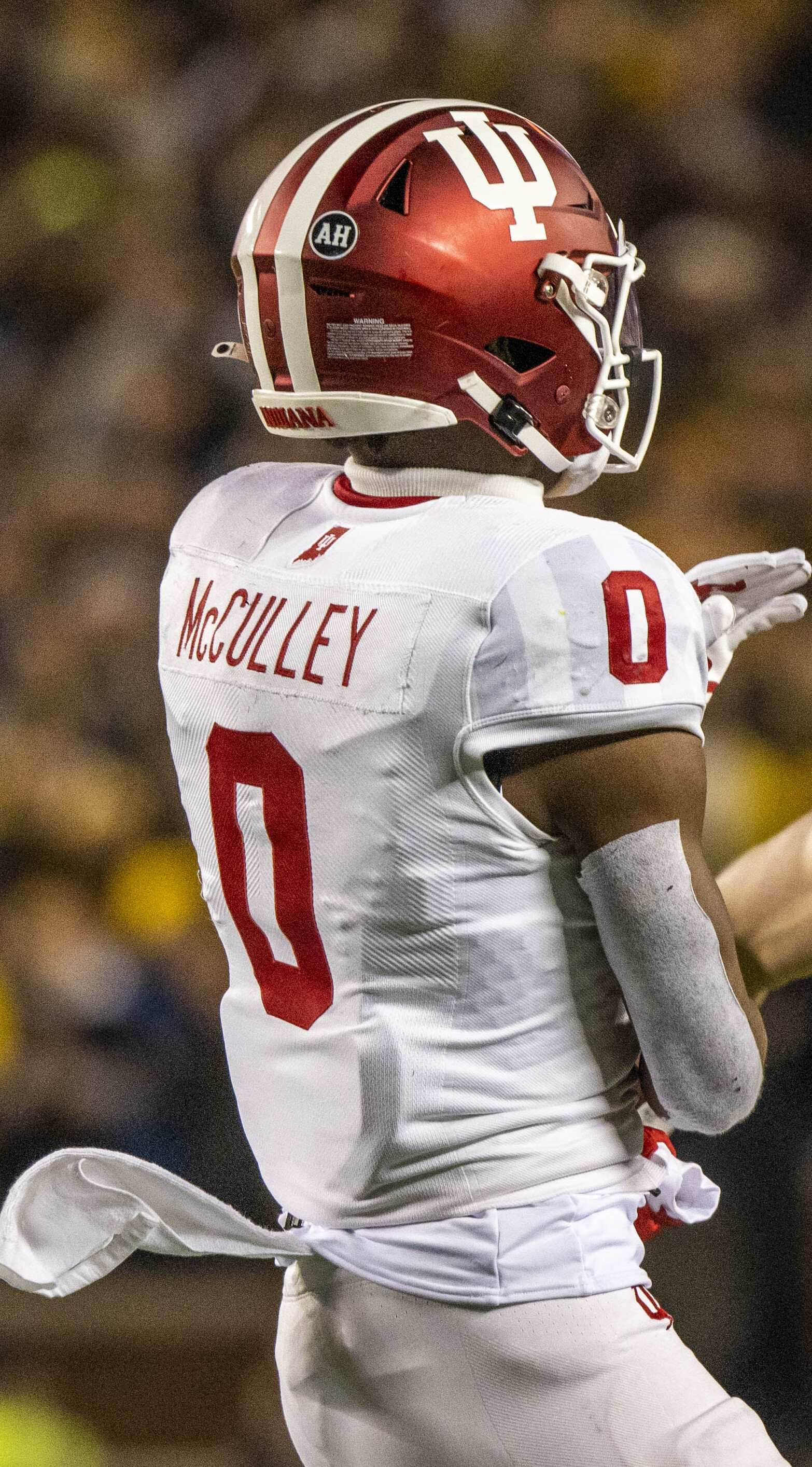
- McCulley with Indiana in 2021

Profile
- Position: Wide receiver

Personal information
- Born: January 15, 2003 (age 23)
- Listed height: 6 ft 4 in (1.93 m)
- Listed weight: 209 lb (95 kg)

Career information
- High school: Lawrence North (Indianapolis, Indiana)
- College: Indiana (2021–2024); Michigan (2025)

Career history
- Miami Dolphins (2026)*
- * Offseason or practice squad member only
- Stats at ESPN

Donaven McCulley (born January 15, 2003) is an American professional football wide receiver. He played college football for the Indiana Hoosiers from 2021 to 2024, and the Michigan Wolverines in 2025. McCulley signed with the Dolphins as an undrafted free agent in 2026.

== Early life ==
McCulley attended Lawrence North High School in Indianapolis, Indiana. As a junior, he completed 63% of his passes for 1,958 yards and 17 touchdowns, while also adding 563 yards and two touchdowns on the ground. Coming out of high school, McCulley was rated as a four-star recruit, the 3rd overall player in Indiana, the 23rd overall quarterback and the 319th overall player in the class of 2021. McCulley committed to play college football for the in-state Indiana Hoosiers over offers from schools such as Purdue, Iowa, Missouri and Ole Miss.

== College career ==
=== Indiana ===
McCulley enrolled at Indiana University in 2021. In week 10, McCulley made his first collegiate start as a freshman, completing 14 of his 25 pass attempts for 242 yards and two touchdowns, while also rushing 11 times for four yards in a 38–35 loss versus Maryland. In his first season, he completed 35 of 82 passes for 475 yards with two touchdowns and two interceptions, also rushing for 135 yards and two touchdowns in seven games for the Hoosiers. Before the 2022 season, McCulley switched his position from quarterback to wide receiver. That season he hauled in 16 receptions for 169 yards and a touchdown. In 2023, McCulley totaled 48 receptions for 644 yards and six touchdowns in his second season as a receiver, earning an All-Big Ten honorable mention. After the season, he entered the NCAA transfer portal after head coach Tom Allen was fired. McCulley soon exited the portal and returned to the Hoosiers under new head coach Curt Cignetti in 2024. Midway through the season, McCulley left Indiana and entered the NCAA transfer portal again, using the year to redshirt. He played in four games and had two catches for 21 yards and a touchdown.

=== Michigan ===
On December 13, 2024, McCulley transferred to the University of Michigan to play for Sherrone Moore and the Wolverines. In game five of the 2025 season against Wisconsin, McCulley had six receptions for a season-high 112 yards and his first touchdown with the Michigan program, a 29-yard pass from Bryce Underwood. He finished the season with 39 receptions for 588 yards and three touchdowns.

== Professional career ==
Pre-draft measurables
Height	Weight	Arm length	Hand span	Wingspan	40-yard dash	10-yard split	20-yard split	20-yard shuttle	Three-cone drill	Vertical jump	Broad jump
6 ft 4 1/2 in (1.94 m)	203 lb (92 kg)	32 5/8 in (0.83 m)	10 1/4 in (0.26 m)	6 ft 8 1/8 in (2.04 m)	4.77 s	1.65 s	2.83 s	4.38 s	7.09 s	33.0 in (0.84 m)	9 ft 8 in (2.95 m)
All values from NFL Combine/Pro Day

On April 25, 2026, McCulley signed with the Miami Dolphins as an undrafted free agent. On August 30, he was waived by the Dolphins as a part of final roster cuts.

== Personal life ==
McCulley's older brother, Derin, played college football for the Ball State Cardinals as a defensive back.
