= 2024 Indiana Hoosiers football team =

American college football season

2024 Indiana Hoosiers football

CFP First Round, L 17–27 at Notre Dame
- Conference: Big Ten Conference

Ranking
- Coaches: No. 10
- AP: No. 10
- Record: 11–2 (8–1 Big Ten)
- Head coach: Curt Cignetti (1st season)
- Offensive coordinator: Mike Shanahan (1st season)
- Co-offensive coordinator: Tino Sunseri (1st season)
- Offensive scheme: Pro Spread
- Defensive coordinator: Bryant Haines (1st season)
- Base defense: Multiple 4–2–5
- Captains: James Carpenter; Justice Ellison; Mike Katic
- Home stadium: Memorial Stadium

2024 Big Ten Conference football standings
| | Conf. | | | Overall |
| Team | W | | L | W | | L |
|---|---|---|---|---|---|---|
| No. 3 Oregon y$^ | 9 | – | 0 | 13 | – | 1 |
| No. 10 Indiana ^ | 8 | – | 1 | 11 | – | 2 |
| No. 5 Penn State y^ | 8 | – | 1 | 13 | – | 3 |
| No. 1 Ohio State #^ | 7 | – | 2 | 14 | – | 2 |
| No. 16 Illinois | 6 | – | 3 | 10 | – | 3 |
| Iowa | 6 | – | 3 | 8 | – | 5 |
| Michigan | 5 | – | 4 | 8 | – | 5 |
| Minnesota | 5 | – | 4 | 8 | – | 5 |
| USC | 4 | – | 5 | 7 | – | 6 |
| Rutgers | 4 | – | 5 | 7 | – | 6 |
| Washington | 4 | – | 5 | 6 | – | 7 |
| Nebraska | 3 | – | 6 | 7 | – | 6 |
| UCLA | 3 | – | 6 | 5 | – | 7 |
| Wisconsin | 3 | – | 6 | 5 | – | 7 |
| Northwestern | 2 | – | 7 | 4 | – | 8 |
| Maryland | 1 | – | 8 | 4 | – | 8 |
| Michigan State† | 0 | – | 6 | 0 | – | 7 |
| Purdue | 0 | – | 9 | 1 | – | 11 |
Championship: Oregon 45, Penn State 37
# – College Football Playoff champion; ^ – College Football Playoff participant; $ – Conference champion; y – Championship game participant; † — NCAA vacated all wins for Michigan State (5–7, 3–6); Rankings from AP Poll

The 2024 Indiana Hoosiers football team represented Indiana University Bloomington during the 2024 NCAA Division I FBS football season. The Hoosiers were led by first-year head coach Curt Cignetti. They played home games at Memorial Stadium located in Bloomington, Indiana, as members of the Big Ten Conference.

This season marked the first time Indiana hosted a Saturday College GameDay in school history, doing so in a game against Washington.

Following a 20–15 home win against Michigan on Week 11, the Hoosiers achieved the first 10-win season in program history, as well as their first 7-win season in conference play. Their 10-game winning streak was snapped in Week 13 after a 38–15 road loss to No. 2 Ohio State. Indiana qualified for the College Football playoff for the first time in school history, which also marked their second-ever appearance in a major bowl or its equivalent and first since the 1968 Rose Bowl. They were defeated in the first round by Notre Dame in the first meeting between the schools since 1991, 27–17. They finished ranked tenth in both media polls, their third-ever appearance in the top 10 of a major media poll. Following the playoff loss to Notre Dame, the Hoosiers would not lose another game until Week 7 of the 2026 season, winning 22 games in a row.

== Offseason ==
Positions key
| ATH | Athlete | C | Center | CB | Cornerback | DB | Defensive back |
| DE | Defensive end | DL | Defensive lineman | DT | Defensive tackle | FB | Fullback |
| FS | Free safety | G | Guard | K | Kicker | KR | Kickoff returner |
| LB | Linebacker | LS | Long snapper | MLB | Middle linebacker | OT | Offensive tackle |
| OL | Offensive lineman | OLB | Outside linebacker | NT | Nose tackle | P | Punter |
| PR | Punt returner | QB | Quarterback | RS | Return specialist | RB | Running back |
| S | Safety | SS | Strong safety | TE | Tight end | WR | Wide receiver |

=== Departures ===
==== Team departures ====
| Name | No. | Pos. | Height | Weight | Year | Hometown | Reason |
|---|---|---|---|---|---|---|---|
| Noah Pierre | 0 | DB | 5' 11" | 180 lbs | (redshirt) Sr.^{+} | Miami, FL | Declared for NFL draft |
| Andre Carter | 1 | DE | 6' 5" | 270 lbs | (redshirt) Sr.^{+} | Detroit, MI | Declared for NFL draft |
| James Monds III | 2 | DB | 5' 11" | 180 lbs | (redshirt) Fr. | Fort Pierce, FL | Entered transfer portal |
| DeQuece Carter | 4 | WR | 6' 0" | 200 lbs | Sr.^{+} | Louisa, VA | Declared for NFL draft |
| Anthony Jones | 4 | OLB | 6' 4" | 255 lbs | (redshirt) Fr. | Las Vegas, NV | Entered transfer portal |
| Dexter Williams II | 5 | QB | 6' 1" | 200 lbs | (redshirt) Jr. | Macon, GA | Entered transfer portal |
| Kobee Minor | 5 | DB | 6' 0" | 185 lbs | (redshirt) Jr. | Dallas, TX | Entered transfer portal |
| Cam Camper | 6 | WR | 6' 2" | 195 lbs | Sr. | Lancaster, TX | Entered transfer portal |
| Phillip Dunnam | 6 | DB | 6' 1" | 190 lbs | So. | Miami, FL | Entered transfer portal |
| Jaquez Smith | 8 | WR | 6' 1" | 195 lbs | (redshirt) So. | Atlanta, GA | Entered transfer portal |
| Jared Casey | 8 | LB | 6' 3" | 225 lbs | R-Sr. | Louisville, KY | Entered transfer portal |
| Myles Jackson | 10 | OLB | 6' 2" | 250 lbs | (redshirt) Jr. | Atlanta, GA | Entered transfer portal |
| Jaylin Lucas | 12 | RB/RS | 5' 9" | 170 lbs | So. | Houma, LA | Entered transfer portal |
| Kamryn Perry | 13 | WR | 5' 9" | 165 lbs | (redshirt) Fr. | Atlanta, GA | Entered transfer portal |
| Broc Lowry | 14 | QB | 6' 1" | 210 lbs | Fr. | Canfield, OH | Entered transfer portal |
| Brendan Sorsby | 15 | QB | 6' 3" | 230 lbs | (redshirt) Fr. | Denton, TX | Entered transfer portal |
| Jordan Grier | 16 | DB | 6' 0" | 205 lbs | Jr. | Ellenwood, GA | Entered transfer portal |
| Louis Moore | 20 | DB | 6' 1" | 190 lbs | Sr. | Mesquite, TX | Entered transfer portal |
| Jordan Shaw | 23 | DB | 6' 0" | 170 lbs | Fr. | Downey, CA | Entered transfer portal |
| Josh Henderson | 26 | RB | 5' 11" | 225 lbs | Sr.^{+} | Pennington, NJ | Declared for NFL draft |
| Trent Howland | 27 | RB | 6' 3" | 240 lbs | (redshirt) So. | Joliet, IL | Entered transfer portal |
| Xavier Trueblood | 27 | LB | 5' 11" | 215 lbs | R-Jr. | Bloomington, IN | Graduated |
| Christian Turner | 28 | RB | 5' 11" | 205 lbs | (redshirt) Sr.^{+} | Buford, GA | Declared for NFL draft |
| Mitchell Evans | 30 | DB | 5' 11" | 195 lbs | R-Fr. | Greenwood, IN | --- |
| David Holloman | 33 | RB | 6' 0" | 205 lbs | (redshirt) So. | Auburn Hills, MI | Entered transfer portal |
| Connor Hole | 33 | DB | 5' 11" | 180 lbs | R-Jr. | Jamestown, IN | Graduated |
| Reece Lozano | 36 | RB | 6' 1" | 195 lbs | R-Fr. | Bloomington, IN | --- |
| Declan McMahon | 37 | RB | 6' 0" | 190 lbs | R-Fr. | Brooklyn, NY | Entered transfer portal |
| Jackson Schott | 37 | OLB | 6' 3" | 200 lbs | R-So. | Greenwood, IN | --- |
| Drew Pearce | 38 | DB | 5' 11" | 195 lbs | R-So. | Tipton, IN | --- |
| Bryce Hendershot | 39 | TE | 6' 3" | 230 lbs | Fr. | North Salem, IN | Entered transfer portal |
| Orlando Greenlow | 40 | OLB | 6' 5" | 220 lbs | Fr. | Lawndale, CA | Entered transfer portal |
| Darryl Minor Jr. | 42 | LB | 6' 0" | 230 lbs | Sr. | Dallas, TX | Entered transfer portal |
| Matt Hohlt | 43 | LB | 6' 2" | 225 lbs | R-So. | Greenwood, IN | --- |
| Aaron Casey | 44 | LB | 6' 2" | 235 lbs | (redshirt) Sr.^{+} | Douglasville, GA | Declared for NFL draft |
| Sam Tallen | 48 | LB | 6' 1" | 225 lbs | R-Fr. | Bloomington, IL | --- |
| Zac Scott | 49 | TE | 6' 4" | 235 lbs | R-Sr. | San Antonio, TX | Graduated/exhausted eligibility |
| Zach Carpenter | 50 | OL | 6' 5" | 295 lbs | (redshirt) Sr. | Cincinnati, OH | Entered transfer portal |
| Patrick Lucas Jr. | 51 | DL | 6' 3" | 315 lbs | (redshirt) Sr. | Prattville, AL | Entered transfer portal |
| Julian Kameristy | 57 | DL | 6' 2" | 260 lbs | (redshirt) So. | Chicago, IL | Entered transfer portal |
| Max Longman | 60 | OL | 6' 4" | 315 lbs | R-Sr. | Portage, MI | Exhausted eligibility |
| Garrett Brown | 61 | OL | 6' 4" | 315 lbs | Fr. | Southlake, TX | --- |
| Josh Witt | 63 | OL | 6' 3" | 315 lbs | So. | Green Bay, WI | Entered transfer portal |
| Noah Bolticoff | 66 | OL | 6' 4" | 315 lbs | R-So. | Southlake, TX | --- |
| Kahlil Benson | 67 | OL | 6' 6" | 310 lbs | (redshirt) Jr. | Southaven, MS | Entered transfer portal |
| Robby Kowalewski | 68 | OL | 6' 5" | 255 lbs | Fr. | Grand Rapids, MI | --- |
| Carl Biddings IV | 69 | DL | 6' 0" | 295 lbs | R-Fr. | East Chicago, IN | Entered transfer portal |
| Bubba Jeffries | 70 | OL | 6' 4" | 305 lbs | Fr. | Greenback, TN | Entered transfer portal |
| Will Larkins | 71 | OL | 6' 5" | 310 lbs | Fr. | Hollywood, FL | Entered transfer portal |
| Matthew Bedford | 76 | OL | 6' 6" | 305 lbs | (redshirt) Sr. | Memphis, TN | Entered transfer portal |
| Joshua Sales Jr. | 77 | OL | 6' 6" | 305 lbs | (redshirt) So. | South Bend, IN | Entered transfer portal |
| Derrick Bohler | 80 | WR | 6' 1" | 195 lbs | Fr. | Miami, FL | Entered transfer portal |
| Chris Freeman | 80 | K | 6' 2" | 205 lbs | (redshirt) Jr. | Zionsville, IN | Entered transfer portal |
| Bradley Archer | 82 | TE | 6' 3" | 245 lbs | R-Sr. | Livermore, CA | Exhausted eligibility |
| Aaron Steinfeldt | 84 | TE | 6' 5" | 250 lbs | (redshirt) So. | Bloomington, IN | Entered transfer portal |
| Anthony Miller Jr. | 85 | TE | 6' 5" | 265 lbs | Fr. | Duluth, GA | Entered transfer portal |
| LeDarrius Cox | 91 | DL | 6' 4" | 305 lbs | (redshirt) Sr. | Mobile, AL | Entered transfer portal |
| Sean Wracher | 95 | LS | 6' 4" | 225 lbs | Sr.^{+} | Akron, OH | Declared for NFL draft |
| Philip Blidi | 96 | DL | 6' 3" | 295 lbs | Sr. | Trenton, NJ | Entered transfer portal |
| Trey Laing | 98 | OLB | 6' 2" | 240 lbs | Sr.^{+} | Tallahassee, FL | Entered transfer portal |
| Nick James | 99 | DL | 6' 2" | 285 lbs | (redshirt) Fr. | Prattville, AL | Entered transfer portal |

==== NFL draft ====
| Player | Position |
|---|---|
| Andre Carter | DL |
| DeQuece Carter | WR |
| Aaron Casey | LB |
| Josh Henderson | RB |
| Noah Pierre | DB |
| Christian Turner | RB |
| Sean Wracher | LS |

==== Outgoing transfers ====
| Name | No. | Pos. | Height | Weight | Year | Hometown | New school |
|---|---|---|---|---|---|---|---|
| James Monds III | 2 | DB | 5' 11" | 180 lbs | (redshirt) Fr. | Fort Pierce, FL | Middle Tennessee |
| Anthony Jones | 4 | OLB | 6' 4" | 255 lbs | (redshirt) Fr. | Las Vegas, NV | Michigan State |
| Dexter Williams II | 5 | QB | 6' 1" | 200 lbs | (redshirt) Jr. | Macon, GA | Georgia Southern |
| Kobee Minor | 5 | DB | 6' 0" | 185 lbs | (redshirt) Jr. | Dallas, TX | Memphis |
| Cam Camper | 6 | WR | 6' 2" | 195 lbs | Sr. | Lancaster, TX | Boise State |
| Phillip Dunnam | 6 | DB | 6' 1" | 190 lbs | So. | Miami, FL | Florida Atlantic |
| Jaquez Smith | 8 | WR | 6' 1" | 195 lbs | (redshirt) So. | Atlanta, GA | Missouri State |
| Jared Casey | 8 | LB | 6' 3" | 225 lbs | R-Sr. | Louisville, KY | – |
| Jayden McDonald | 8 | LB | 6' 0" | 235 lbs | (redshirt) Sr. | Suwanee, GA | UConn (Note: After transferring in from Troy, Jayden McDonald spent the spring with Indiana before transferring to UConn before the season began.) |
| Myles Jackson | 10 | OLB | 6' 2" | 250 lbs | (redshirt) Jr. | Atlanta, GA | Tulsa |
| Jaylin Lucas | 12 | RB/RS | 5' 9" | 170 lbs | So. | Houma, LA | Florida State |
| Kamryn Perry | 13 | WR | 5' 9" | 165 lbs | (redshirt) Fr. | Atlanta, GA | Maryland |
| Broc Lowry | 14 | QB | 6' 1" | 210 lbs | Fr. | Canfield, OH | Western Michigan |
| Brendan Sorsby | 15 | QB | 6' 3" | 230 lbs | (redshirt) Fr. | Denton, TX | Cincinnati |
| Jordan Grier | 16 | DB | 6' 0" | 205 lbs | Jr. | Ellenwood, GA | Memphis |
| Louis Moore | 20 | DB | 6' 1" | 190 lbs | Sr. | Mesquite, TX | Ole Miss |
| Jordan Shaw | 23 | DB | 6' 0" | 170 lbs | Fr. | Downey, CA | Arizona |
| Trent Howland | 27 | RB | 6' 3" | 240 lbs | (redshirt) So. | Joliet, IL | Oklahoma State |
| David Holloman | 33 | RB | 6' 0" | 205 lbs | (redshirt) So. | Auburn Hills, MI | Grand Valley State |
| Declan McMahon | 37 | RB | 6' 0" | 190 lbs | R-Fr. | Brooklyn, NY | – |
| Bryce Hendershot | 39 | TE | 6' 3" | 230 lbs | Fr. | North Salem, IN | Franklin |
| Orlando Greenlow | 40 | OLB | 6' 5" | 220 lbs | Fr. | Lawndale, CA | – |
| Darryl Minor Jr. | 42 | LB | 6' 0" | 230 lbs | Sr. | Dallas, TX | Memphis |
| Zach Carpenter | 50 | OL | 6' 5" | 295 lbs | (redshirt) Sr. | Cincinnati, OH | Miami |
| Patrick Lucas Jr. | 51 | DL | 6' 3" | 315 lbs | (redshirt) Sr. | Prattville, AL | Memphis |
| Julian Kameristy | 57 | DL | 6' 2" | 260 lbs | (redshirt) So. | Chicago, IL | Murray State |
| Josh Witt | 63 | OL | 6' 3" | 315 lbs | So. | Green Bay, WI | Minnesota State |
| Kahlil Benson | 67 | OL | 6' 6" | 310 lbs | (redshirt) Jr. | Southaven, MS | Colorado |
| Carl Biddings IV | 69 | DL | 6' 0" | 295 lbs | R-Fr. | East Chicago, IN | – |
| Bubba Jeffries | 70 | OL | 6' 4" | 305 lbs | Fr. | Greenback, TN | Chattanooga |
| Will Larkins | 71 | OL | 6' 5" | 310 lbs | Fr. | Hollywood, FL | Georgia State |
| Matthew Bedford | 76 | OL | 6' 6" | 305 lbs | (redshirt) Sr. | Memphis, TN | Oregon |
| Joshua Sales Jr. | 77 | OL | 6' 6" | 305 lbs | (redshirt) So. | South Bend, IN | Purdue |
| Derrick Bohler | 80 | WR | 6' 1" | 195 lbs | Fr. | Miami, FL | Stephen F. Austin |
| Chris Freeman | 80 | K | 6' 2" | 205 lbs | (redshirt) Jr. | Zionsville, IN | UConn |
| Aaron Steinfeldt | 84 | TE | 6' 5" | 250 lbs | (redshirt) So. | Bloomington, IN | Albany |
| Anthony Miller Jr. | 85 | TE | 6' 5" | 265 lbs | Fr. | Duluth, GA | Tulane |
| LeDarrius Cox | 91 | DL | 6' 4" | 305 lbs | (redshirt) Sr. | Mobile, AL | UAB |
| Philip Blidi | 96 | DL | 6' 3" | 295 lbs | Sr. | Trenton, NJ | Auburn |
| Trey Laing | 98 | OLB | 6' 2" | 240 lbs | Sr.^{+} | Tallahassee, FL | Eastern Michigan |
| Nick James | 99 | DL | 6' 2" | 285 lbs | (redshirt) Fr. | Prattville, AL | Pittsburgh |

==== Coaching departures ====
| Name | Previous Position | New Position |
|---|---|---|
| Tom Allen | Indiana – Head coach | Penn State – Defensive coordinator / linebackers coach |
| Craig Johnson | Indiana – Associate head coach / running backs coach | None |
| Brandon Shelby | Indiana – Assistant head coach / cornerbacks coach | Kansas – Defensive analyst |
| Rod Carey | Indiana – Interim offensive coordinator / quarterbacks coach | None |
| Anthony Tucker | Indiana – Co-offensive coordinator / wide receivers coach | Mississippi State – Assistant head coach / running backs coach |
| Kevin Wright | Indiana – Tight ends coach | None |
| Chad Wilt | Indiana – Co-defensive coordinator / linebackers coach | Michigan State – Co-special teams coordinator / defensive ends coach |
| Matt Guerrieri | Indiana – Co-defensive coordinator / safeties coach | Ohio State – Safeties coach |
| Paul Randolph | Indiana – Defensive line coach | Oklahoma State – Defensive line coach |
| Kasey Teegardin | Indiana – Special teams coordinator / outside linebackers coach | Eastern Michigan – Special teams coordinator / defensive ends coach |

=== Acquisitions ===
==== Incoming transfers ====
| Name | No. | Pos. | Height | Weight | Year | Hometown | Prev. school |
|---|---|---|---|---|---|---|---|
| Shawn Asbury II | 1 | DB | 5' 10" | 199 lbs | Sr. | Palm Beach, FL | Old Dominion |
| Jailin Walker | 2 | LB | 6' 1" | 218 lbs | Sr. | Richmond, VA | James Madison |
| Myles Price | 4 | WR | 5' 9" | 183 lbs | Sr.^{+} | Dallas, TX | Texas Tech |
| Aiden Fisher | 4 | LB | 6' 1" | 233 lbs | Jr. | Fredericksburg, VA | James Madison |
| Ke'Shawn Williams | 5 | WR | 5' 9" | 189 lbs | Sr.^{+} | Philadelphia, PA | Wake Forest |
| D'Angelo Ponds | 5 | DB | 5' 9" | 170 lbs | So. | Miami, FL | James Madison |
| Justice Ellison | 6 | RB | 5' 9" | 210 lbs | Sr.^{+} | Ashburn, VA | Wake Forest |
| Mikail Kamara | 6 | DL | 6' 1" | 265 lbs | (redshirt) Jr. | Ashburn, VA | James Madison |
| Kaelon Black | 8 | RB | 5' 10" | 210 lbs | (redshirt) Jr. | Virginia Beach, VA | James Madison |
| CJ West | 8 | DL | 6' 2" | 317 lbs | (redshirt) Sr. | Chicago, IL | Kent State |
| Jayden McDonald | 8 | LB | 6' 0" | 235 lbs | (redshirt) Sr. | Suwanee, GA | Troy |
| Kurtis Rourke | 9 | QB | 6' 5" | 231 lbs | (redshirt) Sr.^{+} | Oakville, ON | Ohio |
| DJ Warnell Jr. | 10 | DB | 6' 3" | 200 lbs | Sr.^{+} | La Marque, TX | Arizona |
| Terry Jones Jr. | 12 | DB | 6' 1" | 200 lbs | (redshirt) Sr. | Baltimore, MD | Old Dominion |
| Elijah Sarratt | 13 | WR | 6' 2" | 209 lbs | Jr. | Stafford, VA | James Madison |
| Ty Son Lawton | 17 | RB | 5' 9" | 208 lbs | (redshirt) Sr.^{+} | Staten Island, NY | James Madison |
| Solomon Vanhorse | 18 | RB | 5' 8" | 185 lbs | Gr.^{+} | Alpharetta, GA | James Madison |
| Miles Cross | 19 | WR | 5' 11" | 210 lbs | Sr. | Bowie, MD | Ohio |
| Elijah Green | 21 | RB | 6' 0" | 207 lbs | (redshirt) Jr. | Roswell, GA | North Carolina |
| Nahji Logan | 33 | LB | 6' 3" | 226 lbs | (redshirt) Sr.^{+} | Yeadon, PA | UMass |
| Andrew Depaepe | 42 | DL | 6' 5" | 260 lbs | (redshirt) Fr. | Bettendorf, IA | Michigan State |
| Derek McCormick | 43 | K | 6' 3" | 210 lbs | (redshirt) Sr. | Port Charlotte, FL | Louisiana–Monroe |
| Zach Horton | 44 | TE | 6' 4" | 252 lbs | Sr. | Roanoke, VA | James Madison |
| Mark Langston | 47 | LS | 6' 0" | 225 lbs | (redshirt) Sr.^{+} | Savannah, GA | Georgia Southern |
| Nick Kidwell | 55 | OL | 6' 5" | 316 lbs | (redshirt) Sr.^{+} | Knoxville, MD | James Madison |
| Ebon Person | 57 | LB | 6' 3" | 205 lbs | Jr. | Fort Wayne, IN | Anderson |
| Trey Wedig | 75 | OL | 6' 7" | 319 lbs | (redshirt) Sr. | Oconomowoc, WI | Wisconsin |
| Tyler Stephens | 84 | OL | 6' 5" | 311 lbs | Sr.^{+} | Virginia Beach, VA | James Madison |
| James Carpenter | 99 | DL | 6' 2" | 288 lbs | (redshirt) Sr.^{+} | Roanoke, VA | James Madison |

==== Recruiting class ====
College recruiting (2024)
| Name | Hometown | School | Height | Weight | Commit date |
|---|---|---|---|---|---|
| Jah Jah Boyd; ATH | Philadelphia, PA | Roman Catholic High School | 5 ft 10 in (1.78 m) | 175 lb (79 kg) | |
| Jah Jah Boyd; ATH | Recruit ratings: Rivals: 247Sports: ESPN: (80) | | | | |
| Josh Philostin; CB | Palm Beach Gardens, FL | Cardinal Newman High School | 5 ft 11 in (1.80 m) | 170 lb (77 kg) | |
| Josh Philostin; CB | Recruit ratings: Rivals: 247Sports: ESPN: (80) | | | | |
| Tyler Cherry; QB-PP | Greenwood, IN | Center Grove High School | 6 ft 4 in (1.93 m) | 205 lb (93 kg) | |
| Tyler Cherry; QB-PP | Recruit ratings: Rivals: 247Sports: ESPN: (79) | | | | |
| Quentin Clark; ILB | Dublin, GA | West Laurens High School | 6 ft 2 in (1.88 m) | 200 lb (91 kg) | |
| Quentin Clark; ILB | Recruit ratings: Rivals: 247Sports: ESPN: (78) | | | | |
| Christian Peterson; CB | Carmel, IN | Carmel High School | 5 ft 11 in (1.80 m) | 185 lb (84 kg) | |
| Christian Peterson; CB | Recruit ratings: Rivals: 247Sports: ESPN: (78) | | | | |
| Adedamola Ajani; OG | Speedway, IN | Speedway Senior High School | 6 ft 4 in (1.93 m) | 270 lb (120 kg) | |
| Adedamola Ajani; OG | Recruit ratings: Rivals: 247Sports: ESPN: (77) | | | | |
| Austin Leibfried; OT | Mount Horeb, WI | Mount Horeb High School | 6 ft 4 in (1.93 m) | 265 lb (120 kg) | |
| Austin Leibfried; OT | Recruit ratings: Rivals: 247Sports: ESPN: (76) | | | | |
| Mario Landino; DE | Emmaus, PA | Emmaus High School | 6 ft 3 in (1.91 m) | 250 lb (110 kg) | |
| Mario Landino; DE | Recruit ratings: Rivals: 247Sports: ESPN: (76) | | | | |
| Alberto Mendoza; QB-PP | Miami, FL | Christopher Columbus High School | 6 ft 2 in (1.88 m) | 195 lb (88 kg) | |
| Alberto Mendoza; QB-PP | Recruit ratings: Rivals: 247Sports: ESPN: (75) | | | | |
| Daniel Ndukwe; DE | Lithonia, GA | Arabia Mountain High School | 6 ft 2 in (1.88 m) | 215 lb (98 kg) | |
| Daniel Ndukwe; DE | Recruit ratings: Rivals: 247Sports: ESPN: (75) | | | | |
| William Depaepe; DE | Moline, IL | Moline High School | 6 ft 5 in (1.96 m) | 225 lb (102 kg) | |
| William Depaepe; DE | Recruit ratings: Rivals: 247Sports: ESPN: (75) | | | | |
| Evan Lawrence; OT | Danville, IN | Danville Community High School | 6 ft 6 in (1.98 m) | 250 lb (110 kg) | |
| Evan Lawrence; OT | Recruit ratings: Rivals: 247Sports: ESPN: (75) | | | | |
| Charlie Becker; WR | Nashville, TN | Father Ryan High School | 6 ft 2 in (1.88 m) | 190 lb (86 kg) | |
| Charlie Becker; WR | Recruit ratings: Rivals: 247Sports: ESPN: (75) | | | | |
| Khobie Martin; RB | Fishers, IN | Fishers High School | 6 ft 0 in (1.83 m) | 200 lb (91 kg) | |
| Khobie Martin; RB | Recruit ratings: Rivals: 247Sports: ESPN: (74) | | | | |
| Brody Kosin; TE-Y | Clarkston, MI | Clarkston High School | 6 ft 6 in (1.98 m) | 215 lb (98 kg) | |
| Brody Kosin; TE-Y | Recruit ratings: Rivals: 247Sports: ESPN: (74) | | | | |
| Mitch Verstegen; OG | Kaukauna, WI | Kaukauna High School | 6 ft 4 in (1.93 m) | 300 lb (140 kg) | |
| Mitch Verstegen; OG | Recruit ratings: Rivals: 247Sports: ESPN: (73) | | | | |
| Dontrae Henderson; CB | Charlotte, NC | Julius L. Chambers High School | 6 ft 0 in (1.83 m) | 170 lb (77 kg) | |
| Dontrae Henderson; CB | Recruit ratings: Rivals: 247Sports: ESPN: (72) | | | | |
| Rolijah Hardy; ILB | Newport, RI | Naval Academy Preparatory School | 6 ft 1 in (1.85 m) | 230 lb (100 kg) | |
| Rolijah Hardy; ILB | Recruit ratings: Rivals: 247Sports: ESPN: (NR) | | | | |
Overall recruit ranking: Rivals: 65 247Sports: 46 ESPN: NR
Note: In many cases, Scout, Rivals, 247Sports, On3, and ESPN may conflict in their listings of height and weight.; In these cases, the average was taken. ESPN grades are on a 100-point scale.; Sources: "Rivals commits". Rivals.; "ESPN commits". ESPN.; "2024 Team Ranking". Rivals.com.; "247Sports commits". 247Sports.

==== Walk-ons ====
| Name | No. | Pos. | Height | Weight | Year | Hometown | High school |
|---|---|---|---|---|---|---|---|
| Kyler Kropp | 30 | RB | 6' 2" | 194 lbs | Fr. | New Palestine, IN | New Palestine |
| Heath Kizer | 37 | DB | 6' 1" | 202 lbs | Fr. | Indianapolis, IN | North Central |
| Kaden McConnell | 38 | LB | 6' 2" | 215 lbs | Fr. | Greenwood, IN | Center Grove |
| Carter Imes | 39 | LB | 6' 0" | 196 lbs | Fr. | Fishers, IN | Fishers |

==== Coaching acquisitions ====
| Name | Previous Position | New Position |
|---|---|---|
| Curt Cignetti | James Madison – Head coach | Indiana – Head coach |
| Mike Shanahan | James Madison – Offensive coordinator / wide receivers coach | Indiana – Offensive coordinator / wide receivers coach |
| Tino Sunseri | James Madison – Pass game coordinator / quarterbacks coach | Indiana – Co-offensive coordinator / quarterbacks coach |
| Bryant Haines | James Madison – Defensive coordinator / linebackers coach | Indiana – Defensive coordinator / linebackers coach |
| Grant Cain | James Madison – Assistant head coach / special teams coordinator / tight ends coach | Indiana – Special teams coordinator / tight ends coach |
| John Miller | James Madison – Running backs coach | Indiana – Running backs coach |
| Pat Kuntz | James Madison – Defensive line coach | Indiana – Defensive tackles coach |
| Buddha Williams | Colorado State – Defensive line coach | Indiana – Defensive ends coach |
| Rod Ojong | Charlotte – Defensive backs coach | Indiana – Cornerbacks coach |
| Ola Adams | Penn State – Analytics coordinator / defensive analyst | Indiana – Safeties coach / defensive backs coach |

== Preseason ==
=== Spring game ===
| Date | Time | Spring Game | Site | TV | Result | Source |
|---|---|---|---|---|---|---|
| April 18 | 8:00 p.m. | Offense vs. Defense | Memorial Stadium • Bloomington, IN | BTN | Offense 34–25 | |

=== Big Ten media days ===
Although the Big Ten Conference has not held an official preseason poll since 2010, Cleveland.com has polled sports journalists representing all member schools as a de facto preseason media poll since 2011. The 2024 poll was released on July 22, 2024, with Indiana projected to finish 17th overall in the Big Ten standings.

The 2024 Big Ten Media Days were held on July 23–25, 2024 at Lucas Oil Stadium in Indianapolis, Indiana. Coverage of the event was televised on the Big Ten Network and Fox Sports App. Curt Cignetti (HC), Justice Ellison (RB), Aiden Fisher (LB), and Mike Katic (OL) were in attendance to talk to the media on July 25, 2024.

=== Preseason All-Big Ten teams ===
==== Athlon Sports ====
| Player | Position | Class | Team |
|---|---|---|---|
Offense
| Elijah Sarratt | WR | Jr. | 4th |
| Donaven McCulley | WR | Jr. | 3rd |
| Zach Horton | TE | Sr. | 4th |
| Nick Kidwell | OL | (redshirt) Sr.^{+} | 3rd |
Defense
| Mikail Kamara | DL | (redshirt) Jr. | 4th |
| Aiden Fisher | LB | Jr. | 4th |
Special teams
| James Evans | P | Sr. | 3rd |

==== Phil Steele ====
| Player | Position | Class | Team |
|---|---|---|---|
Offense
None
Defense
| Aiden Fisher | LB | Jr. | 4th |
Special teams
| James Evans | P | Sr. | 3rd |

=== Award watch lists ===
| Award | Player | Position | Year | Source |
|---|---|---|---|---|
| Wuerffel Trophy | James Bomba | TE | R-Jr. | |
| Ray Guy Award | James Evans | P | Sr. | |
| Butkus Award | Aiden Fisher | LB | Jr. | |
| John Mackey Award | Zach Horton | TE | Sr. | |
| Lott Trophy | D'Angelo Ponds | CB | So. | |
| Earl Campbell Tyler Rose Award | Myles Price | WR | Sr. | |
| Johnny Unitas Golden Arm Award | Kurtis Rourke | QB | R-Sr. | |
| Fred Biletnikoff Award | Elijah Sarratt | WR | Jr. | |
| CSC Comeback Player of the Year | Solomon Vanhorse | RB | R-Sr. | |
| William V. Campbell Trophy | Cooper Jones | OL | Jr. | |

== Schedule ==
| Date | Time | Opponent | Rank | Site | TV | Result | Attendance |
|---|---|---|---|---|---|---|---|
| August 31 | 3:30 p.m. | FIU* | | Memorial Stadium; Bloomington, IN | BTN | W 31–7 | 44,150 |
| September 6 | 7:00 p.m. | Western Illinois* | | Memorial Stadium; Bloomington, IN | BTN | W 77–3 | 39,082 |
| September 14 | 7:30 p.m. | at UCLA | | Rose Bowl; Pasadena, CA | NBC | W 42–13 | 47,811 |
| September 21 | 12:00 p.m. | Charlotte* | | Memorial Stadium; Bloomington, IN | BTN | W 52–14 | 43,109 |
| September 28 | 12:00 p.m. | Maryland | | Memorial Stadium; Bloomington, IN | BTN | W 42–28 | 48,323 |
| October 5 | 3:30 p.m. | at Northwestern | No. 23 | Martin Stadium; Evanston, IL | BTN | W 41–24 | 12,023 |
| October 19 | 12:00 p.m. | Nebraska^{†} | No. 16 | Memorial Stadium; Bloomington, IN (Big Noon Kickoff) | FOX | W 56–7 | 53,082 |
| October 26 | 12:00 p.m. | Washington | No. 13 | Memorial Stadium; Bloomington, IN (College GameDay) | BTN | W 31–17 | 53,082 |
| November 2 | 3:30 p.m. | at Michigan State | No. 13 | Spartan Stadium; East Lansing, MI (Old Brass Spittoon) | Peacock | W 47–10 | 68,423 |
| November 9 | 3:30 p.m. | Michigan | No. 8 | Memorial Stadium; Bloomington, IN | CBS | W 20–15 | 53,082 |
| November 23 | 12:00 p.m. | at No. 2 Ohio State | No. 5 | Ohio Stadium; Columbus, OH (College GameDay, Big Noon Kickoff) | FOX | L 15–38 | 105,751 |
| November 30 | 7:00 p.m. | Purdue | No. 10 | Memorial Stadium; Bloomington, IN (Old Oaken Bucket) | FS1 | W 66–0 | 53,082 |
| December 20 | 8:00 pm | at (7) No. 5 Notre Dame* | (10) No. 8 | Notre Dame Stadium; Notre Dame, IN (CFP First Round, College GameDay) | ESPN/ABC | L 17–27 | 77,622 |
*Non-conference game; ^{†}Homecoming; Rankings from AP Poll (and CFP Rankings, after November 5) - Released prior to game; All times are in Eastern time; Source:

== Game summaries ==
=== vs FIU ===
FIU Panthers (0–0) vs Indiana Hoosiers (0–0) – Game summary

| Quarter | 1 | 2 | 3 | 4 | Total |
|---|---|---|---|---|---|
| FIU | 0 | 7 | 0 | 0 | 7 |
| Indiana | 14 | 7 | 3 | 7 | 31 |

at Memorial Stadium • Bloomington, Indiana

- Date: August 31
- Game time: 3:30 p.m. EDT
- Game weather: Cloudy • Temperature: 81 °F (27 °C) • Wind: NW at 5 miles per hour (8.0 km/h)
- Game attendance: 44,150
- Referee: Reed Brotherton
- TV announcers (BTN): Joe Beninati (play-by-play), Matt Barkley (analyst), and Shane Sparks (sideline reporter)
- Recap, Game Book

Game information

First quarter

- (9:14) IU – Zach Horton 9-yard pass from Kurtis Rourke, Nico Radicic kick (Drive: 7 plays, 58 yards, 3:51; Indiana 7–0)
- (1:23) IU – Ty Son Lawton 13-yard run, Nicolas Radicic kick (Drive: 9 plays, 76 yards, 4:24; Indiana 14–0)

Second quarter

- (4:53) IU – Ty Son Lawton 2-yard run (Nicolas Radicic kick) (Drive: 16 plays, 93 yards, 8:05; Indiana 21–0)
- (0:48) FIU – Rocky Beers 7-yard pass from Keyone Jenkins, Chase Gabriel kick (Drive: 12 plays, 75 yards, 4:05; Indiana 21–7)

Third quarter

- (5:51) IU – Nicolas Radicic 35-yard field goal (Drive: 13 plays, 68 yards, 6:24; Indiana 24–7)

Fourth quarter

- (1:06) IU – Elijah Green 51-yard run, Nicolas Radicic kick (Drive: 2 plays, 39 yards, 0:49; Indiana 31–7)

Curt Cignetti was coaching his first game at Indiana after leading James Madison to an 11–1 record the previous season. The opening line had the Hoosiers as 25.5-point favorites over FIU for their home season opener at Memorial Stadium in Bloomington, Indiana. The Hoosiers would go on to beat FIU 31–7. Cignetti became the first Hoosiers head coach to win their debut game since Bill Lynch did so against Indiana State in 2007.

| Statistics | FIU | IU |
|---|---|---|
| First downs | 13 | 23 |
| Total yards | 182 | 414 |
| Rushes/yards | 30 / 53 | 39 / 234 |
| Passing yards | 129 | 180 |
| Passing: comp–att–int | 20–29–1 | 15–25–0 |
| Time of possession | 27:20 | 32:40 |

| Team | Category | Player | Statistics |
|---|---|---|---|
| FIU | Passing | Keyone Jenkins | 20/29, 129 yards, 1 TD, 1 INT |
| FIU | Rushing | Kejon Owens | 6 carries, 36 yards |
| FIU | Receiving | Dean Patterson | 5 receptions, 28 yards |
| Indiana | Passing | Kurtis Rourke | 15/24, 180 yards, 1 TD |
| Indiana | Rushing | Elijah Green | 5 carries, 82 yards, 1 TD |
| Indiana | Receiving | Omar Cooper Jr. | 3 receptions, 45 yards |

=== vs Western Illinois ===
Western Illinois Leathernecks (FCS) (0–1) vs Indiana Hoosiers (1–0) – Game summary

| Quarter | 1 | 2 | 3 | 4 | Total |
|---|---|---|---|---|---|
| Western Illinois | 0 | 3 | 0 | 0 | 3 |
| Indiana | 28 | 14 | 14 | 21 | 77 |

at Memorial Stadium • Bloomington, Indiana

- Date: September 6
- Game time: 7:00 p.m. EDT
- Game weather: Cloudy • Temperature: 73 °F (23 °C) • Wind: N at 10 miles per hour (16 km/h)
- Game attendance: 39,082
- Referee: Jeremy Valentine
- TV announcers (BTN): Lisa Byington (play-by-play), Jeremy Leman (analyst), and Melanie Ricks (sideline reporter)
- Recap, Game Book

Game information

First quarter

- (12:53) IU – Andison Coby 38-yard pass from Kurtis Rourke, Nicolas Radicic kick (Drive: 5 plays, 68 yards, 1:58; Indiana 7–0)
- (9:30) IU – Justice Ellison 2-yard run, Nicolas Radicic kick (Drive: 5 plays, 53 yards, 2:22; Indiana 14–0)
- (7:41) IU – Elijah Sarratt 71-yard pass from Kurtis Rourke, Nicolas Radicic kick (Drive: 1 plays, 71 yards, 0:09; Indiana 21–0)
- (2:03) IU – Ty Son Lawton 19-yard run, Nicolas Radicic kick (Drive: 7 plays, 72 yards, 4:11; Indiana 28–0)

Second quarter

- (9:40) IU – Elijah Green 11-yard run, Nicolas Radicic kick (Drive: 9 plays, 67 yards, 4:33; Indiana 35–0)
- (2:27) IU – Kurtis Rourke 1-yard run, Nicolas Radicic kick (Drive: 10 plays, 60 yards, 5:13; Indiana 42–0)
- (0:30) WIU – Antonio Chadha 31-yard field goal (Drive: 12 plays, 69 yards, 1:50; Indiana 42–3)

Third quarter

- (8:58) IU – Justice Ellison 47-yard run, Nicolas Radicic kick (Drive: 4 plays, 69 yards, 1:36; Indiana 49–3)
- (1:02) IU – Tayven Jackson 13-yard run, Nicolas Radicic kick (Drive: 7 plays, 63 yards, 3:46; Indiana 56–3)

Fourth quarter

- (13:34) IU – Omar Cooper Jr. 69-yard pass from Tayven Jackson, Nicolas Radicic kick (Drive: 2 plays, 74 yards, 0:45; Indiana 63–3)
- (11:29) IU – Rolijah Hardy 12-yard interception return, Nicolas Radicic kick (Indiana 70–3)
- (9:10) IU – Charlie Becker 3-yard run, Nicolas Radicic kick (Drive: 3 plays, 10 yards, 1:23; Indiana 77–3)

Indiana was a 44.5-point favorite entering the game against FCS Western Illinois. At halftime, the Hoosiers were up 42–3 before dismantling the Leatherbacks defense in the second half, outscoring them 35–0. The Hoosiers broke multiple school records in the 77–3 victory. Cignetti became the fourth Hoosiers head coach to win their first two outings since 1948. Their 77-point outbreak broke a record that stood since 1901 when Indiana beat Franklin College 76–0. The Hoosiers also put up 701 yards of total offense which broke the previous school record of 692 yards set in 2013 against Purdue.

| Statistics | WIU | IU |
|---|---|---|
| First downs | 8 | 33 |
| Total yards | 121 | 701 |
| Rushes/yards | 26 / 12 | 46 / 323 |
| Passing yards | 109 | 378 |
| Passing: comp–att–int | 13–26–2 | 19–21–0 |
| Time of possession | 25:29 | 34:31 |

| Team | Category | Player | Statistics |
|---|---|---|---|
| Western Illinois | Passing | Nathan Lamb | 13/25, 109 yards, 2 INT |
| Western Illinois | Rushing | Torrance Farmer Jr. | 5 carries, 20 yards |
| Western Illinois | Receiving | Christian Anaya | 5 receptions, 56 yards |
| Indiana | Passing | Kurtis Rourke | 15/17, 268 yards, 2 TD |
| Indiana | Rushing | Justice Ellison | 9 carries, 117 yards, 2 TD |
| Indiana | Receiving | Elijah Sarratt | 6 receptions, 137 yards, 1 TD |

=== at UCLA ===
Indiana Hoosiers (2–0) at UCLA Bruins (1–0) – Game summary

| Quarter | 1 | 2 | 3 | 4 | Total |
|---|---|---|---|---|---|
| Indiana | 14 | 7 | 7 | 14 | 42 |
| UCLA | 0 | 7 | 3 | 3 | 13 |

at Rose Bowl • Pasadena, California

- Date: September 14
- Game time: 7:30 p.m. EDT
- Game weather: Clear • Temperature: 78 °F (26 °C) • Wind: SW at 7 miles per hour (11 km/h)
- Game attendance: 47,811
- Referee: Bryan Banks
- TV announcers (NBC): Noah Eagle (play-by-play), Todd Blackledge (analyst), and Kathryn Tappen (sideline reporter)
- Recap, Game Book

Game information

First quarter

- (8:31) IU – Miles Cross 3-yard pass from Kurtis Rourke, Nicolas Radicic kick (Drive: 12 plays, 75 yards, 6:29; Indiana 7–0)
- (7:28) IU – Ke'Shawn Williams 14-yard pass from Kurtis Rourke, Nicolas Radicic kick (Drive: 3 plays, 17 yards, 0:53; Indiana 14–0)

Second quarter

- (4:21) IU – Justice Ellison 1-yard run, Nicolas Radicic kick (Drive: 12 plays, 90 yards, 5:29; Indiana 21–0)
- (0:42) UCLA – T. J. Harden 1-yard run, Mateen Bhaghani kick (Drive: 9 plays, 78 yards, 3:34; Indiana 21–7)

Third quarter

- (9:37) UCLA – Mateen Bhaghani 28-yard field goal (Drive: 9 plays, 65 yards, 5:19; Indiana 21–10)
- (4:55) IU – Ke'Shawn Williams 3-yard pass from Kurtis Rourke, Nicholas Radicic kick (Drive: 9 plays, 87 yards, 4:36; Indiana 28–10)

Fourth quarter

- (13:13) UCLA – Mateen Bhaghani 34-yard field goal (Drive: 11 plays, 66 yards, 6:37; Indiana 28–13)
- (7:28) IU – Omar Cooper Jr. 23-yard pass from Kurtis Rourke, Nicolas Radicic kick (Drive: 10 plays, 75 yards, 5:45; Indiana 35–13)
- (5:28) IU – Elijah Green 14-yard run, Nicolas Radicic kick (Drive: 4 plays, 40 yards, 1:36; Indiana 42–13)

In this game, UCLA made their Big Ten Conference debut after leaving the Pac-12 Conference. The Hoosiers jumped out with a 14-point lead at the end of the first quarter and they never looked back, beating UCLA by a final score of 42–13. Cignetti became the first Indiana head coach since Bill Lynch in 2007 to win their first three games. The 29-point victory was the largest margin the Hoosiers had beat a Big Ten opponent by since they beat Northwestern 34–3 in 2019.

| Statistics | IU | UCLA |
|---|---|---|
| First downs | 25 | 16 |
| Total yards | 430 | 238 |
| Rushes/yards | 29 / 123 | 26 / 96 |
| Passing yards | 307 | 142 |
| Passing: comp–att–int | 25–33–0 | 15–24–1 |
| Time of possession | 31:34 | 28:26 |

| Team | Category | Player | Statistics |
|---|---|---|---|
| Indiana | Passing | Kurtis Rourke | 25/33, 307 yards, 4 TD |
| Indiana | Rushing | Justice Ellison | 10 carries, 47 yards, 1 TD |
| Indiana | Receiving | Miles Cross | 6 receptions, 90 yards, 1 TD |
| UCLA | Passing | Ethan Garbers | 14/23, 137 yards, 1 INT |
| UCLA | Rushing | T. J. Harden | 12 carries, 48 yards, 1 TD |
| UCLA | Receiving | T. J. Harden | 4 receptions, 41 yards |

=== vs Charlotte ===
Charlotte 49ers (1–2) vs Indiana Hoosiers (3–0) – Game summary

| Quarter | 1 | 2 | 3 | 4 | Total |
|---|---|---|---|---|---|
| Charlotte | 0 | 14 | 0 | 0 | 14 |
| Indiana | 10 | 21 | 14 | 7 | 52 |

at Memorial Stadium • Bloomington, Indiana

- Date: September 21
- Game time: 12:00 p.m. EDT
- Game weather: Sunny • Temperature: 80 °F (27 °C) • Wind: E at 4 miles per hour (6.4 km/h)
- Game attendance: 43,109
- Referee: Larry Smith
- TV announcers (BTN): Guy Haberman (play-by-play), Yogi Roth (analyst), and Rhett Lewis (sideline reporter)
- Recap, Game Book

Game information

First quarter

- (10:12) IU – Ty Son Lawton 8-yard run, Nicolas Radicic kick (Drive: 6 plays, 49 yards, 3:11; Indiana 7–0)
- (4:08) IU – Nicolas Radicic 27-yard field goal (Drive: 9 plays, 47 yards, 3:40; Indiana 10–0)

Second quarter

- (13:47) CHA – CJ Stokes 13-yard run, Stephen Rusnak kick (Drive: 10 plays, 75 yards, 5:21; Indiana 10–7)
- (9:50) IU – Justice Ellison 2-yard run, Nicolas Radicic kick (Drive: 8 plays, 75 yards, 3:57; Indiana 17–7)
- (5:19) CHA – Isaiah Myers 25-yard pass from Trexler Ivey, Stephen Rusnak kick (Drive: 9 plays, 75 yards, 4:31; Indiana 17–14)
- (3:05) IU – Kurtis Rourke 12-yard run, Nicolas Radicic kick (Drive: 5 plays, 75 yards, 2:14; Indiana 24–14)
- (0:26) IU – Ke'Shawn Williams 19-yard pass from Kurtis Rourke, Nicolas Radicic kick (Drive: 7 plays, 50 yards, 1:30; Indiana 31–14)

Third quarter

- (12:13) IU – Ty Son Lawton 5-yard run, Nicolas Radicic kick (Drive: 5 plays, 75 yards, 2:47; Indiana 38–14)
- (3:42) IU – Kaelon Black 21-yard run, Nicolas Radicic kick (Drive: 7 plays, 70 yards, 3:17; Indiana 45–14)

Fourth quarter

- (9:36) IU – Elijah Green 13-yard run, Nicolas Radicic kick (Drive: 8 plays, 52 yards, 2:55; Indiana 52–14)

After finishing the first half with a 31–14 lead, the Hoosiers never let Charlotte score again. Their 21 unanswered points in the second half made way for a 52–14 Hoosiers win. Cignetti became the first Indiana head coach to start their tenure 4–0.

| Statistics | CHA | IU |
|---|---|---|
| First downs | 13 | 29 |
| Total yards | 256 | 510 |
| Rushes/yards | 32 / 137 | 40 / 222 |
| Passing yards | 119 | 288 |
| Passing: comp–att–int | 14–23–0 | 18–27–0 |
| Time of possession | 29:41 | 30:19 |

| Team | Category | Player | Statistics |
|---|---|---|---|
| Charlotte | Passing | Trexler Ivey | 14/23, 119 yards, 1 TD |
| Charlotte | Rushing | Cartevious Norton | 11 carries, 58 yards |
| Charlotte | Receiving | Jairus Mack | 3 receptions, 36 yards |
| Indiana | Passing | Kurtis Rourke | 16/20, 258 yards, 1 TD |
| Indiana | Rushing | Justice Ellison | 9 carries, 58 yards, 1 TD |
| Indiana | Receiving | Myles Price | 3 receptions, 77 yards |

=== vs Maryland ===
Maryland Terrapins (3–1) vs Indiana Hoosiers (4–0) – Game summary

| Quarter | 1 | 2 | 3 | 4 | Total |
|---|---|---|---|---|---|
| Maryland | 0 | 7 | 14 | 7 | 28 |
| Indiana | 0 | 14 | 14 | 14 | 42 |

at Memorial Stadium • Bloomington, Indiana

- Date: September 28
- Game time: 12:00 p.m. EDT
- Game weather: Rainy • Temperature: 65 °F (18 °C) • Wind: NE at 11 miles per hour (18 km/h)
- Game attendance: 48,323
- Referee: Chris Coyte
- TV announcers (BTN): Jeff Levering (play-by-play), Jake Butt (analyst), and Brooke Fletcher (sideline reporter)
- Recap, Game Book

Game information

First quarter

No scoring plays

Second quarter

- (14:55) IU – Myles Price 1-yard run, Nicolas Radicic kick (Drive: 12 plays, 83 yards, 5:26; Indiana 7–0)
- (9:16) MD – Kaden Prather 33-yard pass from Billy Edwards Jr., Jack Howes kick (Drive: 11 plays, 81 yards, 5:34; Tied 7–7)
- (0:38) IU – Omar Cooper Jr. 27-yard pass from Kurtis Rourke, Nicolas Radicic kick (Drive: 3 plays, 63 yards, 0:32; Indiana 14–7)

Third quarter

- (9:52) MD – Dylan Wade 6-yard pass from Billy Edwards Jr., Jack Howes kick (Drive: 10 plays, 75 yards, 5:08; Tied 14–14)
- (7:31) IU – Justice Ellison 19-yard run, Nicolas Radicic kick (Drive: 7 plays, 75 yards, 2:21; Indiana 21–14)
- (7:21) MD – Roman Hemby 75-yard run, Jack Howes kick (Drive: 1 play, 75 yards, 0:10; Tied 21–21)
- (0:40) IU – Elijah Sarratt 13-yard pass from Kurtis Rourke, Nicolas Radicic kick (Drive: 9 plays, 63 yards, 4:23; Indiana 28–21)

Fourth quarter

- (12:24) IU – Donaven McCulley 12-yard pass from Kurtis Rourke, Nicolas Radicic kick (Drive: 5 plays, 65 yards, 2:26; Indiana 35–21)
- (4:09) IU – Ty Son Lawton 14-yard run, Nicolas Radicic kick (Drive: 2 plays, 27 yards, 0:53; Indiana 42–21)
- (2:55) MD – Roman Hemby 12-yard pass from Billy Edwards Jr., Jack Howes kick (Drive: 4 plays, 75 yards, 1:14; Indiana 42–28)

Indiana entered the game as 7.5-point favorites over conference-foe Maryland. The game was tight at half time with Indiana clinging to a 14–7 lead, but the Terrapins were right there for most of the third quarter with both teams scoring 14 points to make it a 28–21 advantage to the Hoosiers going into the fourth quarter. Indiana would score 14 unanswered points before Maryland would find the endzone with 2:55 seconds left in the game. After a three-and-out on Indiana's next possession, Maryland would get the ball with 2:25 left in regulation. The IU defense would make a stop on fourth down giving Indiana the ball back with 1:00 left in the game. Kurtis Rourke would kneel the ball twice as Indiana came away with their first 5–0 start since 1967. Indiana also improved to 3–0 in the conference. It also marked the first time Indiana had beaten Maryland since 2020 and the first time Indiana had scored 30+ points in five straight games since 2000.

| Statistics | MD | IU |
|---|---|---|
| First downs | 19 | 28 |
| Total yards | 401 | 510 |
| Rushes/yards | 30 / 112 | 40 / 151 |
| Passing yards | 289 | 359 |
| Passing: comp–att–int | 26–41–0 | 22–33–2 |
| Time of possession | 29:21 | 30:39 |

| Team | Category | Player | Statistics |
|---|---|---|---|
| Maryland | Passing | Billy Edwards Jr. | 26/41, 289 yards, 3 TD |
| Maryland | Rushing | Roman Hemby | 10 carries, 117 yards, 1 TD |
| Maryland | Receiving | Kaden Prather | 5 receptions, 66 yards, 1 TD |
| Indiana | Passing | Kurtis Rourke | 22/33, 359 yards, 3 TD, 2 INT |
| Indiana | Rushing | Ty Son Lawton | 19 carries, 93 yards, 1 TD |
| Indiana | Receiving | Elijah Sarratt | 7 receptions, 128 yards, 1 TD |

=== at Northwestern ===
No. 23 Indiana Hoosiers (5–0) at Northwestern Wildcats (2–2) – Game summary

| Quarter | 1 | 2 | 3 | 4 | Total |
|---|---|---|---|---|---|
| No. 23 Indiana | 7 | 10 | 7 | 17 | 41 |
| Northwestern | 0 | 10 | 7 | 7 | 24 |

at Martin Stadium • Evanston, Illinois

- Date: October 5
- Game time: 3:30 p.m. EDT
- Game weather: Sunny • Temperature: 76 °F (24 °C) • Wind: SE at 15 miles per hour (24 km/h)
- Game attendance: 12,023
- Referee: Jerry McGinn
- TV announcers (BTN): Chris Vosters (play-by-play), Anthony Herron (analyst), and Dannie Rogers (sideline reporter)
- Recap, Game Book

Game information

First quarter

- (0:44) IU – Justice Ellison 5-yard run, Nicolas Radicic kick (Drive: 10 plays, 89 yards, 5:26; Indiana 7–0)

Second quarter

- (8:48) NU – Cam Porter 8-yard run, Jack Olsen kick (Drive: 10 plays, 53 yards, 6:51; Tied 7–7)
- (4:28) IU – Miles Cross 7-yard pass from Kurtis Rourke, Nicolas Radicic kick (Drive: 8 plays, 75 yards, 4:20; Indiana 14–7)
- (1:08) NU – Jack Olsen 32-yard field goal (Drive: 7 plays, 61 yards, 3:20; Indiana 14–10)
- (0:03) IU – Nicolas Radicic 37-yard field goal (Drive: 8 plays, 56 yards, 1:05; Indiana 17–10)

Third quarter

- (6:44) IU – Ke'Shawn Williams 13-yard pass from Kurtis Rourke, Nicolas Radicic kick (Drive: 9 plays, 87 yards, 4:55; Indiana 24–10)
- (3:13) NU – A. J. Henning 38-yard pass from Jack Lausch, Jack Olsen kick (Drive: 7 plays, 75 yards, 3:31; Indiana 24–17)

Fourth quarter

- (14:54) IU – Nicolas Radicic 28-yard field goal (Drive: 8 plays, 65 yards, 3:19; Indiana 27–17)
- (11:19) NU – A. J. Henning 2-yard pass from Jack Lausch, Jack Olsen kick (Drive: 6 plays, 61 yards, 3:30; Indiana 27–24)
- (6:23) IU – Ty Son Lawton 1-yard run, Nicolas Radicic kick (Drive: 10 plays, 75 yards, 4:56; Indiana 34–24)
- (3:28) IU – Zach Horton 4-yard pass from Kurtis Rourke, Nicolas Radicic kick (Drive: 5 plays, 36 yards, 1:45; Indiana 41–24)

No. 23/24 Indiana came into the game against Northwestern as 12.5-point favorites. After starting slow but eventually getting going, Indiana had a 17–10 lead going into halftime. The teams then exchanged touchdowns in the third quarter. After a field goal by Indiana to start the fourth, the Wildcats answered with a touchdown to cut the lead to 27–24. Indiana would then score the last 14 points to beat Northwestern 41–24. Indiana would improve to 6–0.

| Statistics | IU | NU |
|---|---|---|
| First downs | 27 | 17 |
| Total yards | 529 | 336 |
| Rushes/yards | 32 / 149 | 22 / 93 |
| Passing yards | 380 | 243 |
| Passing: comp–att–int | 25–33–0 | 23–38–0 |
| Time of possession | 32:09 | 27:51 |

| Team | Category | Player | Statistics |
|---|---|---|---|
| Indiana | Passing | Kurtis Rourke | 25/33, 380 yards, 3 TD |
| Indiana | Rushing | Justice Ellison | 14 carries, 68 yards, 1 TD |
| Indiana | Receiving | Elijah Sarratt | 7 receptions, 135 yards |
| Northwestern | Passing | Jack Lausch | 23/38, 243 yards, 2 TD |
| Northwestern | Rushing | Joseph Himon II | 5 carries, 35 yards |
| Northwestern | Receiving | Bryce Kirtz | 10 receptions, 128 yards |

=== vs Nebraska ===
Nebraska Cornhuskers (5–1) vs No. 16 Indiana Hoosiers (6–0) – Game summary

| Quarter | 1 | 2 | 3 | 4 | Total |
|---|---|---|---|---|---|
| Nebraska | 0 | 7 | 0 | 0 | 7 |
| No. 16 Indiana | 7 | 21 | 14 | 14 | 56 |

at Memorial Stadium • Bloomington, Indiana

- Date: October 19
- Game time: 12:00 p.m. EDT
- Game weather: Sunny • Temperature: 65 °F (18 °C) • Wind: SE at 3 miles per hour (4.8 km/h)
- Game attendance: 53,082
- Referee: Mark Kluczynski
- TV announcers (FOX): Gus Johnson (play-by-play), Joel Klatt (analyst), and Jenny Taft (sideline reporter)
- Recap, Game Book

Game information

First Quarter

- (9:35) IU – Justice Ellison 5-yard run, Nicolas Radicic kick (Drive: 8 plays, 75 yards, 5:25, Indiana 7–0)

Second Quarter

- (13:37) IU – Myles Price 7-yard pass from Kurtis Rourke, Nicolas Radicic kick (Drive: 6 plays, 88 yards, 2:19, Indiana 14–0)
- (7:40) NEB - Jacory Barney Jr. 7-yard run, John Hohl kick (Drive: 13 plays, 75 yards, 5:57, Indiana 14–7)
- (3:47) IU - Ty Son Lawton 1-yard run, Nicolas Radicic kick (Drive: 10 plays, 75 yards, 3:53, Indiana 21–7)
- (1:09) IU - Justice Ellison 31-yard run, Nicolas Radicic kick (Drive: 4 plays, 74 yards, 1:17, Indiana 28–7)

Third Quarter

- (6:25) IU - Miles Cross 2-yard pass from Tayven Jackson, Nicolas Radicic kick (Drive: 3 plays, 19 yards, 1:10, Indiana 35–7)
- (1:46) IU - Elijah Sarratt 15-yard pass from Tayven Jackson, Nicolas Radicic kick (Drive: 4 plays, 51 yards, 1:14, Indiana 42–7)

Fourth Quarter

- (13:01) IU – Kaelon Black 10-yard run, Nicolas Radicic kick (Drive: 4 plays, 43 yards, 1:55, Indiana 49–7)
- (3:45) IU - Elijah Green, 1-yard run, Nicolas Radicic kick (Drive 5 plays, 19 yards, 2:28, Indiana 56–7)

No. 16/18 Indiana came into the game against Nebraska as 6.5-point favorites. The Hoosiers also played host to Fox Big Noon Kickoff. Indiana opened the scoring with two touchdowns before Nebraska scored one of their own. The Hoosiers went into the locker room with a 28–7 lead, but their starting quarterback Kurtis Rourke sat out due to a thumb injury. Tayven Jackson stepped in and led the Hoosiers to 28 unanswered points to defeat the Cornhuskers 56–7. The 49-point victory tied the largest margin the Hoosiers had beaten a Big Ten opponent in school history which was accomplished when Indiana beat Minnesota 49–0 in 1945. Indiana's record would improve to 7–0.

| Statistics | NEB | IU |
|---|---|---|
| First downs | 20 | 24 |
| Total yards | 304 | 495 |
| Rushes/yards | 29 / 70 | 33 / 215 |
| Passing yards | 234 | 280 |
| Passing: comp–att–int | 28–46–3 | 24–30–1 |
| Time of possession | 32:08 | 27:52 |

| Team | Category | Player | Statistics |
|---|---|---|---|
| Nebraska | Passing | Dylan Raiola | 28/44, 234 yards, 3 INT |
| Nebraska | Rushing | Heinrich Haarberg | 5 carries, 32 yards |
| Nebraska | Receiving | Thomas Fidone II | 6 receptions, 91 yards |
| Indiana | Passing | Kurtis Rourke | 17/21, 189 yards, 1 TD, 1 INT |
| Indiana | Rushing | Justice Ellison | 9 carries, 105 yards, 2 TD |
| Indiana | Receiving | Miles Cross | 7 receptions, 65 yards, 1 TD |

=== vs Washington ===
Washington Huskies (4–3) vs No. 13 Indiana Hoosiers (7–0) – Game summary

| Quarter | 1 | 2 | 3 | 4 | Total |
|---|---|---|---|---|---|
| Washington | 0 | 7 | 7 | 3 | 17 |
| No. 13 Indiana | 7 | 10 | 7 | 7 | 31 |

at Memorial Stadium • Bloomington, Indiana

- Date: October 26
- Game time: 12:00 p.m. EDT
- Game weather: Sunny • Temperature: 57 °F (14 °C) • Wind: NE at 10 miles per hour (16 km/h)
- Game attendance: 53,082
- Referee: Kole Knueppel
- TV announcers (BTN): Guy Haberman (play-by-play), Yogi Roth (analyst), and Rhett Lewis (sideline reporter)
- Recap, Game Book

Game information

First Quarter

- (7:41) IU – D'Angelo Ponds 67-yard interception return, Nicolas Radicic kick (Indiana 7–0)

Second Quarter

- (13:24) IU – Omar Cooper Jr. 7-yard pass from Tayven Jackson, Nicolas Radicic kick (Drive: 2 plays, 46 yards, 0:27, Indiana 14–0)
- (7:40) WASH – Giles Jackson 6-yard run, Grady Gross kick (Drive: 6 plays, 75 yards, 2:50, Indiana 14–7)
- (0:00) IU – Nicolas Radicic 19-yard field goal (Drive: 19 plays, 62 yards, 7:30; Indiana 17–7)

Third Quarter

- (12:45) WASH – Demond Williams Jr. 8-yard run, Grady Gross kick (Drive: 4 plays, 24 yards, 2:06, Indiana 17–14)
- (5:03) IU – Justice Ellison 5-yard run, Nicolas Radicic kick (Drive: 14 plays, 75 yards, 7:42, Indiana 24–14)

Fourth Quarter

- (8:55) IU – Tayven Jackson 4-yard run, Nicolas Radicic kick (Drive: 4 plays, 14 yards, 2:18, Indiana 31–14)
- (6:06) WASH – Grady Gross 23-yard field goal (Drive: 8 plays, 65 yards, 2:43; Indiana 31–17)

No. 13/13 Indiana entered as 5.5-point favorites over Washington, last year's national runner-ups. The Hoosiers would make history with Bloomington, Indiana playing host to ESPN College Gameday for the first time. With starting quarterback Kurtis Rourke out after having surgery on his thumb, Tayven Jackson made the start for the Hoosiers. On Washington's second possession, D'Angelo Ponds picked off Will Rogers and returned it 67 yards for a pick-six. The teams exchanged touchdowns in the second quarter before Nicolas Radicic hit a 19-yard field goal with no time remaining to extend IU's lead to 17–7 going into the break. The Hoosiers would score 14 points in the second half while the Huskies could only manage to score 10. With the Hoosiers 31–17 win, Indiana improved to 8–0 matching the best start in program history which was accomplished in 1967.

| Statistics | WASH | IU |
|---|---|---|
| First downs | 16 | 20 |
| Total yards | 318 | 312 |
| Rushes/yards | 31 / 116 | 52 / 188 |
| Passing yards | 202 | 124 |
| Passing: comp–att–int | 19–27–2 | 11–19–1 |
| Time of possession | 28:36 | 31:24 |

| Team | Category | Player | Statistics |
|---|---|---|---|
| Washington | Passing | Will Rogers | 19/26, 202 yards, 2 INT |
| Washington | Rushing | Jonah Coleman | 19 carries, 104 yards |
| Washington | Receiving | Jeremiah Hunter | 4 receptions, 60 yards |
| Indiana | Passing | Tayven Jackson | 11/19, 124 yards, 1 TD, 1 INT |
| Indiana | Rushing | Justice Ellison | 29 carries, 123 yards, 1 TD |
| Indiana | Receiving | Omar Cooper Jr. | 1 reception, 42 yards, 1 TD |

=== at Michigan State ===
No. 13 Indiana Hoosiers (8–0) at Michigan State Spartans (4–4) – Game summary

| Quarter | 1 | 2 | 3 | 4 | Total |
|---|---|---|---|---|---|
| No. 13 Indiana | 0 | 21 | 12 | 14 | 47 |
| Michigan State | 10 | 0 | 0 | 0 | 10 |

at Spartan Stadium • East Lansing, Michigan

- Date: November 2
- Game time: 3:30 p.m. EDT
- Game weather: Sunny • Temperature: 52 °F (11 °C) • Wind: NW at 1 mile per hour (1.6 km/h)
- Game attendance: 68,423
- Referee: Mark Kluczynski
- TV announcers (Peacock): Paul Burmeister (play-by-play), Colt McCoy (analyst), and Zora Stephenson (sideline reporter)
- Recap, Game Book

Game information

First quarter

- (9:58) MSU – Jonathan Kim 47-yard field goal (Drive: 8 plays, 52 yards, 3:36; Michigan State 3–0)
- (2:39) MSU – Nick Marsh 18-yard pass from Aidan Chiles, Jonathan Kim kick (Drive: 13 plays, 71 yards, 6:18; Michigan State 10–0)

Second quarter

- (14:13) IU – Zach Horton 17-yard pass from Kurtis Rourke, Nicolas Radicic kick (Drive: 7 plays, 75 yards, 3:26; Michigan State 10–7)
- (6:22) IU – Ty Son Lawton 1-yard run, Nicolas Radicic kick (Drive: 4 plays, 64 yards, 2:13; Indiana 14–10)
- (2:10) IU – Elijah Sarratt 4-yard pass from Kurtis Rourke, Nicolas Radicic kick (Drive: 6 plays, 37 yards, 2:45; Indiana 21–10)

Third quarter

- (13:28) IU – Ryan Eckley punt blocked by D'Angelo Ponds out of bounds in end zone for a safety (Indiana 23–10)
- (11:39) IU – Myles Price 18-yard pass from Kurtis Rourke, Nicolas Radicic kick (Drive: 6 plays, 65 yards, 1:43; Indiana 30–10)
- (2:43) IU – Nicolas Radicic 29-yard field goal (Drive: 9 plays, 44 yards, 4:56; Indiana 33–10)

Fourth quarter

- (14:05) IU – Omar Cooper Jr. 16-yard run, Nicolas Radicic kick (Drive: 2 plays, 21 yards, 0:49; Indiana 40–10)
- (10:52) IU – Elijah Sarratt 11-yard pass from Kurtis Rourke, Nicolas Radicic kick (Drive: 5 plays, 37 yards, 1:37; Indiana 47–10)

No. 13/13 Indiana came into the Battle for the Old Brass Spittoon as 7.5-point favorites over Michigan State. Starting quarterback Kurtis Rourke returned from injury after having surgery on his throwing thumb. Spartans kicker Jonathan Kim opened up the scoring, hitting a 47-yard field goal. This marked the first time all season that the Hoosiers have trailed. Aidan Chiles would connect with Nick Marsh on the issuing possession for an 18-yard touchdown to put the Spartans ahead 10–0 going into the second quarter. Indiana would not let them score the rest of the game. After scoring three straight touchdowns in the second to put them ahead 21–10 going into halftime, the Hoosiers added to the total, scoring 47 unanswered points to beat the Spartans 47–10. The Hoosiers improved their undefeated start, moving to a program record 9–0 (6–0). Their 6–0 conference record matched the 1967, 1987, and 2020 seasons for most conference wins in program history. This also marked the first time Indiana had won nine straight games. The Hoosiers held Michigan State to –36 rushing yards which set a program record for lowest rushing total allowed. This was also the seventh time Indiana scored 40+ points in a game this season, which set another program record.

| Statistics | IU | MSU |
|---|---|---|
| First downs | 20 | 15 |
| Total yards | 385 | 193 |
| Rushes/yards | 32 / 122 | 32 / –36 |
| Passing yards | 263 | 229 |
| Passing: comp–att–int | 19–29–0 | 20–32–2 |
| Time of possession | 29:34 | 30:26 |

| Team | Category | Player | Statistics |
|---|---|---|---|
| Indiana | Passing | Kurtis Rourke | 19/29, 263 yards, 4 TD |
| Indiana | Rushing | Justice Ellison | 9 carries, 32 yards |
| Indiana | Receiving | Ke'Shawn Williams | 6 receptions, 86 yards |
| Michigan State | Passing | Aidan Chiles | 16/24, 193 yards, 1 TD, 2 INT |
| Michigan State | Rushing | Alante Brown | 2 carries, 16 yards |
| Michigan State | Receiving | Nick Marsh | 5 receptions, 78 yards, 1 TD |

=== vs Michigan ===
Michigan Wolverines (5–4) vs No. 8 Indiana Hoosiers (9–0) – Game summary

| Quarter | 1 | 2 | 3 | 4 | Total |
|---|---|---|---|---|---|
| Michigan | 3 | 0 | 6 | 6 | 15 |
| No. 8 Indiana | 7 | 10 | 0 | 3 | 20 |

at Memorial Stadium • Bloomington, Indiana

- Date: November 9
- Game time: 3:30 p.m. EST
- Game weather: Sunny • Temperature: 61 °F (16 °C) • Wind: E at 6 miles per hour (9.7 km/h)
- Game attendance: 53,082
- Referee: Bryan Banks
- TV announcers (CBS): Brad Nessler (play-by-play), Gary Danielson (analyst), and Jenny Dell (sideline reporter)
- Recap, Game Book

Game information

First quarter

- MICH – Dominic Zvada 39-yard field goal (Drive: 14 plays, 66 yards, 7:29; Michigan 3–0)
- IU – Omar Cooper Jr. 7-yard pass from Kurtis Rourke, Nicolas Radicic kick (Drive: 7 plays, 75 yards, 3:44; Indiana 7–3)

Second quarter

- IU – Elijah Sarratt 36-yard pass from Kurtis Rourke, Nicolas Radicic kick (Drive: 7 plays, 65 yards, 3:08; Indiana 14–3)
- IU – Nicholas Radicic 40-yard field goal (Drive: 5 plays, 27 yards, 3:23; Indiana 17–3)

Third quarter

- MICH – Dominic Zvada 22-yard field goal (Drive: 4 plays, 4 yards, 2:18; Indiana 17–6)
- MICH – Dominic Zvada 56-yard field goal (Drive: 12 plays, 44 yards, 7:02; Indiana 17–9)

Fourth quarter

- MICH – Kalel Mullings 1–yard run, two-point pass failed (Drive: 7 plays, 34 yards, 3:52; Indiana 17–15)
- IU – Nicolas Radicic 41-yard field goal (Drive: 6 plays, 16 yards, 2:45; Indiana 20–15)

No. 8/8/10 Indiana came into the game as 14.5-point favorites against Michigan, last year's national champions. Michigan's Dominic Zvada started the game with a field goal before Indiana scored a touchdown of their own to make the score 7–3 going into the second quarter. Indiana would score another touchdown and add a Nicolas Radicic field goal to go up 17–3 heading into halftime. Zvada would add two more field goals to cut the lead to 17–9 entering the fourth quarter. With a chance to tie it up, Kalel Mullings ran for a 1-yard touchdown to pull Michigan within two with 9:35 left in regulation. The Wolverines would go for two but the pass would fall incomplete. The teams would exchange punts on the next two drives, but with 2:34 left in the game, Radicic hit a 41-yard field goal to put the Hoosiers ahead by five. Michigan regained possession with 2:29 left on their 21-yard line. Davis Warren would pick up one first down on a 7-yard pass to Tyler Morris to get it to the 33-yard line before the two-minute timeout. Warren would come out of the timeout throwing three straight incompletions, setting up for a do-or-die fourth down play. Warren would complete a pass to his tight end Peyton O'Leary at the 37-yard line. O'Leary would dive for the first down at the 40-yard line, needing to make it to the 43, but would come up a yard short, turning the ball over on downs with 1:35 left in the game. After Ty Son Lawton ran for eight yards to start the drive, Michigan used their first timeout of the half hoping for a stop. On the next play, Kurtis Rourke faked the handoff and ran for a 4-yard gain to give Indiana the first down they needed to seal the game. With their 20–15 win over Michigan, Indiana increased their program-best start to 10–0 (7–0), becoming the last Big Ten team to have a 10-win season. They also set a new program record by improving to 7–0 in conference play.

| Statistics | MICH | IU |
|---|---|---|
| First downs | 16 | 14 |
| Total yards | 206 | 246 |
| Rushes/yards | 34 / 69 | 28 / 40 |
| Passing yards | 137 | 206 |
| Passing: comp–att–int | 16–32–0 | 17–28–1 |
| Time of possession | 33:08 | 26:52 |

| Team | Category | Player | Statistics |
|---|---|---|---|
| Michigan | Passing | Davis Warren | 16/32, 137 yards |
| Michigan | Rushing | Donovan Edwards | 15 carries, 46 yards |
| Michigan | Receiving | Colston Loveland | 4 receptions, 37 yards |
| Indiana | Passing | Kurtis Rourke | 17/28, 206 yards, 2 TD, 1 INT |
| Indiana | Rushing | Ty Son Lawton | 12 carries, 55 yards |
| Indiana | Receiving | Ke'Shawn Williams | 6 receptions, 70 yards |

=== at No. 2 Ohio State ===
No. 5 Indiana Hoosiers (10–0) at No. 2 Ohio State Buckeyes (9–1) – Game summary

| Quarter | 1 | 2 | 3 | 4 | Total |
|---|---|---|---|---|---|
| No. 5 Indiana | 7 | 0 | 0 | 8 | 15 |
| No. 2 Ohio State | 0 | 14 | 14 | 10 | 38 |

at Ohio Stadium • Columbus, Ohio

- Date: November 23
- Game time: 12:00 p.m. EST
- Game weather: Cloudy • Temperature: 46 °F (8 °C) • Wind: NW at 12 miles per hour (19 km/h)
- Game attendance: 105,751
- Referee: Jerry McGinn
- TV announcers (FOX): Gus Johnson (play-by-play), Joel Klatt (analyst), and Jenny Taft (sideline reporter)
- Recap, Game Book

Game information

First quarter

- (6:52) IU – Ty Son Lawton 2-yard run, Nicolas Radicic kick (Drive: 11 plays, 70 yards, 6:12; Indiana 7–0)

Second quarter

- (7:22) OSU – Emeka Egbuka 11-yard pass from Will Howard, Jayden Fielding kick (Drive: 5 plays, 44 yards, 2:20; Tied 7–7)
- (0:21) OSU – TreVeyon Henderson 4-yard run, Jayden Fielding kick (Drive: 3 plays, 7 yards, 1:20; Ohio State 14–7)

Third quarter

- (12:44) OSU – Caleb Downs 79-yard punt return, Jayden Fielding kick (Ohio State 21–7)
- (6:02) OSU – Jelani Thurman 1-yard pass from Will Howard, Jayden Fielding kick (Drive: 10 plays, 75 yards, 5:45; Ohio State 28–7)

Fourth quarter

- (8:56) OSU – Jayden Fielding 45-yard field goal (Drive: 11 plays, 43 yards, 5:51; Ohio State 31–7)
- (1:53) IU – Ty Son Lawton 2-yard run, Omar Cooper Jr. pass from Kurtis Rourke (Drive: 15 plays, 75 yards, 7:03; Ohio State 31–15)
- (0:35) OSU – Will Howard 1-yard run, Jayden Fielding kick (Drive: 3 plays, 40 yards, 1:18; Ohio State 38–15)

| Statistics | IU | OSU |
|---|---|---|
| First downs | 16 | 14 |
| Total yards | 151 | 316 |
| Rushes/yards | 40 / 86 | 29 / 115 |
| Passing yards | 68 | 201 |
| Passing: comp–att–int | 8–18–0 | 22–26–1 |
| Time of possession | 30:40 | 29:20 |

| Team | Category | Player | Statistics |
|---|---|---|---|
| Indiana | Passing | Kurtis Rourke | 8/18, 68 yards |
| Indiana | Rushing | Ty Son Lawton | 15 carries, 79 yards, 2 TD |
| Indiana | Receiving | Elijah Sarratt | 3 receptions, 40 yards |
| Ohio State | Passing | Will Howard | 22/26, 201 yards, 2 TD, 1 INT |
| Ohio State | Rushing | TreVeyon Henderson | 9 carries, 68 yards, 1 TD |
| Ohio State | Receiving | Emeka Egbuka | 7 receptions, 80 yards, 1 TD |

=== vs Purdue ===
Purdue Boilermakers (1–10) vs No. 10 Indiana Hoosiers (10–1) – Game summary

| Quarter | 1 | 2 | 3 | 4 | Total |
|---|---|---|---|---|---|
| Purdue | 0 | 0 | 0 | 0 | 0 |
| No. 10 Indiana | 7 | 21 | 17 | 21 | 66 |

at Memorial Stadium • Bloomington, Indiana

- Date: November 30
- Game time: 7:00 p.m. EST
- Game weather: Snowy • Temperature: 28 °F (−2 °C) • Wind: SW at 9 miles per hour (14 km/h)
- Game attendance: 53,082
- Referee: Jeffrey Servinski
- TV announcers (FS1): Tim Brando (play-by-play), Devin Gardner (analyst), and Josh Sims (sideline reporter)
- Recap, Game Book

Game information

First quarter

- (6:25) IU – Justice Ellison 2-yard run, Nicolas Radicic kick (Drive: 9 plays, 86 yards, 3:52; Indiana 7–0)

Second quarter

- (11:31) IU – Ke'Shawn Williams 14-yard pass from Kurtis Rourke, Nicolas Radicic kick (Drive: 9 plays, 71 yards, 4:13; Indiana 14–0)
- (6:59) IU – Elijah Sarratt 84-yard pass from Kurtis Rourke, Nicolas Radicic kick (Drive: 4 plays, 99 yards, 2:01; Indiana 21–0)
- (2:52) IU – Ty Son Lawton 4-yard run, Nicolas Radicic kick (Drive: 7 plays, 70 yards, 3:15; Indiana 28–0)

Third quarter

- (12:12) IU – Nicolas Radicic 26-yard field goal (Drive: 7 plays, 11 yards, 2:37; Indiana 31–0)
- (7:51) IU – Elijah Sarratt 24-yard pass from Kurtis Rourke, Nicolas Radicic kick (Drive: 4 plays, 42 yards, 1:57; Indiana 38–0)
- (1:31) IU – Zach Horton 5-yard pass from Kurtis Rourke, Nicolas Radicic kick (Drive: 8 plays, 48 yards, 4:03; Indiana 45–0)

Fourth quarter

- (12:47) IU – Miles Cross 34-yard pass from Kurtis Rourke, Nicolas Radicic kick (Drive: 7 plays, 76 yards, 2:27; Indiana 52–0)
- (12:01) IU – Omar Cooper Jr. 17-yard pass from Kurtis Rourke, Nicolas Radicic kick (Drive: 1 plays, 17 yards, 0:05; Indiana 59–0)
- (1:48) IU – Tayven Jackson 4-yard run, Nicolas Radicic kick (Drive: 4 plays, 35 yards, 1:33; Indiana 66–0)

| Statistics | PUR | IU |
|---|---|---|
| First downs | 5 | 30 |
| Total yards | 67 | 582 |
| Rushes/yards | 13 / 24 | 44 / 233 |
| Passing yards | 54 | 349 |
| Passing: comp–att–int | 9–21–2 | 23–31–0 |
| Time of possession | 23:23 | 36:37 |

| Team | Category | Player | Statistics |
|---|---|---|---|
| Purdue | Passing | Hudson Card | 6/13, 35 yards, 1 INT |
| Purdue | Rushing | Devin Mockobee | 14 carries, 21 yards |
| Purdue | Receiving | Max Klare | 5 receptions, 36 yards |
| Indiana | Passing | Kurtis Rourke | 23/31, 349 yards, 6 TD |
| Indiana | Rushing | Justice Ellison | 11 carries, 63 yards, 1 TD |
| Indiana | Receiving | Elijah Sarratt | 8 receptions, 165 yards, 2 TD |

=== at No. 5 Notre Dame (CFP First Round) ===
College Football Playoff First Round: No. 8 Indiana Hoosiers (11–1) at No. 5 Notre Dame Fighting Irish (11–1) – Game summary

| Quarter | 1 | 2 | 3 | 4 | Total |
|---|---|---|---|---|---|
| No. 8 Hoosiers | 0 | 3 | 0 | 14 | 17 |
| No. 5 Fighting Irish | 7 | 10 | 3 | 7 | 27 |

at Notre Dame Stadium • Notre Dame, Indiana

- Date: December 20
- Game time: 8:00 p.m. EST
- Game weather: Cloudy
- Game attendance: 77,622
- Referee: David Alvarez
- TV announcers (ESPN/ABC): Sean McDonough (play-by-play), Greg McElroy (analyst), Molly McGrath and Katie George (sideline)

Game information

First quarter

- (10:57) ND – Jeremiyah Love 98-yard run, Mitch Jeter kick (Drive: 1 play, 98 yards, 0:14; Notre Dame 7–0)

Second quarter

- (12:52) ND – Jayden Thomas 5-yard pass from Riley Leonard, Mitch Jeter kick (Drive: 16 plays, 83 yards, 9:08; Notre Dame 14–0)
- (3:26) IU – Nicolas Radicic 34-yard field goal (Drive: 9 plays, 48 yards, 4:00; Notre Dame 14–3)
- (0:07) ND – Mitch Jeter 49-yard field goal (Drive: 12 plays, 52 yards, 3:19; Notre Dame 17–3)

Third quarter

- (4:21) ND – Mitch Jeter 33-yard field goal (Drive: 11 plays, 28 yards, 6:43; Notre Dame 20–3)

Fourth quarter

- (4:50) ND – Riley Leonard 1-yard run, Mitch Jeter kick (Drive: 9 plays, 78 yards, 5:44; Notre Dame 27–3)
- (1:27) IU – Myles Price 7-yard pass from Kurtis Rourke, Kurtis Rourke pass to Elijah Sarratt for Two-Point Conversion (Drive: 12 plays, 76 yards, 3:23; Notre Dame 27–11)
- (0:25) IU – Omar Cooper Jr. 23-yard pass from Kurtis Rourke, Two-Point Conversion failed (Drive: 8 plays, 50 yards, 1:02; Notre Dame 27–17)

| Statistics | IU | ND |
|---|---|---|
| First downs | 17 | 20 |
| Total yards | 278 | 394 |
| Rushes/yards | 27-63 | 35-193 |
| Passing yards | 215 | 201 |
| Passing: comp–att–int | 20-34-1 | 23-32-1 |
| Time of possession | 24:17 | 35:43 |

| Team | Category | Player | Statistics |
|---|---|---|---|
| Indiana | Passing | Kurtis Rourke | 20/34, 215 yds, 2 TD, INT |
| Indiana | Rushing | Justice Ellison | 11 carries, 37 yds |
| Indiana | Receiving | Elijah Sarratt | 4 receptions, 67 yards |
| Notre Dame | Passing | Riley Leonard | 23/32, 201 yds, TD, INT |
| Notre Dame | Rushing | Jeremiyah Love | 8 Carries, 108 yds, TD |
| Notre Dame | Receiving | Jordan Faison | 7 receptions, 89 yds |

== Personnel ==
=== Roster ===
2024 Indiana Hoosiers football team roster
Players
Coaches
Offense

| Pos. | # | Name | Class |
|---|---|---|---|
| WR | 0 | Andison Coby | Sr |
| QB | 2 | Tayven Jackson | RSo |
| WR | 3 | Omar Cooper Jr. | RSo |
| WR | 4 | Myles Price | Sr |
| WR | 5 | Ke'Shawn Williams | Sr |
| RB | 6 | Justice Ellison (C) | Sr |
| WR | 7 | E.J. Williams Jr. | Sr |
| RB | 8 | Kaelon Black | RJr |
| QB | 9 | Kurtis Rourke | RSr |
| QB | 12 | Roman Purcell | RJr |
| WR | 13 | Elijah Sarratt | Jr |
| WR | 14 | Derin McCulley | RSr |
| QB | 15 | Tyler Cherry | Fr |
| QB | 16 | Alberto Mendoza | Fr |
| RB | 17 | Ty Son Lawton | RSr |
| RB | 18 | Solomon Vanhorse | GS |
| WR | 19 | Miles Cross | Sr |
| RB | 21 | Elijah Green | RJr |
| WR | 24 | Jackson Wasserstrom | RSo |
| RB | 25 | Daniel Weems | RSo |
| RB | 28 | Khobie Martin | Fr |
| RB | 30 | Kyler Kropp | Fr |
| TE | 44 | Zach Horton | Sr |
| TE | 45 | Trey Walker | RSr |
| TE | 48 | James Bomba | RJr |
| OL | 53 | Vincent Fiacable (injured) | RJr |
| OL | 54 | Jack Greer | RSo |
| OL | 55 | Nick Kidwell (injured) | RSr |
| OL | 56 | Mike Katic (C) | RSr |
| OL | 62 | Drew Evans (injured) | RSo |
| OL | 63 | Mitch Verstegen | Fr |
| OL | 65 | Carter Smith | RSo |
| OL | 70 | Austin Leibfried | Fr |
| OL | 71 | Evan Lawrence | Fr |
| OL | 72 | Adedamola Ajani | Fr |
| OL | 73 | Austin Barrett | RFr |
| OL | 74 | Bray Lynch | RSo |
| OL | 75 | Trey Wedig | RSr |
| OL | 77 | Tyler Stephens | Sr |
| OL | 78 | Cooper Jones | RJr |
| OL | 79 | Max Williams | RSo |
| WR | 80 | Charlie Becker | Fr |
| WR | 81 | Brady Simmons | RSo |
| TE | 82 | Brody Kosin | Fr |
| WR | 83 | Eli Jochem | RJr |
| TE | 86 | Brody Foley | RSo |
| TE | 88 | Sam West | RFr |
| WR | 89 | Camden Jordan | RJr |

Defense

| Pos. | # | Name | Class |
|---|---|---|---|
| DB | 0 | Josh Philostin (injured) | Fr |
| DB | 1 | Shawn Asbury II | Sr |
| LB | 2 | Jailin Walker | Sr |
| DB | 3 | JoJo Johnson | RJr |
| LB | 4 | Aiden Fisher | Jr |
| DB | 5 | D'Angelo Ponds | So |
| DL | 6 | Mikail Kamara | RJr |
| DL | 7 | Jacob Mangum-Farrar | GS |
| DL | 8 | CJ West | RSr |
| DB | 9 | Jamier Johnson | RJr |
| DB | 12 | Terry Jones Jr. | RSr |
| DB | 13 | Cedarius Doss | RSr |
| LB | 14 | Kaiden Turner | RSo |
| DB | 15 | Nic Toomer | RSr |
| DB | 16 | Jah Jah Boyd | Fr |
| DL | 18 | Andrew Turvy | RJr |
| DB | 19 | Josh Sanguinetti | RSr |
| DB | 20 | Dontrae Henderson | Fr |
| LB | 21 | Rolijah Hardy | Fr |
| DB | 22 | Jamari Sharpe | RSo |
| DB | 24 | Bryson Bonds | RJr |
| DB | 25 | Amare Ferrell | So |
| DB | 27 | Reece Bellin | RFr |
| DB | 28 | Jaz Boykin | RFr |
| DB | 29 | Luke Haupert | RFr |
| DB | 31 | Anthony Chung | RFr |
| LB | 34 | Jeff Utzinger | RSo |
| DB | 36 | Clay Conner | RFr |
| DB | 37 | Heath Kizer | Fr |
| LB | 38 | Kaden McConnell | Fr |
| LB | 39 | Carter Imes | Fr |
| LB | 40 | Quentin Clark | Fr |
| DL | 41 | Lanell Carr Jr. | Sr |
| DL | 42 | Andrew Depaepe (injured) | RFr |
| DB | 45 | Lincoln Murff | RFr |
| LB | 46 | Isaiah Jones | RSo |
| DL | 47 | Finn Walters | RFr |
| DL | 49 | Ta'Derius Collins | RFr |
| LB | 52 | Clayton Allen | RFr |
| DL | 54 | Caleb King | Fr |
| DL | 55 | Venson Sneed Jr. | RSo |
| DL | 58 | Aden Cannon | RSo |
| DL | 64 | Race Stewart | RJr |
| DL | 90 | J'mari Monette | RSo |
| DL | 91 | Daniel Ndukwe | Fr |
| DL | 92 | Marcus Burris Jr. | RJr |
| DL | 93 | Robby Harrison | RSo |
| DL | 95 | Tyrique Tucker | RSo |
| DL | 97 | Mario Landino | Fr |
| DL | 98 | William Depaepe | Fr |
| DL | 99 | James Carpenter (C) | RSr |

Special teams

| Pos. | # | Name | Class |
|---|---|---|---|
| K | 39 | Nico Radicic | RFr |
| K | 43 | Derek McCormick | RSr |
| LS | 47 | Mark Langston | RSr |
| K | 90 | Josh Placzek | Fr |
| K | 93 | Quinn Warren | Fr |
| P | 94 | James Evans | Sr |
| P | 96 | Alejandro Quintero | RJr |
| LS | 97 | Jaxon Miller | RSo |

Head coach

- Curt Cignetti

Coordinators/assistant coaches

- Mike Shanahan (Offensive coordinator/wide receivers)
- Tino Sunseri (Co-offensive coordinator/quarterbacks)
- Bryant Haines (Defensive coordinator/linebackers)
- Grant Cain (Special teams coordinator/tight ends)
- Bob Bostad (Run game coordinator/offensive line)
- John Miller (Running backs)
- Pat Kuntz (Defensive tackles)
- Buddha Williams (Defensive ends)
- Rod Ojong (Cornerbacks)
- Ola Adams (Safeties/defensive backs)

Legend

- (C) Team captain
- (S) Suspended
- (I) Ineligible
- Injured
- Redshirt

Roster
Last update: August 27, 2024

Roster movement

- On September 27, Nahji Logan, Joshua Rudolph, Tyrik McDaniel, Ebon Person, Neil Campbell, and Aaron Stewart left the program.
- On October 1, Donaven McCulley left the program.
- On October 3, DJ Warnell Jr. left the program.
- On October 22, E.J. Williams Jr. left the program, but returned two months later.

=== Coaching staff ===
| Name | Position | Consecutive season at Indiana in current position |
|---|---|---|
| Curt Cignetti | Head coach | 1st |
| Mike Shanahan | Offensive coordinator/wide receivers coach | 1st |
| Tino Sunseri | Co-offensive coordinator/quarterbacks coach | 1st |
| Bryant Haines | Defensive coordinator/linebackers coach | 1st |
| Grant Cain | Special teams coordinator/tight ends coach | 1st |
| Bob Bostad | Run game coordinator/offensive line coach | 2nd |
| Ola Adams | Safeties coach/defensive backs coach | 1st |
| Pat Kuntz | Defensive tackles coach | 1st |
| John Miller | Running backs coach | 1st |
| Rod Ojong | Cornerbacks coach | 1st |
| Buddha Williams | Defensive ends coach | 1st |
| Derek Owings | Director of athletic performance | 1st |

== Statistics ==
=== Team ===
| | Indiana | Opp |
|---|---|---|
| Points per game | 43.3 | 14.7 |
| Total | 520 | 176 |
| First downs | 289 | 172 |
| Rushing | 124 | 60 |
| Passing | 145 | 93 |
| Penalty | 20 | 19 |
| Rushing yards | 2,083 | 850 |
| Avg per play | 4.5 | 2.5 |
| Avg per game | 3.6 | 70.7 |
| Rushing touchdowns | 37 | 10 |
| Passing yards | 3,182 | 2,088 |
| Att-Comp-Int | 327-226-5 | 365-225-14 |
| Avg per pass | 9.7 | 5.7 |
| Avg per game | 265.2 | 174.0 |
| Passing touchdowns | 31 | 10 |
| Total offense | 5,265 | 2,938 |
| Avg per play | 6.7 | 4.1 |
| Avg per game | 438.8 | 244.8 |
| Fumbles-Lost | 9-3 | 15-9 |
| Penalties-Yards | 57-525 | 70-549 |
| Avg per game | 43.8 | 45.8 |
| Punts-Yards | 30-1,326 | 60-2,633 |
| Avg per punt | 40.5 | 37.8 |
| Time of possession/Game | 31:14 | 28:46 |
| 3rd down conversions | 64-132 (48.5%) | 48-155 (31%) |
| 4th down conversions | 12-21 (57.1%) | 10-32 (31.3%) |
| Touchdowns scored | 70 | 21 |
| Field goals-Attempts | 9-10 | 10-11 |
| PAT-Attempts | 69-69 | 20-20 |
| Attendance | 386,992 | |
| Games/Avg per Game | 48,374 | |
| Neutral Site | - | |

=== Individual Leaders ===
==== Offense ====
Passing statistics
| # | NAME | POS | CMP | ATT | PCT | YDS | AVG | TD | INT | RTG |
|---|---|---|---|---|---|---|---|---|---|---|
| 9 | Kurtis Rourke | QB | 202 | 287 | 70.4 | 2,827 | 257 | 27 | 4 | 181.4 |
| 2 | Tayven Jackson | QB | 23 | 37 | 62.2 | 349 | 49.9 | 4 | 1 | 171.7 |
| 16 | Alberto Mendoza | QB | 1 | 1 | 100.0 | 6 | 6.0 | 0 | 0 | 150.4 |
| 6 | Justice Ellison | RB | 0 | 1 | 0.0 | 0 | 0.0 | 0 | 0 | 0.0 |
| 17 | Ty Son Lawton | RB | 0 | 1 | 0.0 | 0 | 0.0 | 0 | 0 | 0.0 |
| | TOTALS | | 226 | 327 | 69.1 | 3,182 | 265.2 | 31 | 5 | 179.1 |
| | OPPONENTS | | 225 | 365 | 61.6 | 2,088 | 174 | 10 | 14 | 111.1 |

Rushing statistics
| # | NAME | POS | ATT | YDS | AVG | LNG | TD |
|---|---|---|---|---|---|---|---|
| 6 | Justice Ellison | RB | 120 | 686 | 5.7 | 47 | 9 |
| 17 | Ty Son Lawton | RB | 106 | 508 | 4.8 | 29 | 8 |
| 8 | Kaelon Black | RB | 39 | 217 | 5.6 | 21 | 2 |
| 21 | Elijah Green | RB | 26 | 186 | 7.2 | 51 | 5 |
| 28 | Khobie Martin | RB | 14 | 73 | 5.2 | 31 | 0 |
| 2 | Tayven Jackson | QB | 12 | 53 | 4.4 | 13 | 2 |
| 4 | Myles Price | WR | 5 | 39 | 7.8 | 25 | 1 |
| 3 | Omar Cooper Jr. | WR | 2 | 23 | 11.5 | 16 | 1 |
| 25 | Daniel Weems | RB | 4 | 19 | 4.8 | 6 | 0 |
| 9 | Kurtis Rourke | QB | 30 | 17 | 0.6 | 12 | 2 |
| 80 | Charlie Becker | WR | 1 | 3 | 3.0 | 3 | 1 |
| 16 | Alberto Mendoza | QB | 2 | –3 | –1.5 | 2 | 0 |
| | TOTALS | | 379 | 1,767 | 4.7 | 51 | 32 |
| | OPPONENTS | | 293 | 722 | 2.5 | 75 | 8 |

Receiving statistics
| # | NAME | POS | REC | YDS | AVG | LNG | TD |
|---|---|---|---|---|---|---|---|
| 13 | Elijah Sarratt | WR | 38 | 685 | 18.0 | 71 | 6 |
| 3 | Omar Cooper Jr. | WR | 24 | 527 | 22.0 | 69 | 5 |
| 4 | Myles Price | WR | 30 | 377 | 12.6 | 41 | 2 |
| 5 | Ke'Shawn Williams | WR | 27 | 341 | 12.6 | 52 | 4 |
| 19 | Miles Cross | WR | 25 | 289 | 11.6 | 33 | 3 |
| 44 | Zach Horton | TE | 17 | 156 | 9.2 | 18 | 3 |
| 17 | Ty Son Lawton | RB | 8 | 101 | 12.6 | 35 | 0 |
| 6 | Justice Ellison | RB | 11 | 84 | 7.6 | 19 | 0 |
| 0 | Andison Coby | WR | 3 | 70 | 23.3 | 38 | 1 |
| 7 | E.J. Williams Jr. | WR | 2 | 49 | 24.5 | 37 | 0 |
| 88 | Sam West | TE | 1 | 37 | 37.0 | 37 | 0 |
| 1 | Donaven McCulley | WR | 2 | 21 | 10.5 | 12 | 1 |
| 18 | Solomon Vanhorse | RB | 1 | 14 | 14.0 | 14 | 0 |
| 8 | Kaelon Black | RB | 4 | 6 | 1.5 | 8 | 0 |
| 81 | Brady Simmons | WR | 1 | 6 | 6.0 | 6 | 0 |
| 48 | James Bomba | TE | 1 | 2 | 2.0 | 2 | 0 |
| | TOTALS | | 195 | 2,765 | 14.2 | 71 | 25 |
| | OPPONENTS | | 194 | 1,833 | 9.5 | 47 | 8 |

==== Defense ====
Defense statistics
| # | NAME | POS | SOLO | AST | TOT | TFL-YDS | SACK-YDS | INT | BU | QBH | FR | FF |
|---|---|---|---|---|---|---|---|---|---|---|---|---|
| 4 | Aiden Fisher | LB | 37 | 61 | 98 | 3.5–10 | 1.5–1 | 0 | 3 | 3 | 0 | 0 |
| 2 | Jailin Walker | LB | 28 | 31 | 59 | 4–9 | 0.5–4 | 0 | 6 | 2 | 0 | 1 |
| 1 | Shawn Asbury II | DB | 21 | 33 | 54 | 3.5–22 | 1.5–12 | 1 | 3 | 1 | 0 | 0 |
| 5 | D'Angelo Ponds | DB | 29 | 16 | 45 | 3.5–6 | 0–0 | 2 | 6 | 0 | 0 | 0 |
| 6 | Mikail Kamara | DL | 18 | 21 | 39 | 14.5–84 | 9.5–73 | 0 | 1 | 4 | 3 | 2 |
| 25 | Amare Ferrell | DB | 16 | 21 | 37 | 2–11 | 1–9 | 2 | 1 | 1 | 0 | 0 |
| 46 | Isaiah Jones | LB | 12 | 25 | 37 | 2.5–6 | 0.5–3 | 0 | 0 | 1 | 0 | 0 |
| 9 | Jamier Johnson | DB | 24 | 9 | 33 | 0–0 | 0–0 | 1 | 0 | 0 | 0 | 0 |
| 8 | CJ West | LB | 11 | 21 | 32 | 5-17 | 2-12 | 0 | 1 | 0 | 0 | 1 |
| 41 | Lanell Carr Jr. | DL | 9 | 19 | 28 | 3.5–11 | 1.5–9 | 0 | 1 | 3 | 0 | 0 |
| 12 | Terry Jones Jr. | DB | 15 | 12 | 27 | 5–11 | 1–2 | 0 | 2 | 1 | 0 | 1 |
| 99 | James Carpenter | DL | 12 | 13 | 25 | 8–36 | 4–31 | 0 | 1 | 3 | 0 | 0 |
| 19 | Josh Sanguinetti | DB | 10 | 24 | 23 | 1–2 | 0–0 | 0 | 0 | 0 | 0 | 0 |
| 95 | Tyrique Tucker | DL | 9 | 13 | 22 | 4.5–20 | 2.5–16 | 0 | 1 | 4 | 0 | 0 |
| 24 | Bryson Bonds | DB | 6 | 10 | 16 | 0–0 | 0–0 | 0 | 0 | 0 | 1 | 0 |
| 21 | Rolijah Hardy | LB | 9 | 4 | 13 | 4-27 | 1-14 | 2 | 0 | 0 | 0 | 1 |
| 92 | Marcus Burris Jr. | DL | 2 | 10 | 12 | 2–11 | 1–9 | 0 | 0 | 0 | 0 | 0 |
| 13 | Cedarius Doss | DB | 5 | 4 | 9 | 0–0 | 0–0 | 0 | 1 | 0 | 0 | 0 |
| 22 | Jamari Sharpe | DB | 3 | 6 | 9 | 0–0 | 0–0 | 0 | 6 | 0 | 0 | 0 |
| 7 | Jacob Mangum-Farrar | DL | 4 | 3 | 7 | 1–18 | 1–18 | 1 | 0 | 0 | 1 | 1 |
| 97 | Mario Landino | DL | 2 | 3 | 5 | 2–8 | 0.5–4 | 0 | 0 | 0 | 0 | 1 |
| 34 | Jeff Utzinger | LB | 1 | 4 | 5 | 0–0 | 0–0 | 0 | 0 | 0 | 0 | 0 |
| 18 | Andrew Turvy | DL | 3 | 1 | 4 | 1.5–9 | 1–8 | 0 | 0 | 0 | 0 | 0 |
| 10 | DJ Warnell Jr. | DB | 3 | 1 | 4 | 1–4 | 1–4 | 0 | 1 | 0 | 0 | 0 |
| 55 | Venson Sneed Jr. | DL | 0 | 3 | 3 | 0–0 | 0–0 | 0 | 0 | 0 | 0 | 0 |
| 8 | Kaelon Black | RB | 0 | 2 | 2 | 0–0 | 0–0 | 0 | 0 | 0 | 0 | 0 |
| 13 | Elijah Sarratt | WR | 2 | 0 | 2 | 0–0 | 0–0 | 0 | 0 | 0 | 0 | 0 |
| 14 | Kaiden Turner | LB | 1 | 1 | 2 | 0–0 | 0–0 | 0 | 0 | 0 | 0 | 0 |
| 18 | Solomon Vanhorse | WR | 2 | 0 | 2 | 0–0 | 0–0 | 0 | 0 | 0 | 0 | 0 |
| 0 | Andison Coby | WR | 1 | 0 | 1 | 0–0 | 0–0 | 0 | 0 | 0 | 0 | 0 |
| 21 | Elijah Green | RB | 0 | 1 | 1 | 0–0 | 0–0 | 0 | 0 | 0 | 0 | 0 |
| 56 | Mike Katic | OL | 0 | 1 | 1 | 0–0 | 0–0 | 0 | 0 | 0 | 0 | 0 |
| 74 | Bray McCormick | K | 0 | 1 | 1 | 0–0 | 0–0 | 0 | 0 | 0 | 0 | 0 |
| 17 | Derek McDaniel | DB | 1 | 0 | 1 | 0–0 | 0–0 | 0 | 0 | 0 | 0 | 0 |
| 17 | Tyrik McDaniel | DB | 1 | 0 | 1 | 0–0 | 0–0 | 0 | 0 | 0 | 0 | 0 |
| 90 | J'mari Monnette | DL | 1 | 0 | 1 | 1–3 | 0–0 | 0 | 0 | 0 | 0 | 0 |
| 91 | Daniel Ndukwe | DL | 0 | 1 | 1 | 0–0 | 0–0 | 0 | 0 | 0 | 0 | 0 |
| 9 | Kurtis Rourke | QB | 0 | 1 | 1 | 0–0 | 0–0 | 0 | 0 | 0 | 0 | 0 |
| 93 | Quinn Warren | K | 1 | 0 | 1 | 0–0 | 0–0 | 0 | 0 | 0 | 0 | 0 |
| 5 | Ke'Shawn Williams | WR | 1 | 0 | 1 | 0–0 | 0–0 | 0 | 0 | 0 | 0 | 0 |
| 93 | Robby Harrison | DL | 0 | 0 | 0 | 0–0 | 0–0 | 0 | 0 | 0 | 1 | 0 |
| 49 | Ta'Derius Collins | DL | 0 | 0 | 0 | 0–0 | 0–0 | 1 | 0 | 0 | 0 | 0 |
| | TOTAL | | 300 | 366 | 666 | 73–325 | 31–233 | 11 | 34 | 23 | 6 | 9 |

Key: POS: Position, SOLO: Solo Tackles, AST: Assisted Tackles, TOT: Total Tackles, TFL: Tackles-for-loss, SACK: Quarterback Sacks, INT: Interceptions, BU: Passes Broken Up, PD: Passes Defended, QBH: Quarterback Hits, FR: Fumbles Recovered, FF: Forced Fumbles

==== Special teams ====
Kicking statistics
| # | NAME | POS | XPM | XPA | XP% | FGM | FGA | FG% | 1–19 | 20–29 | 30–39 | 40–49 | 50+ | LNG |
|---|---|---|---|---|---|---|---|---|---|---|---|---|---|---|
| 39 | Nico Radicic | K | 69 | 69 | 100 | 9 | 10 | 90 | 1/1 | 4/4 | 2/2 | 2/3 | 0/0 | 41 |
| | TOTALS | | 69 | 69 | 100 | 9 | 10 | 90 | 1/1 | 4/4 | 2/2 | 2/3 | 0/0 | 41 |

Punting statistics
| # | NAME | POS | PUNTS | YDS | AVG | LONG | TB | I–20 | 50+ | BLK |
|---|---|---|---|---|---|---|---|---|---|---|
| 94 | James Evans | P | 30 | 326 | 44.2 | 58 | 0 | 10 | 8 | 0 | |
| | TOTALS | | 30 | 1,326 | 44.2 | 58 | 0 | 10 | 8 | 0 |

Kick return statistics
| # | NAME | POS | RTNS | YDS | AVG | TD | LNG |
|---|---|---|---|---|---|---|---|
| 12 | Solomon Vanhorse | RB | 4 | 84 | 21.0 | 0 | 32 |
| 5 | Ke'Shawn Williams | WR | 1 | 25 | 25.0 | 0 | 25 |
| | TOTALS | | 5 | 109 | 21.8 | 0 | 32 |

Punt return statistics
| # | NAME | POS | RTNS | YDS | AVG | TD | LONG |
|---|---|---|---|---|---|---|---|
| 4 | Myles Price | WR | 23 | 289 | 12.6 | 0 | 65 |
| 5 | Ke'Shawn Williams | WR | 2 | 36 | 18.0 | 0 | 22 |
| 5 | D'Angelo Ponds | CB | 1 | 12 | 12.0 | 0 | 12 |
| 91 | Daniel Ndukwe | DL | 1 | 9 | 9 | 0 | 9 |
| | TOTALS | | 27 | 346 | 12.8 | 0 | 65 |

== Awards and honors ==
Weekly Awards
| Recipient | Award | Date | Ref. |
|---|---|---|---|
| Kurtis Rourke | Big Ten Offensive Player of the Week | Sept. 16 | |
| Kurtis Rourke | Davey O'Brien Award Great 8 | Sept. 16 | |
| Kurtis Rourke | Manning Award Star of the Week | Sept. 16 | |
| Kurtis Rourke | Manning Award Quarterback of the Week | Sept. 18 | |
| James Evans | Ray Guy Award Ray's 8 | Oct. 1 | |
| Kurtis Rourke | Big Ten Co-Offensive Player of the Week | Oct. 7 | |
| D'Angelo Ponds | Big Ten Defensive Player of the Week | Oct. 28 | |
| James Evans | Ray Guy Award Ray's 8 | Oct. 28 | |
| D'Angelo Ponds | Jim Thorpe Award National Defensive Back of the Week | Oct. 29 | |
| D'Angelo Ponds | Lott IMPACT Trophy Player of the Week | Oct. 30 | |
| D'Angelo Ponds | Bronko Nagurski National Defensive Player of the Week | Nov. 1 | |
| Kurtis Rourke | Davey O'Brien Award Great 8 | Nov. 4 | |
| Mikail Kamara | Walter Camp National Defensive Player of the Week | Nov. 5 | |
| Mikail Kamara | Bednarik National Defensive Player of the Week | Nov. 5 | |
| Kurtis Rourke | Resse's Senior Bowl Player of the Week | Nov. 6 | |
| Kurtis Rourke | Big Ten Co-Offensive Player of the Week | Dec. 2 | |
| Jailin Walker | Big Ten Defensive Player of the Week | Dec. 2 | |
| Kurtis Rourke | Davey O’Brien Award Great 8 | Dec. 2 | |

Individual Awards
| Recipient | Position | Award | Ref. |
|---|---|---|---|
| Curt Cignetti | HC | AP Coach of the Year | |
| Curt Cignetti | HC | AFCA Coach of the Year | |
| Curt Cignetti | HC | Eddie Robinson Coach of the Year | |
| Curt Cignetti | HC | Home Depot Coach of the Year | |
| Curt Cignetti | HC | Sporting News Coach of the Year | |
| Curt Cignetti | HC | Walter Camp Coach of the Year | |
| Curt Cignetti | HC | Hayes–Schembechler Coach of the Year | |
| Curt Cignetti | HC | Dave McClain Coach of the Year | |
| Curt Cignetti | HC | AP Big Ten Coach of the Year | |
| Mike Shanahan | OC | FootballScoop Offensive Coordinator of the Year | |
| Kurtis Rourke | QB | Jon Cornish Trophy | |
| Mike Katic | C | Big Ten Sportsmanship Award | |

NCAA Recognized All-Americans Honors
| Player | AP | AFCA | FWAA | TSN | WCFF | Designation |
|---|---|---|---|---|---|---|
| Aiden Fisher | – | – | 1st | 2nd | – | None |
| Mikail Kamara | 3rd | – | – | – | – | None |
| D'Angelo Ponds | – | – | 2nd | – | – | None |
The NCAA recognizes a selection to all five of the AP, AFCA, FWAA, TSN and WCFF first teams for unanimous selections and three of five for consensus selections. HM = Honorable mention. References:

Other All-American Honors
| Player | Athletic | Athlon | CBS | CFN | ESPN | FOX | PFF | PS | SI | USAT |
|---|---|---|---|---|---|---|---|---|---|---|
| Aiden Fisher | – | | – | | | | – | 1st | 2nd | – |
| Mikail Kamara | 2nd | | – | | | | – | HM | HM | – |
| D'Angelo Ponds | 2nd | | 2nd | | | | – | 2nd | HM | 2nd |
| Kurtis Rourke | – | | – | | | | – | HM | – | – |
| Elijah Sarratt | – | | – | | | | – | HM | – | – |
HM = Honorable mention. References:

All-Big Ten
| Player | Position | Coaches | Media | AP |
|---|---|---|---|---|
| **Mikail Kamara** | DL | 1st | 1st | 1st |
| **Aiden Fisher** | LB | 1st | 1st | 1st |
| **D'Angelo Ponds** | DB | 1st | 1st | 1st |
| Kurtis Rourke | QB | 2nd | 2nd | 2nd |
| Elijah Sarratt | WR | 3rd | 3rd | 2nd |
| Mike Katic | C | HM | 3rd | – |
| Justice Ellison | RB | HM | HM | – |
| Zach Horton | TE | HM | HM | – |
| Carter Smith | OT | HM | HM | – |
| James Carpenter | DL | HM | HM | – |
| Jailin Walker | LB | HM | HM | – |
| CJ West | LB | HM | HM | – |
| Mark Langston | LS | HM | HM | – |
| Myles Price | WR/RS | – | HM | – |
| Lanell Carr Jr. | DL | – | HM | – |
| Shawn Asbury II | DB | – | HM | – |
| Nico Radicic | K | – | HM | – |
**Bold** = Consensus selection. HM = Honorable mention. References:

Academic All-Big Ten
| Player | Position | Major |
|---|---|---|
| Clayton Allen | | Informatics |
| Austin Barrett | | Criminal Justice |
| Reece Bellin | | Finance |
| Aden Cannon | | Sport Marketing & Management |
| Anthony Chung | | Biology BS |
| Clay Conner | | Policy Analysis |
| Drew Evans | | Biology BS |
| James Evans | | Management |
| Vince Fiacable | | Management Graduate Certificate |
| Brody Foley | | Sport Marketing & Management |
| Jack Greer | | Marketing |
| Cooper Jones | | Psychology BA |
| Isaiah Jones | | Management |
| Camden Jordan | | Sport Marketing & Management |
| Bray Lynch | | Management |
| Jaxon Miller | | Sport Marketing & Management |
| Lincoln Murff | | Psychology BA |
| Alejandro Quintero | | Exercise Science |
| Kaiden Turner | | Sport Marketing & Management |
| Andrew Turvy | | Informatics |
| Trey Walker | | MBA |
| Finn Walters | | Finance |
| Jackson Wasserstrom | | Marketing |
| Daniel Weems | | Sport Marketing & Management |
| Sam West | TE | Management |
| Max Williams | | Management |
HM = Honorable mention. Source:

== Rankings ==
Ranking movements Legend: ██ Increase in ranking ██ Decrease in ranking — = Not ranked RV = Received votes т = Tied with team above or below
| | Week | | | | | | | | | | | | | | | | |
| Poll | Pre | 1 | 2 | 3 | 4 | 5 | 6 | 7 | 8 | 9 | 10 | 11 | 12 | 13 | 14 | 15 | Final |
|---|---|---|---|---|---|---|---|---|---|---|---|---|---|---|---|---|---|
| AP | — | — | — | RV | RV | 23 | 18т | 16 | 13 | 13 | 8 | 5 | 5 | 10 | 9 | 9 | 10 |
| Coaches | — | — | RV | RV | RV | 24 | 20 | 18 | 13 | 13 | 10 | 6 | 5 | 10 | 9 | 9 | 10 |
| CFP | Not released | | | | | | | | | | 8 | 5 | 5 | 10 | 9 | 8 | Not released |
