= Shawn Asbury II =

American football player (born 2004)

No. 1
- Position: Safety

Personal information
- Listed height: 5 ft 9 in (1.75 m)
- Listed weight: 194 lb (88 kg)

Career information
- High school: North Stafford (Stafford, Virginia)
- College: Boston College (2021); Old Dominion (2022–2023); Indiana (2024)
- Stats at ESPN

Shawn Asbury II is an American former college football safety for the Boston College Eagles, Old Dominion Monarchs, and Indiana Hoosiers.

== Early life ==
Asbury attended North Stafford High School in Stafford, Virginia where he played football and basketball. Asbury was named to the Virginia 5A All-State Team during his junior year leading him to commit to play college football for the Virginia Tech Hokies. In August 2020, Asbury stated that he would be an early enrollee at Virginia Tech, but would flip his commitment to Boston College in November after earning his second Virginia 5A All-State honor.

== College career ==
=== Boston College ===
Asbury was the backup safety during the 2021 season. Asbury made his collegiate debut against Colgate, where he made two tackles in the 51–0 win. After appearing in the first seven games, Asbury would miss the last five games due to an arm injury. In his freshman season, Asbury tallied five tackles and two pass deflections. On December 9, he entered the transfer portal.

=== Old Dominion ===
On December 30, 2021, Asbury transferred to Old Dominion. Asbury made his Monarchs debut in the 2022 season opener against Virginia Tech making two tackles in the process. He made a career-high seven tackles against Coastal Carolina. Asbury recorded the first interception of his career against Marshall while recording six tackles and a tackle for loss. In 2022, Asbury played in 11 games making three starts while notching 32 total tackles (12 solo), four tackles for loss, two pass deflections, an interception, and a fumble recovery.

Asbury began the 2023 season against Virginia Tech, making eight tackles and a tackle for loss in the loss. Against Texas A&M–Commerce, Asbury totaled a career-best 15 tackles and two and a half tackles for loss in the 10–9 win. He made his first interception of the season against No. 25 James Madison. Asbury would play in the Famous Toastery Bowl before entering the transfer portal on January 1, 2024.

=== Indiana ===
On January 5, 2024, Asbury transferred to Indiana.

=== College statistics ===
Year	Team	Games		Tackles					Interceptions					Fumbles		
Year	Team	GP	GS	Solo	Ast	Cmb	TfL	Sck	Int	Yds	Avg	TD	PD	FR	FF	TD
2021	Boston College	7	0	5	0	5	0.0	0.0	0	0	—	0	2	0	0	0
2022	Old Dominion	11	3	12	20	32	4.0	0.0	1	10	10.0	0	2	1	0	0
2023	Old Dominion	12	12	38	55	93	6.0	0.0	1	46	46.0	0	4	0	0	0
2024	Indiana	8	8	17	28	45	4.0	1.5	1	78	78.0	0	2	0	0	0
Career		38	23	72	103	175	14.0	1.5	3	134	44.7	0	10	1	0	0

== Professional career ==
Pre-draft measurables
Height	Weight	Arm length	Hand span	40-yard dash	10-yard split	20-yard split	20-yard shuttle	Three-cone drill	Vertical jump	Broad jump	Bench press
5 ft 9 1/2 in (1.77 m)	194 lb (88 kg)	30 1/8 in (0.77 m)	8 3/4 in (0.22 m)	4.58 s	1.63 s	2.65 s	4.58 s	7.26 s	34.0 in (0.86 m)	10 ft 2 in (3.10 m)	9 reps
All values from Pro Day
