= Justice Ellison =

American football coach and former player

Current position
- Title: Assistant running backs coach
- Team: Indiana
- Conference: Big Ten

Playing career
- 2020–2023: Wake Forest
- 2024: Indiana
- Position: Running back

Coaching career (HC unless noted)
- 2025: Indiana (QC)
- 2026–present: Indiana (Asst. RB)

Accomplishments and honors

Awards
- Third-team All-ACC (2022)

Justice Ellison is an American former college football running back who currently serves as the assistant running backs coach of the Indiana Hoosiers.

== Early life ==
Ellison attended Flint Hill School in Oakton, Virginia. He was rated as a two-star recruit and committed to play college football for the Wake Forest Demon Deacons.

== College career ==
=== Wake Forest ===
As a freshman in 2020, Ellison ran for 113 yards on 30 attempts. In 2021, he rushed 107 times for 541 yards and seven touchdowns, while also totaling seven receptions for 37 yards and a touchdown. In 2022, Ellison rushed for 699 yards and six touchdowns on 170 carries, while also hauling in six receptions for 62 yards. In 2023, he rushed for 548 yards and a touchdown on 120 carries, while also hauling in ten receptions for 61 yards, earning third-team all-Atlantic Coast Conference (ACC) honors. After the season, Ellison entered his name into the NCAA transfer portal.

=== Indiana ===
Ellison transferred to play for the Indiana Hoosiers. In week 8 of the 2024 season, he rushed for 105 yards and two touchdowns on nine carries in a win over Nebraska. In week 9, Ellison ran for 123 yards and a touchdown in a win over Washington.

=== College statistics ===
Year	Team	Games		Rushing				Receiving			
Year	Team	GP	GS	Att	Yds	Avg	TD	Rec	Yds	Avg	TD
2020	Wake Forest	8	0	30	113	3.8	1	1	3	3.0	0
2021	Wake Forest	11	0	107	541	5.1	7	7	37	5.3	1
2022	Wake Forest	13	10	170	699	4.1	6	6	62	10.3	0
2023	Wake Forest	11	10	120	548	4.6	1	10	61	6.1	0
2024	Indiana	13	7	159	848	5.3	10	13	90	6.9	0
Career		56	27	586	2,749	4.7	25	37	253	6.8	1

== Coaching career ==
On March 8, 2025, Ellison announced his retirement from playing football, and joined his alma mater, Indiana, as a quality control coach on Curt Cignetti's staff. During the 2025 season, the Hoosiers went 16-0 and won the Big Ten title and the 2026 CFP National Championship. Ellison now serves as an assistant running backs coach for the Hoosiers.
