= Buddha Williams =

American college football coach

LeDominique Williams
Current position
- Title: Defensive ends coach
- Team: Indiana
- Conference: Big Ten

Biographical details
- Born: Cincinnati, Ohio, U.S.

Playing career
- 2006–2008: Charleston
- Position: Defensive back

Coaching career (HC unless noted)
- 2010: Charleston (LB)
- 2011: Ashland (GA, defense)
- 2012–2013: Ohio (GA, defense)
- 2014–2015: Illinois (GA, defense)
- 2016: UT Martin (DL)
- 2017–2021: North Dakota State (DE)
- 2022–2023: Colorado State (DL)
- 2024–present: Indiana (DE)

LeDominique "Buddha"' Williams is an American college football coach and former defensive back who is the current defensive ends coach of the Indiana Hoosiers. He played college football for the Charleston Golden Eagles.

== College career ==
Williams played as a defensive back for three years for the Charleston Golden Eagles. He produced 130 tackles with 11 for loss and 2 sacks. He previously held the school record for single-game tackles with 17 against West Virginia State in 2006.

== Coaching career ==
=== Early coaching ===
Williams began his coaching career in 2010 at Charleston as a linebackers coach. He then served as a graduate assistant at Ashland for one season in 2011. Starting in 2012, while working on his master's degree, he worked as a graduate assistant in defense at Ohio until 2013. He spent two seasons at Illinois as a graduate assistant in defense from 2014 to 2015. In 2016 he joined UT Martin as a defensive ends coach.

=== North Dakota State (2017–2021) ===
Williams then worked as a defensive line coach at NDSU for five years from 2017 to 2021, where he was part of four NCAA Division I FCS titles and four MVFC championships. In his first season, Williams oversaw the position group after all-American defensive end Greg Menard suffered an ACL injury in fall camp. He was credited with developing three FCS All-Americans, including 2019 MVFC DPOY Derrek Tuszka.

=== Colorado State (2022–2023) ===
Following five seasons at NDSU, Williams left in 2022 to join Colorado State as a defensive line coach. Williams oversaw the recruitment of 2022 World Games sumo gold medal winner and defensive lineman Hidetora Hanada, after being contacted by Ottawa Redblacks defensive line coach and former Illinois defensive coordinator and defensive line coach Mike Phair. Williams also coached second-team All-Mountain West player and future 5th-round draft pick linebacker Mohamed Kamara. Williams saw interest from other schools prior to the 2023 season, but chose to stay for the rest of the season following efforts by coach Jay Norvell.

=== Indiana (2024–present) ===
Williams was announced as defensive ends coach by Indiana head coach Curt Cignetti on December 13, 2023. He started his first season at IU in the 2024 season, seeing a run to the College Football Playoff as well as overseeing the highest ranked rushing defense in the country. Defensive end Mikail Kamara earned first-team All-Big Ten and second-team All-American honors under Williams' coaching.

== Personal life ==
Williams graduated from Charleston with a bachelor's degree in business administration in 2009. He later earned a master's degree in recreation and sports science while working as a graduate assistant at Ohio University in 2013.

Williams has a wife, Veronica, two daughters, Alexis and Gianna, and a son, Dominic.
