= Ke'Shawn Williams =

American football player (born 2001)

Ke’Shawn Williams
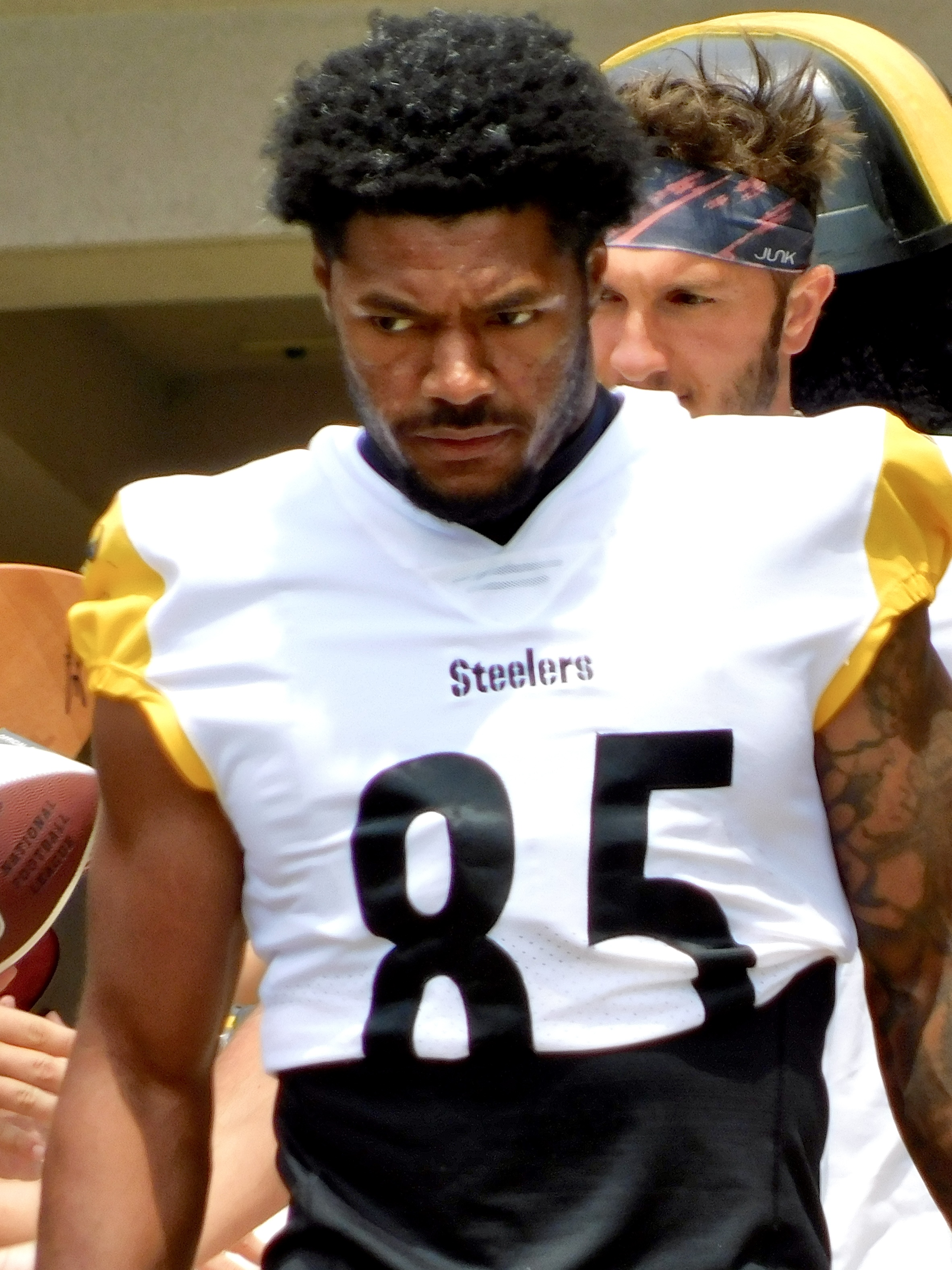
- Williams with the Pittsburgh Steelers in 2025

No. 12 – Cincinnati Bengals
- Positions: Wide receiver, kick returner
- Roster status: Practice squad

Personal information
- Born: December 27, 2001 (age 24); Philadelphia, Pennsylvania, U.S.
- Listed height: 5 ft 9 in (1.75 m)
- Listed weight: 188 lb (85 kg)

Career information
- High school: Springside Chestnut Hill Academy (Philadelphia, Pennsylvania)
- College: Wake Forest (2020–2023); Indiana (2024)
- NFL draft: 2025: undrafted

Career history
- Pittsburgh Steelers (2025); Cincinnati Bengals (2025–present)

Career NFL statistics
- Receptions: 1
- Receiving yards: 5
- Punt return yards: 112
- Kick return yards: 425
- Touchdowns: 0
- Stats at Pro Football Reference

Ke’Shawn Williams (born December 27, 2001) is an American professional football wide receiver and kick returner for the Cincinnati Bengals of the National Football League (NFL). He played college football for the Wake Forest Demon Deacons and Indiana Hoosiers.

== Early life ==
Williams was born in Philadelphia, Pennsylvania, and attended Springside Chestnut Hill Academy. He was a three star recruit and rated a top 25 prospect in the state of Pennsylvania. He was named to the All-Southeastern Pennsylvania team his senior year. As a senior, Williams also lettered in track and field as well as basketball.

== College career ==
His collegiate career began at Wake Forest in 2020. In his four seasons with the Demon Deacons, Williams accumulated 46 appearances with 11 starts. After transferring to the Hoosiers ahead of the 2024 season, he played in all 13 of their regular season games. He ended his college tenure with 2,640 all purpose yards and achieved a single 100-yard receiving game.

== Professional career ==
Pre-draft measurables
Height	Weight	Arm length	Hand span	Wingspan	40-yard dash	10-yard split	20-yard split	20-yard shuttle	Three-cone drill	Vertical jump	Broad jump	Bench press
5 ft 9 in (1.75 m)	188 lb (85 kg)	30 in (0.76 m)	9 3/4 in (0.25 m)	5 ft 11 5/8 in (1.82 m)	4.50 s	1.59 s	2.56 s	4.34 s	6.98 s	39.0 in (0.99 m)	10 ft 1 in (3.07 m)	6 reps
All values from Pro Day

=== Pittsburgh Steelers ===
In the 2025 NFL draft, Williams went undrafted. On April 27, 2025, he signed as an undrafted free agent with the Pittsburgh Steelers. He was waived on August 26 as part of final roster cuts, and re-signed to the practice squad. On October 11, Williams was signed to the active roster. He was waived on December 15.

=== Cincinnati Bengals ===
On December 16, 2025, Williams was claimed off waivers by the Cincinnati Bengals.

On September 27, 2026, against Pittsburgh, Williams muffed Cameron Johnston's punt in the fourth quarter. Pittsburgh recovered at Cincinnati's 14-yard line and kicked a field goal to tie the game 27–27. The Steelers ultimately won 30–27. On September 29, Williams was waived by the Bengals and re-signed to the practice squad two days later.
