= Grant Cain =

American football coach

- Cain at the White House

Current position
- Title: Special teams coordinator and tight ends coordinator
- Team: Indiana
- Conference: Big Ten

Biographical details
- Born: Atlanta, Georgia, U.S.

Playing career
- 1999–2002: Catawba
- Position: Defensive back

Coaching career (HC unless noted)
- 2003–2004: Catawba (Defensive Assistant)
- 2005: Colorado Crush (Defensive Assistant)
- 2005–2012: Coastal Carolina (GA/OLB/DE)
- 2013–2018: Mercer (RC/ST/ILB/AHC)
- 2019–2023: James Madison (ST/TE/AHC)
- 2024–present: Indiana (ST/TE)

Grant Cain is an American football coach and former defensive back who is the current special teams coordinator and tight ends coordinator for the Indiana Hoosiers. He played college football for the Catawba Indians.

== Early life and education ==
In high school, Cain played for Harrison High School in Kennesaw, Georgia, where he was recognized with All-county honors and contributed to three state playoff appearances and one regional title.

Cain played as a defensive back for 4 years for the Catawba Indians. In his senior year, he earned team captain honors. While on the team, the Indians made the NCAA Division II Football Championship playoffs in all four seasons, including a semifinal run in 2001.

== Coaching career ==
=== Early coaching ===
Following graduation from Catawba, Cain was first hired as a defensive analyst at Catawba College under head coach Chip Hester for the 2003 and 2004 seasons. He then was hired for one season in 2005 as a defensive analyst for the Colorado Crush of the AFL, where the team won the ArenaBowl.

=== Coastal Carolina (2005–2012) ===
Cain was started at Coastal Carolina in late 2005 as a graduate assistant. From 2007 until 2009, he worked as the outside linebackers coach. Under Cain, the Chanticleers in 2007 ranked in the top 23 teams in the nation for sacks and tackles for loss. They also lead the Big South in sacks and was second in tackles for loss in the 2009 season. In his 6th season with the Chanticleers, he transitioned to defensive ends coach, where the team lead the Big South in tackles for loss and ranked 16th in the national rankings for TFL.

=== Mercer (2013–2018) ===
Cain was hired by head coach Bobby Lamb in early 2012. Cain was initially hired as inside linebackers and special teams coach. Under Cain in 2014, wide receiver and return specialist Chandler Curtis earned the first All-American honors in the program's history. In the 2016 season, Mercer led the Southern Conference in fumbles recovered, also ranking 6th nationally. Prior to the 2017 season he was promoted to assistant head coach. In the 2017 season, Mercer led the Southern Conference in turnovers gained and red-zone defense, while leading the FCS in kick return defense and the nation in fumbles recovered. In the 2018 season, Cain's special teams led the nation in net punt yards and ranked 12th in the FCS for yards per return.

=== James Madison (2019–2023) ===
Cain was hired at JMU in early 2019 as an assistant coach for tight ends and as a special teams coordinator. He was first approached by then JMU head coach Curt Cignetti on a cold call. He was hired alongside assistant coach Andrew Jackson, with Cignetti citing Cain's coaching experience at Mercer and Coastal Carolina, and the special teams success at both schools. In his first season, JMU led the country in blocked kicks and set a school and conference record for field goals under kicker Ethan Ratke. Under Cain in 2021, JMU was first in field goals per game, and fourth in kick-return average and field goal percentage. He was promoted to assistant head coach ahead of the 2022 season.

=== Indiana (2024–present) ===
Cain, along with 6 other assistant coaches, followed Cignetti to Indiana following his hiring as head coach ahead of the 2024 season. He was hired as both a special teams and tight end coach, continuing his roles from JMU. In Cain's first season at IU, the Hoosiers had the most blocked kicks in the Big Ten, ranking 6th nationally. IU also had the third-highest graded special teams in the Power 4 conferences. Under Cain, kicker Nico Radicic led the FBS in extra points per game with a program record for single season extra points made. Radicic also finished at 66th in the scoring list for the 2024 season.

== Personal life ==
Cain graduated in 2003 from Catawba with a bachelor's in business administration. He also earned his master's in 2007 in instructional technology from Coastal Carolina.

Cain has a wife, Shauna, and two sons, Caleb and Samuel. His younger brothers Austin and Blake both played for Coastal Carolina as punters. His third brother, Travis, played for Coastal Carolina as a defensive back.
