= CJ West =

American football player (born 2002)

No. 90 – San Francisco 49ers
- Position: Defensive tackle
- Roster status: Active

Personal information
- Born: June 12, 2002 (age 24); Chicago, Illinois, U.S.
- Listed height: 6 ft 1 in (1.85 m)
- Listed weight: 316 lb (143 kg)

Career information
- High school: Nazareth Academy (La Grange Park, Illinois)
- College: Kent State (2020–2023); Indiana (2024)
- NFL draft: 2025: 4th round, 113th overall pick

Career history
- San Francisco 49ers (2025–present)

Awards and highlights
- Third-team All-MAC (2023)

Career NFL statistics as of 2025
- Tackles: 21
- Sacks: 1
- Stats at Pro Football Reference

Chaddrian "CJ" West Jr. (born June 12, 2002) is an American professional football defensive tackle for the San Francisco 49ers of the National Football League (NFL). He played college football for the Kent State Golden Flashes and Indiana Hoosiers. West was selected by the 49ers in the fourth round of the 2025 NFL draft.

== Early life ==
West was born on June 12, 2002 in Chicago, Illinois. He attended Nazareth Academy in La Grange Park, Illinois. He committed to Kent State University to play college football.

== College career ==
West attended Kent State from 2020 to 2023. Over the four years, he started 35 of 39 games, recording 110 tackles and eight sacks.

After the 2023 season, West entered the transfer portal and transferred to Indiana University Bloomington. In his lone year at Indiana, West had 40 tackles and two sacks.

== Professional career ==
Pre-draft measurables
Height	Weight	Arm length	Hand span	Wingspan	40-yard dash	10-yard split	20-yard split	Vertical jump	Bench press
6 ft 1 1/8 in (1.86 m)	316 lb (143 kg)	31 1/2 in (0.80 m)	9 3/4 in (0.25 m)	6 ft 7 1/8 in (2.01 m)	4.95 s	1.73 s	2.87 s	33.0 in (0.84 m)	28 reps
All values from NFL Combine/Pro Day

West was selected in the fourth round (113th overall) by the San Francisco 49ers at the 2025 NFL draft. On June 13, he signed his rookie contract with the 49ers. West made 14 appearances for San Francisco during his rookie campaign.

On September 23, 2026, West was placed on injured reserve due to a knee injury that required surgery. On November 21, 2026, West was activated from the injured reserve.

== NFL career statistics ==
=== Regular season ===
Year	Team	Games		Tackles					Interceptions						Fumbles				
Year	Team	GP	GS	Cmb	Solo	Ast	Sck	TFL	Int	Yds	Avg	Lng	TD	PD	FF	Fum	FR	Yds	TD
2025	SF	14	0	21	12	9	1.0	2	0	0	0.0	0	0	0	0	0	0	0	0
Career		14	0	21	12	9	1.0	2	0	0	0.0	0	0	0	0	0	0	0	0

=== Postseason ===
Year	Team	Games		Tackles					Interceptions						Fumbles				
Year	Team	GP	GS	Cmb	Solo	Ast	Sck	TFL	Int	Yds	Avg	Lng	TD	PD	FF	Fum	FR	Yds	TD
2025	SF	2	0	5	5	0	1.0	2	0	0	0.0	0	0	0	0	0	0	0	0
Career		2	0	5	5	0	1.0	2	0	0	0.0	0	0	0	0	0	0	0	0
