= Bryant Haines =

American football player and coach (born 1985)

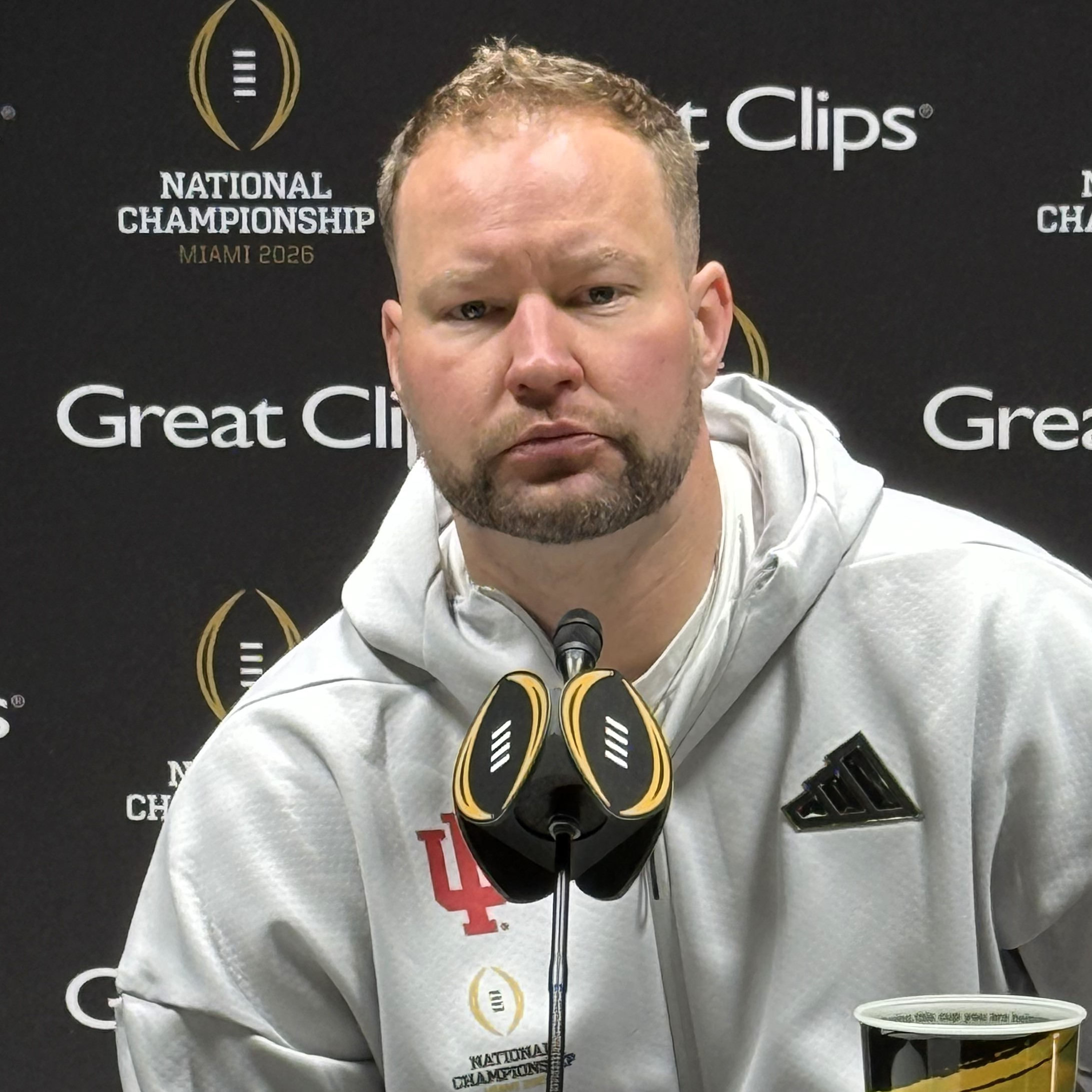
- Haines in 2026

Current position
- Title: Defensive coordinator & linebackers coach
- Team: Indiana
- Conference: Big Ten

Biographical details
- Born: October 17, 1985 (age 40); London, Ohio, U.S.

Playing career
- 2004–2008: Ball State
- Position: Linebacker

Coaching career (HC unless noted)
- 2009: Manchester (DL)
- 2010–2011: Adrian (S&C/DL)
- 2012: Indiana (GA)
- 2013: Ohio State (GA)
- 2014–2015: IUP (S&C/DL)
- 2016: UC Davis (LB)
- 2017–2018: Elon (LB)
- 2019–2021: James Madison (co-DC/LB)
- 2022–2023: James Madison (DC/LB)
- 2024–present: Indiana (DC/LB)

Accomplishments and honors

Awards
- Broyles Award (2025); AFCA Assistant Coach of the Year (2025); Third-team All-MAC (2008)

Bryant Travis Haines (born October 17, 1985) is an American football coach and former linebacker who is the current defensive coordinator and linebackers coach of the Indiana Hoosiers. He played college football for the Ball State Cardinals where he earned All-MAC honors before retiring and becoming a coach.

== High school career ==
Haines played high school football at Piqua High School in Piqua, Ohio. He helped the team to a state runner-up finish as a freshman and a conference championship as a sophomore. As a senior, he made 35 catches for 700 yards with eight touchdowns, plus recorded 95 tackles and four interceptions. He earned All-Greater Western Ohio Conference twice, All-Dayton honors and a SuperPrep.com Preseason All-American. Haines also participated in the Ohio North-South All-Star game.

== College career ==
Haines played as a linebacker for the Ball State Cardinals from 2004 to 2008. After redshirting in 2004, he started all 11 games as a freshman in 2005, leading the team in tackles and earning College Football News Freshman All-America Second Team honors. Despite missing four games due to a knee injury in 2006, he returned to start the season's final two games. In 2007, Haines started all 13 games, leading the team in tackles and ranking 36th nationally with 9.62 tackles per game, and earned the Mid-American Conference West Division Defensive Player of the Week. As a senior in 2008, he played in 13 games, earning third-team All-MAC honors and was named to the Butkus Award Watch List. He concluded his collegiate career with 86 tackles in his final season.

== Coaching career ==
Following his graduation from Ball State in 2009 with a bachelor's degree in general studies, Haines began his coaching career as the defensive line coach at Manchester. He then served as the defensive line coach and strength and conditioning coordinator at Adrian from 2010 to 2011. In 2012, Haines became a defensive graduate assistant at Indiana, followed by a similar role at Ohio State in 2013, where he worked with the linebackers during the Buckeyes' undefeated regular season.

In 2014, Haines joined Curt Cignetti's staff at IUP as the defensive line coach and strength and conditioning coordinator. During his tenure, IUP led the Pennsylvania State Athletic Conference in several defensive categories. He then served as the linebackers coach at UC Davis in 2016, where he coached Nas Anesi to second-team All-Big Sky honors.

Haines continued his coaching career at Elon from 2017 to 2018 as the linebackers coach, mentoring players like Warren Messer to All-CAA and All-America honors. In December 2018, he joined James Madison as the co-defensive coordinator and linebackers coach, later being promoted to defensive coordinator. Under his guidance, JMU's defense consistently ranked among the top in the nation in various statistical categories.

In 2024, Haines reunited with head coach Curt Cignetti at Indiana, taking on the role of defensive coordinator and linebackers coach. That season, Indiana's defense ranked second nationally in yards allowed per game (256.3) and sixth in scoring defense (15.6 points per game). In 2025, Indiana's defense ranked fourth nationally in yards allowed per game (266.0) and second in scoring defense (11.7 points per game). Indiana won its first national championship with a perfect 16–0 record. On February 12, 2026, Haines won the Broyles Award, given annually to the nation's top assistant coach.

== Personal life ==
Haines is the son of Randy and Michele Haines. Haines and his long time girlfriend, Kira Williams, have a daughter. His brother, Tyler, played football at Defiance and also worked as an offensive coordinator at IUP. Tyler is currently the head coach at Catawba.
