= Zach Horton =

American football player (born 2000)

Profile
- Position: Tight end

Personal information
- Born: December 2, 2002 (age 23); Roanoke, Virginia, U.S.
- Listed height: 6 ft 4 in (1.93 m)
- Listed weight: 252 lb (114 kg)

Career information
- High school: Lord Botetourt (Daleville, Virginia)
- College: James Madison (2021–2023); Indiana (2024)
- NFL draft: 2025: undrafted

Career history
- Detroit Lions (2025)

Awards and highlights
- First-team All-Sun Belt (2023)

Career NFL statistics as of 2025
- Games played: 2
- Stats at Pro Football Reference

Zach Horton (born December 2, 2002) is an American professional football tight end. He played college football for the James Madison Dukes and Indiana Hoosiers before signing with the Lions as an undrafted free agent after the 2025 NFL draft.

== Early life ==
Horton attended Lord Botetourt High School in Daleville, Virginia. He was rated as a three-star recruit and committed to play college football for the James Madison Dukes over offers from schools such as Navy, Army, Air Force, Eastern Michigan, and Coastal Carolina.

== College career ==
=== James Madison ===
As a freshman in 2021, Horton appeared in eight games where he did not record any receptions. In 2022, he hauled in 13 receptions for 159 yards and two touchdowns as backup tight end. In week 5 of the 2023 season, Horton hauled in three receptions for 116 yards and two touchdowns in a 31–23 win over South Alabama. He had a breakout 2023 season as James Madison's starting tight end, where he recorded 27 receptions for 275 yards and six touchdowns, earning first-team all-Sun Belt Conference honors. After the season, Horton entered his name into the NCAA transfer portal.

=== Indiana ===
Horton transferred to play for the Indiana Hoosiers. He entered the 2024 season as the Hoosiers' starting tight end.

== Professional career ==
Pre-draft measurables
Height	Weight	Arm length	Hand span	Wingspan	40-yard dash	10-yard split	20-yard split	20-yard shuttle	Three-cone drill	Vertical jump	Broad jump	Bench press
6 ft 3 3/8 in (1.91 m)	251 lb (114 kg)	30 5/8 in (0.78 m)	9 3/4 in (0.25 m)	6 ft 2 3/8 in (1.89 m)	4.96 s	1.64 s	2.87 s	4.69 s	7.69 s	29.5 in (0.75 m)	8 ft 10 in (2.69 m)	19 reps
All values from Pro Day

Horton signed with the Detroit Lions as an undrafted free agent on May 9, 2025. He was waived on August 26 as part of final roster cuts, and re-signed to the practice squad. Horton signed a reserve/future contract with Detroit on January 5, 2026.

On July 31, 2026, Horton was waived. Four days later, Horton was re-signed after tight end Anthony Firkser was placed on injured reserve. On August 30, he was waived by Detroit as a part of final roster cuts.
