= 2024 Purdue Boilermakers football team =

American college football season

2024 Purdue Boilermakers football
- Conference: Big Ten Conference
- Record: 1–11 (0–9 Big Ten)
- Head coach: Ryan Walters (2nd season)
- Offensive coordinator: Graham Harrell (2nd season; first 4 games); Jason Simmons (interim)
- Offensive scheme: Air raid
- Defensive coordinator: Kevin Kane (2nd season)
- Base defense: Air strike
- Home stadium: Ross–Ade Stadium

2024 Big Ten Conference football standings
	Conf.			Overall
Team	W		L	W		L
No. 3 Oregon y$^	9	–	0	13	–	1
No. 10 Indiana ^	8	–	1	11	–	2
No. 5 Penn State y^	8	–	1	13	–	3
No. 1 Ohio State #^	7	–	2	14	–	2
No. 16 Illinois	6	–	3	10	–	3
Iowa	6	–	3	8	–	5
Michigan	5	–	4	8	–	5
Minnesota	5	–	4	8	–	5
USC	4	–	5	7	–	6
Rutgers	4	–	5	7	–	6
Washington	4	–	5	6	–	7
Nebraska	3	–	6	7	–	6
UCLA	3	–	6	5	–	7
Wisconsin	3	–	6	5	–	7
Northwestern	2	–	7	4	–	8
Maryland	1	–	8	4	–	8
Michigan State†	0	–	6	0	–	7
Purdue	0	–	9	1	–	11
Championship: Oregon 45, Penn State 37
# – College Football Playoff champion; ^ – College Football Playoff participant; $ – Conference champion; y – Championship game participant; † — NCAA vacated all wins for Michigan State (5–7, 3–6); Rankings from AP Poll

The 2024 Purdue Boilermakers football team represented Purdue University as a member of the Big Ten Conference during the 2024 NCAA Division I FBS football season. The Boilermakers were led by second-year head coach Ryan Walters. Purdue played home games at Ross–Ade Stadium located in West Lafayette, Indiana.

Despite a 49–0 win over Indiana State to start the season strong, the Boilermakers sputtered down the line, losing every single game after that. Purdue finished with a 1–11 record and a winless record in conference play, both for the first time since 2013. This includes the worst home loss in program history, a 66–7 loss to Notre Dame. On December 1, following a 66–0 loss to Indiana to end the season, Walters was fired as the Boilermakers head coach. The Boilermakers went 5–19 under Walters including a Big Ten record of 3–15.

== Schedule ==
Date	Time	Opponent	Site	TV	Result	Attendance
August 31	12:00 p.m.	Indiana State*	Ross–Ade Stadium; West Lafayette, IN	BTN	W 49–0	59,488
September 14	3:30 p.m.	No. 18 Notre Dame*	Ross–Ade Stadium; West Lafayette, IN (rivalry)	CBS	L 7–66	61,441
September 21	8:30 p.m.	at Oregon State*	Reser Stadium; Corvallis, OR	The CW	L 21–38	34,340
September 28	12:00 p.m.	Nebraska^{†}	Ross–Ade Stadium; West Lafayette, IN	Peacock	L 10–28	61,441
October 5	12:00 p.m.	at Wisconsin	Camp Randall Stadium; Madison, WI	BTN	L 6–52	76,091
October 12	3:30 p.m.	at No. 23 Illinois	Memorial Stadium; Champaign, IL (rivalry)	FS1	L 49–50 ^{OT}	55,815
October 18	8:00 p.m.	No. 2 Oregon	Ross–Ade Stadium; West Lafayette, IN	FOX	L 0–35	57,463
November 2	12:00 p.m.	Northwestern	Ross–Ade Stadium; West Lafayette, IN	BTN	L 20–26 ^{OT}	61,141
November 9	12:00 p.m.	at No. 2 Ohio State	Ohio Stadium; Columbus, OH	FOX	L 0–45	103,463
November 16	3:30 p.m.	No. 4 Penn State	Ross–Ade Stadium; West Lafayette, IN	CBS	L 10–49	58,346
November 22	8:00 p.m.	at Michigan State	Spartan Stadium; East Lansing, MI	FOX	L 17–24	57,558
November 30	7:00 p.m.	at No. 10 Indiana	Memorial Stadium; Bloomington, IN (Old Oaken Bucket)	FS1	L 0–66	53,082
*Non-conference game; ^{†}Homecoming; Rankings from AP Poll - Released prior to game; All times are in Eastern time; Source:

== Game summaries ==
=== Indiana State ===
Indiana State Sycamores at Purdue Boilermakers – Game summary

Quarter	1	2	3	4	Total
Sycamores	0	0	0	0	0
Boilermakers	7	14	14	14	49

at Ross–Ade Stadium, West Lafayette, Indiana

- Date: August 31
- Game time: 12:00 p.m. EDT
- Game weather: Sunny, 76 °F (24 °C)
- Game attendance: 59,488
- Referee: Gregory Blum
- TV announcers (BTN): Pat Boylan (play-by-play), J Leman (analyst), and Jordan Robinson (sideline reporter)
- Recap, ESPN, PurdueSports.com

Game information

First quarter

- 9:07 PUR – Max Klare 9-yard pass from Hudson Card (Spencer Porath kick) (Drive: 8 plays, 55 yards, 3:41; Purdue 7–0)

Second quarter

- 13:21 PUR – Jaron Tibbs 8-yard pass from Hudson Card (Spencer Porath kick) (Drive: 7 plays, 76 yards, 3:05; Purdue 14–0)
- 10:29 PUR – De'Nylon Morrissette 8-yard pass from Hudson Card (Spencer Porath kick) (Drive: 3 plays, 57 yards, 1:13; Purdue 21–0)

Third quarter

- 10:43 PUR – Reggie Love III 6-yard run (Spencer Porath kick), (Drive: 9 plays, 66 yards, 4:11; Purdue 28–0)
- 6:10 PUR – Leland Smith 31-yard pass from Hudson Card (Spencer Porath kick) (Drive: 4 plays, 50 yards, 1:34; Purdue 35–0)

Fourth quarter

- 11:13 PUR – Elijah Jackson 69-yard run (Spencer Porath kick), (Drive: 5 plays, 91 yards, 2:20; Purdue 42–0)
- 1:56 PUR – Jaheim Merriweather 4-yard run (Spencer Porath kick), (Drive: 5 plays, 35 yards, 1:48; Purdue 49–0)

Statistics	INST	PUR
First downs	11	27
Plays–yards	53–154	66–583
Rushes–yards	43–104	31–248
Passing yards	50	335
Passing: comp–att–int	5–10–0	30–35–0
Time of possession	30:29	29:31

Team	Category	Player	Statistics
Indiana State	Passing	Elijah Owens	5/10, 50 yards
Indiana State	Rushing	Elijah Owens	9 carries, 47 yards
Indiana State	Receiving	Rashad Rochelle	3 receptions, 26 yards
Purdue	Passing	Hudson Card	24/25, 273 yards, 4 TD
Purdue	Rushing	Devin Mockobee	11 carries, 89 yards
Purdue	Receiving	Max Klare	5 receptions, 71 yards, TD

=== No. 18 Notre Dame (rivalry) ===
No. 18 Notre Dame Fighting Irish at Purdue Boilermakers – Game summary

Quarter	1	2	3	4	Total
No. 18 Fighting Irish	14	28	10	14	66
Boilermakers	0	0	7	0	7

at Ross-Ade Stadium, West Lafayette, Indiana

- Date: September 14
- Game time: 3:30 p.m. EDT
- Game weather: Temperature: 89 °F (32 °C) • Wind: E 10 MPH • Weather: Sunny
- Game attendance: 61,441
- Referee: Jerry Magallanes
- TV announcers (CBS): Brad Nessler (play-by-play), Gary Danielson (analyst), and Jenny Dell (sideline reporter)
- Box score, Recap

Game information

First quarter

- 12:50 NDU – Jeremiyah Love 48-yard run (Mitch Jeter kick) (Drive: 5 plays, 75 yards, 2:10, Notre Dame 7–0)
- 1:53 NDU – Riley Leonard 3-yard run (Mitch Jeter kick) (Drive: 11 plays, 82 yards, 5:43, Notre Dame 14–0)

Second quarter

- 8:24 NDU – Riley Leonard 34-yard run (Mitch Jeter kick) (Drive: 7 plays, 68 yards, 3:16, Notre Dame 21–0)
- 2:10 NDU – Riley Leonard 13-yard run (Mitch Jeter kick) (Drive: 10 plays, 77 yards, 4:54, Notre Dame 28–0)
- 1:32 NDU – Boubacar Traore 34-yard interception (Mitch Jeter kick) (Notre Dame 35–0)
- 0:04 NDU – Jadarian Price 70-yard run (Mitch Jeter kick) (Drive: 1 plays, 60 yards, 0:37, Notre Dame 42–0)

Third quarter

- 12:41 NDU – Cooper Flanagan 28-yard pass from Steve Angeli (Mitch Jeter kick) (Drive: 2 plays, 32 yards, 0:40, Notre Dame 49–0)
- 9:33 PUR – De'Nylon Morrissette 5-yard pass from Hudson Card (Spencer Porath kick) (Drive: 6 plays, 75 yards, 3:08, Notre Dame 49–7)
- 5:39 NDU – Mitch Jeter 42-yard field goal (Drive: 7 plays, 51 yards, 3:54, Notre Dame 52–7)

Fourth quarter

- 14:52 NDU – Kevin Bauman 8-yard pass from Steve Angeli (Zac Yoakam kick) (Drive: 7 plays, 52 yards, 3:43, Notre Dame 59–7)
- 5:44 NDU – Kenny Minchey 5-yard run (Zac Yoakam kick) (Drive: 3 plays, 31 yards, 1:31, Notre Dame 66–7)

Statistics	ND	PUR
First downs	27	6
Plays–yards	70–578	49–162
Rushes–yards	44–362	25–38
Passing yards	216	124
Passing: comp–att–int	18–26–0	11–24–2
Time of possession	35:43	24:17

Team	Category	Player	Statistics
Notre Dame	Passing	Riley Leonard	11/16, 112 yards
Notre Dame	Rushing	Jeremiyah Love	10 carries, 109 yards, TD
Notre Dame	Receiving	Jayden Harrison	2 receptions, 47 yards
Purdue	Passing	Hudson Card	11/24, 124 yards, TD, 2 INT
Purdue	Rushing	Reggie Love III	10 carries, 61 yards
Purdue	Receiving	Kam Brown	1 reception, 52 yards

=== at Oregon State ===
Purdue Boilermakers at Oregon State Beavers – Game summary

Quarter	1	2	3	4	Total
Boilermakers	0	7	0	14	21
Beavers	7	10	7	14	38

at Reser Stadium, Corvallis, Oregon

- Date: September 21
- Game time: 8:30 p.m. EDT/5:30 p.m. PDT
- Game weather: Sunny, 76 °F (24 °C)
- Game attendance: 34,340
- Referee: Mark Duddy
- TV announcers (The CW): Ted Robinson (play-by-play), Ryan Leaf (analyst), and Nigel Burton (sideline reporter)
- Box score, Recap

Game information
First quarter
- ORST – Zakaih Saez 20-yard interception return (Everett Hayes kick), 7:37. Beavers 7–0.

Second quarter

- ORST – Anthony Hankerson 1-yard run (Everett Hayes kick), 14:14. Beavers 14–0. Drive: 12 plays, 71 yards, 7:34.
- PUR – Max Klare 32-yard pass from Hudson Card (Spencer Porath kick), 6:30. Beavers 14–7. Drive: 2 plays, 47 yards, 0:57.
- ORST – Everett Hayes 29-yard field goal, 0:03. Beavers 17–7. Drive: 11 plays, 81 yards, 2:33.

Third quarter

- ORST – Zachary Card 26-yard run (Everett Hayes kick), 0:50. Beavers 24–7. Drive: 4 plays, 50 yards, 2:05.

Fourth quarter

- PUR – Reggie Love III 2-yard run (Spencer Porath kick), 12:49. Beavers 24–14. Drive: 7 plays, 75 yards, 3:01.
- ORST – Jam Griffin 14-yard run (Everett Hayes kick), 9:57. Beavers 31–14. Drive: 6 plays, 75 yards, 2:52.
- PUR – Devin Mockobee 3-yard run (Spencer Porath kick), 6:59. Beavers 31–21. Drive: 6 plays, 75 yards, 2:58.
- ORST – Anthony Hankerson 12-yard run (Everett Hayes kick), 1:53. Beavers 38–21. Drive: 8 plays, 42 yards, 5:06.

Statistics	PUR	ORST
First downs	13	25
Plays–yards	47–319	75–445
Rushes–yards	30–263	57–341
Passing yards	56	104
Passing: comp–att–int	7–17–1	10–18–0
Time of possession	19:45	40:15

Team	Category	Player	Statistics
Purdue	Passing	Hudson Card	7/17, 56 yards, TD, INT
Purdue	Rushing	Devin Mockobee	16 carries, 168 yards, TD
Purdue	Receiving	Max Klare	2 receptions, 46 yards, TD
Oregon State	Passing	Gevani McCoy	10/18, 104 yards
Oregon State	Rushing	Jam Griffin	22 rushes, 137 yards, TD
Oregon State	Receiving	Trent Walker	3 receptions, 37 yards

=== Nebraska ===
Nebraska Cornhuskers at Purdue Boilermakers – Game summary

Quarter	1	2	3	4	Total
Cornhuskers	0	0	7	21	28
Boilermakers	0	0	3	7	10

at Ross–Ade Stadium, West Lafayette, Indiana

- Date: September 28
- Game time: 12:00 p.m. EDT
- Game weather: Cloudy, 70 °F (21 °C)
- Game attendance: 61,441
- Referee: Bryan Banks
- TV announcers (Peacock): Jac Collinsworth (play-by-play), Michael Robinson (analyst), and Caroline Pineda (sideline reporter)

Game information

First quarter

No scoring plays

Second quarter

No scoring plays

Third quarter

- (6:42) PUR – Spencer Porath 45-yard field goal (Drive: 13 plays, 55 yards, 8:08, Purdue 3–0)
- (2:49) NEB – Jahmal Banks 6-yard pass from Dylan Raiola, John Hohl kick (Drive: 9 plays, 70 yards, 3:53, Nebraska 7–3)

Fourth quarter

- (10:34) NEB – Dante Dowdell 1-yard run, John Hohl kick (Drive: 10 plays, 63 yards, 5:30, Nebraska 14–3)
- (6:13) NEB - Jacory Barney Jr. 25-yard run, John Hohl kick (Drive: 6 plays, 57 yards, 2:57, Nebraska 21–3)
- (5:38) NEB - John Bullock 29-yard interception return, John Hohl kick (Nebraska 28–3)
- (1:29) PUR - Leland Smith 15-yard pass from Hudson Card, Spencer Porath kick (Drive: 12 plays, 75 yards, 4:09, Nebraska 28–10)

Statistics	NEB	PUR
First downs	25	12
Plays–yards	59 / 418	56 / 224
Rushes–yards	32 / 161	31 / 50
Passing yards	257	174
Passing: comp–att–int	17–27–0	18–25–1
Time of possession	30:18	29:42

Team	Category	Player	Statistics
Nebraska	Passing	Dylan Raiola	17–27, 257 yds, 1 TD
Nebraska	Rushing	Jacory Barney Jr.	4 car, 66 yds, 1 TD
Nebraska	Receiving	Jahmal Banks	5 rec, 82 yds, 1 TD
Purdue	Passing	Hudson Card	18–25, 174 yrds, 1 TD, 1 INT
Purdue	Rushing	Devin Mockobee	13 car, 41 yds
Purdue	Receiving	Jaron Tibbs	5 rec, 46 yds

=== at Wisconsin ===
Purdue Boilermakers at Wisconsin Badgers – Game summary

Quarter	1	2	3	4	Total
Boilermakers	0	6	0	0	6
Badgers	14	7	21	10	52

at Camp Randall Stadium, Madison, Wisconsin

- Date: October 5
- Game time: 12:00 p.m. EDT
- Game weather: Sunny, 65 °F (18 °C); Wind: SE 14 mph
- Game attendance: 76,091
- Referee: Chris Coyte
- TV announcers (BTN): Mark Followill (play-by-play), Jake Butt (analyst), and Brooke Fletcher (sideline reporter)

Game information

First quarter

- WIS – Tawee Walker 12-yard run (Nathanial Vakos kick), 8:04 Wisconsin 7–0 Drive: 1 play, 12 yards, 0:05.
- WIS – Vinny Anthony 52-yard pass from Braedyn Locke (Nathanial Vakos kick), 1:56 Wisconsin 14–0 Drive: 6 plays, 91 yards, 2:30.

Second quarter

- PUR – Spencer Porath 21-yard field goal, 8:41. Wisconsin 14–3. Drive: 9 plays, 42 yards, 6:08.
- PUR – Spencer Porath 23-yard field goal, 3:27. Wisconsin 14–6. Drive: 8 plays, 46 yards, 3:27.
- WIS – Tawee Walker 1-yard run (Nathanial Vakos kick), 0:09 Wisconsin 21–6 Drive: 11 plays, 75 yards, 3:18.

Third quarter

- WIS – Trech Kekahuna 69-yard pass from Braedyn Locke (Nathanial Vakos kick), 12:14 Wisconsin 28–6 Drive: 5 plays, 75 yards, 2:46.
- WIS – Trech Kekahuna 25-yard pass from Braedyn Locke (Nathanial Vakos kick), 4:42 Wisconsin 35–6 Drive: 9 plays, 98 yards, 4:39.
- WIS – Tawee Walker 17-yard run (Nathanial Vakos kick), 0:12 Wisconsin 42–6 Drive: 9 plays, 78 yards, 3:41.

Fourth quarter

- WIS – Cade Yacamelli 30-yard run (Nathanial Vakos kick), 10:59 Wisconsin 49–6 Drive: 5 plays, 60 yards, 2:40.
- WIS – Nathanial Vakos 26-yard field goal, 6:15. Wisconsin 52–6. Drive: 7 plays, 51 yards, 4:27.

Statistics	PUR	WIS
First downs	10	28
Plays–yards	48–216	73–589
Rushes–yards	26–99	41–228
Passing yards	117	361
Passing: comp–att–int	12–22–0	21–32–2
Time of possession	28:13	31:47

Team	Category	Player	Statistics
Purdue	Passing	Hudson Card	11/21, 111 yards
Purdue	Rushing	Devin Mockobee	11 carries, 45 yards
Purdue	Receiving	Jahmal Edrine	2 receptions, 26 yards
Wisconsin	Passing	Braedyn Locke	20/31, 359 yards, 3 TD, 2 INT
Wisconsin	Rushing	Tawee Walker	19 carries, 94 yards, 3 TD
Wisconsin	Receiving	Trech Kekahuna	6 receptions, 134 yards, 2 TD

=== at No. 23 Illinois (rivalry) ===
Purdue Boilermakers at No. 23 Illinois Fighting Illini – Game summary

Quarter	1	2	3	4	OT	Total
Boilermakers	0	3	17	23	6	49
No. 23 Fighting Illini	10	14	3	16	7	50

at Memorial Stadium, Champaign, Illinois

- Date: October 12
- Game time: 3:30 p.m. EDT
- Game weather: Sunny, 82 °F (28 °C); Wind: SW 8 miles per hour (13 km/h)
- Game attendance: 55,815
- Referee: Ron Snodgrass
- TV announcers (FS1): Eric Collins (play-by-play) and Spencer Tillman (analyst)
- Box score, Recap

Game information

First quarter

- ILL – David Olano 30-yard field goal, 6:04. ILL 3–0. Drive: 8 plays, 51 yards, 3:45.
- ILL – Josh McCray 11-yard run (David Olano kick), 0:10. ILL 10–0. Drive: 8 plays, 73 yards, 4:26.

Second quarter

- PUR – Spencer Porath 22-yard field goal, 5:41. ILL 10–3. Drive: 9 plays, 74 yards, 4:30.
- ILL – Zakhari Franklin 8-yard pass from Luke Altmyer (David Olano kick), 1:56. ILL 17–3. Drive: 9 plays, 75 yards, 3:45.
- ILL – Josh McCray 6-yard pass from Luke Altmyer (David Olano kick), 0:19. ILL 24–3. Drive: 5 plays, 25 yards, 1:34.

Third quarter

- ILL – David Olano 49-yard field goal, 10:57. ILL 27–3. Drive: 9 plays, 44 yards, 4:03.
- PUR – Jahmal Edrine 53-yard pass from Ryan Browne (Spencer Porath kick), 7:43 ILL 27–10. Drive: 6 plays, 85 yards, 3:10.
- PUR – Will Heldt 16-yard fumble recovery (Spencer Porath kick), 7:35. ILL 27–17.
- PUR – Spencer Porath 24-yard field goal, 0:49. ILL 27–20. Drive: 6 plays, 64 yards, 2:35.

Fourth quarter

- ILL – Luke Altmyer 13-yard run (David Olano kick), 13:17. ILL 34–20. Drive: 5 plays, 75 yards, 2:32.
- PUR – Jaron Tibbs 8-yard pass from Ryan Browne (Max Klare pass), 10:31. ILL 34–28. Drive: 6 plays, 75 yards, 2:46.
- ILL – Josh McCray 3-yard run (missed try), 5:05. ILL 40–28. Drive: 10 plays, 75 yards, 5:26.
- PUR – Devin Mockobee 2-yard run (Spencer Porath kick), 1:35. ILL 40–35. Drive: 10 plays, 75 yards, 3:30.
- PUR – Devin Mockobee 13-yard pass from Ryan Browne (Jahmal Edrine pass) 0:46. PUR 43–40. Drive: 3 plays, 43 yards, 0:49.
- ILL – David Olano 38-yard field goal, 0:00. Tied 43–43. Drive: 7 plays, 53 yards, 0:42.

Overtime

- ILL – Pat Bryant 25-yard pass from Luke Altmyer (David Olano kick), 0:00. ILL 50–43. Drive: 1 plays, 25 yards, TOP 0:00.
- PUR – Arhmad Branch 3-yard run ( ), 0:00. ILL 50–49. Drive: 2 plays, 25 yards, TOP 0:00.

Statistics	PUR	ILL
First downs	21	28
Plays–yards	58–536	73–556
Rushes–yards	32–239	39–177
Passing yards	297	379
Passing: comp–att–int	18–26–0	20–34–0
Time of possession	26:49	33:11

Team	Category	Player	Statistics
Purdue	Passing	Ryan Browne	18/26, 297 yards, 3 TD
Purdue	Rushing	Ryan Browne	17 carries, 118 yards
Purdue	Receiving	Max Klare	6 receptions, 133 yards
Illinois	Passing	Luke Altmyer	20/34, 379 yards, 3 TD
Illinois	Rushing	Josh McCray	16 carries, 78 yards, 2 TD
Illinois	Receiving	Pat Bryant	4 receptions, 104 yards, 1 TD

=== No. 2 Oregon ===
No. 2 Oregon Ducks at Purdue Boilermakers – Game summary

Quarter	1	2	3	4	Total
No. 2 Ducks	14	7	0	14	35
Boilermakers	0	0	0	0	0

at Ross–Ade Stadium, West Lafayette, Indiana

- Date: October 18
- Game time: 8:00 p.m. EDT
- Game weather: Clear
- Game attendance: 57,463
- Referee: Jerry McGinn
- TV announcers (FOX): Tim Brando (play-by-play), Devin Gardner (analyst), and Josh Sims (sideline reporter)

Game information

First quarter

- ORE – Jordan James 8-yard run (Atticus Sappington kick), 11:46 Oregon 7–0 Drive: 7 plays, 75 yards, 3:14.
- ORE – Jordan James 1-yard run (Atticus Sappington kick), 3:34 Oregon 14–0 Drive: 11 plays, 80 yards, 4:58.

Second quarter

- ORE – Tez Johnson 12-yard pass from Dillon Gabriel (Atticus Sappington kick), 12:24 Oregon 21–0 Drive: 6 plays, 99 yards, 3:01.

Third quarter

No scoring plays

Fourth quarter

- ORE – Noah Whittington 8-yard pass from Dillon Gabriel (Atticus Sappington kick), 13:47 Oregon 28–0 Drive: 7 plays, 59 yards, 3:43.
- ORE – Jay Harris 12-yard run (Atticus Sappington kick), 8:13 Oregon 35–0 Drive: 8 plays, 55 yards, 4:47.

Statistics	ORE	PUR
First downs	25	16
Plays–yards	60–421	59–301
Rushes–yards	35–131	40–208
Passing yards	290	93
Passing: comp–att–int	21–25–1	9–19–1
Time of possession	29:58	30:02

Team	Category	Player	Statistics
Oregon	Passing	Dillon Gabriel	21/25, 290 yards, 2 TD, INT
Oregon	Rushing	Jordan James	10 carries, 50 yards, 2 TD
Oregon	Receiving	Evan Stewart	4 receptions, 96 yards
Purdue	Passing	Ryan Browne	9/19, 93 yards, INT
Purdue	Rushing	Reggie Love III	11 carries, 93 yards
Purdue	Receiving	Max Klare	3 receptions, 32 yards

=== Northwestern ===
Northwestern Wildcats at Purdue Boilermakers – Game summary

Quarter	1	2	3	4	OT	Total
Wildcats	10	7	0	3	6	26
Boilermakers	3	7	3	7	0	20

at Ross–Ade Stadium, West Lafayette, Indiana

- Date: November 2
- Game time: 12:00 p.m. EDT
- Game weather: • Sunny Temperature: 51 °F (11 °C) • Wind: 5 mph
- Game attendance: 61,141
- Referee: Bryan Banks
- TV announcers (BTN): Connor Onion (play-by-play), Matt Millen (analyst), and Elise Menaker (reporter)

Game information

First quarter

- (7:21) NU – Luke Akers 39-yard field goal (Drive: 12 plays, 48 yards, 6:18; Northwestern 3-0)
- (3:09) PUR – Spencer Porath 26-yard field goal (Drive: 10 plays, 67 yards, 4:12; 3-3)
- (0:38) NU – Joseph Himon II 51-yard run, Luke Akers kick (Drive: 6 plays, 75 yards, 2:31; Northwestern 10-3)

Second quarter

- (2:23) NU – Cam Porter 1-yard run, Luke Akers kick (Drive: 11 plays, 50 yards, 6:22; Northwestern 17-3)
- (0:25) PUR – Jahmal Edrine 6-yard pass from Hudson Card, Spencer Porath kick (Drive: 12 plays, 87 yards, 1:55; Northwestern 17-10)

Third quarter

- (2:44) PUR – Spencer Porath 24-yard field goal (Drive: 10 plays, 62 yards, 5:02; Northwestern 17-13)

Fourth quarter

- (10:14) NU – Luke Akers 41-yard field goal (Drive: 16 plays, 52 yards, 7:30; Northwestern 20-13)
- (5:16) PUR – Devin Mockobee 1-yard run, Spencer Porath kick (Drive: 11 plays, 75 yards, 4:58; 20-20)

Overtime

- NU – Joseph Himon II 22-yard pass from Jack Lausch (Drive: 2 plays, 25 yards, Northwestern 26-20)

Statistics	NW	PUR
First downs	19	16
Plays–yards	69-424	64-337
Rushes–yards	30-122	23-47
Passing yards	302	290
Passing: comp–att–int	25-39-1	25-41-0
Time of possession	35:01	24:59

Team	Category	Player	Statistics
Northwestern	Passing	Jack Lausch	23/35, 250 yards, TD
Northwestern	Rushing	Joseph Himon II	6 carries, 78 yards, TD
Northwestern	Receiving	Cam Porter	8 receptions, 85 yards
Purdue	Passing	Hudson Card	21/37, 267 yards, TD
Purdue	Rushing	Devin Mockobee	10 carries, 29 yards, TD
Purdue	Receiving	Max Klare	6 receptions, 78 yards

=== at No. 2 Ohio State ===
Purdue Boilermakers at No. 2 Ohio State Buckeyes – Game summary

Quarter	1	2	3	4	Total
Boilermakers	0	0	0	0	0
No. 2 Buckeyes	7	14	17	7	45

at Ohio Stadium, Columbus, Ohio

- Date: November 9
- Game time: 12:00 p.m. EST
- Game weather: Cloudy • Temperature: 56 °F (13 °C) • Wind: NE at 12 miles per hour (19 km/h)
- Game attendance: 103,463
- Referee: Chris Coyte
- TV announcers (FOX): Gus Johnson (play-by-play), Joel Klatt (analyst), and Jenny Taft (sideline reporter)

Game information

First quarter

- (6:02) OSU – Will Howard 1-yard run, Jayden Fielding kick (Drive: 4 plays, 8 yards, 1:59; Ohio State 7–0)

Second quarter

- (8:30) OSU – Gee Scott Jr. 15-yard pass from Will Howard, Jayden Fielding kick (Drive: 13 plays, 80 yards, 6:42; Ohio State 14–0)
- (0:27) OSU – Jeremiah Smith 17-yard pass from Will Howard, Jayden Fielding kick (Drive: 7 plays, 59 yards, 1:13; Ohio State 21–0)

Third quarter

- (8:34) OSU – Jayden Fielding 42 yard field goal (Drive: 13 plays, 59 yards, 6:21; Ohio State 24–0)
- (3:07) OSU – TreVeyon Henderson 19-yard run, Jayden Fielding kick (Drive: 5 plays, 76 yards, 2:36; Ohio State 31–0)
- (2:59) OSU – Jack Sawyer 11-yard fumble return, Jayden Fielding kick (Ohio State 38–0)

Fourth quarter

- (14:05) OSU – Emeka Egbuka 10-yard pass from Will Howard, Jayden Fielding kick (Drive: 6 plays, 74 yards, 2:58; Ohio State 45–0)

Statistics	PUR	OSU
First downs	15	23
Plays–yards	59–206	66–433
Rushes–yards	38–98	35–173
Passing yards	108	260
Passing: comp–att–int	9–21–1	21–31–0
Time of possession	29:11	30:49

Team	Category	Player	Statistics
Purdue	Passing	Hudson Card	9/19, 108 yards, 1 INT
Purdue	Rushing	Devin Mockobee	13 carries, 73 yards
Purdue	Receiving	Shamar Rigby	1 reception, 29 yards
Ohio State	Passing	Will Howard	21/26, 260 yards, 3 TD
Ohio State	Rushing	TreVeyon Henderson	6 carries, 85 yards, 1 TD
Ohio State	Receiving	Jeremiah Smith	6 receptions, 87 yards, 1 TD

=== No. 4 Penn State ===
No. 4 Penn State Nittany Lions at Purdue Boilermakers – Game summary

Quarter	1	2	3	4	Total
No. 4 Nittany Lions	14	7	21	7	49
Boilermakers	0	3	0	7	10

at Ross–Ade Stadium, West Lafayette, Indiana

- Date: November 16
- Game time: 3:30 p.m. EST
- Game weather: Sunny, 53 °F (12 °C)
- Game attendance: 58,346
- Referee: Jerry McGinn
- TV announcers (CBS): Brad Nessler (play-by-play), Gary Danielson (analyst), and Jenny Dell (sideline reporter)

Game information

First quarter

- PSU – Kaytron Allen, 2-yard TD pass from Drew Allar, Ryan Barker kick, 10:08 (PSU 7–0)
- PSU – Tyler Warren, 15-yard TD pass from Allar, Barker kick, 2:31 (PSU 14–0)

Second quarter

- PU – Ben Freehill, 22-yard field goal, 8:47 (PSU 14–3)
- PSU – Nicholas Singleton, 10-yard TD run, Barker kick, 6:04 (PSU 21–3)

Third quarter

- PSU – Warren, 48-yard TD run, Barker kick, 11:26 (PSU 28–3)
- PSU – Harrison Wallace III, 46-yard TD pass from Allar, Barker kick, 4:42 (PSU 35–3)
- PSU – Beau Pribula, 49-yard TD run, Barker kick, 0:32 (PSU 42–3)

Fourth quarter

- PU – Max Klare, 20-yard TD pass from Ryan Browne, Freehill kick, 9:50 (PSU 42–10)
- PSU – Luke Reynolds, 24-yard TD pass from Pribula, Barker kick, 1:51 (PSU 49–10)

Statistics	PSU	PUR
First downs	23	16
Plays–yards	61–539	59–302
Rushes–yards	34–234	28–85
Passing yards	305	217
Passing: comp–att–int	22–27–0	15–31–0
Time of possession	31:20	28:40

Team	Category	Player	Statistics
Penn State	Passing	Drew Allar	17/19, 247 yards, 3 TD
Penn State	Rushing	Tyler Warren	3 carries, 63 yards, TD
Penn State	Receiving	Tyler Warren	8 receptions, 127 yards, TD
Purdue	Passing	Hudson Card	11/20, 151 yards
Purdue	Rushing	Devin Mockobee	11 carries, 40 yards
Purdue	Receiving	Max Klare	7 receptions, 91 yards, TD

=== at Michigan State ===
Purdue Boilermakers at Michigan State Spartans – Game summary

Quarter	1	2	3	4	Total
Boilermakers	3	0	7	7	17
Spartans	7	17	0	0	24

at Spartan Stadium, East Lansing, Michigan

- Date: November 22
- Game time: 8:00 p.m. EST
- Game weather: Cloudy • Temperature: 43 °F (6 °C) • Wind: NW 15 miles per hour (24 km/h)
- Game attendance: 57,558
- Referee: Kole Knueppel
- TV announcers (FOX): Connor Onion (play-by-play) and Mark Helfrich (analyst)

Game information

First quarter

- (9:17) PUR – Ben Freehill 40-yard field goal (Drive: 11 plays, 53 yards, 5:43; Purdue 3–0)
- (4:24) MSU – Montorie Foster Jr. 7-yard pass from Aidan Chiles, Jonathan Kim kick (Drive: 11 plays, 75 yards, 4:53; Michigan State 7–3)

Second quarter

- (12:07) MSU – Jonathan Kim 43-yard field goal (Drive: 11 plays, 47 yards, 5:45; Michigan State 10–3)
- (7:45) MSU – Nate Carter 2-yard run, Jonathan Kim kick (Drive: 8 plays, 33 yards, 3:45; Michigan State 17–3)
- (0:41) MSU – Nate Carter 20-yard pass from Aidan Chiles, Jonathan Kim kick (Drive: 10 plays, 84 yards, 1:55; Michigan State 24–3)

Third quarter

- (5:49) PUR – Devin Mockobee 2-yard run, Ben Freehill kick (Drive: 10 plays, 73 yards, 5:24; Michigan State 24–10)

Fourth quarter

- (13:54) PUR – Max Klare 7-yard pass from Hudson Card, Ben Freehill kick (Drive: 10 plays, 85 yards, 3:40; Michigan State 24–17)

Statistics	PUR	MSU
First downs	19	22
Plays–yards	66–338	69–293
Rushes–yards	19–-4	38–134
Passing yards	342	159
Passing: comp–att–int	26–47–1	15–31–0
Time of possession	27:41	32:19

Team	Category	Player	Statistics
Purdue	Passing	Hudson Card	26/47, 342 yards, TD, INT
Purdue	Rushing	Devin Mockobee	9 carries, 14 yards, TD
Purdue	Receiving	Jahmal Edrine	5 receptions, 87 yards
Michigan State	Passing	Aidan Chiles	15/31, 159 yards, 2 TD
Michigan State	Rushing	Kay'Ron Lynch-Adams	18 carries, 85 yards
Michigan State	Receiving	Montorie Foster Jr.	4 receptions, 59 yards, TD

=== at No. 10 Indiana (Old Oaken Bucket) ===
Purdue Boilermakers at No. 10 Indiana Hoosiers – Game summary

Quarter	1	2	3	4	Total
Boilermakers	0	0	0	0	0
No. 10 Indiana	7	21	17	21	66

at Memorial Stadium, Bloomington, Indiana

- Date: November 30
- Game time: 7:00 p.m. EST
- Game weather: 28 °F (−2 °C), snow
- Game attendance: 53,082
- Referee: Jeffrey Servinski
- TV announcers (FS1): Tim Brando (play-by-play), Devin Gardner (analyst), and Josh Sims (sideline reporter)

Game information

First quarter

- (6:25) IU – Justice Ellison 2-yard run, Nicolas Radicic kick (Drive: 9 plays, 86 yards, 3:52; Indiana 7–0)

Second quarter

- (11:31) IU – Ke'Shawn Williams 14-yard pass from Kurtis Rourke, Nicolas Radicic kick (Drive: 9 plays, 71 yards, 4:13; Indiana 14–0)
- (6:59) IU – Elijah Sarratt 84-yard pass from Kurtis Rourke, Nicolas Radicic kick (Drive: 4 plays, 99 yards, 2:01; Indiana 21–0)
- (2:52) IU – Ty Son Lawton 4-yard run, Nicolas Radicic kick (Drive: 7 plays, 70 yards, 3:15; Indiana 28–0)

Third quarter

- (12:12) IU – Nicolas Radicic 26-yard field goal (Drive: 7 plays, 11 yards, 2:37; Indiana 31–0)
- (7:51) IU – Elijah Sarratt 24-yard pass from Kurtis Rourke, Nicolas Radicic kick (Drive: 4 plays, 42 yards, 1:57; Indiana 38–0)
- (1:31) IU – Zach Horton 5-yard pass from Kurtis Rourke, Nicolas Radicic kick (Drive: 8 plays, 48 yards, 4:03; Indiana 45–0)

Fourth quarter

- (12:47) IU – Miles Cross 34-yard pass from Kurtis Rourke, Nicolas Radicic kick (Drive: 7 plays, 76 yards, 2:27; Indiana 52–0)
- (12:01) IU – Omar Cooper Jr. 17-yard pass from Kurtis Rourke, Nicolas Radicic kick (Drive: 1 plays, 17 yards, 0:05; Indiana 59–0)
- (1:48) IU – Tayven Jackson 4-yard run, Nicolas Radicic kick (Drive: 4 plays, 35 yards, 1:33; Indiana 66–0)

Statistics	PUR	IU
First downs	5	30
Plays–yards	45-67	75-582
Rushes–yards	24-13	44-233
Passing yards	54	349
Passing: comp–att–int	9-21-2	23-31-0
Time of possession	23:23	36:37

Team	Category	Player	Statistics
Purdue	Passing	Hudson Card	6/13, 35 yds, INT
Purdue	Rushing	Devin Mockobee	14 Carries, 21 yds
Purdue	Receiving	Max Klare	5 Receptions, 36 yds
Indiana	Passing	Kurtis Rourke	23/31, 349 yds, 6 TDs
Indiana	Rushing	Justice Ellison	11 Carries, 63 yds, TD
Indiana	Receiving	Elijah Sarratt	8 receptions, 165 yds, 2 TDs

== Roster ==
2024 Purdue Boilermakers football team roster
Players
Coaches
Offense

Pos.	#	Name	Class
WR	0	Jayden Dixon-Veal	Sr
QB	1	Hudson Card	Sr
WR	2	Luke Jones	Fr
RB	3	Jaheim Merriweather	Fr
WR	4	Kam Brown	Sr
QB	5	Marcos Davila	Fr
WR	6	Arhmad Branch	Fr
WR	7	Jahmal Edrine	Jr
WR	8	De'Nylon Morrissette	So
WR	9	C. J. Smith	So
WR	10	Jesse Watson	Fr
WR	11	Tra'Mar Harris	Fr
WR	12	Leland Smith	So
WR	13	Jaron Tibbs	So
QB	14	Jake Wilson	Fr
QB	15	Ryan Browne	Fr
WR	16	Shamar Rigby	Fr
QB	17	Christian Gelov	Sr
QB	18	Bennett Meredith	So
TE	19	Tayvion Galloway	Fr
QB	20	Carson Kitchel	Fr
RB	23	Reggie Love III	Sr
WR	26	Andrew Sowinski	Sr
RB	28	Addai Lewellen	Jr
RB	33	Elijah Jackson	Fr
RB	37	Antonio Harris	Fr
FB	41	Ben Furtney	Sr
RB	45	Devin Mockobee	Jr
OL	50	John Randle Jr.	Fr
OL	52	Rod Green	Jr
OL	53	Gus Hartwig	Sr
OL	54	Luke Griffin	Sr
OL	55	D. J. Wingfield	Sr
OL	57	Tom Ewing	Fr
OL	59	Thomas Tinsley	Fr
OL	61	Aaron Roberts	Jr
OL	63	Marcus Mbow	Jr
OL	65	Jordan King	Fr
OL	66	Anthony Boswell	Fr
OL	67	Drew Woodruff	So
OL	68	Jimmy Liston	Fr
OL	70	Max Parrott	Fr
OL	71	Corey Stewart	Sr
OL	72	Jaden Ball	Fr
OL	73	Jaekwon Bouldin (injured)	Jr
OL	74	Joshua Sales Jr.	Jr
OL	75	Jalen Grant	Sr
OL	76	Ethan Trent	Fr
OL	77	Mahamane Moussa	Jr
OL	78	Bakyne Coly	Jr
OL	79	Joey Tanona	So
WR	80	Ryne Shackelford	Fr
TE	81	George Burhenn	So
TE	82	Drew Biber	Jr
TE	83	Andrew Adkison	Fr
TE	84	Nolan Buckman	Fr
TE	86	Max Klare	So
WR	87	Adam Kidder	Fr
WR	88	Donovan Hamilton	Fr
TE	89	Luke Klare	Fr
TE	90	James Hardy	Fr

Defense

Pos.	#	Name	Class
DL	0	Jeffrey M'Ba	Sr
DB	1	Markevious Brown (injured)	Sr
DB	2	Nyland Green	Jr
DB	3	Derrick Rogers Jr.	So
LB	4	Kydran Jenkins	Sr
DB	5	Luke Williams	Fr
DB	6	Smiley Bradford	Fr
DB	7	Salem Turner-Muhammad	Sr
DE	8	C. J. Madden (injured)	So
DL	9	Joe Strickland	So
DB	10	Kyndrich Breedlove	Jr
DB	11	Antonio Stevens	Sr
DB	12	Tarrion Grant	Fr
DB	13	Koy Beasley	Fr
LB	14	Yanni Karlaftis	Jr
DE	15	Will Heldt	So
DB	16	Hudauri Hines	Fr
DE	17	Shitta Sillah	Sr
DL	18	Demeco Kennedy	Fr
DB	19	Botros Alisandro	Jr
LB	20	Winston Berglund (injured)	Fr
DB	21	D'Mon Marable	Fr
LB	22	Owen Davis	Fr
DE	23	Trey Smith	Fr
DB	24	Anthony Brown	So
DB	25	Ty Hudkins	Fr
DB	27	Zeke Williams	So
DB	29	Earl Kulp	Fr
DB	31	Dillon Thieneman	So
DB	32	Joseph Jefferson II	So
DL	34	Damarjhe Lewis	Jr
LB	37	Joey Sumlin	Fr
DB	38	Luke Pettaway	Fr
LB	40	Hudson Miller	So
LB	42	Cooper Kitchel	Fr
DB	43	Landon Heard	Fr
DB	44	Ayden Murray	Fr
DB	46	Sterling Smith	So
DE	47	Jamari Payne	Fr
DB	49	Isaiah Needam	Fr
LB	51	Landon Drennan	Fr
DL	55	Jamarius Dinkins	Jr
DL	56	Reese Hill	Fr
DL	85	Caleb Irving	Fr
DL	91	Cole Brevard	Sr
DL	92	Mo Omonode	Jr
DE	93	Albert Schwartz	Fr
DL	94	Elijah Taylor	Fr
DL	95	Joe Anderson	Sr
DE	96	Logan Jellison	Fr
DL	97	Jamarrion Harkless	Fr
DL	98	Drake Carlson	Fr
DE	99	Jireh Ojata	Sr

Special teams

Pos.	#	Name	Class
P	30	Keelan Crimmins	Jr
K	35	Spencer Porath	Fr
K	36	R. J. Lopez	Sr
K	39	Ben Freehill	Sr
LS	43	Claude Strnad	Fr
LS	44	Nick Levy	Jr
P	48	Bennett Boehnlein	So

Head coach

- Ryan Walters

Coordinators/assistant coaches

- Cory Patterson – Associate head coach/wide receivers
- Kevin Kane – Defensive coordinator
- Chris Petrilli – Special teams coordinator
- Sam Carter – Cornerbacks
- Lamar Conard – Running backs
- Joe Dineen – Defensive ends
- Brick Haley – Defensive linemen
- Marcus Johnson – Offensive linemen
- Grant O'Brien – Safeties
- Justin Sinz – Tight ends
- Kiero Small – Director, strength and conditioning
- Cameron Colbert – Assistant director, strength and conditioning
- Myles Quimby – Assistant director, strength and conditioning
- Nate Rock – Assistant director, strength and conditioning
- Greg Robinson – Assistant director, strength and conditioning
- Stanton Keane – Senior offensive analyst
- Preston Gordon – Senior defensive analyst
- Angel Matute – Offensive analyst
- Durron Neal – Offensive analyst
- Jason Simmons – Offensive analyst
- Andy Buh – Defensive analyst
- T. J. McCollum – Defensive analyst
- Jeff Smart – Defensive analyst
- Courtney Arnick – Graduate assistant
- Austin Karr – Graduate assistant
- Keith Towbridge – Graduate assistant

Legend

- (C) Team captain
- (S) Suspended
- (I) Ineligible
- Injured
- Redshirt

Roster
Last update: 10/5/24
