= 2023 Purdue Boilermakers football team =

American college football season

2023 Purdue Boilermakers football
- Conference: Big Ten Conference
- West Division
- Record: 4–8 (3–6 Big Ten)
- Head coach: Ryan Walters (1st season)
- Offensive coordinator: Graham Harrell (1st season)
- Offensive scheme: Air raid
- Defensive coordinator: Kevin Kane (1st season)
- Base defense: Air strike
- Home stadium: Ross–Ade Stadium

2023 Big Ten Conference football standings
	Conf.			Overall
Team	W		L	W		L
East Division
No. 1 Michigan xy$#^	9	–	0	15	–	0
No. 10 Ohio State	8	–	1	11	–	2
No. 13 Penn State	7	–	2	10	–	3
Maryland	4	–	5	8	–	5
Rutgers	3	–	6	7	–	6
Indiana	1	–	8	3	–	9
Michigan State†	0	–	7	0	–	8
West Division
No. 24 Iowa xy	7	–	2	10	–	4
Northwestern	5	–	4	8	–	5
Wisconsin	5	–	4	7	–	6
Minnesota	3	–	6	6	–	7
Illinois	3	–	6	5	–	7
Nebraska	3	–	6	5	–	7
Purdue	3	–	6	4	–	8
Championship: Michigan 26, Iowa 0
# – College Football Playoff champion; ^ – College Football Playoff participant; $ – Conference champion; x – Division champion/co-champions; y – Championship game participant; † — NCAA vacated all wins for Michigan State (4–8, 2–7); Rankings from AP Poll

The 2023 Purdue Boilermakers football team represented Purdue University in the West Division of the Big Ten Conference during the 2023 NCAA Division I FBS football season. Led by first-year head coach Ryan Walters, the Boilermakers compiled an overall record of 4–8 with a mark of 3–6 in conference play, placing in four-way tie for fourth place in the Big Ten's West Division. Purdue played home games at Ross–Ade Stadium in West Lafayette, Indiana.

== Offseason ==
=== Coaching staff changes ===
==== Coaching staff departures ====
Name	Position	Following Team	Following Position
Jeff Brohm	Head coach	Louisville	Head coach
Brian Brohm	Offensive coordinator/quarterbacks	Louisville	Offensive coordinator/quarterbacks
Ron English	Co-defensive coordinator/secondary	Louisville	Defensive coordinator
Mark Hagen	Co-defensive coordinator/defensive line	Louisville	Co-defensive coordinator/defensive line
Chris Barclay	Running backs	Louisville	Running backs
David Elson	Linebackers	Wake Forest	Defensive analyst
Karl Maslowski	Special teams/assistant linebackers	Louisville	Special teams/assistant linebackers
Garrick McGee	Wide receivers	Louisville	Wide receivers
Dale Williams	Offensive line/tight ends	Louisville	Offensive quality control
Ryan Wallace	Tight ends/assistant offensive line	Louisville	Tight ends/special teams
Ashton Youboty	Cornerbacks		

==== Coaching staff additions ====
Name	Position	Previous Team	Previous Position
Ryan Walters	Head coach	Illinois	Defensive coordinator
Graham Harrell	Offensive coordinator	West Virginia	Offensive coordinator/quarterbacks
Kevin Kane	Defensive coordinator	Illinois	Outside linebackers / Associate HC
Cory Patterson	Associate head coach/wide receivers	Illinois	Running backs
Sam Carter	Cornerbacks	Ole Miss	Cornerbacks
Lamar Conard	Running backs	Miami (OH)	Running backs
Joe Dineen	Outside linebackers	Illinois	Outside linebackers
Seth Doege	Tight ends	Ole Miss	Analyst
Brick Haley	Defensive line	Minnesota	Defensive line
Marcus Johnson	Offensive line	Missouri	Offensive line/run game coordinator/assistant head coach
Grant O'Brien	Safeties	Illinois	Safeties
Kiero Small	Director of strength and conditioning	Michigan	Assistant strength and conditioning

=== Transfers ===
==== Transfers out ====
The Boilermakers lost twelve players to the transfer portal.

Name	Number	Pos.	Height	Weight	Year	Hometown	Transfer to
Spencer Holstege	#75	LB	6'5	275	Graduate	Grand Rapids, Michigan	UCLA
Kobe Lewis	#25	RB	5'9	175	(redshirt) Junior	Americus, Georgia	Florida Atlantic
Lawrence Johnson	#90	LB	6'4	285	Senior	Fort Wayne, Indiana	Auburn
Branson Deen	#58	LB	6'3	255	Senior	Indianapolis, Indiana	Miami (FL)
Jack Sullivan	#99	DE	6'5	275	Senior	Plainfield, Illinois	USC
Chris Van Eekeren	#57	K	5'11	195	(redshirt) Junior	Chesterton, Indiana	Temple
Greg Hudgins	#98	DT	6'4	230	(redshirt) Sophomore	Washington D.C.	Charlotte
Eric Miller	#74	OT	6'7	305	Senior	Mason, Ohio	Louisville
Terence Thomas	-	S	5'11	185	(redshirt) Freshman	Youngstown, Ohio	Akron
Brady Allen	#18	QB	6'5	210	Sophomore	Fort Branch, Indiana	Louisville
Tristan Cox	#48	LB	6'3	235	Junior	Somerset, Kentucky	Ohio
Jordan Buchanan	#19	CB	6'0	165	Sophomore	Suwanee, Georgia	South Alabama
Jamari Brown	#7	CB	6'3	205	Senior	Pompano Beach, Florida	Mississippi State

==== Transfers in ====
The Boilermakers added fourteen players via transfer.

Name	Number	Pos.	Height	Weight	Year	Hometown	Transfer from
Salim Turner-Muhammad	#2	CB	6'0	170	Senior	Alexandria, Virginia	Stanford
Hudson Card	#1	QB	6'2	195	Junior	Austin, Texas	Texas
Isaiah Nichols	#90	DL	6'3	300	Junior	Springdale, Arkansas	Arkansas
Jalen Grant	#75	IOL	6'3	297	Senior	Chicago, Illinois	Bowling Green
Ben Farrell	#64	OT	6'4	299	Senior	Grand Rapids, Michigan	Indiana Wesleyan
Anthony Brown	#24	S	6'0	185	(redshirt) Freshman	Milan, Tennessee	Arkansas
Jeffrey M'Ba	#0	DL	6'6	305	Junior	Libreville, Gabon	Auburn
Malik Langham	#35	DL	6'6	269	Senior	Huntsville, AL	Vanderbilt
Marquis Wilson	#16	CB	5'11	180	Senior	Windsor, CT	Penn State
Braxton Myers	#12	CB	6'1	188	Freshman	Coppell, TX	Ole Miss
Bennett Meredith	#18	QB	6'3	190	Freshman	Birmingham, AL	Arizona State
Luke Griffin	#74	OT	6'5	275	Senior	Chatsworth, Georgia	Missouri
Jahmal Edrine	#7	WR	6'3	210	Junior	Fort Lauderdale, Florida	Florida Atlantic
Markevious Brown	#1	CB	6'0	170	Sophomore	Bradenton, Florida	Ole Miss
Austin Johnson	#58	OL	6'4	305	Junior	Highlands Ranch, Colorado	Colorado

=== Players drafted into the NFL ===
Round	Pick	NFL team	Player	Position
4	131	Cincinnati Bengals	Charlie Jones	WR
4	135	Las Vegas Raiders	Aidan O'Connell	QB
5	171	Tampa Bay Buccaneers	Payne Durham	TE
7	241	Pittsburgh Steelers	Cory Trice	CB
7	255	San Francisco 49ers	Jalen Graham	OLB

== Preseason ==
=== Recruits ===
The Boilermakers signed a total of 17 recruits.

College recruiting (2023)
Name	Hometown	School	Height	Weight	Commit date
Winston Berglund; DB	Carmel, IN	Carmel High School	6 ft 2 in (1.88 m)	208 lb (94 kg)	Apr 15, 2022
Winston Berglund; DB	Recruit ratings: Rivals: 247Sports: ESPN:				
Owen Davis; LB	Richwood, OH	North Union High School	6 ft 3 in (1.91 m)	210 lb (95 kg)	Jun 5, 2022
Owen Davis; LB	Recruit ratings: Rivals: 247Sports: ESPN:				
Drake Carlson; DT	Nashville, TN	Father Ryan High School	6 ft 4 in (1.93 m)	272 lb (123 kg)	Jun 13, 2022
Drake Carlson; DT	Recruit ratings: Rivals: 247Sports: ESPN:				
Zion Gunn; CB	Winter Park, FL	Winter Park High School	6 ft 2 in (1.88 m)	180 lb (82 kg)	Jun 13, 2022
Zion Gunn; CB	Recruit ratings: Rivals: 247Sports: ESPN:				
Ryan Browne; QB	New Berlin, NY	Milford Academy	6 ft 4 in (1.93 m)	195 lb (88 kg)	Oct 7, 2022
Ryan Browne; QB	Recruit ratings: Rivals: 247Sports: ESPN:				
Ethon Cole; S	Minneola, FL	Lake Minneola High School	6 ft 2 in (1.88 m)	190 lb (86 kg)	Jul 2, 2022
Ethon Cole; S	Recruit ratings: Rivals: 247Sports: ESPN:				
Dillon Thieneman; S	Westfield, IN	Westfield High School	6 ft 0 in (1.83 m)	190 lb (86 kg)	Jun 14, 2022
Dillon Thieneman; S	Recruit ratings: Rivals: 247Sports: ESPN:				
Jamarrion Harkless; DL	Lexington, KY	Frederick Douglass High School	6 ft 4 in (1.93 m)	320 lb (150 kg)	Dec 21, 2022
Jamarrion Harkless; DL	Recruit ratings: Rivals: 247Sports: ESPN:				
Will Heldt; LB	Carmel, IN	Carmel High School	6 ft 6 in (1.98 m)	240 lb (110 kg)	Jun 25, 2022
Will Heldt; LB	Recruit ratings: Rivals: 247Sports: ESPN:				
Ryne Shackelford	LaGrange, OH	Keystone High School	5 ft 11 in (1.80 m)	168 lb (76 kg)	Jun 27, 2022
Ryne Shackelford	Recruit ratings: Rivals: 247Sports: ESPN:				
Jaron Tibbs; WR	Indianapolis, IN	Cathedral High School	6 ft 4 in (1.93 m)	193 lb (88 kg)	Jun 28, 2022
Jaron Tibbs; WR	Recruit ratings: Rivals: 247Sports: ESPN:				
George Burhenn; TE	Fortville, IN	Cathedral High School	6 ft 5 in (1.96 m)	215 lb (98 kg)	Jul 1, 2022
George Burhenn; TE	Recruit ratings: Rivals: 247Sports: ESPN:				
Issiah Walker; OL	El Dorado, KS	Butler Community College	6 ft 4 in (1.93 m)	302 lb (137 kg)	Jan 24, 2023
Issiah Walker; OL	Recruit ratings: Rivals: 247Sports: ESPN:				
Derrick Rogers; WR	Orlando, FL	Jones High School	6 ft 1 in (1.85 m)	170 lb (77 kg)	Jan 29, 2023
Derrick Rogers; WR	Recruit ratings: Rivals: 247Sports: ESPN:				
Arhmad Branch; WR	Festus, MO	Festus High School	6 ft 1 in (1.85 m)	175 lb (79 kg)	Jan 29, 2023
Arhmad Branch; WR	Recruit ratings: Rivals: 247Sports: ESPN:				
Jimmy Liston; OC	Hinsdale, IL	Fenwick High School	6 ft 3 in (1.91 m)	310 lb (140 kg)	Aug 31, 2021
Jimmy Liston; OC	Recruit ratings: 247Sports: ESPN:				
Mondrell Dean; DE	Hurricane, WV	Hurricane High School	6 ft 3 in (1.91 m)	240 lb (110 kg)	Jan 31, 2023
Mondrell Dean; DE	Recruit ratings: Rivals: 247Sports: ESPN:				
Overall recruit ranking: Rivals: 66 247Sports: 64
Note: In many cases, Scout, Rivals, 247Sports, On3, and ESPN may conflict in their listings of height and weight.; In these cases, the average was taken. ESPN grades are on a 100-point scale.; Sources: "Purdue Football Commitments". Rivals.; "ESPN". ESPN.; "2023 Team Ranking". Rivals.com.

== Schedule ==
Date	Time	Opponent	Site	TV	Result	Attendance	Source
September 2	12:00 p.m.	Fresno State*	Ross–Ade Stadium; West Lafayette, IN	BTN	L 35–39	54,898	
September 9	12:00 p.m.	at Virginia Tech*	Lane Stadium; Blacksburg, VA	ESPN2	W 24–17	65,632	
September 16	7:30 p.m.	Syracuse*	Ross–Ade Stadium; West Lafayette, IN	NBC	L 20–35	61,441	
September 22	7:00 p.m.	Wisconsin	Ross–Ade Stadium; West Lafayette, IN	FS1	L 17–38	55,529	
September 30	3:30 p.m.	Illinois^{†}	Ross–Ade Stadium; West Lafayette, IN (rivalry)	Peacock	W 44–19	59,510	
October 7	3:30 p.m.	at Iowa	Kinnick Stadium; Iowa City, IA	Peacock	L 14–20	69,250	
October 14	12:00 p.m.	No. 3 Ohio State	Ross–Ade Stadium; West Lafayette, IN	Peacock	L 7–41	57,319	
October 28	3:30 p.m.	at Nebraska	Memorial Stadium; Lincoln, NE	FS1 (Note: 1st half moved to FS2 to accommodate the conclusion of Oklahoma-Kansas, which originally aired on FOX)	L 14–31	86,709	
November 4	7:30 p.m.	at No. 3 Michigan	Michigan Stadium; Ann Arbor, MI	NBC	L 13–41	110,245	
November 11	3:30 p.m.	Minnesota	Ross–Ade Stadium; West Lafayette, IN	NBC	W 49–30	59,049	
November 18	12:00 p.m.	at Northwestern	Ryan Field; Evanston, IL	BTN	L 15–23	23,291	
November 25	12:00 p.m.	Indiana	Ross–Ade Stadium; West Lafayette, IN (Old Oaken Bucket)	BTN	W 35–31	59,993	
*Non-conference game; ^{†}Homecoming; Rankings from AP Poll (and CFP Rankings, from the date when issued) - Released prior to game; All times are in Eastern time; Source:

== Roster ==
2023 Purdue Boilermakers football team roster
Players
Coaches
Offense

Pos.	#	Name	Class
WR	0	Jayden Dixon-Veal	Jr
QB	1	Hudson Card	RJr
WR	2	Abdur-Rahmaan Yaseen (injured)	RJr
WR	3	Tyrone Tracy	RSr
WR	4	Deion Burks	RSo
WR	5	Elijah Canion	RJr
WR	6	Curtis Deville, Jr.	RFr
WR	7	Jahmal Edrine (injured)	RSo
WR	8	TJ Sheffield	RSr
WR	9	Mershawn Rice (injured)	RSr
WR	12	Zion Steptoe	RFr
WR	13	Jaron Tibbs	Fr
QB	14	Jake Wilson	Fr
QB	15	Ryan Browne	Fr
QB	17	Christian Gelov	RJr
WR	17	Arhmad Branch	Fr
QB	18	Bennett Meredith	RFr
QB	19	Kyle Adams	RJr
RB	20	Bishop Johnson	RSo
RB	22	Dylan Downing	Sr
RB	23	Mondrell Dean	Fr
WR	26	Andrew Sowinski	RJr
WR	27	Trey Firestone	RFr
RB	28	Addai Lewellen	RFr
RB	29	Christian Womack	Fr
RB	33	Elijah Jackson	Fr
WR	34	Ben Van Noord	RSo
WR	35	Hayden Parise	RJr
TE	41	Ben Furtney	RJr
RB	45	Devin Mockobee	RSo
OL	52	Preston Nichols	RSr
OL	53	Gus Hartwig	Sr
OL	54	Josh Kaltenberger	RJr
OL	55	Malachi Preciado	RFr
OL	57	Tom Ewing	Fr
OL	58	Austin Johnson	RJr
OL	59	Vince Carpenter	RFr
OL	61	Aaron Roberts	RSo
OL	62	Ben Kuhns	RSr
OL	63	Marcus Mbow (injured)	RSo
OL	64	Ben Farrell	RSr
OL	67	Drew Woodruff	RFr
OL	68	Jimmy Liston	Fr
OL	72	Andre Oben	RFr
OL	73	Daniel Johnson	RSr
OL	74	Luke Griffin	RSr
OL	75	Jalen Grant	Sr
OL	76	Ethan Trent	Fr
OL	77	Mahamane Moussa	RSo
OL	78	Bakyne Coly	So
WR	80	Ryne Shackelford	Fr
TE	81	George Burhenn	Fr
TE	82	Drew Biber	RSo
WR	83	Andrew Adkison	Fr
WR	84	Nolan Buckman	Fr
WR	85	Luke Jones	Fr
TE	86	Max Klare (injured)	RFr
WR	87	Maddix Bogunia-Bright	Fr
TE	88	Garrett Miller	RSr
TE	89	Paul Piferi (injured)	RSr
TE	91	Ben Buechel	RJr

Defense

Pos.	#	Name	Class
DL	0	Jeffrey M'Ba	Jr
CB	1	Markevious Brown	Jr
DB	2	Salim Turner-Muhammad (injured)	RSr
LB	4	Kydran Jenkins	Sr
DE	5	Nic Scourton	So
LB	8	OC Brothers	RSr
DE	9	Joe Strickland	RFr
S	10	Cam Allen	Sr
DB	11	Antonio Stevens	RJr
DB	12	Braxton Myers	RFr
DB	13	Derrick Rogers Jr.	Fr
LB, DE	14	Yanni Karlaftis	RSo
LB	15	Will Heldt	Fr
CB	16	Marquis Wilson (injured)	RSr
DB	19	Botros Alisandro	So
LB	20	Winston Berglund	Fr
S	21	Sanoussi Kane	Sr
LB	22	Owen Davis	Fr
DB	23	Ethon Cole	Fr
DB	24	Anthony Brown	RFr
DB	25	Zion Gunn	Fr
CB	27	Zeke Williams	RFr
DB	29	Jaxon Mull	RFr
DB	31	Dillon Thieneman	Fr
S	32	Joseph Jefferson II	RFr
DT	34	Damarjhe Lewis (injured)	RJr
DL	35	Malik Langham	RSr
LB	36	Roman Pitre	So
LB	37	Joey Sumlin	Fr
DB	38	Luke Pettaway	Fr
LB	40	Hudson Miller	RFr
LB	42	Clyde Washington	Sr
DB	43	Landon Heard	Fr
LB	46	Scotty Humpich	RSr
LB	47	Domanick Moon	RFr
LB	49	Farrell Henderson III	RFr
DE	50	Sulaiman Kpaka	RSr
DE	56	Jayden Scruggs	RFr
DT	91	Cole Brevard	RJr
DT	92	Mo Omonode	So
DE	93	Isaiah Nichols	GS
DT	94	J.P. Deeter	RFr
DE	95	Joe Anderson	RSr
DE	96	Khordae Sydnor	RSo
DT	97	Jamarrion Harkless	Fr
DL	98	Drake Carlson	Fr
DT	99	Prince James Boyd Jr.	RSr

Special teams

Pos.	#	Name	Class
K	25	Iain Ramage	Fr
P	30	Jack Ansell	Jr
K	39	Ben Freehill	RSr
K	41	Caleb Krockover	RJr
LS	44	Daniel Hawthorne	Sr
K	45	Julio Macias (injured)	RFr
P	47	Brendan Cropsey	RJr
P	48	Bennett Boehnlein	RFr
LS	51	Nick Taylor	RJr

Head coach

- Ryan Walters

Coordinators/assistant coaches

- Cory Patterson (associate head coach/wide receivers)
- Graham Harrell (offensive coordinator)
- Kevin Kane (defensive coordinator)
- Sam Carter (cornerbacks)
- Lamar Conard (running backs)
- Joe Dineen (outside linebackers)
- Seth Doege (tight ends)
- Brick Haley (defensive line)
- Marcus Johnson (offensive line)
- Grant O'Brien (safeties)
- Kiero Small (director of strength and conditioning)

Legend

- (C) Team captain
- (S) Suspended
- (I) Ineligible
- Injured
- Redshirt

Roster
Last update: November 13, 2023

== Game summaries ==
=== Fresno State ===
Game One – Fresno State Bulldogs (0–0) at Purdue Boilermakers (0–0)

Quarter	1	2	3	4	Total
Bulldogs	7	10	8	14	39
Boilermakers	7	14	7	7	35

at Ross-Ade Stadium • West Lafayette, Indiana

- Date: Saturday, September 2, 2023
- Game time: 12:00 p.m. EDT
- Game weather: Sunny • Temperature: 79 °F (26 °C) • Wind: SW 6 mph
- Game attendance: 54,898
- Referee: Ron Snodgrass
- TV announcers (BTN): Cory Provus (play-by-play) & Jake Butt (analyst) & Brooke Fletcher (sideline)
- Recap, Box score

Game information

First quarter

- (11:40) PUR – Deion Burks 84-yard pass from Hudson Card, Ben Freehill kick (Drive: 3 plays, 92 yards, 1:15; Purdue 7–0)
- (7:26) FRES – Erik Brooks 29-yard pass from Mikey Keene, Dylan Lynch kick (Drive: 6 plays, 55 yards, 2:22; Tied 7–7)

Second quarter

- (14:57) PUR – Tyrone Tracy Jr. 1-yard run, Ben Freehill kick (Drive: 8 plays, 17 yards, 4:01; Purdue 14–7)
- (12:29) FRES – Jalen Moss 8-yard pass from Mikey Keene, Dylan Lynch kick (Drive: 6 plays, 60 yards, 2:28; Tied 14–14)
- (9:05) PUR – Deion Burks 17-yard pass from Hudson Card, Ben Freehill kick (Drive: 6 plays, 59 yards, 3:20; Purdue 21–14)
- (0:00) FRES – Dylan Lynch 52-yard field goal (Drive: 4 plays, 20 yards, 0:22; Purdue 21–17)

Third quarter

- (14:49) PUR – Tyrone Tracy Jr. 98-yard kickoff return, Ben Freehill kick (Purdue 28–17)
- (6:44) FRES – Jaelen Gill 18-yard pass from Mikey Keene, Jalen Moss–Mikey Keene pass (Drive: 9 plays, 74 yards, 3:59; Purdue 28–25)

Fourth quarter

- (13:44) FRES – Malik Sherrod 1-yard run, Dylan Lynch kick (Drive: 14 plays, 85 yards, 5:44; Fresno State 32–28)
- (4:36) PUR – Devin Mockobee 11-yard run, Ben Freehill kick (Drive: 2 plays, 55 yards, 0:41; Purdue 35–32)
- (0:59) FRES – Erik Brooks 22-yard pass from Mikey Keene, Dylan Lynch kick (Drive: 9 plays, 79 yards, 3:31; Fresno State 39–35)

Statistics	FRES	PUR
First downs	27	19
Plays–yards	81–487	61–363
Rushes–yards	37–116	30–109
Passing yards	371	254
Passing: comp–att–int	32–45–1	17–30–0
Turnovers		
Time of possession	36:33	23:27

Team	Category	Player	Statistics
Fresno State	Passing	Mikey Keene	31/44, 365 yards, 4 TD, INT
Fresno State	Rushing	Elijah Gilliam	20 carries, 93 yards
Fresno State	Receiving	Erik Brooks	9 receptions, 170 yards, 2 TD
Purdue	Passing	Hudson Card	17/30, 254 yards, 2 TD
Purdue	Rushing	Devin Mockobee	16 carries, 60 yards, TD
Purdue	Receiving	Deion Burks	4 receptions, 152 yards, 2 TD

=== Virginia Tech ===
Game Two – Purdue Boilermakers (0–1) at Virginia Tech Hokies (1–0)

Quarter	1	2	3	4	Total
Boilermakers	7	10	0	7	24
Hokies	0	17	0	0	17

at Lane Stadium • Blacksburg, Virginia

- Date: Saturday, September 9, 2023
- Game time: 12:00 p.m. EDT
- Game weather: Rain • Temperature: 72 °F (22 °C) • Wind: NE 5 mph
- Game attendance: 65,632
- Referee: Riley Johnson
- TV announcers (ESPN2): Brian Custer (play-by-play) & Rod Gilmore (analyst) & Lauren Sisler (sideline)
- Recap, Box score

Game information

First quarter

- (11:26) PUR – Devin Mockobee 15-yard run, Ben Freehill kick (Drive: 9 plays, 75 yards, 3:34; Purdue 7–0)

Second quarter

- (13:03) PUR – Ben Freehill 43-yard field goal (Drive: 10 plays, 42 yards, 04:11; Purdue 10–0)
- (12:39) PUR – Tyrone Tracy Jr. 21-yard run, Ben Freehill kick (Drive: 2 plays, 21 yards, 00:12; Purdue 17–0)
- (5:54) VT – Bhayshul Tuten 30-yard pass from Grant Wells, John Love kick (Drive: 7 plays, 67 yards, 02:37; Purdue 17–7)
- (2:51) VT – John Love 41-yard field goal (Drive: 5 plays, 10 yards, 01:27; Purdue 17–10)
- (0:10) VT – Jaylin Lane 2-yard pass from Grant Wells, John Love kick (Drive: 8 plays, 70 yards, 01:09; Tied 17–17)

Fourth quarter

- (8:00) PUR – Hudson Card 2-yard run, Ben Freehill kick, (Drive: 13 plays, 74 yards, 06:31; Purdue 24–17)

Statistics	PUR	VT
First downs	22	19
Plays–yards	80–427	62–286
Rushes–yards	46–179	22–11
Passing yards	248	275
Passing: comp–att–int	23–34–0	18–40–2
Turnovers		
Time of possession	38:01	21:59

Team	Category	Player	Statistics
Purdue	Passing	Hudson Card	23/34, 248 yards
Purdue	Rushing	Devin Mockobee	21 carries, 95 yards, 1 TD
Purdue	Receiving	Max Klare	8 receptions, 64 yards
Virginia Tech	Passing	Grant Wells	16/33, 243 yards, 2 TD, 2 INT
Virginia Tech	Rushing	Malachi Thomas	6 carries, 18 yards
Virginia Tech	Receiving	Dae'Quan Wright	4 receptions, 77 yards

=== Syracuse ===
Game Three – Purdue Boilermakers (1–1) at Syracuse Orange (2–0)

Quarter	1	2	3	4	Total
Orange	7	14	0	14	35
Boilermakers	0	7	7	6	20

at Ross–Ade Stadium • West Lafayette, Indiana

- Date: Saturday, September 16, 2023
- Game time: 7:30 p.m. EDT
- Game weather: Cloudy • Temperature: 71 °F (22 °C) • Wind: SE 6 mph
- Game attendance: 61,441
- Referee: Jeff Flanagan
- TV announcers (NBC): Noah Eagle (play-by-play), Todd Blackledge (analyst), and Kathryn Tappen (sideline reporter)
- Recap, Box score

Game information

First quarter

- (3:47) SYR – Garrett Shrader 3-yard run, Brady Denaburg kick (Drive: 11 plays, 94 yards, 03:50; Syracuse 7–0)

Second quarter

- (13:44) SYR – Garrett Shrader 35-yard run, Brady Denaburg kick (Drive: 6 plays, 64 yards, 01:47; Syracuse 14–0)
- (11:14) PUR – Deion Burks 2-yard pass from Hudson Card, Ben Freehill kick (Drive: 7 plays, 75 yards, 02:30; Syracuse 14–7)
- (2:34) SYR – LeQuint Allen 2-yard run, Brady Denaburg kick (Drive: 8 plays, 81 yards, 03:16; Syracuse 21–7)

Third quarter

- (4:28) PUR – Hudson Card 5-yard run, Ben Freehill kick (Drive: 10 plays, 66 yards, 05:02; Syracuse 21–14)

Fourth quarter

- (14:53) SYR – Garrett Shrader 1-yard run, Brady Denaburg kick (Drive: 10 plays, 75 yards, 04:35; Syracuse 28–14)
- (8:38) PUR – Tyrone Tracy Jr. 1-yard run (Drive: 14 plays, 75 yards, 06:15; Syracuse 28–20)
- (3:19) SYR – Garrett Shrader 28-yard run, Brady Denaburg kick (Drive: 3 plays, 39 yards, 01:37; Syracuse 35–20)

Statistics	SYR	PUR
First downs	28	29
Plays–yards	72–455	78–403
Rushes–yards	44–271	32–80
Passing yards	184	323
Passing: comp–att–int	14–28–1	32–46–1
Turnovers		
Time of possession	29:28	30:32

Team	Category	Player	Statistics
Syracuse	Passing	Garrett Shrader	14/28, 184 yards, 1 INT
Syracuse	Rushing	Garrett Shrader	25 carries, 195 yards, 4 TD
Syracuse	Receiving	Damien Alford	4 receptions, 70 yards
Purdue	Passing	Hudson Card	32/46, 323 yards, 1 TD, 1 INT
Purdue	Rushing	Tyrone Tracy Jr.	10 carries, 38 yards, 1 TD
Purdue	Receiving	Abdur-Rahmaan Yaseen	10 receptions, 114 yards

=== Wisconsin ===
Game Four – Wisconsin Badgers (2–1) vs. Purdue Boilermakers (1–2) – Game summary

Quarter	1	2	3	4	Total
Badgers	14	7	6	11	38
Boilermakers	3	0	14	0	17

at Ross-Ade Stadium, West Lafayette, Indiana

- Date: September 22, 2023
- Game time: 6:00 p.m.
- Game weather: 79 °F (26 °C); Cloudy; Wind at SE4 MPH
- Game attendance: 55,529
- Referee: Jeffrey Servinski
- TV announcers (FS1): Tim Brando (play-by-play) and Spencer Tillman (analyst)

Game information

First quarter

- WIS – Tanner Mordecai 14-yard run (Nathanial Vakos kick), 10:05 Wisconsin 7–0 Drive: 8 plays, 62 yards, 3:25.
- WIS – Tanner Mordecai 6-yard run (Nathanial Vakos kick), 3:26 Wisconsin 14–0 Drive: 7 plays, 38 yards, 2:44.
- PUR – Julio Macias 34-yard field goal, 0:17. Wisconsin 14–3. Drive: 8 plays, 58 yards, 3:09.

Second quarter

- WIS – Braelon Allen 14-yard run (Nathanial Vakos kick), 6:36 Wisconsin 21–3 Drive: 16 plays, 75 yards, 8:41.

Third quarter

- WIS – Nathanial Vakos 38-yard field goal, 11:44. Wisconsin 24–3. Drive: 7 plays, 46 yards, 3:07.
- PUR – Tyrone Tracy Jr. 19-yard run (Julio Macias kick), 8:42 Wisconsin 24–10 Drive: 8 plays, 75 yards, 3:02.
- WIS – Nathanial Vakos 22-yard field goal, 3:54. Wisconsin 27–10. Drive: 11 plays, 71 yards, 4:48.
- PUR – Hudson Card 6-yard run (Julio Macias kick), 0:00 Wisconsin 27–17 Drive: 9 plays, 75 yards, 3:54.

Fourth quarter

- WIS – Nathanial Vakos 48-yard field goal, 12:52. Wisconsin 30–17. Drive: 5 plays, 16 yards, 2:01.
- WIS – Braelon Allen 4-yard run (Tanner Mordecai pass), 3:35 Wisconsin 38–17 Drive: 3 plays, 26 yards, 1:27.

Top passers

- WIS – Tanner Mordecai – 17/27, 174 yards, 1 INT
- PUR – Hudson Card – 21/38, 202 yards, 2 INT

Top rushers

- WIS – Braelon Allen – 16 rushes, 116 yards, 2 TD
- PUR – Tyrone Tracy Jr. – 8 rushes, 84 yards, 1 TD

Top receivers

- WIS – Chimere Dike – 3 receptions, 67 yards
- PUR – Deion Burks – 6 receptions, 73 yards

Top defenders

- WIS – James Thompson Jr. – 6 tackles, 1 sack, 2 TFL, 1 PD
- PUR – Sanoussi Kane – 9 tackles, 2 TFL, 1 PD

=== at Iowa ===
Game Six – Purdue Boilermakers (2–3) at Iowa Hawkeyes (4–1) – Game summary

Quarter	1	2	3	4	Total
Boilermakers	0	7	0	7	14
Hawkeyes	7	3	3	7	20

at Kinnick Stadium • Iowa City, Iowa

- Date: October 7
- Game time: 3:30 p.m. EDT
- Game weather: Sunny • Temperature: 57 °F (14 °C) • Wind: NW at 9 miles per hour (14 km/h)
- Game attendance: 69,250
- Referee: Larry Smith
- TV announcers (Peacock): Jac Collinsworth (play-by-play), Jason Garrett (analyst), and Zora Stephenson (sideline reporter)
- Box score, Recap

Game information

First quarter

- (10:15) IOWA – Kaleb Johnson 67-yard run, Drew Stevens kick (Drive: 2 plays, 80 yards, 0:43; Iowa 7–0)

Second quarter

- (14:57) IOWA – Drew Stevens 27-yard field goal (Drive: 4 plays, 4 yards, 1:56; Iowa 10–0)
- (0:32) PUR – TJ Sheffield 43-yard pass from Hudson Card, Julio Macias kick (Drive: 7 plays, 69 yards, 2:00; Iowa 10–7)

Third quarter

- (7:58) IOWA – Drew Stevens 23-yard field goal (Drive: 9 plays, 75 yards, 3:45; Iowa 13–7)

Fourth quarter

- (14:24) IOWA – Erick All 22-yard pass from Deacon Hill, Drew Stevens kick (Drive: 6 plays, 46 yards, 2:22; Iowa 20–7)
- (2:54) PUR – Devin Mockobee 2-yard run, Julio Macias kick (Drive: 6 plays, 74 yards, 1:59; Iowa 20–14)

Statistics	PUR	IOWA
First downs	21	13
Plays–yards	80–343	56–291
Rushes–yards	40–96	35–181
Passing yards	247	110
Passing: comp–att–int	25–40–2	6–21–1
Time of possession	35:28	24:32

Team	Category	Player	Statistics
Purdue	Passing	Hudson Card	25/40, 247 yards, TD, 2 INT
Purdue	Rushing	Devin Mockobee	20 carries, 89 yards, TD
Purdue	Receiving	TJ Sheffield	6 receptions, 93 yards, TD
Iowa	Passing	Deacon Hill	6/21, 110 yards, TD, INT
Iowa	Rushing	Kaleb Johnson	17 carries, 134 yards, TD
Iowa	Receiving	Erick All	5 receptions, 97 yards, TD

=== No. 3 Ohio State ===
Game Seven – No. 3 Ohio State Buckeyes (5–0) at Purdue Boilermakers (2–4) – Game summary

Quarter	1	2	3	4	Total
No. 3 Buckeyes	13	7	14	7	41
Boilermakers	0	0	0	7	7

at Ross-Ade Stadium • West Lafayette, Indiana

- Date: October 14
- Game time: 12:00 p.m.
- Game weather: Cloudy • Temperature: 56 °F (13 °C) • Wind: NW at 7 miles per hour (11 km/h)
- Game attendance: 57,319
- Referee: Gregory Blum
- TV announcers (Peacock): Andrew Siciliano (play-by-play), Kyle Rudolph (analyst), and Lewis Johnson (sideline reporter)
- Box score, Recap

Game information

First quarter

- (9:11) OSU – Marvin Harrison Jr. 14-yard pass from Kyle McCord, Jayden Fielding kick failed (Drive: 8 plays, 69 yards, 2:43; Ohio State 6–0)
- (3:44) OSU – Devin Brown 2-yard run, Jayden Fielding kick (Drive: 8 plays, 51 yards, 4:06; Ohio State 13–0)

Second quarter

- (6:02) OSU – Cade Stover 4-yard pass from Kyle McCord, Jayden Fielding kick (Drive: 11 plays, 73 yards, 5:27; Ohio State 20–0)

Third quarter

- (12:24) OSU – Dallan Hayden 1-yard run, Jayden Fielding kick (Drive: 6 plays, 67 yards, 2:30; Ohio State 27–0)
- (4:36) OSU – Cade Stover 14-yard pass from Kyle McCord, Jayden Fielding kick (Drive: 5 plays, 80 yards, 2:59; Ohio State 34–0)

Fourth quarter

- (14:30) PUR – Deion Burks 6-yard pass from Hudson Card, Caleb Krockover kick (Drive: 6 plays, 20 yards, 1:15; Ohio State 34–7)
- (7:35) OSU – Brandon Inniss 58-yard pass from Devin Brown, Jayden Fielding kick (Drive: 3 plays, 64 yards, 1:23; Ohio State 41–7)

Statistics	OSU	PUR
First downs	24	15
Plays–yards	69–486	70–257
Rushes–yards	38–152	35–123
Passing yards	334	134
Passing: comp–att–int	17–30–0	14–35–0
Time of possession	32:27	27:33

Team	Category	Player	Statistics
Ohio State	Passing	Kyle McCord	16/28, 276 yards, 3 TD
Ohio State	Rushing	Dallan Hayden	11 carries, 76 yards, TD
Ohio State	Receiving	Marvin Harrison Jr.	6 receptions, 105 yards, TD
Purdue	Passing	Hudson Card	13/32, 126 yards, TD
Purdue	Rushing	Devin Mockobee	18 carries, 110 yards
Purdue	Receiving	Mershawn Rice	3 receptions, 50 yards

=== at Nebraska ===
Game Eight – Purdue Boilermakers (2–5) at Nebraska Cornhuskers (4–3) – Game summary

Quarter	1	2	3	4	Total
Boilermakers	0	0	0	14	14
Cornhuskers	0	14	7	10	31

at Memorial Stadium • Lincoln, Nebraska

- Date: October 28, 2023
- Game time: 2:30 PM
- Game weather: Cloudy, 37 °F (3 °C), Wind NW @ 8 mph (13 km/h)
- Game attendance: 86,709
- Referee: Ron Snodgrass
- TV announcers (FS1): Jeff Levering (play-by-play), Mark Helfrich (analyst)

Game information

Second quarter

- (10:43) NEB – Thomas Fidone II 1-yard pass from Heinrich Haarberg, Tristan Alvano kick (15 plays, 87 yards, 8:52, Nebraska 7–0)
- (8:54) NEB – Jaylen Lloyd 73-yard pass from Heinrich Haarberg, Tristan Alvano kick (1 play, 73 yards, 0:11, Nebraska 14–0)

Third quarter

- (12:02) NEB – Quinton Newsome 68-yard blocked field goal return, Tristan Alvano kick (Nebraska 21–0)

Fourth quarter

- (12:23) NEB – Tristan Alvano 55-yard field goal (6 plays, 14 yards, 2:32, Nebraska 24–0)
- (9:09) PUR – Jayden Dixon-Veal 29-yard pass from Hudson Card, 2PT PAT failed (3 plays, 24 yards, 0:46, Nebraska 24–6)
- (6:24) PUR – Kydran Jenkins 55-yard fumble return, Andrew Sowinski pass from Hudson Card (Nebraska 24–14)
- (3:54) NEB – Emmett Johnson 28-yard run, Tristan Alvano kick (6 plays, 48 yards, 2:29, Nebraska 31–14)

Statistics	PUR	NEB
First downs	10	14
Total yards	195	277
Rushes/yards	29/96	48/155
Passing yards	99	122
Passing: Comp–Att–Int	17–33–2	6–11–0
Time of possession	26:50	33:10

Team	Category	Player	Statistics
Purdue	Passing	Hudson Card	16/32, 100 yards, TD, 2 INT
Purdue	Rushing	Devin Mockobee	7 carries, 42 yards
Purdue	Receiving	Jayden Dixon-Veal	4 receptions, 38 yards, TD
Nebraska	Passing	Heinrich Haarberg	6/11, 122 yds, 2 TD
Nebraska	Rushing	Emmett Johnson	13 carries, 76 yards, TD
Nebraska	Receiving	Jaylen Lloyd	1 receptions, 73 yards, TD

=== at No. 3 Michigan ===
Game Nine – Purdue Boilermakers (2–6) at No. 3 Michigan Wolverines (8–0) – Game summary

Quarter	1	2	3	4	Total
Boilermakers	0	6	0	7	13
No. 3 Wolverines	17	3	7	14	41

at Michigan Stadium • Ann Arbor, Michigan

- Date: November 4, 2023
- Game time: 7:30 PM
- Game weather: Cloudy • Temperature: 50 °F (10 °C) • Wind: NE at 2 miles per hour (3.2 km/h)
- Game attendance: 110,245
- Referee: Chris Coyte
- TV announcers (NBC): Noah Eagle (play-by-play), Todd Blackledge (analyst) and Kathryn Tappen (sideline)

Game information

First quarter

- (10:30) MICH – Blake Corum 2-yard run, James Turner kick (Drive: 6 plays, 76 yards, 3:03, Michigan 7–0)
- (6:05) MICH – Blake Corum 3-yard run, James Turner kick (Drive: 7 plays, 67 yards, 3:14, Michigan 14–0)
- (4:20) MICH – James Turner 30-yard field goal (Drive: 4 plays, 0 yards, 1:34, Michigan 17–0)

Second quarter

- (7:10) MICH – James Turner 30-yard field goal (Drive: 10 plays, 67 yards, 4:32, Michigan 20–0)
- (3:52) PUR – Ben Freehill 32-yard field goal (Drive: 6 plays, 19 yards, 1:20, Michigan 20–3)
- (0:29) PUR – Ben Freehill 31-yard field goal (Drive: 6 plays, 20 yards, 1:48, Michigan 20–6)

Third quarter

- (3:12) MICH – Semaj Morgan 44-yard run, James Turner kick (Drive: 4 plays, 62 yards, 2:04, Michigan 27–6)

Fourth quarter

- (14:18) MICH – Blake Corum 3-yard run, James Turner kick (Drive: 5 plays, 45 yards, 2:48, Michigan 34–6)
- (4:30) MICH – Donovan Edwards 1-yard run, James Turner kick (Drive: 6 plays, 57 yards, 2:51, Michigan 41–6)
- (0:18) PUR – Deion Burks 24-yard pass from Hudson Card, Ben Freehill kick (Drive: 8 plays, 75 yards, 4:12, Michigan 41–13)

Statistics	PUR	MICH
First downs	10	22
Plays–yards	57–269	71–445
Rushes–yards	29–125	34–110
Passing yards	144	335
Passing: comp–att–int	12–28–1	24–37–0
Time of possession	26:06	33:54

Team	Category	Player	Statistics
Purdue	Passing	Hudson Card	12/28, 144 yards, TD, INT
Purdue	Rushing	Tyrone Tracy Jr.	11 carries, 61 yards
Purdue	Receiving	Deion Burks	3 receptions, 43 yards, TD
Michigan	Passing	J. J. McCarthy	24/37, 335 yards
Michigan	Rushing	Blake Corum	15 carries, 44 yards, 3 TD
Michigan	Receiving	Roman Wilson	9 receptions, 143 yards

=== Indiana ===
Game Twelve – Indiana Hoosiers (3–9) vs Purdue Boilermakers (4–8) – Game summary

Quarter	1	2	3	4	Total
Hoosiers	7	7	14	3	31
Boilermakers	0	12	6	17	35

at Ross-Ade Stadium • West Lafayette, Indiana

- Date: November 25th
- Game time: 12:00 p.m. EST
- Game weather: 36 °F (2 °C) • Wind: E at 4 miles per hour (6.4 km/h) • Weather: Cloudy
- Game attendance: 59,993
- TV announcers (BTN): Chris Vosters (play-by-play), Brock Vereen (analyst), Megan McKeown (sideline)

Game information

First quarter

- 0:34 IND - DeQuece Carter 33-yard pass from Brendan Sorsby (Chris Freeman kick) - Indiana 7-0, Drive: 5 plays, 72 yards, 1:59

Second quarter

- 12:07 PUR - George Burhenn 33-yard pass from Hudson Card (Two-Point Conversion failed) - Indiana 7-6, Drive: 7 plays, 66 yards, 3:20
- 8:59 IND - Donaven McCulley 10-yard pass from Brendan Sorsby (Chris Freeman kick) - Indiana 14-6, Drive: 8 plays, 49 yards, 2:58
- 0:12 PUR - Drew Biber 16-yard pass from Hudson Card (Two-Point Conversion failed) - Indiana 14-12, Drive: 12 plays, 78 yards, 2:34

Third quarter

- 13:14 PUR - Ben Freehill 33-yard field goal - Purdue 15-14, Drive: 7 plays, 29 yards, 1:36
- 13:02 IND - Jaylin Lucas 100-yard kickoff return (Chris Freeman kick) - Indiana 21-15
- 10:37 PUR - Ben Freehill 44-yard field goal - Indiana 21-18, Drive: 7 plays, 53 yards, 2:21
- 1:43 IND - Josh Henderson 9-yard pass from Brendan Sorsby (Chris Freeman kick) - Indiana 28-18, Drive: 8 plays, 87 yards, 3:15

Fourth quarter

- 14:53 PUR - Devin Mockobee 38-yard pass from Hudson Card (Ben Freehill Kick) - Indiana 28-25, Drive: 6 plays, 63 yards, 1:43
- 8:41 PUR - Ben Freehill 35-yard field goal - Tied 28-28, Drive: 11 plays, 52 yards, 4:55
- 5:09 IND - Chris Freeman 35-yard field goal - Indiana 31-28, Drive: 7 plays, 49 yards, 3:26
- 2:39 PUR - Hudson Card 10-yard run (Chris Freeman kick) - Purdue 35-31, Drive: 5 plays, 65 yards, 2:30

Statistics	Indiana	Purdue
First downs	22	25
Plays–yards	66–359	81–453
Rushes–yards	35–133	47–178
Passing yards	226	275
Passing: comp–att–int	17–31–3	21–34–0
Turnovers		
Time of possession	26:59	33:01

Team	Category	Player	Statistics
Indiana	Passing	Brendan Sorsby	17/31, 226 yards, 3 TD, 3 INT
Indiana	Rushing	Josh Henderson	9 carries, 44 yards
Indiana	Receiving	E.J. Williams Jr.	6 receptions, 97 yards
Purdue	Passing	Hudson Card	21/34, 275 yards, 3 TD
Purdue	Rushing	Hudson Card	12 carries, 85 yards, TD
Purdue	Receiving	Deion Burks	7 receptions, 87 yards

== Awards and honors ==
=== Award watch lists ===
Listed in the order that they were released

Award	Player	Position	Year	Date Awarded	Ref
Maxwell Award	Hudson Card	QB	JR	July 31, 2023	
Outland Trophy	Gus Hartwig	C	SR	August 1, 2023	
Ray Guy Award	Jack Ansell	P	JR	August 2, 2023	
Rimington Trophy	Gus Hartwig	C	SR	August 4, 2023	
Doak Walker Award	Devin Mockobee	RB	SO	August 9, 2023	

=== Weekly Awards ===
Weekly Awards
Player	Award	Date Awarded	Ref.
Dillon Thieneman	Big Ten Freshman of the Week	September 5, 2023	
Dillon Thieneman	Big Ten Freshman of the Week	October 9, 2023	
Dillon Thieneman	Big Ten Freshman of the Week	October 30, 2023	
Dillon Thieneman	Big Ten Freshman of the Week	November 13, 2023	
Dillon Thieneman	Big Ten Freshman of the Week	November 27, 2023	

=== All-Conference Honors ===
Big Ten Awards
Award	Player	Position
Thompson-Randle El Freshman of the Year	Dillon Thieneman	DB

All-Conference Teams
Player	Position	Coaches	Media
Dillon Thieneman	DB	2nd Team	3rd Team
Dione Burks	WR	2nd Team	
Nic Scourton	DL	2nd Team	
Tyrone Tracy Jr.	RS	3rd Team	HM
Kydran Jenkins	LB	HM	HM
Sanoussi Kane	S	HM	HM
Isaiah Nichols	DE	HM	
HM = Honorable mention. Reference:
