= Devin Mockobee =

American football player (born 2003)

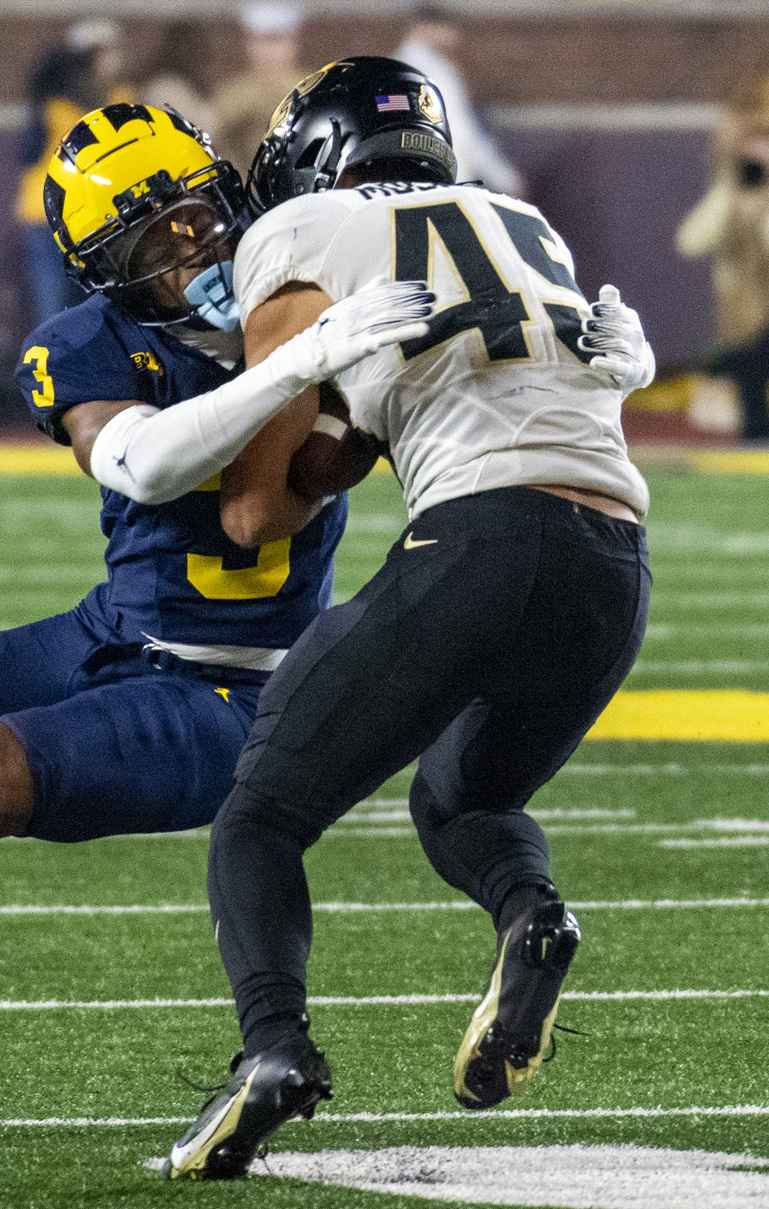
- Mockobee with Purdue in 2023

Profile
- Position: Running back

Personal information
- Born: January 18, 2003 (age 23)
- Listed height: 5 ft 11 in (1.80 m)
- Listed weight: 202 lb (92 kg)

Career information
- High school: Boonville (Boonville, Indiana)
- College: Purdue; (2021–2025)
- NFL draft: 2026: undrafted

Devin Mockobee (born January 18, 2003) is an American former college football player who was a running back for the Purdue Boilermakers.

== Early life ==
Mockobee attended Boonville High School in Boonville, Indiana, where he rushed for 3,568 yards and 45 touchdowns and caught 21 passes for 357 yards and three touchdowns. He also played as a defensive back racking up 119 tackles, with two being for a loss, two sacks, 13 pass deflections, five fumble recoveries, and four interceptions. As a senior Mockobee had a career performance against Gibson Southern in which he rushed for 415 yards and five touchdowns on 27 carries in a 43–35 loss. He initially committed to play college football at Navy. However he decided to flip his commitment to instead walk on at Purdue University.

== College career ==
In his collegiate debut in 2022, Mockobee rushed for 78 yards and a touchdown in a 56–0 win against Indiana State. In week 5, he rushed for a 112 yards and a touchdown to help Purdue upset Minnesota 20–10. In week 7 Mockobee rushed for 178 yards and a touchdown in a 43–37 win over Nebraska, setting the school record for the most rushing yards by a freshman and earning Big Ten Conference freshman of the week honors. In week 9 he rushed for a 106 yards on 28 carries and a touchdown in a win over #21 Illinois. In the season finale Mockobee rushed for 99 yards and a touchdown in a 30–16 win over rival Indiana, helping Purdue advance to the Big Ten Championship. He was named the Big Ten co-freshman of the week. In the Big Ten Championship game Mockobee had Purdue's first touchdown of the game on a one-yard rushing touchdown to tie the game 7–7. He finished the season with 968 rushing yards and nine touchdowns and brought in 32 receptions for 274 yards. Mockobee set the school record for most rushing yards by a freshman. After the season he was awarded a scholarship by new head coach Ryan Walters.

=== Statistics ===
Year	Team	Games		Rushing				Receiving			
Year	Team	GP	GS	Att	Yds	Avg	TD	Rec	Yds	Avg	TD
2021	Purdue	0	—	DNP							
2022	Purdue	13	7	195	968	5.0	9	32	274	8.6	0
2023	Purdue	12	4	172	811	4.7	6	19	180	9.5	1
2024	Purdue	6		71	464	6.5	2	9	78	8.7	1
Career		31	11	438	2,243	5.1	17	60	532	8.9	2

== Professional career ==
Pre-draft measurables
Height	Weight	Arm length	Hand span	Wingspan	40-yard dash	10-yard split	20-yard split	20-yard shuttle	Three-cone drill	Vertical jump	Broad jump
5 ft 11 1/2 in (1.82 m)	202 lb (92 kg)	30 1/2 in (0.77 m)	9 1/2 in (0.24 m)	6 ft 2 1/8 in (1.88 m)	4.82 s	1.68 s	2.82 s	4.64 s	7.14 s	32.5 in (0.83 m)	9 ft 10 in (3.00 m)
All values from Pro Day

== Personal life ==
After graduating from Purdue University with a degree in mechanical engineering technology, Mockobee joined ECR Engines working as a mechanic.
