= Max Klare =

American football player (born 2003)

No. 86 – Los Angeles Rams
- Position: Tight end
- Roster status: Active

Personal information
- Born: July 8, 2003 (age 23); Guilford, Indiana, U.S.
- Listed height: 6 ft 4 in (1.93 m)
- Listed weight: 246 lb (112 kg)

Career information
- High school: St. Xavier (Cincinnati, Ohio)
- College: Purdue (2022–2024); Ohio State (2025)
- NFL draft: 2026: 2nd round, 61st overall pick

Career history
- Los Angeles Rams (2026–present)

Awards and highlights
- First-team All-Big Ten (2025); Third-team All-Big Ten (2024)
- Stats at Pro Football Reference

Maxwell Ignatius Klare (born July 8, 2003) is an American professional football tight end for the Los Angeles Rams of the National Football League (NFL). He previously played college football for the Purdue Boilermakers and Ohio State Buckeyes and was selected by the Rams in the second round of the 2026 NFL draft.

== Early life ==
Klare was born on July 8, 2003, in Guilford, Indiana. He attended St. Xavier High School in Cincinnati, Ohio. He was rated as a three-star recruit and committed to play college football for the Purdue Boilermakers over other schools such as Cincinnati, Duke, Eastern Michigan, and Georgia Tech.

== College career ==
As a freshman in 2022, Klare played in two games where he recorded no statistics. In week two of the 2023 season, he hauled in eight receptions for 64 yards against the Virginia Tech Hokies. However, in week six of the 2023 season, Klare suffered a season-ending ankle injury. Klare finished the 2023 season, totaling 22 receptions for 196 yards. In week one of the 2024 season, Klare notched five receptions for 71 yards and his first career touchdown, as he helped the Boilermakers to a 49–0 win over Indiana State.

On December 23, 2024, Klare transferred to Ohio State.

=== Statistics ===
Year	Team	GP	Receiving			
Year	Team	GP	Rec	Yds	Avg	TD
2022	Purdue	2	0	0	–	0
2023	Purdue	5	22	196	8.9	0
2024	Purdue	12	51	685	13.4	4
2025	Ohio State	14	43	448	10.4	2
Career		33	116	1,329	11.5	6

== Professional career ==
Pre-draft measurables
Height	Weight	Arm length	Hand span	Wingspan
6 ft 4 3/8 in (1.94 m)	246 lb (112 kg)	32 1/8 in (0.82 m)	9 1/8 in (0.23 m)	6 ft 5 7/8 in (1.98 m)
All values from NFL Combine

Klare was selected by the Los Angeles Rams in the second round with the 61st overall pick in the 2026 NFL draft.
