= Will Heldt =

American football player (born 2005)

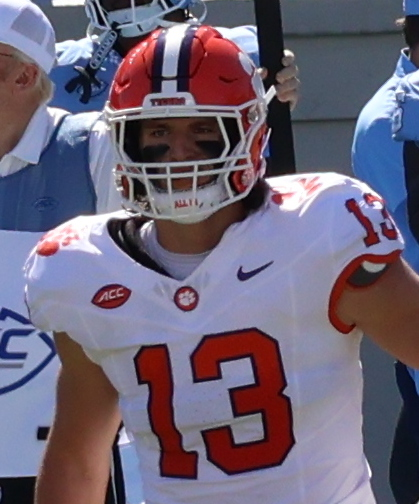
- Heldt with the Clemson Tigers in 2025

No. 13 – Clemson Tigers
- Position: Defensive end
- Class: Senior

Personal information
- Born: February 15, 2005 (age 21)
- Listed height: 6 ft 6 in (1.98 m)
- Listed weight: 260 lb (118 kg)

Career information
- High school: Carmel (Carmel, Indiana)
- College: Purdue (2023–2024); Clemson (2025–present)

Awards and highlights
- Third-team All-ACC (2025)
- Stats at ESPN

Will Heldt (born February 15, 2005) is an American college football defensive end for the Clemson Tigers.

== Career ==
Heldt attended Carmel High School in Carmel, Indiana. During his high school career he had 190 tackles and 10 sacks. He committed to Purdue University to play college football.

Heldt played in all 12 games as a true freshman for the Boilermakers in 2023 and had 12 tackles. He became a starter his sophomore year in 2024.

After his sophomore season, Heldt entered the transfer portal. He committed to Clemson University on December 19, 2024, making him coach Dabo Swinney's first defensive transfer.

=== Statistics ===
College statistics
Year	Team	Games	Tackles				
Year	Team	Games	Total	Solo	Ast	TFL	Sacks
2023	Purdue	12	12	8	4	1.0	0.0
2024	Purdue	12	56	37	19	10.0	5.0
2025	Clemson	13	46	20	26	15.5	7.5
Career		37	114	65	49	26.5	12.5
