= Trent Walker =

American sound engineer

Trent Walker is an American sound engineer who was nominated for the 2008 Grammy Award for Best Engineered Album, Classical, shared with Bruce Leek and Fred Vogler, for the Mormon Tabernacle Choir's album Spirit of the Season.

Since 2005, Walker has been the senior audio engineer on the Bonneville Communications show Music and the Spoken Word, which features the Mormon Tabernacle Choir at the Conference Center of the Church of Jesus Christ of Latter-day Saints in Salt Lake City, Utah. He has also worked on live shows for AC/DC, The Beach Boys, America, Chuck Mangione, CAKE and Reel Big Fish. Formerly, he worked at Brigham Young University Idaho, in Rexburg, Idaho, and also owned and operated Rockhouse Recording Studio.
