= Ryan Walters (American football) =

American football player and coach (born 1986)

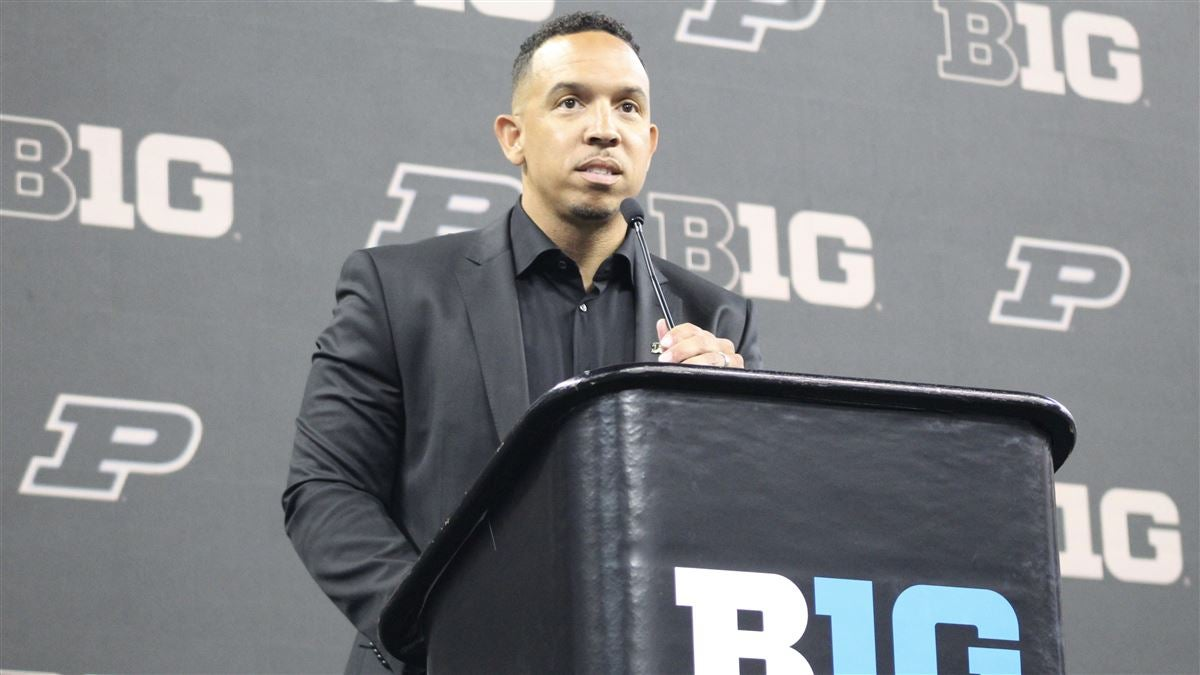
- Walters in 2023

Current position
- Title: Defensive coordinator
- Team: Washington
- Conference: Big Ten
- Annual salary: $1.2M

Biographical details
- Born: January 21, 1986 (age 40); Los Angeles, California, U.S.
- Height: 5 ft 11 in (180 cm)

Playing career
- 2004–2008: Colorado
- Position: Safety

Coaching career (HC unless noted)
- 2009: Colorado (SA)
- 2010: Arizona (GA)
- 2011: Arizona (DB)
- 2012: Oklahoma (GA)
- 2013: North Texas (CB)
- 2014: Memphis (CB)
- 2015: Missouri (S)
- 2016–2017: Missouri (co-DC/S)
- 2018–2020: Missouri (DC/S)
- 2021–2022: Illinois (DC)
- 2023–2024: Purdue
- 2025–present: Washington (DC)

Head coaching record
- Overall: 5–19

Ryan Walters (born January 21, 1986) is an American college football coach who is the defensive coordinator for the University of Washington. He played college football for Colorado from 2004 to 2008. He then served as the defensive coordinator for the Missouri Tigers (2018–2020) and on the Illinois Fighting Illini (2021–2022). He was also the head football coach of the Purdue Boilermakers (2023–2024).

Walters was born in Los Angeles, California. His father, Marc, was a quarterback for Colorado. He attended Grandview High School in Aurora, Colorado. After graduation from high school, he accepted a football scholarship to the University of Colorado Boulder. After spending his freshman season as a redshirt, he converted from quarterback to safety. He started for three seasons, helping the Buffaloes to two bowl games, earning honorable mention All-Big 12 Conference as a senior.

After going undrafted in the 2009 NFL draft, Walters turned to coaching, eventually being named the youngest (25 years old) position coach in the Pac-10 Conference during the 2011 season. After various stops along the way, Walters was promoted to defensive coordinator for the Missouri Tigers (2018–2020) and the Illinois Fighting Illini (2021–2022). On December 13, 2022, he was named the 37th head coach in the history of Purdue University.

== Early life ==
Walters was born in Los Angeles, California to parents Marc and Nicole. Soon after his birth, his father had accepted a scholarship to play quarterback for the Colorado Buffaloes. During his father's playing days, his babysitter was National Football League coach Eric Bieniemy. After his father's playing days, he grew up in Aurora, Colorado, while his father worked as a lawyer for Qwest.

== Playing career ==
Walters attended Grandview High School, where he played quarterback. As a junior in 2002, he threw for 1,582 yards and 15 touchdowns, while also running for 478 yards and 11 scores before a meniscus tear ended his season. As a senior in 2003, he broke the Grandview record for career touchdown passes, 36, a record that stood until 2020. The spring before his senior season, Walters committed to play college football at Colorado and head coach Gary Barnett. As a senior, he racked up 1,549 passing yards (59.2 completion percentage, 14 TDs), limiting his running as he played hurt a good portion of the season as he played in just nine games.

College recruiting
Name	Hometown	School	Height	Weight	Commit date
Ryan Walters; QB	Aurora, Colorado	Grandview HS	6 ft 0 in (1.83 m)	195 lb (88 kg)	Jul 9, 2003
Ryan Walters; QB	Recruit ratings: Rivals: 247Sports:				
Overall recruit ranking: 247Sports: 350
Note: In many cases, Scout, Rivals, 247Sports, On3, and ESPN may conflict in their listings of height and weight.; In these cases, the average was taken. ESPN grades are on a 100-point scale.; Sources: "Colorado 2004 Football Commitments". Rivals.; "2004 Team Ranking". Rivals.com.; "Colorado 2004 Football Commits". 247Sports.

=== Freshman season (2005) ===
Walters was able to graduate high school early in December, and enrolled at the University of Colorado in January 2004. He entered his true freshman season as the sixth quarterback on the Buffaloes' depth chart. After an illness kept him out of most of the spring practices, he was asked to move to safety to help the team prepare. His play impressed the Colorado coaching staff so much, that he was moved to the defensive side of the ball permanently. He took the fall of his true freshman season to redshirt and gain muscle. As a redshirt freshman he played in 9 games. For the 2005 season, he recorded 16 tackles with his season high of four coming against Texas in the 2005 Big 12 Championship Game. Walters also recorded three pass breakups and two quarterback hurries.

=== Sophomore season (2006) ===
In 2006, as a sophomore, Walters claimed a starting safety position for the Buffaloes. Against Texas Tech, he recorded both his first and second interceptions. As a result, he was awarded the Big 12 Conference defensive player of the week. Against Kansas, Walters recorded his first collegiate touchdown, with a 95-yard fumble recovery. He had a season-high 11 tackles against Arizona State.

=== Junior season (2007) ===
Walters was a preseason first-team All-Big 12 selection by both Athlon and The Sporting News. In week 1, Walters established what would end up being a career high, 16 tackles against Colorado State. Against #3 Oklahoma, Walters intercepted a pass from quarterback Sam Bradford, which lead to an touchdown on the ensuing drive. In the 2007 Independence Bowl, he had an interception, setting up Colorado's first touchdown of the bowl.

=== Senior season (2008) ===
Walters entered his senior year as the starter at free safety. He was named a preseason third team All-Big 12 by Phil Steele’s College Football and voted a team captain by his teammates. He opened the season with 10 tackles and an interception against Colorado State. Against Iowa State, Walters tied his career-high with 16 tackles. He finished the season with honorable mention All-Big 12 honors, first-team All-Colorado honors from the state's National Football Foundation and was voted that seasons team MVP by his teammates. He finished his career with 5 interceptions. Walters graduated from Colorado in 2008 with a degree in history. He went undrafted in the 2009 NFL draft, and returned to Colorado to continue his education.

=== College statistics ===
Year	Team	Tackles						Interceptions				
Year	Team	Solo	Ast	Cmb	TfL	Sck	FF	Int	Yds	Avg	TD	PD
2005	Colorado	12	4	16	0	0	0	0	0	0.0	0	0
2006	Colorado	41	16	57	1.0	0	1	2	-2	-1.0	1	3
2007	Colorado	31	32	63	0	0	2	1	0	0.0	0	5
2008	Colorado	63	24	87	1.0	2.0	2	2	37	18.5	0	7
Career		147	76	203	2.0	2.0	5	5	35	7.0	1	15

Pre-draft measurables
Height	Weight	40-yard dash	10-yard split	20-yard split	20-yard shuttle	Three-cone drill	Vertical jump	Broad jump	Bench press
5 ft 11 1/8 in (1.81 m)	206 lb (93 kg)	4.62 s	1.64 s	2.69 s	4.33 s	7.01 s	35.0 in (0.89 m)	9 ft 5 in (2.87 m)	27 reps
All values from Pro Day

== Coaching career ==
=== Early career ===
Walters began his coaching career as a student assistant at Colorado, working with the secondary in 2009. He then moved to Arizona, where he spent one season as a graduate assistant in 2010, and was promoted to defensive backs coach for the 2011 season. At the time of his promotion, he was the youngest assistant coach in the Pac-10 Conference, at the age of 25. In 2012, Walters worked as a graduate assistant under Bob Stoops at Oklahoma, as the Sooners went 10–3 and played in the 2013 Cotton Bowl. Walters then spent one season as cornerbacks coach at North Texas under head coach Dan McCarney in 2013. The team would end up playing in 2014 Heart of Dallas Bowl. He spent the 2014 season as the cornerbacks coach for the Memphis Tigers helping them reach the 2014 Miami Beach Bowl.

=== Missouri ===
Walters then followed Barry Odom from Memphis to Missouri to join Gary Pinkel's Missouri staff in February of 2015 as safeties coach. Following Pinkel's retirement, and Odom's promotion to head coach, Walters was promoted to co-defensive coordinator and safeties coach in 2016. On December 8, 2017, Odom promoted Walters to full-time defensive coordinator in 2018 in addition to serving as the secondary coach. He was a holdover after the 2020 coaching change to Eliah Drinkwitz.

=== Illinois ===
In January 2021, a report surfaced that Walters was among three finalists to join Bret Bielema's new staff at Illinois. The other finalists were reportedly Oklahoma State defensive coordinator Jim Knowles, and Arkansas defensive coordinator Barry Odom, Walters' former boss at Missouri. Odom eventually elected to stay with Arkansas, and on January 6, 2021, Walters was announced as the new DC for the Illini. In 2022, the Illini defense under Walters was 2nd nationally in points allowed, 3rd in total defense, 3rd in yards per play, 1st in interceptions, and 1st in takeaways. Walters was named a finalist for the 2022 Broyles Award, celebrating the nation's top coordinator.

=== Purdue ===
==== 2023 season ====
On December 13, 2022, Purdue University announced Walters as the 37th head football coach in program history. At the time of his hiring, Walters ranked as the 4th youngest coach in the FBS. His new contract with Purdue was for five years. Walters went to work right away on recruiting primarily the offensive line, defensive back and at the quarterback position, while primarily focusing on the transfer portal as opposed to high school recruits. bringing in eleven transfers to help get instant depth, including four offensive linemen and five defensive backs.

In his first ever game as head coach, Purdue was defeated by Fresno State 39–35 in a close game played at Ross-Ade Stadium. The next week Walters achieved his first win at Purdue with a 24–17 victory over Virginia Tech and followed that with a blowout loss (35–20) at home against Syracuse. Purdue hosted Wisconsin the next week in a game that saw the Boilermakers lose 38–17. Heading into week 5, Walters and his team hosted Illinois, as they looked to improve 2–3 on the season, but would dominate their rivals during homecoming, winning the game 44–19. However, Purdue would lose their next four games of the season against Iowa (20–14), #3 Ohio State (41–7), Nebraska (31–14) and #3 Michigan (41–13). With frustrations of how the offense was playing, Purdue went into Minnesota and won their biggest game of the season with a 49–30 win over the Golden Gophers. The offensive explosion was something the team had been lacking for several weeks. The following week, the Boilermakers traveled to Northwestern, where their offense struggled with backup quarterbacks leading the offense in the absence of Hudson Card, losing 23–15. Purdue would follow its loss to Northwestern up with a win against arch-rival Indiana 35–31 in the Old Oaken Bucket.

==== 2024 season ====
During his second year as head coach of the Boilermakers, Walters led his team from a sub-par season in 2023 to a "brutal" 1–11 regular season record. Purdue finished the regular season winless in Big Ten Conference for the first time since 2013.

His second season as Purdue head coach began with a 49–0 victory over the Indiana State Sycamores at the Ross-Ade Stadium. Purdue lost the next two games against No. 18 ranked Notre Dame and Oregon State before entering B1G play. The Boilermakers followed those defeats with a 28-10 loss to the Nebraska Cornhuskers. After the Nebraska game, the Boilermakers lost consecutive road games against the Wisconsin Badgers and the No. 23 Illinois Fighting Illini and finished the month of October with a 35–0 defeat to No. 2 Oregon Ducks. Following a bye week, Purdue was defeated by Northwestern, 26–20 in overtime. The following week Purdue traveled to Columbus, OH, getting shutout by No. 2 Ohio State 45–0. On Senior day, the Boilermakers were dominated by No. 4 Penn State 49–10. The following week, Purdue traveled to East Lansing, MI losing a close game to Michigan State 24–17. In the season finale, Purdue traveled to Bloomington were they were dominated by the No. 10 Indiana Hoosiers, 66–0. Following the conclusion of the season, Walters was fired as the head coach at Purdue.

=== Washington ===
On January 3, 2025, Walters was hired as the defensive coordinator for the University of Washington.

== Personal life ==
Walters and his wife have two sons.

== Head coaching record ==
Year	Team	Overall	Conference	Standing	Bowl/playoffs
Purdue Boilermakers (Big Ten Conference) (2023–2024)
2023	Purdue	4–8	3–6	T–4th (West)	
2024	Purdue	1–11	0–9	18th	
Purdue:		5–19	3–15		
Total:		5–19			
