= Kevin Kane (American football) =

American football coach (born 1983)

Biographical details
- Born: December 18, 1983 (age 42); Kansas City, Missouri, U.S.
- Education: University of Kansas (BS, 2006); University of Wisconsin (MS, 2010)

Playing career
- 2002–2005: Kansas
- Position: Linebacker

Coaching career (HC unless noted)
- 2006–2007: Kansas (SA)
- 2008–2009: Wisconsin (GA)
- 2010: Wisconsin (DQC)
- 2011: Northern Illinois (TE/FB)
- 2012: Northern Illinois (LB)
- 2013–2014: Northern Illinois (ST/LB)
- 2015: Kansas (LB)
- 2016–2017: Northern Illinois (DC/S)
- 2018–2020: SMU (DC/LB)
- 2021–2022: Illinois (assoc. HC/OLB)
- 2023–2024: Purdue (DC/LB)
- 2025: Minnesota (OLB/nickels)
- 2026: Purdue (DC)

Kevin Kane (born December 18, 1983) is an American college football coach and former linebacker. He played college football at Kansas from 2002 to 2005. He served as the defensive coordinator of the Northern Illinois Huskies (2016–2017), SMU Mustangs (2018–2020), the Purdue Boilermakers (2023–2024; 2026), and the Minnesota Golden Gophers (2025).

== Playing career ==
Born in Kansas City, Missouri on December 18, 1983, Kane attended Rockhurst High School, where he helped lead the team to a state championship in his junior season.

Kane played linebacker for the Kansas Jayhawks from 2002 to 2005. He was twice named Honorable Mention All-Big 12, and was Academic All-Big 12 three times. Kane was named a team captain for his senior season.

== Coaching career ==
After finishing Kane's playing career in 2005, he spent the next two seasons as a student assistant with his alma mater, Kansas.

In 2008, Kane joined the Wisconsin football program, as a defensive graduate assistant for two seasons, and then as a defensive quality control coach in 2010. While at Wisconsin Kane worked with the defensive line and linebackers under Bret Bielema and Dave Doeren.

In 2011, Kane began his first stint as Northern Illinois University. He coached the tight ends and fullbacks in 2011, before moving to the defensive side of the ball from 2012-2014, coaching the safeties and linebackers. Kane also coordinated the special teams in 2013 and 2014.

For the 2015 football season, Kane returned to his alma mater, coaching the Kansas linebackers. The following year, he returned to Northern Illinois as the teams defensive coordinator and safeties coach.

In January 2018, it was announced that Kane would join new head coach Sonny Dykes at SMU as the defensive coordinator. In 2018 Kane was named a Broyles award nominee.

Kane was named the associate head coach & outside linebackers coach at Illinois in January 2021. The move reunited Kane with Bret Bielema, whom he worked under at Wisconsin. In 2022, Kane assisted defensive coordinator Ryan Walters to lead one of the top defenses in the Nation. The Fighting Illini defense finished the year in the top 8 in rushing defense, passing defense, total defense, and number one in scoring defense after giving up 12.3 points per game. This stellar performance helped Walters land the head coaching position at Purdue.

Following the 2022 season, Kane followed Walters to Purdue as the defensive coordinator.

== Personal life ==
Kane and his wife Theresa have three children.
