= Hudson Card =

American football player (born 2001)

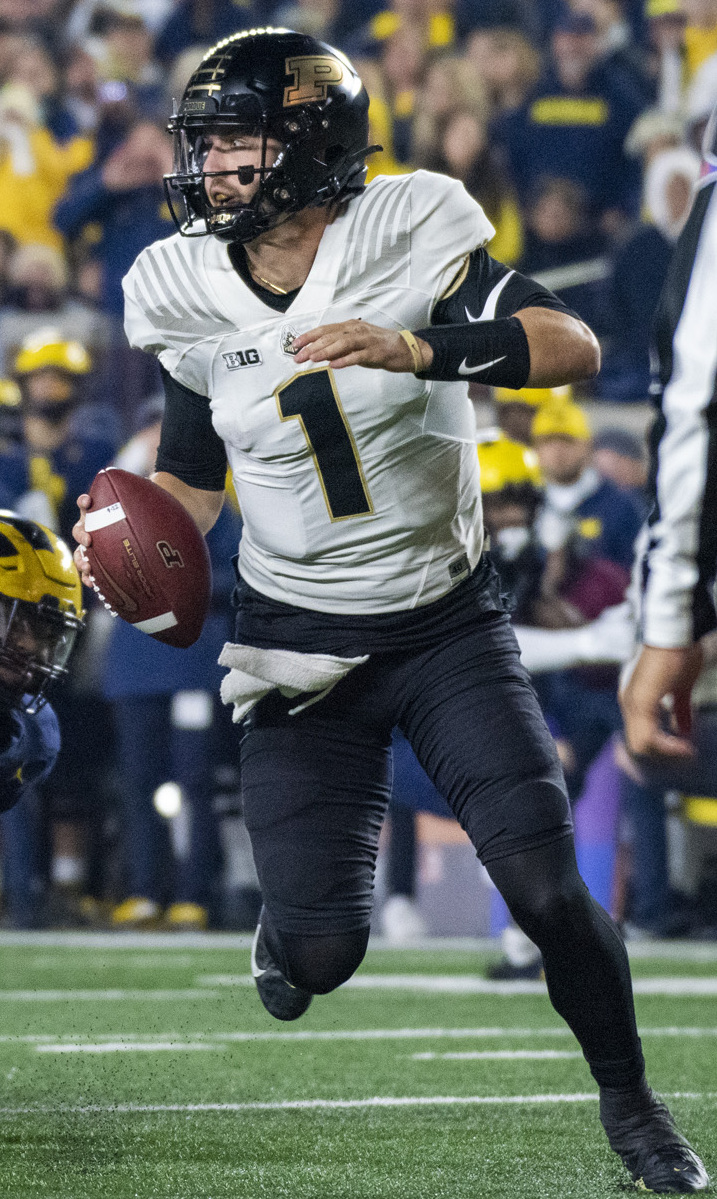
- Card with Purdue in 2023

Profile
- Position: Quarterback

Personal information
- Born: July 29, 2001 (age 25); Austin, Texas, U.S.
- Listed height: 6 ft 2 in (1.88 m)
- Listed weight: 200 lb (91 kg)

Career information
- High school: Lake Travis (Austin)
- College: Texas (2020–2022); Purdue (2023–2024)
- NFL draft: 2025: undrafted

Hudson Card (born July 29, 2001) is a former American football quarterback. He played college football for the Texas Longhorns and the Purdue Boilermakers. He was a highly touted four-star prospect from Lake Travis High School in Austin, Texas. He played in the 2020 Under Armour All-America Game.

Card saw limited action at Texas as a true freshman. During the lead-up to the 2021 season, he was named the starting quarterback, but lost the role to Casey Thompson after just two games. During the 2022 season, he started three games in place of an injured Quinn Ewers. He transferred to Purdue for his redshirt junior season.

== Early life ==
Card attended Lake Travis High School in Austin, Texas. As a sophomore, he earned the varsity backup quarterback position, but due to his athleticism, the coaching staff started him as a slot wide receiver next to Garrett Wilson. As a receiver, he hauled in 69 receptions for 1,137 yards and 13 touchdowns. He also threw for 597 yards as the reserve quarterback. Despite not playing as a quarterback for most of the season, he earned several scholarship offers, committing to the Texas Longhorns on May 25, 2018. As a senior, he was selected to the 2020 Under Armour All-American Game.

== College career ==
=== Texas ===
In 2020, as a true freshman, Card played in two games as a backup to Sam Ehlinger, and ended up taking a redshirt. In 2021, as a redshirt freshman, he competed with Casey Thompson for the starting job. He won the competition and was named the starter for the opening game. In Card's first start, he went 14-for-21 on pass attempts, threw for 224 yards, 2 touchdowns, and no interceptions in the 38–18 win over Louisiana-Lafayette. However, Card lost the starting job after a poor performance in a 40–21 blowout loss versus Arkansas. On November 29, 2022, Card announced he was entering the transfer portal and he left before the team played in the 2022 Alamo Bowl.

He was first-team Academic All-Big 12 in both 2021 and 2022.

=== Purdue ===
Card announced via Twitter he committed to Purdue on December 26, 2022.

Card was the Boilermakers starting quarterback for the season, though he missed the Northwestern game with an injury and battled shoulder and rib injuries all season. Despite that he was placed on the preseason Maxwell Award watch list, he led the team to a 4–8 record and tie for last in the Big 10 West, one year after the team went to the Big 10 Championship game.

Card started the season on the Manning Award and Johnny Unitas Golden Arm Award watch lists, but it was tough year for him and the Boilermakers. In the season opener of the 2024 season against Indiana State, Card tied Greyson Lambert's FBS completion percentage with 96% on a minimum of 20 pass attempts. In the victory, Card was 24-of-25 with 273 yards passing and four touchdowns. It would be the team's only win of the season as they went 1–11 and came in last place in the Big 10. Adding injury to insult, Card missed two games – against Illinois and Oregon – due to upper body injuries and the concussion protocol.

=== Statistics ===
Year	Team	Games			Passing								Rushing			
Year	Team	GP	GS	Record	Cmp	Att	Pct	Yds	Avg	TD	INT	Rtg	Att	Yds	Avg	TD
2020	Texas	2	0	—	1	3	33.3	5	1.7	0	0	47.3	4	11	2.8	0
2021	Texas	8	2	1–1	51	83	61.4	590	7.1	5	1	138.6	26	17	0.7	1
2022	Texas	12	3	2–1	75	108	69.4	928	8.6	6	1	158.1	17	46	2.7	0
2023	Purdue	11	11	4–7	215	365	58.9	2,387	6.5	15	8	123.0	93	203	2.2	5
2024	Purdue	10	10	1–9	144	248	58.1	1,641	6.6	9	7	120.0	46	−27	−0.6	0
Career		43	26	8–18	486	807	60.2	5,551	6.9	35	17	128.1	186	250	1.3	6

== Professional career ==
Pre-draft measurables
Height	Weight	Arm length	Hand span	40-yard dash	10-yard split	20-yard split	20-yard shuttle	Three-cone drill	Vertical jump	Broad jump
6 ft 2 3/8 in (1.89 m)	200 lb (91 kg)	30 1/4 in (0.77 m)	8 3/4 in (0.22 m)	4.79 s	1.64 s	2.68 s	4.37 s	6.96 s	32.0 in (0.81 m)	9 ft 7 in (2.92 m)
All values from Pro Day

In January 2025, Card declared for the 2025 NFL draft, but was not selected.
