= Gus Hartwig =

American football player (born 2002)

No. 66 – Atlanta Falcons
- Position: Center
- Roster status: Practice squad

Personal information
- Born: January 21, 2002 (age 24); Zionsville, Indiana, U.S.
- Listed height: 6 ft 5 in (1.96 m)
- Listed weight: 309 lb (140 kg)

Career information
- High school: Zionsville Community (IN)
- College: Purdue (2020–2024)
- NFL draft: 2025: undrafted

Career history
- New York Jets (2025); Detroit Lions (2026)*; Atlanta Falcons (2026–present)*
- * Offseason or practice squad member only
- Stats at Pro Football Reference

Gus Hartwig (born January 21, 2002) is an American professional football center for the Atlanta Falcons of the National Football League (NFL). He played college football for the Purdue Boilermakers.

== Early life ==
Hartwig attended Zionsville Community High School in Zionsville, Indiana, and was selected to play in the 2020 All-American Bowl. He was rated as a four-star recruit and committed to play college football for the Purdue Boilermakers.

== College career ==
As a freshman in 2020, Hartwig played in six games while making three starts en route to being named a Big Ten Conference honorable mention. In 2021, he started all 13 games for the Boilermakers. Ahead of the 2022 season, Hartwig was named to the Rimington Trophy watchlist. That season, he started 11 games for the Boilermakers before suffering an injury. In 2023, Hartwig started nine games after missing the first three due to an injury from 2022, once again earning an all-Big Ten honorable mention.

== Professional career ==
Pre-draft measurables
Height	Weight	Arm length	Hand span	Wingspan	40-yard dash	10-yard split	20-yard split	20-yard shuttle	Three-cone drill	Vertical jump	Broad jump	Bench press
6 ft 5 1/4 in (1.96 m)	309 lb (140 kg)	32 7/8 in (0.84 m)	9 7/8 in (0.25 m)	6 ft 7 1/2 in (2.02 m)	5.27 s	1.78 s	3.03 s	4.92 s	7.70 s	29.5 in (0.75 m)	8 ft 7 in (2.62 m)	18 reps
All values from Pro Day

=== New York Jets ===
Hartwig signed with the New York Jets as an undrafted free agent on May 9, 2025. He was waived/injured on July 29 and placed on injured reserve. On May 7, 2026, Hartwig was waived by the Jets.

=== Detroit Lions ===
On August 25, 2026, Hartwig was signed by the Detroit Lions. On August 30, he was waived as part of final roster cuts.

=== Atlanta Falcons ===
On November 10, 2026, Hartwig was signed to the Atlanta Falcons practice squad.
