= Jeffrey M'Ba =

Gabonese gridiron football player (born 1999)

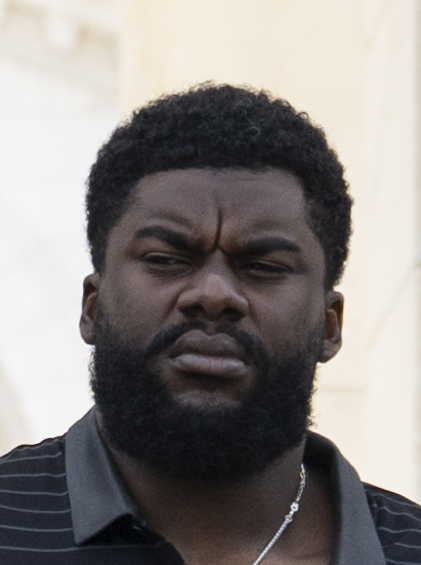
- M'Ba in 2026

No. 60 – Detroit Lions
- Position: Nose tackle
- Roster status: Practice squad

Personal information
- Born: September 14, 1999 (age 27); Libreville, Gabon
- Listed height: 6 ft 6 in (1.98 m)
- Listed weight: 312 lb (142 kg)

Career information
- High school: Saint Frances (Baltimore)
- College: Independence (2020–2021); Auburn (2022); Purdue (2023–2024); SMU (2025)
- NFL draft: 2026: undrafted
- CFL draft: 2026G: 2nd round, 12th overall pick

Career history
- Washington Commanders (2026)*; Detroit Lions (2026–present)*
- * Offseason or practice squad member only
- Stats at Pro Football Reference

Jeffrey M'Ba (born September 14, 1999) is a Gabonese professional football nose tackle for the Detroit Lions of the National Football League (NFL). M'Ba played college football for the Auburn Tigers, Purdue Boilermakers, and SMU Mustangs. M'Ba signed with the Washington Commanders as an undrafted free agent following the 2026 NFL draft.

== Early life ==
M'Ba was born in Libreville, Gabon, and grew up in France and Cameroon. After moving to the United States, he attended Saint Frances Academy in Baltimore, Maryland for his senior year. Coming out of high school, he was rated as a four-star recruit and committed to play college football for the Virginia Cavaliers over offers from other schools such as Oregon, Ohio State, Tennessee, Michigan, Penn State, North Carolina, West Virginia, Florida, and Florida State. However, M'Ba later de-committed and enroll to play at Independence Community College due to academic transcript issues.

== College career ==
=== Independence CC ===
M'Ba spent two seasons at Independence Community College from 2020 through 2021, where he finished as the top overall JUCO recruit.

=== Auburn ===
M'Ba transferred to play for the Auburn Tigers. In his lone season at Auburn in 2022, he played in six games, totaling seven tackles, a sack, and a forced fumble. After the season, M'Ba entered the NCAA transfer portal.

=== Purdue ===
M'Ba transferred to play for the Purdue Boilermakers. In 2023, he totaled 16 tackles with two being for a loss and a sack. In 2024, M'Ba played in all 12 games, notching 30 tackles. After the season he once again entered the transfer portal.

=== SMU ===
M'Ba transferred to play for the SMU Mustangs.

== Professional career ==
Pre-draft measurables
| Height | Weight | Arm length | Hand span | Wingspan | 40-yard dash | 10-yard split | 20-yard split | 20-yard shuttle | Three-cone drill | Broad jump | Bench press |
|---|---|---|---|---|---|---|---|---|---|---|---|
| 6 ft 5 in (1.96 m) | 310 lb (141 kg) | 33 7/8 in (0.86 m) | 10 5/8 in (0.27 m) | 6 ft 8 in (2.03 m) | 5.15 s | 1.82 s | 2.94 s | 4.88 s | 8.06 s | 8 ft 8 in (2.64 m) | 22 reps |
All values from Pro Day

=== Washington Commanders ===
M'Ba was drafted in the second round, 12th overall, by the Edmonton Elks in the 2026 CFL global draft but signed with the Washington Commanders of the National Football League (NFL) as an undrafted free agent on May 7, 2026. He was released by the Commanders as a part of final roster cuts on August 30. M'Ba was re–signed to Washington's practice squad the following day. He was released from the practice squad on October 7, 2026.

=== Detroit Lions ===
On October 8, 2026, M'Ba was signed to the Detroit Lions practice squad.
