= Kiero Small =

American football player and coach (born 1989)

Purdue Boilermakers
- Title: Director of strength and conditioning

Personal information
- Born: May 1, 1989 (age 37); Baltimore, Maryland, U.S.
- Listed height: 5 ft 8 in (1.73 m)
- Listed weight: 244 lb (111 kg)

Career information
- High school: Cardinal Gibbons (MD)
- College: Arkansas
- NFL draft: 2014: 7th round, 227th overall pick

Career history

Playing
- Seattle Seahawks (2014)*; Cleveland Browns (2014); Baltimore Ravens (2014–2015)*
- * Offseason or practice squad member only

Coaching
- Michigan (2021–2022) Assistant strength and conditioning coach; Purdue (2023–present) Director of strength and conditioning
- Stats at Pro Football Reference

Kiero Small (born May 1, 1989) is an American college football coach and former fullback. He is the director of strength and conditioning for Purdue University, a position he has held since 2023. He was selected by the Seattle Seahawks in the seventh round of the 2014 NFL draft. He played college football at Arkansas.

== College career ==
Small played his freshman and sophomore seasons at Hartnell College, a junior college in Salinas, California. He signed with the University of Arkansas in 2011 as an inside linebacker, but was moved to offense and converted to a fullback prior to his junior season with the Razorbacks. Arkansas finished 2011 ranked #5 in the final polls with an 11–2 record after beating Kansas State in the 2012 Cotton Bowl Classic. Small suffered an injury early in his 2012 senior campaign and was forced to redshirt. As a redshirt senior in 2013, Small played a significant role in Bret Bielema's first season as a devastating blocking back, as well as a receiver out of the backfield, scoring 3 rushing touchdowns and 1 receiving for the season.

== Professional career ==
=== Seattle Seahawks ===
Small was selected by the Seattle Seahawks in the seventh round with the 227th overall pick of the 2014 NFL draft. His contract with the Seahawks was terminated on August 30, 2014.

=== Cleveland Browns ===
Small was signed to the Cleveland Browns practice squad on September 2, 2014. He was waived by the Browns on November 11.

=== Baltimore Ravens ===
On November 13, 2014, he signed with the Baltimore Ravens practice squad. On September 5, 2015, he was released by the Ravens as part of final roster cuts.
