= Brick Haley =

American football player and coach (born 1966)

Biographical details
- Born: May 16, 1966 (age 60); Gadsden, Alabama

Playing career
- 1984–1988: Alabama A&M
- Position: Linebacker

Coaching career (HC unless noted)
- 1989: Enterprise HS (AL) (assistant)
- 1990: Arkansas (GA)
- 1991–1993: Austin Peay (DL)
- 1994–1996: Troy State (DL)
- 1997: Houston (OLB)
- 1998: Clemson (OLB)
- 1999–2001: Baylor (DC/LB)
- 2002–2003: Georgia Tech (LB)
- 2004–2006: Mississippi State (DL)
- 2007–2009: Chicago Bears (DL)
- 2009–2014: LSU (DL)
- 2015–2016: Texas (DL)
- 2017–2020: Missouri (DL)
- 2022: Minnesota (DL)
- 2023–2024: Purdue (DL)

Brick Haley (born May 16, 1966) is an American football coach and former player.

== Coaching career ==
=== Early career ===
Previously, Haley was the defensive coordinator and linebackers coach at Baylor (1999–2001) after coaching outside linebackers for one season each at Clemson University (1998), and at Houston (1997). The defensive line coach at Troy State from 1994 to 1996, he was promoted to defensive coordinator following the 1996 campaign before leaving for Houston. Haley coached the defensive line at Austin Peay from 1991 to 1993 after starting his college coaching career as a graduate assistant at Arkansas in 1990. His first coaching job was at Enterprise (Ala.) High School in 1989.

=== Georgia Tech ===
After leaving Baylor as a defensive coordinator, Haley spent two years (2002–2003) as Georgia Tech's linebackers coach where he helped the Yellow Jackets to a pair of postseason bowl games. In 2003, he coached a first-team all-ACC performer, after Tech's trio of starting linebackers finished the 2002 season as the team's top-three tacklers.

=== Mississippi State ===
Prior to his stint in the NFL, Haley spent three years as the defensive line coach at Mississippi State from 2004 to 2006. At Mississippi State, Haley helped improve a Bulldogs defense that finished 41st in the nation in 2006 after finishing 113th a year before his arrival. Under Haley's watch, Bulldogs defensive end Titus Brown developed into a second-team all-SEC selection after leading the team and ranking fifth in the conference in sacks in 2006. In 2005, Haley coached the SEC leader in sacks (third in NCAA) and tackles for loss (fourth in NCAA) in Willie Evans.

=== Chicago Bears ===
Haley was the defensive line coach of the Chicago Bears of the NFL. In two years in the NFL with the Bears, Haley coached a defensive line that helped Chicago rank No. 5 in the league in rushing yards allowed per game in 2008. The Bears finished sixth in the NFL in sacks in 2007 with defensive tackle Tommie Harris earning a spot in the Pro Bowl that year.

== Personal life ==
The Gadsden, Ala., native played linebacker at Alabama A&M from 1984 to 1988 and was inducted into the school's Athletic Hall of Fame in 2005. He received Alabama A&M's Inspiration Award in 1987, and was named football MVP for the 1988 season. He and his wife, Tina, have three sons: Adrian, A.J. and Jeremy.
