= Kumara (surname) =

Kumara is a surname. Notable people with the surname include:

- Ajith Kumara (born 1973), Sri Lankan politician
- Dinesh Kumara (born 1983), Sri Lankan cricketer
- Malith Kumara (born 1989), Sri Lankan cricketer
- Manjula Kumara (born 1984), Sri Lankan high jumper
- Pradeep Kumara (born 1972), Sri Lankan cricketer
- Prasad Kumara (born 1978), Sri Lankan cricketer
- Rohan Pradeep Kumara (born 1975), Sri Lankan athlete
- Vincent Kumara, Papua New Guinean politician
- Yoshan Kumara (born 1990), Sri Lankan cricketer

== See also ==
- Kamara (surname)
- Komara (surname)
