= Kamara (surname) =

Kamara is an African surname that is most common in Sierra Leone. It may refer to the following notable people:

- Aboubakar Kamara (born 1995), French-Mauritanian football striker
- Abubakar Kamara (born 1970), Sierra Leonean football player
- Abu Bakar Kamara (born 1929), Sierra Leonean politician
- Alhaji Kamara (born 1994), Sierra Leonean football player
- Alpha B. Kamara (born 1978), Sierra Leonean sprinter
- Amara Kamara (born 1988), American college football player
- Alvin Kamara (born 1995), American football running back
- Azur Kamara (born 1996), American football player
- Bingourou Kamara (born 1996), French football goalkeeper
- Boima Kamara, Liberian politician
- Boubacar Kamara (born 1999), French footballer
- Brima Kamara (disambiguation), multiple people
- Chris Kamara (born 1957), English footballer and commentator
- Dauda Kamara, Sierra Leonean politician
- Diomansy Kamara (born 1980), Senegalese football player
- Glen Kamara (born 1995), Finnish footballer
- Hassane Kamara (born 1994), French-born football midfielder
- Ibrahim Bobson Kamara (born 1975), Sierra Leonean football player
- Ibrahim Kamara (born 1966) Ivorian football manager
- Ib Kamara (born 1990) Sierra Leonean British-based fashion stylist and journalist
- János Kamara (1927–2000), Hungarian communist politician
- John Kamara (born 1988), Sierra Leonean football player
- Kei Kamara (born 1984), Sierra Leonean footballer
- Kisimi Kamara (1890–1962), Sierra Leonean village tailor
- Kunti Kamara (born 1974), Liberian rebel commander
- Lansana Kamara (born 1992), Sierra Leonean footballer
- Lusinee Kamara, Liberian politician
- Malvin Kamara (born 1983), English-born footballer
- Mariam Kamara (born 1979), Nigerien architect
- Mariatu Kamara (born 1986), Sierra Leonean writer
- Marjon Kamara (born 1949), Liberian diplomat and politician
- Masire Kamara, Sierra Leonean tea seller
- Mikail Kamara (born 2001), American football player
- Mohamed Kamara (disambiguation), multiple people
- Musa Noah Kamara (born 2000), Sierra Leonean football player
- Odel Kamara (born 2003), English boxer
- Ola Kamara (born 1989), Norwegian football player
- Osman Kamara (born 1987), Sierra Leonean swimmer
- Paul Kamara (born 1956), Sierra Leonean journalist, football manager, and cabinet minister
- Salamatu Kamara, Sierra Leonean educator, politician and women's rights activist
- Sam Kamara (born 1997), American football player
- Samura Kamara, Sierra Leonean politician and economist
- Sheik I. Kamara, Sierra Leonean politician
- Sheku Kamara (born 1987), English-born footballer, imprisoned for armed robbery
- Tibou Kamara, Guinean politician and journalist

== See also ==
- Camara (surname)
- Komara (surname)
- Kumara (surname)
