= Komara (surname) =

Komara is a surname. Notable people with the surname include:

- Kabiné Komara (born 1950), Prime Minister of Guinea
- Siré Komara (born 1991), Guinean writer
- Tomáš Komara (born 1994), Slovak footballer
- Yacouba Komara (born 1971), Ivorian footballer

== See also ==
- Kamara (surname)
- Kumara (surname)
