= Masire =

Masire may refer to the following people

Given name

- Masire Kamara, Sierra Leone celebrity and tea seller

Surname

- Gladys Olebile Masire (1932–2013), teacher and political figure from Botswana, wife of Quett Masire
- Quett Masire (1925–2017), second President of Botswana
- Tebogo Masire, commander of the Botswana Defence Force
