= Malith =

Malith is a given name. Notable people with the name include:

- Malith Cooray (born 1990), Sri Lankan cricketer
- Malith Gunathilake (born 1987), Sri Lankan cricketer
- Malith Jayathilake, Sri Lankan politician
- Malith Kumara (born 1989), Sri Lankan cricketer
- Malith Premathilake (born 1997), Sri Lankan cricketer
- Malith de Silva (cricketer, born 1992), Sri Lankan cricketer
- Malith de Silva (cricketer, born 1995), Sri Lankan cricketer
