= Camara (surname) =

Camara, Câmara, Cámara, Camará is a surname. Notable people with the surname include:

== Basketball players ==
- Babacar Camara (born 1981), Senegalese basketball player
- Gora Camara (born 2001), Senegalese basketball player
- Ousmane Camara (born 1989), French basketball player
- Toumani Camara (born 2000), Belgian basketball player

== Footballers ==
- Abdoulaye Camara, multiple people
- Aboubacar M'Baye Camara (born 1985), Guinean footballer
- Fredson Camara Pereira (born 1981), Brazilian footballer
- Hassoun Camara (born 1986), French footballer
- Henri Camara (born 1977), Senegalese footballer
- Ibrahima Sory Camara (born 1985), Guinean footballer
- Kader Camara (born 1982), Guinean footballer
- Kémoko Camara (born 1975), Guinean footballer
- Mamadi Camara (soccer, born 1995), Guinean footballer
- Mamadi Camará (footballer, born 2003), Bissau-Guinean footballer
- Mangué Camara (born 1982), Guinean footballer
- Mohamed Ali Camara (born 1997), Guinean footballer
- Mohamed Mady Camara (born 1997), Guinean footballer
- Mohammed Camara (born 1975), Guinean footballer
- Oumar Camara (born 1992), French footballer
- Papa Camara (1951–2018), Guinean footballer and manager
- Sékou Camara (footballer, born 1985) (1985–2013), Malian footballer
- Souleymane Camara (born 1982), Senegalese footballer
- Titi Camara (born 1972), Guinean footballer
- Zoumana Camara (born 1979), French footballer

== Others ==
- Assan Musa Camara (1923–2013), Gambian politician
- Fatou Kiné Camara (born 1964), Senegalese lawyer and women's rights campaigner
- Gabriela Cámara, Mexican chef
- Hélder Câmara (1909–1999), Roman Catholic Archbishop
- Javier Cámara (born 1967), Spanish actor
- Jessica Camara (born 1988), Canadian boxer
- Marine Camara (born 1995), Malian boxer
- Juan de la Cámara (1525–1602), Spanish Conquistador
- Juan Rodríguez de la Cámara (1390–1450), Spanish poet
- Camara Laye (1928–1980), Guinean writer (this is a Mandinka name; the family name is Camara and precedes the given names)
- Manuel de la Cámara (1835–1920), Spanish admiral
- Mariama Camara (died 2025), Guinean politician and businesswoman
- Moussa Dadis Camara (born 1964), Guinean army officer and president
- Rafael Câmara (born 2005), Brazilian racing driver
- Sadio Camara (1979–2026), Malian military officer and politician
- Sérgio Sette Câmara (born 1998), Brazilian racing driver
- Seyni Awa Camara (1945–2026), Senegalese sculptor

== See also ==
- Kamara (surname)

Cámara is also an object
