= Elhadj Baila Ly =

Guinean politician

Deputy in the National Assembly (Guinea)
- President: Alpha Conde
- Succeeded by: Tibou Kamara
- Constituency: Dinguiraye

Personal details
- Party: Rally of the Guinean People
- Committees: Mines & Industry

Elhadj Baila Ly is a Guinean politician who represents the constituency of Dinguiraye, in the National Assembly (Guinea). He is a member of the Majority Rally of the Guinean People Party of former president Alpha Conde.
