= Riley Nowakowski =

American football player (born 2002)

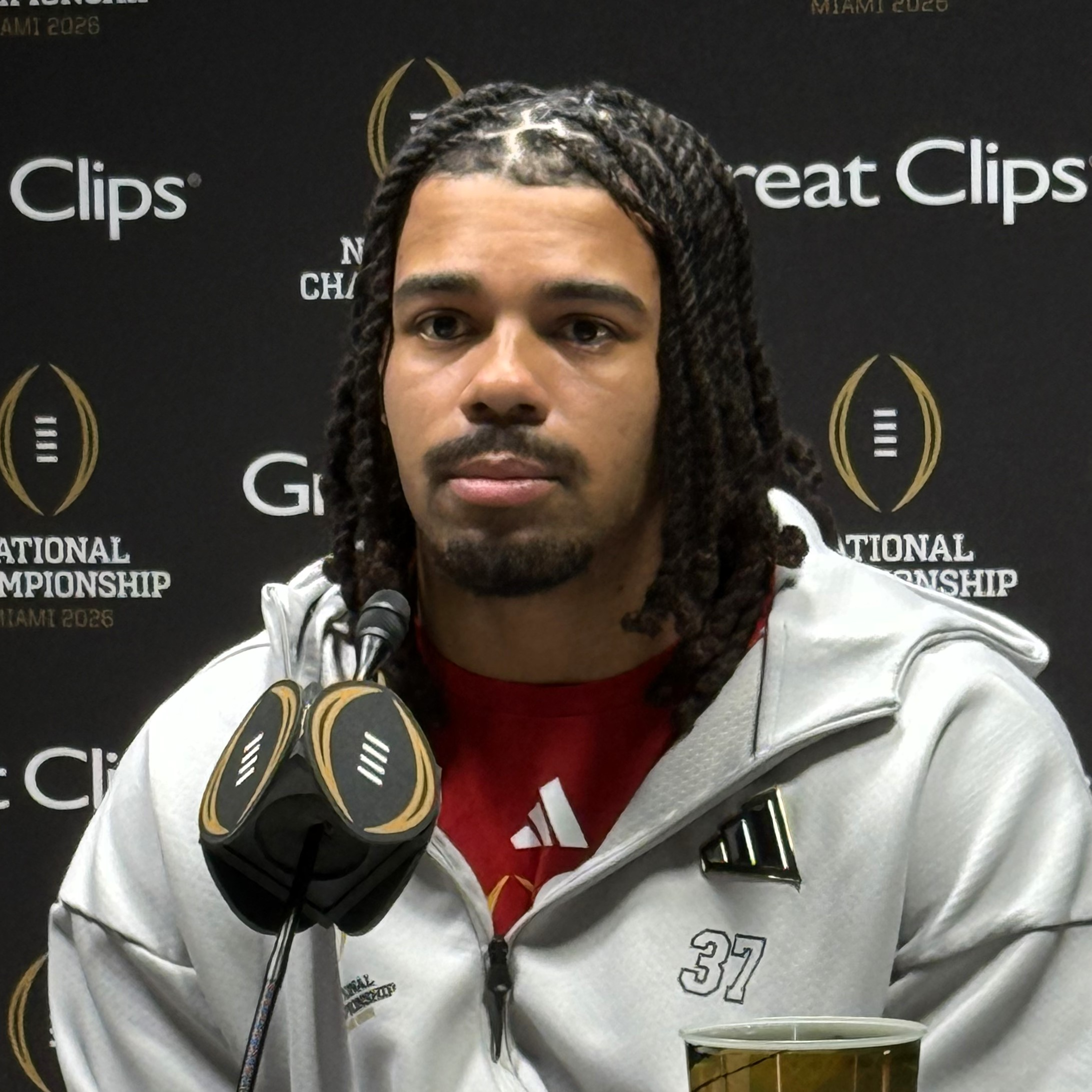
- Nowakowski in 2026

No. 37 – Pittsburgh Steelers
- Position: Fullback
- Roster status: Active

Personal information
- Born: June 30, 2002 (age 24); Milwaukee, Wisconsin, U.S.
- Listed height: 6 ft 2 in (1.88 m)
- Listed weight: 250 lb (113 kg)

Career information
- High school: Marquette (Milwaukee)
- College: Wisconsin (2020–2024); Indiana (2025)
- NFL draft: 2026: 5th round, 169th overall pick

Career history
- Pittsburgh Steelers (2026–present)

Awards and highlights
- CFP national champion (2025); Second-team All-Big Ten (2025)
- Stats at Pro Football Reference

Riley Nowakowski (born June 30, 2002) is an American professional football fullback for the Pittsburgh Steelers of the National Football League (NFL). He played college football for the Wisconsin Badgers from 2020 to 2024 before transferring to the Indiana Hoosiers in 2025 where his team won the 2026 College Football Playoff National Championship. Nowakowski was selected by the Steelers in the fifth round of the 2026 NFL draft.

== Early life ==
Nowakowski attended Marquette University High School in Milwaukee, Wisconsin, where he played football as a linebacker and running back. He was named first-team all-state as a senior and earned the John Anderson Award, given to the best senior linebacker in the state of Wisconsin. Nowakowski also competed in track and field and basketball in high school.

== College career ==
Nowakowski began his college career as a walk-on player for the Wisconsin Badgers and redshirted the 2020 season after appearing in four games at linebacker, recording one tackle. He played in two games in 2021, including in the 2021 Las Vegas Bowl against the Arizona State Sun Devils. He appeared in 13 games in 2022, converting to fullback and playing special teams. In 2023, he converted to tight end, primarily in a run-blocking role, as Wisconsin's new head coach Luke Fickell and offensive coordinator Phil Longo eliminated the team's fullback position. He was also awarded a scholarship. After missing the beginning of the season due to a foot injury, he played in nine games, including his first career start against the Ohio State Buckeyes, recording seven receptions for 57 yards; Nowakowski also scored his first career touchdown against the Minnesota Golden Gophers. Nowakowski was named a team captain in 2024 and played in all 12 games, with nine starts, recording 11 receptions for 74 yards. He earned Academic All-Big Ten honors in each season from 2021 to 2024 at Wisconsin.

Nowakowski transferred to play his final season of NCAA eligibility for the Indiana Hoosiers for the 2025 season, filling a role vacated by Zach Horton, who graduated after 2024. He earned the team's starting tight end role and served as one of the team's rotating game-day captains in six games. Nowakowski scored his first touchdown with Indiana on a one-yard rush in a 56–9 win over the Kennesaw State Owls and made critical blocks on multiple other touchdowns in the game; head coach Curt Cignetti awarded Nowakowski the game ball for his performance, recognizing him as the team's offensive player of the game. In a victory against his former team, the Wisconsin Badgers, Nowakowski scored a touchdown on a 21-yard reception from quarterback Fernando Mendoza. In Indiana's 2026 College Football Playoff National Championship win against the Miami Hurricanes, Nowakowski scored the first touchdown of the game on a one-yard rush. Nowakowski was named second-team All-Big Ten for the 2025 season.

=== Statistics ===
Season	Team	Games		Receiving			
Season	Team	GP	GS	Rec	Yds	Avg	TD
2020	Wisconsin	4	0	Did not record statistics			
2021	Wisconsin	2	0	Did not record statistics			
2022	Wisconsin	13	0	Did not record statistics			
2023	Wisconsin	9	1	7	57	8.1	1
2024	Wisconsin	12	9	11	74	6.7	0
2025	Indiana	16	16	32	387	12.1	2
Career		56	26	50	518	10.4	3

== Professional career ==
Pre-draft measurables
Height	Weight	Arm length	Hand span	Wingspan	40-yard dash	10-yard split	20-yard split	20-yard shuttle	Three-cone drill	Vertical jump	Broad jump
6 ft 2 1/4 in (1.89 m)	250 lb (113 kg)	31 1/2 in (0.80 m)	8 3/4 in (0.22 m)	6 ft 5 1/4 in (1.96 m)	4.66 s	1.70 s	2.75 s	4.61 s	7.43 s	33.5 in (0.85 m)	9 ft 11 in (3.02 m)
All values from NFL Combine/Pro Day

Nowakowski was selected by the Pittsburgh Steelers in the fifth round (169th overall) of the 2026 NFL draft.
