= 2026 College Football Playoff National Championship =

College football championship

2026 College Football Playoff National Championship presented by AT&T
- 12th College Football Playoff National Championship
Miami Hurricanes	Indiana Hoosiers
(13–2)	(15–0)
ACC	Big Ten
21	27
Head coach: Mario Cristobal	Head coach: Curt Cignetti
AP / Coaches / CFP; 10 / 10 / 10	AP / Coaches / CFP; 1 / 1 / 1
	1	2	3	4	Total
Miami	0	0	7	14	21
Indiana	3	7	7	10	27
- Date: January 19, 2026
- Season: 2025
- Stadium: Hard Rock Stadium
- Location: Miami Gardens, Florida
- Players of the Game: Fernando Mendoza (Indiana, QB); Mikail Kamara (Indiana, DE)
- Favorite: Indiana by 8.5
- National anthem: Jamal Roberts
- Referee: Michael VanderVelde (Big 12)
- Attendance: 67,227

United States TV coverage
- Network: ESPN
- Announcers: Chris Fowler (play-by-play), Kirk Herbstreit (analyst), Holly Rowe and Molly McGrath (sidelines)
- Nielsen ratings: 30.1 million viewers

International TV coverage
- Network: ESPN Deportes; Brazil: ESPN Brazil/Disney+
- Announcers: ESPN Deportes: Eduardo Varela (play-by-play), Pablo Viruega (analyst), Katia Castorena and Ciro Procuna (sidelines); ESPN Brazil: Fernando Nardini (play-by-play), Weinny Eirado (analyst), Deivis Chiodini (analyst), and Giane Pessoa (rules analyst)

The 2026 College Football Playoff National Championship (officially known as the 2026 College Football Playoff National Championship presented by AT&T for sponsorship reasons) was a college football bowl game played on January 19, 2026, at Hard Rock Stadium in Miami Gardens, Florida, United States. It was the 12th College Football Playoff National Championship and determined the national champion of the NCAA Division I Football Bowl Subdivision (FBS) for the 2025 season. It was the final game of the 2025–26 College Football Playoff (CFP) and the culminating game of the 2025–26 bowl season. The game began at approximately 7:30 p.m. EST and was televised nationally by ESPN.

The game featured the No. 1 Indiana Hoosiers of the Big Ten Conference and the No. 10 Miami Hurricanes of the Atlantic Coast Conference (ACC). It was the teams' third meeting and their first since 1966. Miami entered seeking their sixth national championship, and Indiana seeking its first. The Hoosiers entered as Big Ten champions with a 15–0 record, while Miami entered with a 13–2 record.

Indiana placekicker Nico Radicic opened the scoring with a 34-yard field goal late in the first quarter. Three drives ending with a punt preceded it, and three more followed before Indiana scored on a touchdown rush by Riley Nowakowski to cap a 14-play drive with six minutes until halftime. Miami reached the Indiana 32-yard line with 33 seconds remaining but missed a 50-yard field goal and Indiana took a 10–0 lead to half. On Miami's second play of the second half, running back Mark Fletcher Jr. rushed for a 57-yard touchdown to bring Miami within three points. Both teams punted twice afterwards, but Miami's second punt was blocked by Mikail Kamara and recovered in the end zone for an Indiana touchdown by Isaiah Jones. The teams traded scoring drives for much of the remainder of the game: Miami scored on a Fletcher rush and a pass from Carson Beck to Malachi Toney, and Indiana scored on a rush by quarterback Fernando Mendoza and a field goal by Radicic. Trailing by six points with 44 seconds remaining, Beck's pass was intercepted by Indiana defensive back Jamari Sharpe, sealing a 27–21 win for Indiana, winning the Hoosiers their first football national championship in school history. This was the third straight national championship won by the Big Ten Conference.

== Background ==
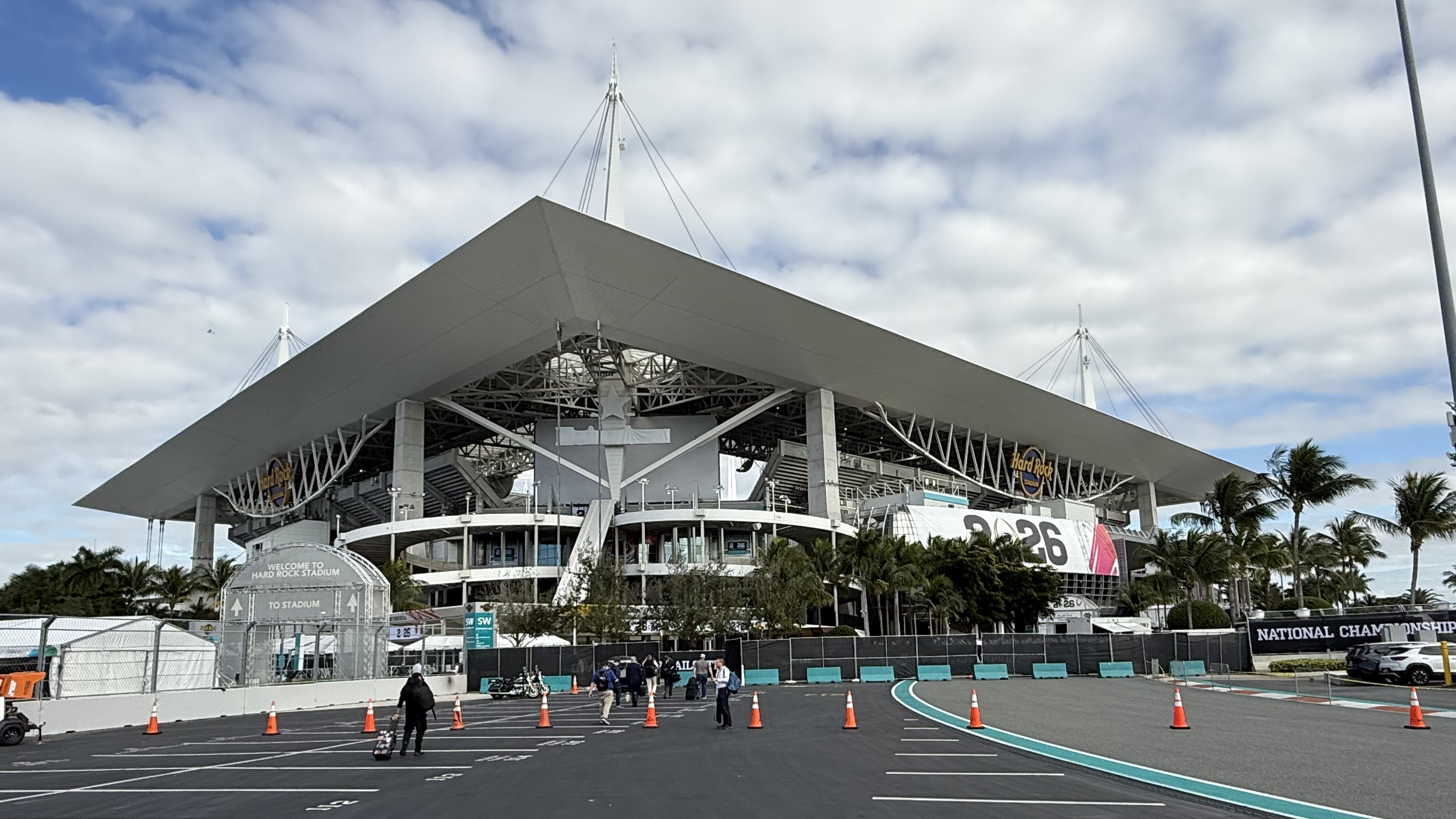
Hard Rock Stadium in Miami Gardens, Florida, the site of the College Football Playoff National Championship.

=== Host venue ===
On August 15, 2022, the College Football Playoff (CFP) awarded the rights to host the 2026 championship to Hard Rock Stadium. As Hard Rock Stadium hosted the 2021 CFP National Championship, the 2026 game made Miami Gardens the second city to host the CFP national championship twice, after Atlanta, which hosted the championship game in 2018 and 2025.

The stadium is the regular host of the Miami Dolphins of the National Football League (NFL), the Miami Hurricanes football team, and the Orange Bowl. In qualifying for this game, the Hurricanes became the first team to play for the modern college football national championship at its own stadium. Because Indiana was the higher seed, Miami was the designated visiting team for the game. In addition, the stadium hosted four BCS National Championship Games (2001, 2005, 2009, and 2013).

Hard Rock Stadium arranged for the game
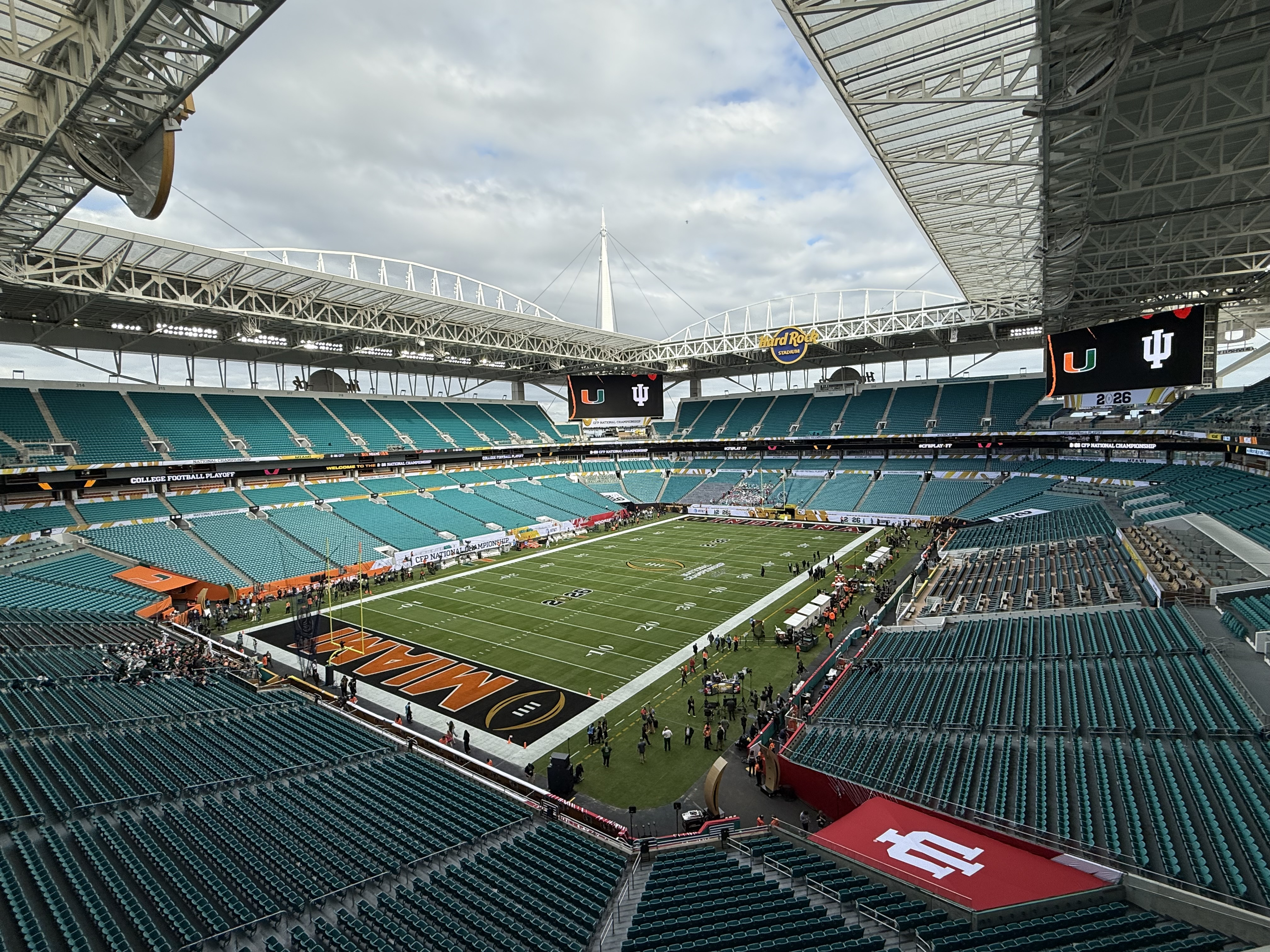
Press box view

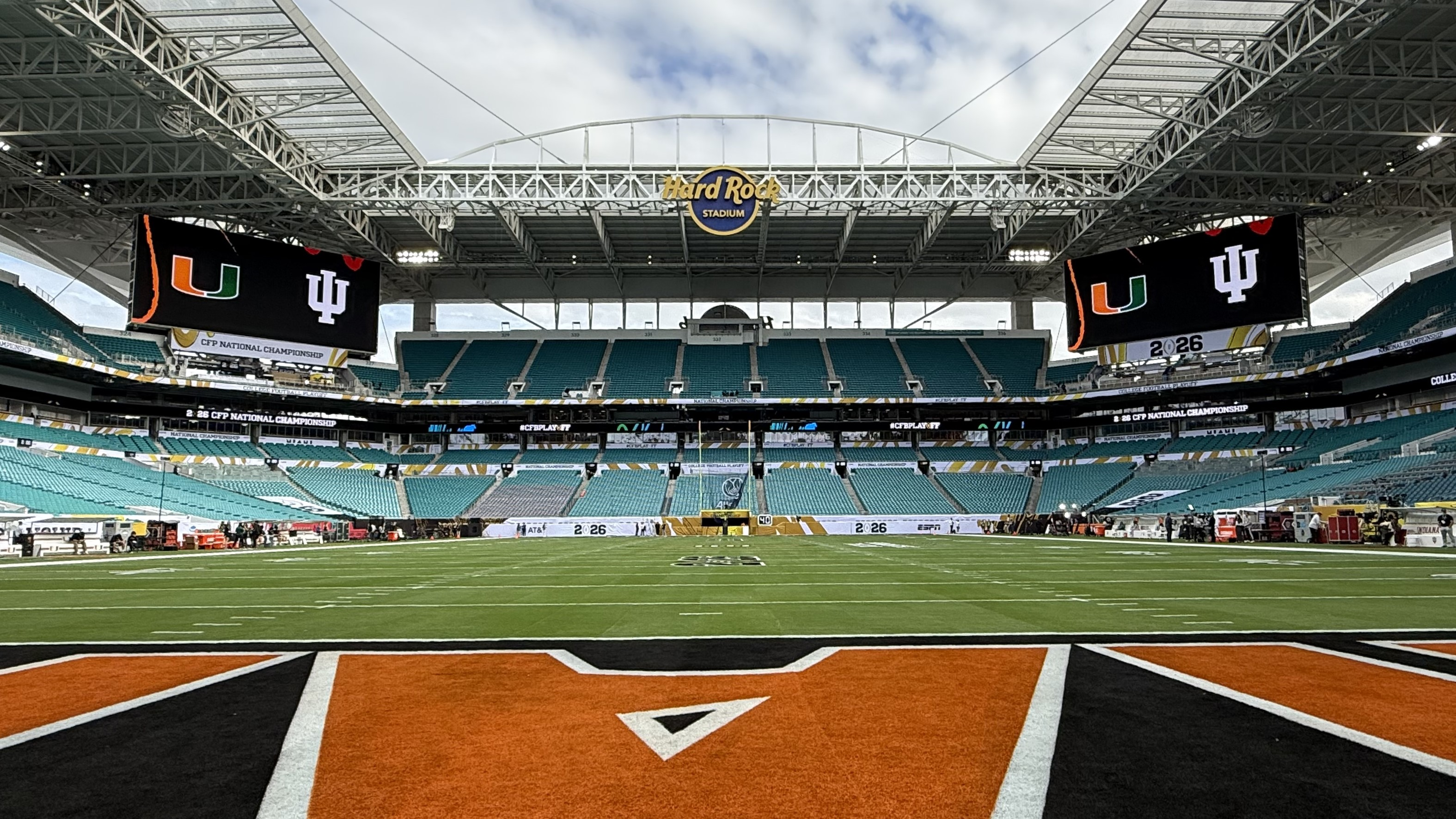
West end zone view

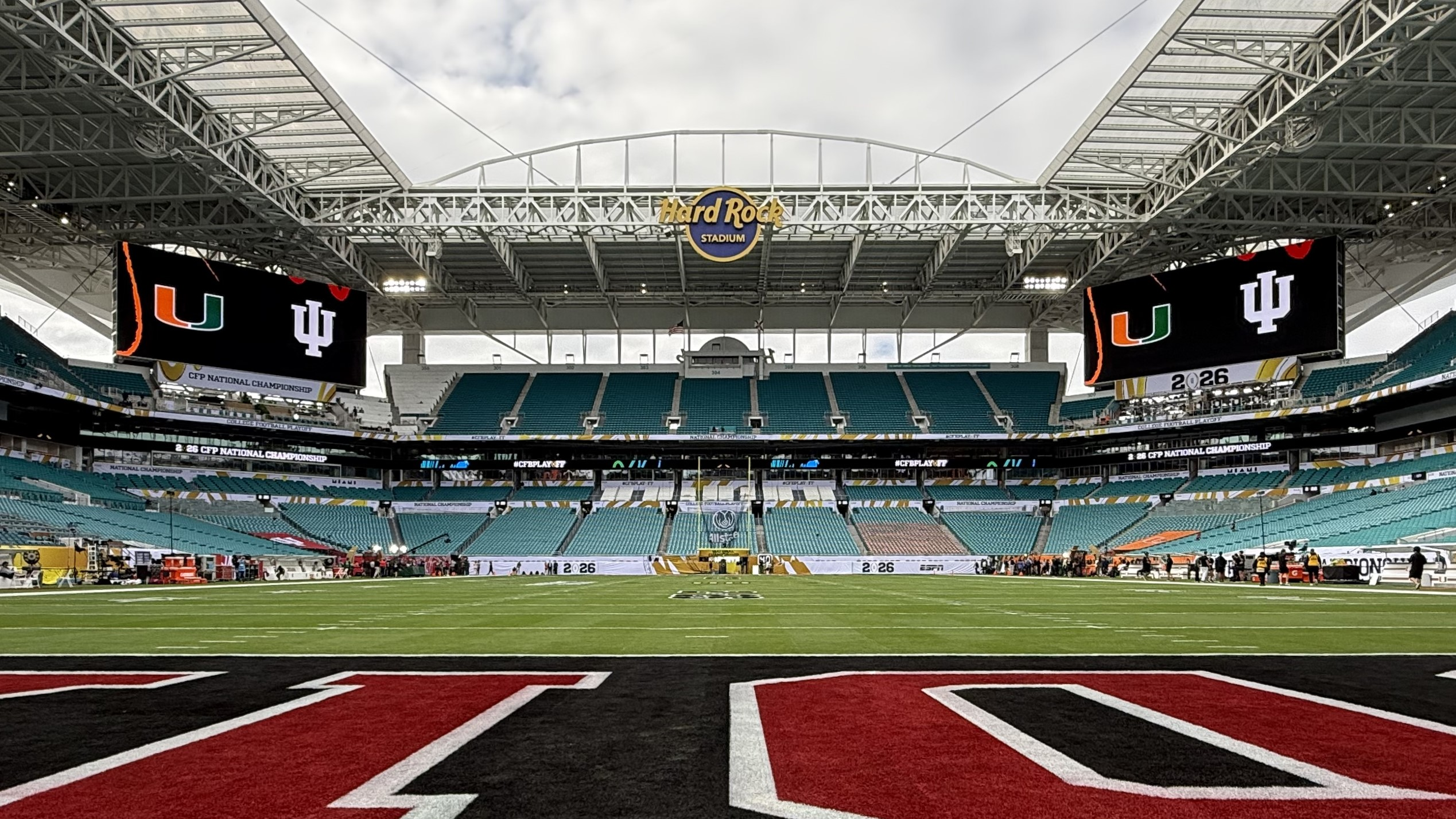
East end zone view

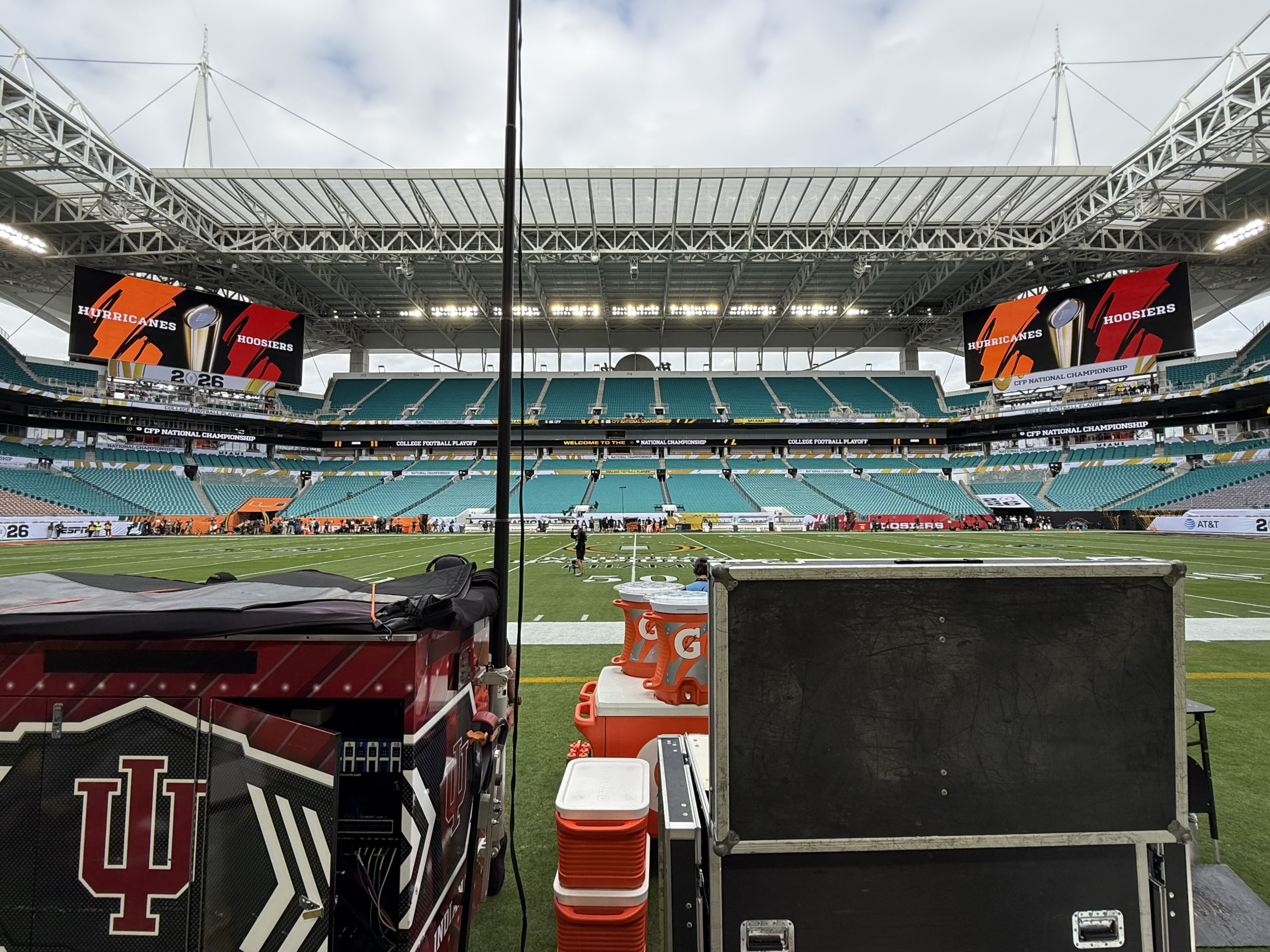
Indiana sideline view

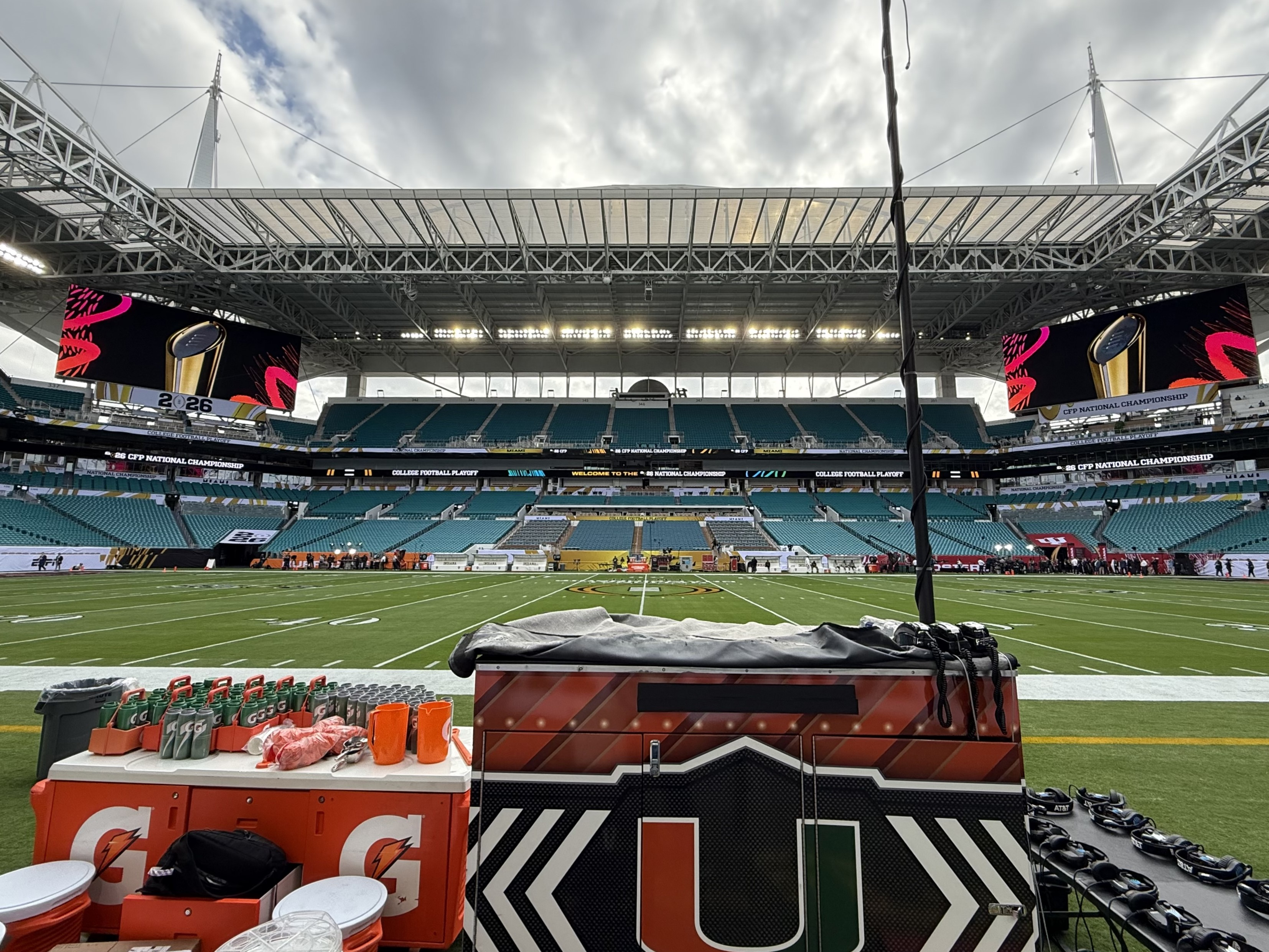
Miami sideline view
Photos taken pre-game

== Teams ==
The championship game featured the Miami Hurricanes of the Atlantic Coast Conference (ACC) and the Indiana Hoosiers of the Big Ten Conference. Miami qualified by winning the Fiesta Bowl semifinal, while Indiana won the Peach Bowl semifinal to reach the championship. This was the teams' third meeting; Indiana won, 28–14, in 1964, and Miami won, 14–7, in 1966. Both prior games were also played in Miami.

Miami entered seeking their sixth national championship and their first since 2001, when they defeated Nebraska in the Rose Bowl; their last championship game appearance was the 2003 Fiesta Bowl against Ohio State. Indiana played for their first championship. The game marked the third consecutive championship without a representative from the Southeastern Conference (SEC), the longest such streak since a four-year span from 1999 to 2002.

=== Miami Hurricanes ===
Miami opened the season by winning their first five games for the second consecutive year. This stretch included victories against three ranked teams: No. 6 Notre Dame in the season opener, No. 18 South Florida, and No. 18 Florida State. They rose to No. 2 in the AP poll but lost two of their following three games to Louisville by three points and to SMU by six points in overtime. As a result, the Hurricanes dropped to No. 18 in the AP poll and were similarly ranked No. 18 in the first CFP poll of the season. They closed the regular season with four consecutive wins to finish with a 10–2 overall record and a 6–2 record in ACC play. They finished in a five-way tie for second place in the ACC standings but missed the ACC championship on a tiebreaker.

The Hurricanes earned the last at-large spot as the No. 10 seed in the College Football Playoff. In their first-round game, Miami defeated No. 7 Texas A&M, 10–3, at Kyle Field. In the quarterfinal round, the Hurricanes upset defending national champion Ohio State, 24–14, in the Cotton Bowl Classic. They advanced to the Fiesta Bowl semifinal against Ole Miss, where the Hurricanes won, 31–27. Miami entered the championship game with a 13–2 record. As the result of a targeting penalty during the second half of the semifinal, defensive back Xavier Lucas was suspended for the first half of the championship game.

Miami head coach Mario Cristobal entered the game with a 35–18 record through four seasons in the position.

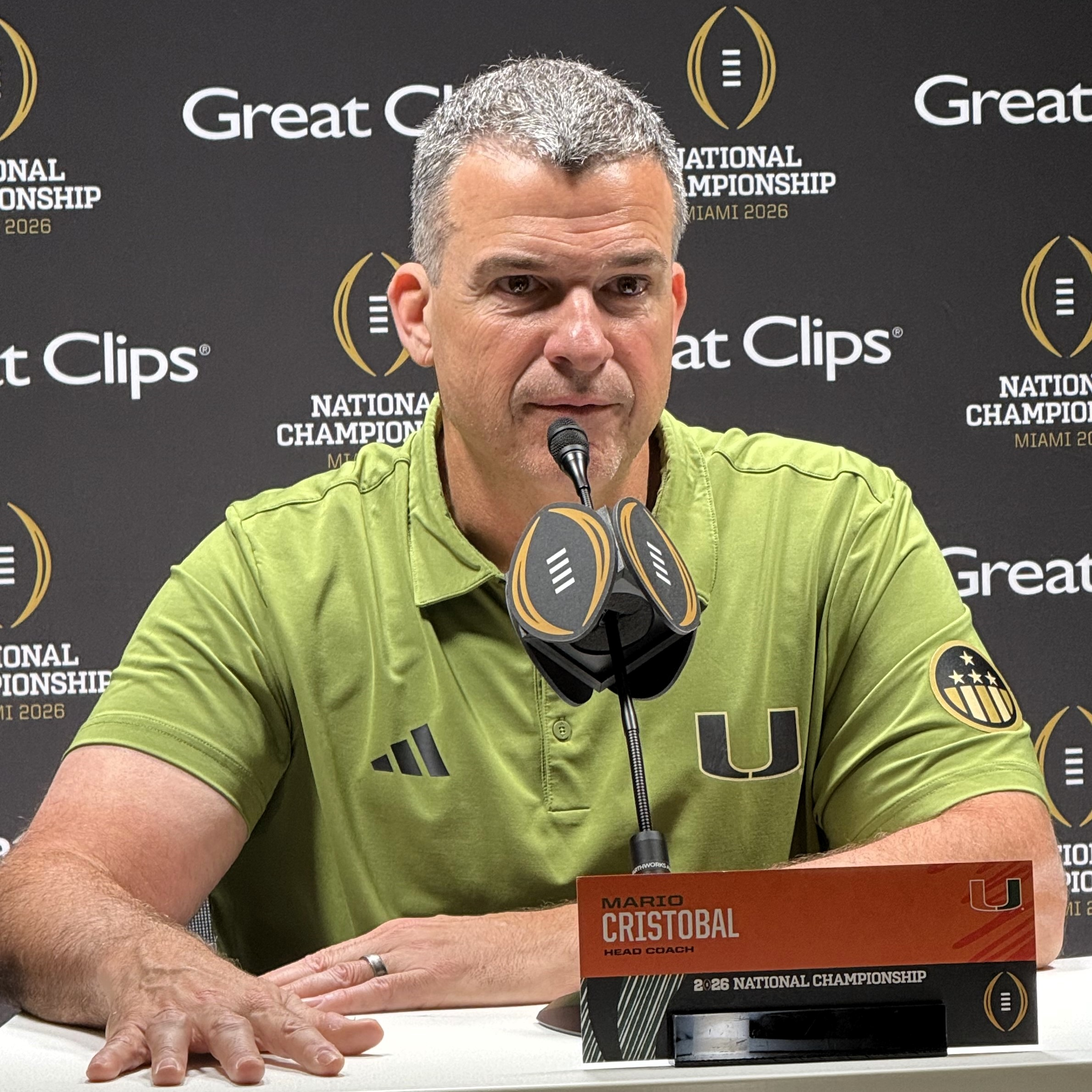
Miami head coach Mario Cristobal

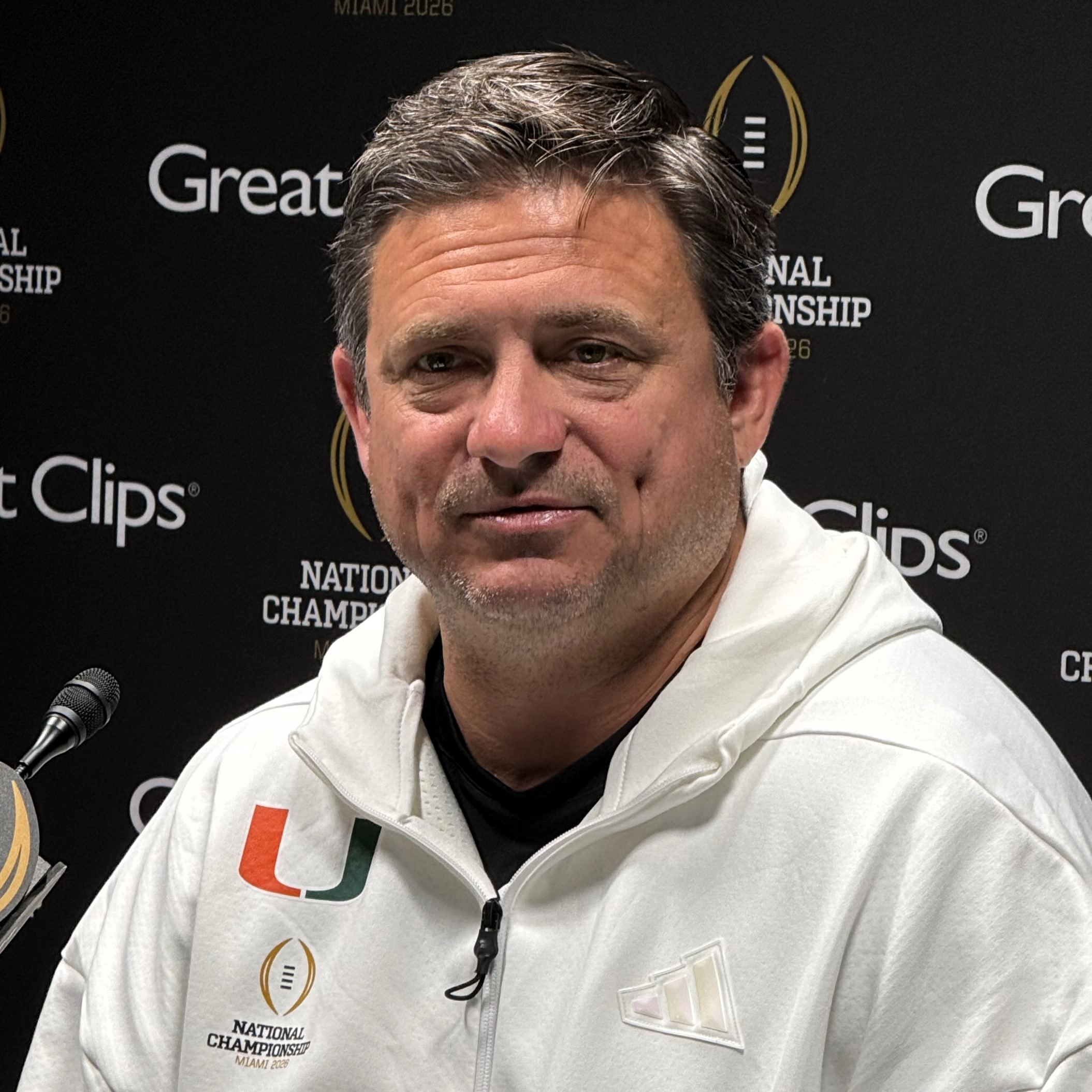
Miami offensive coordinator Shannon Dawson

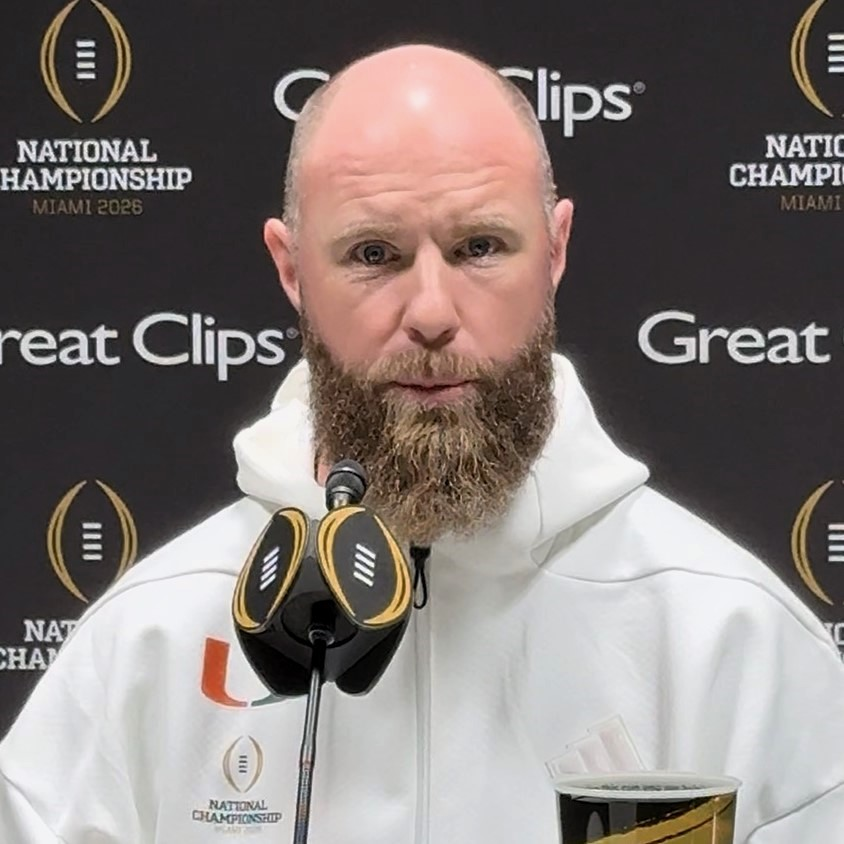
Miami defensive coordinator Corey Hetherman
Photos from CFP Media Day.

=== Indiana Hoosiers ===
The 2025 season included numerous firsts for Indiana football, which entered the season with the most all-time losses by an FBS program. (Note: Before the season, Indiana led with 715 losses to Northwestern's 712. The regular season finished with Northwestern atop the list at 718 losses to Indiana's 715.) The Hoosiers defeated a top-five ranked opponent on the road for the first time (Week 7 at Oregon); were ranked No. 1 in each of the AP poll, Coaches Poll, and CFP rankings for the first time; had a road victory at Penn State in Week 11, marking their first ever win in Beaver Stadium; finished the regular season with an unblemished 12–0 record for the first time (exceeding their program record of 11 wins from the previous year); and made their first Big Ten Championship Game in program history. In that game, they defeated Ohio State for the first time since 1988 to win the Big Ten title for the first time since 1967. Indiana also won the conference outright for the first time since 1945, which was the most recent time that Indiana finished a season undefeated (9–0–1). The 2025 Hoosiers team became the first team in program history to finished the regular season undefeated and untied. Quarterback Fernando Mendoza became the first Hoosier to win the Heisman Trophy.

In the playoffs, the Hoosiers received a first-round bye; they defeated Alabama in the 2026 Rose Bowl quarterfinal, 38–3, which marked Indiana's first bowl win since the 1991 Copper Bowl against Baylor. The Hoosiers subsequently defeated Oregon in the 2026 Peach Bowl semifinal at Mercedes-Benz Stadium, 56–22, leading the Hoosiers to their first-ever national championship appearance. The Hoosiers do not claim any prior national championships in college football.

Indiana was led by second-year head coach Curt Cignetti, who entered with a record of 26–2 at the school.

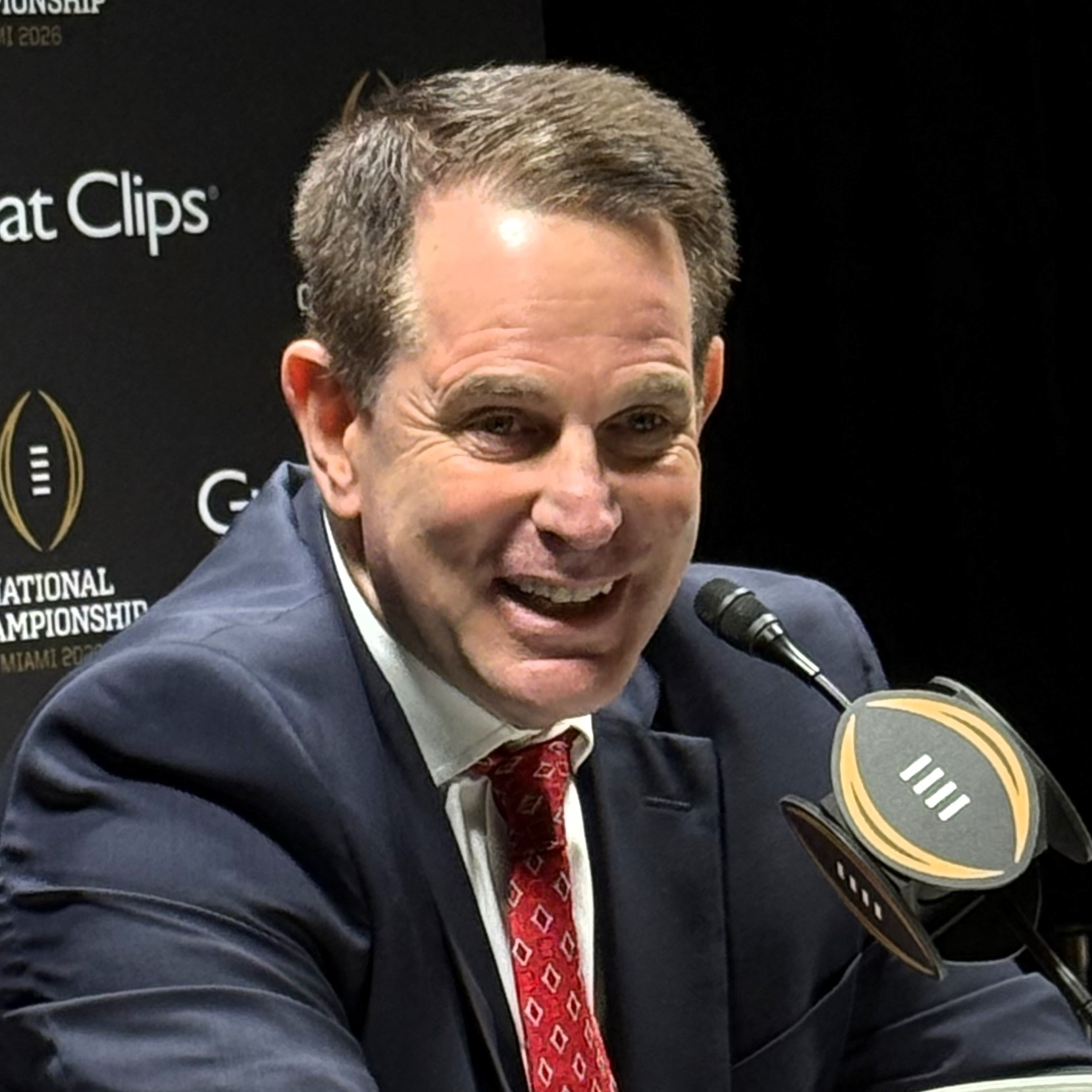
Indiana head coach Curt Cignetti

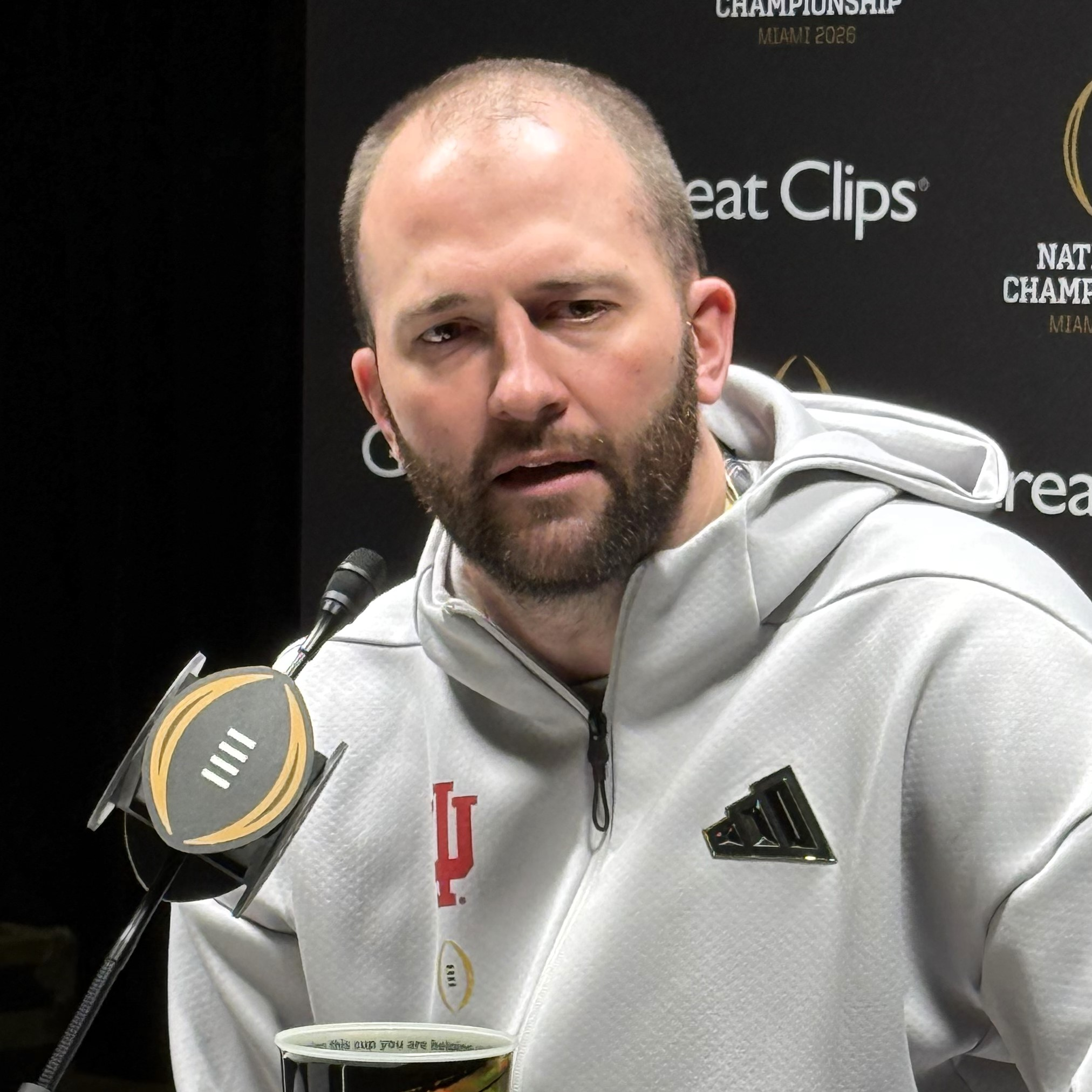
Indiana offensive coordinator Mike Shanahan

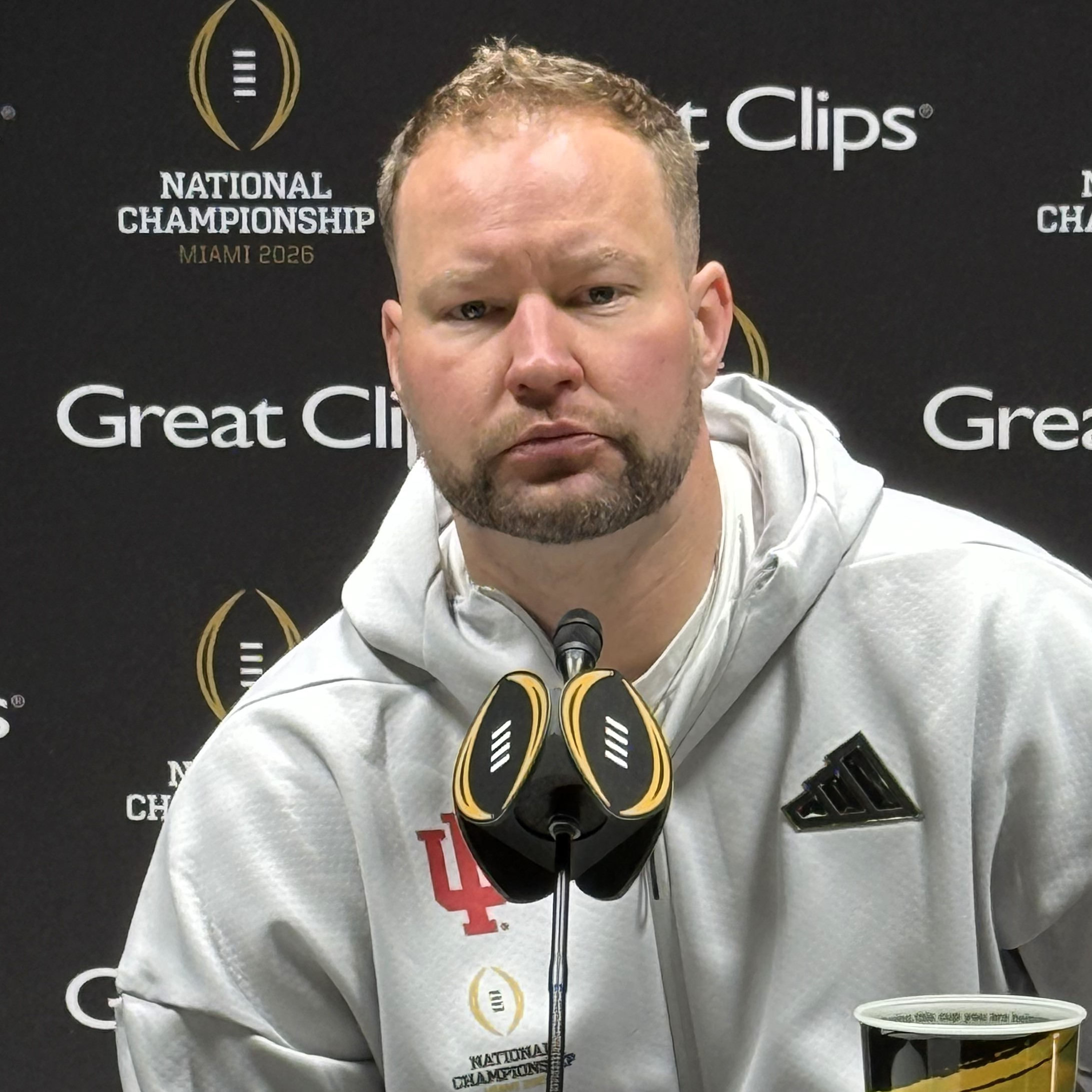
Indiana defensive coordinator Bryant Haines
Photos from CFP Media Day.

== Starting lineups ==
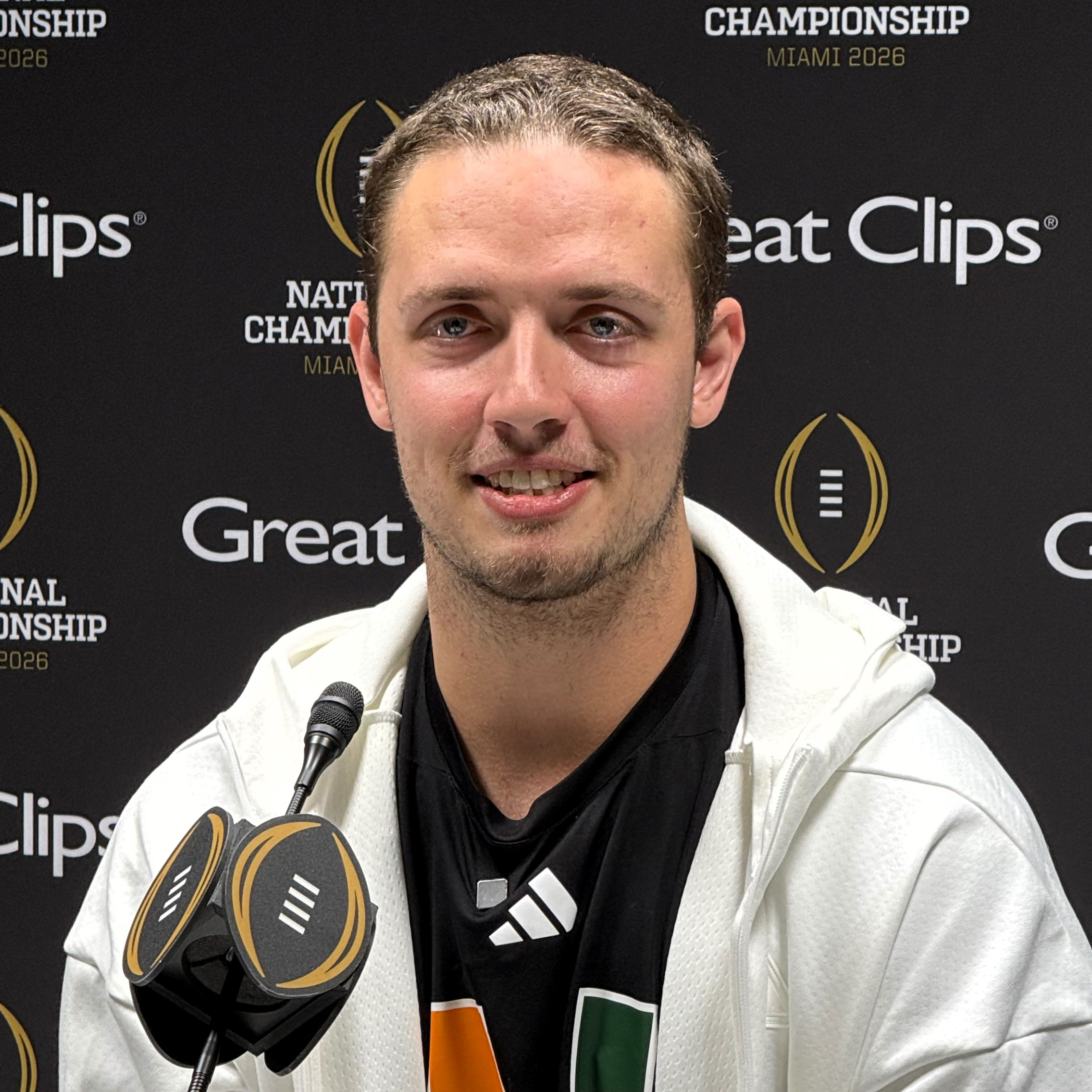
Miami quarterback Carson Beck

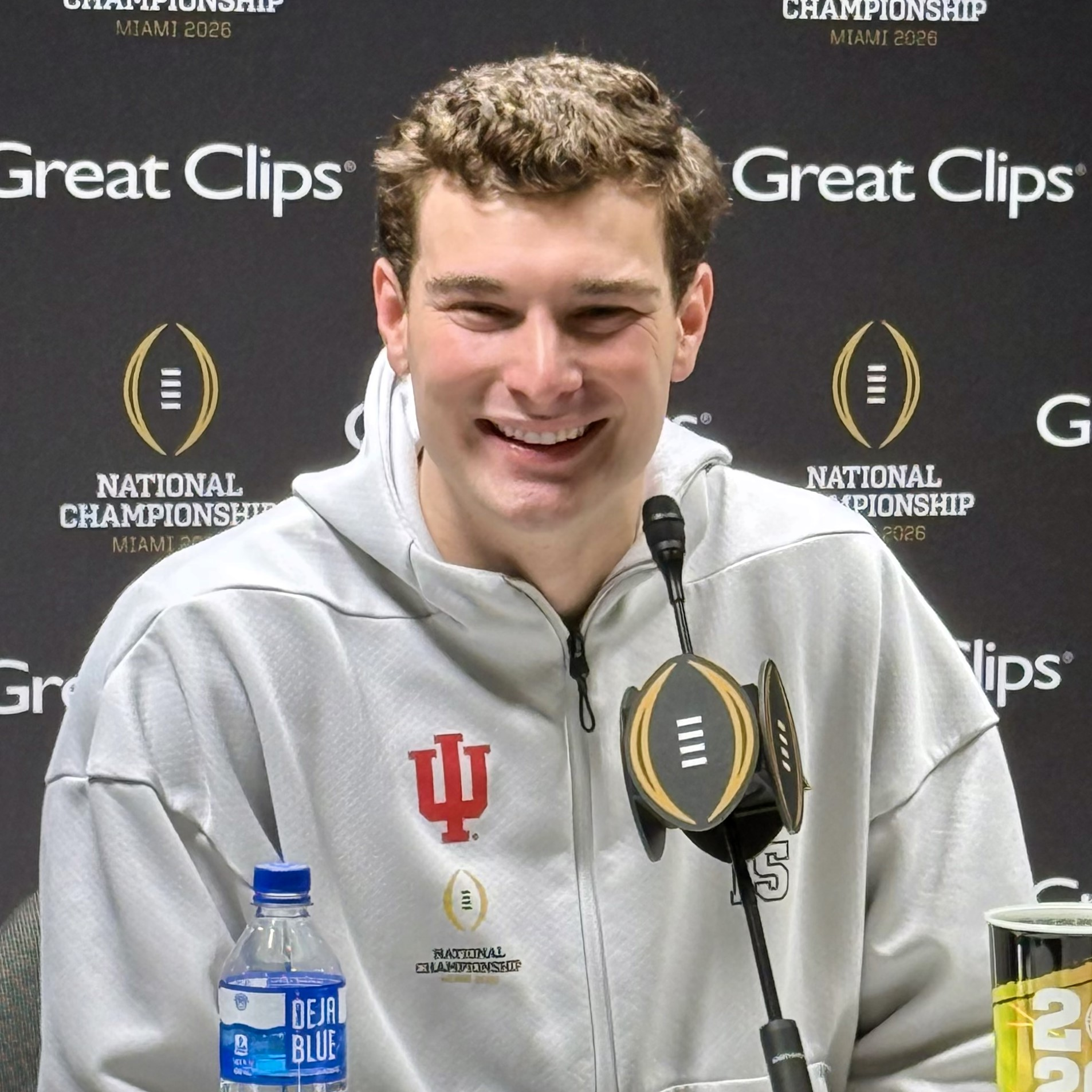
Indiana quarterback Fernando Mendoza

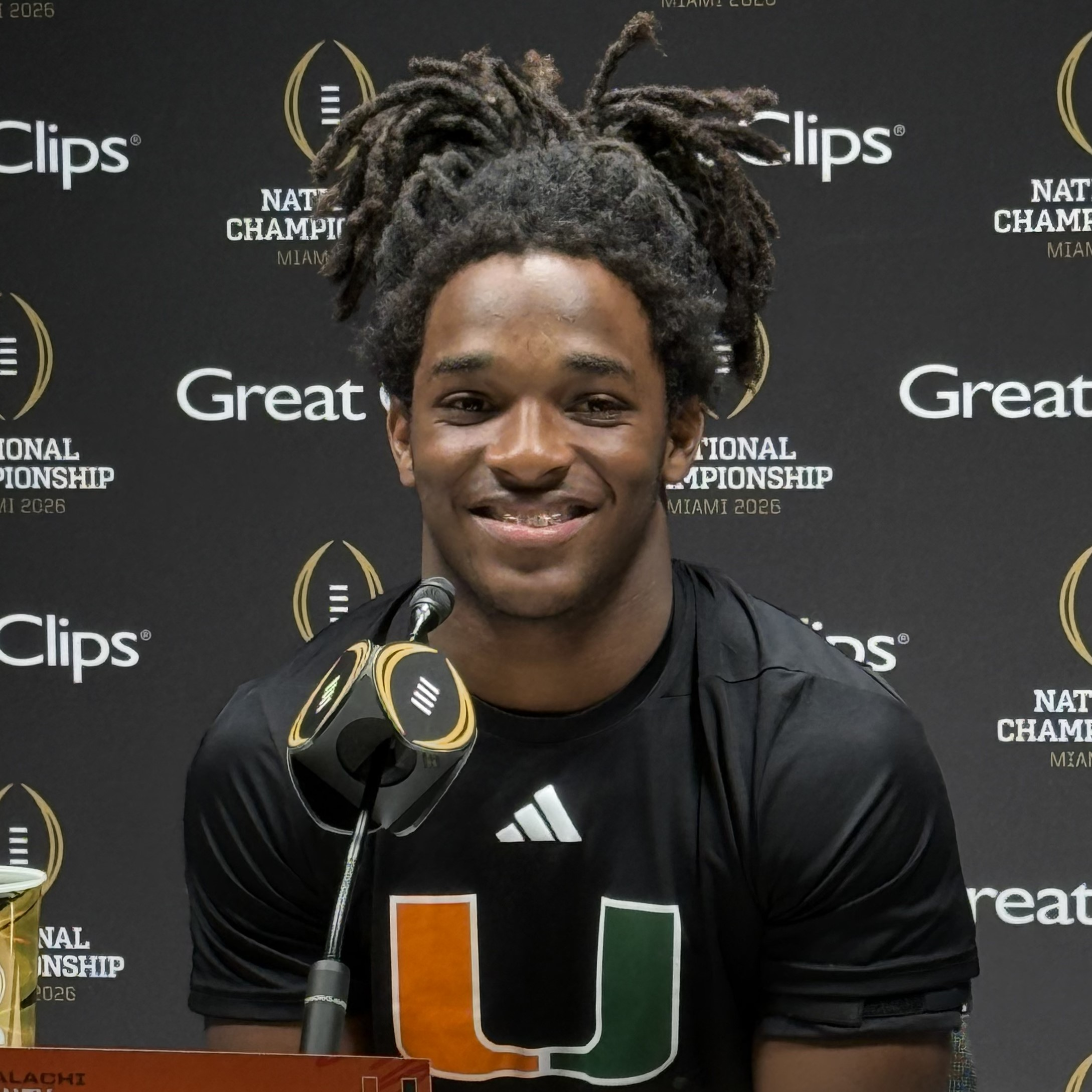
Miami wide receiver Malachi Toney

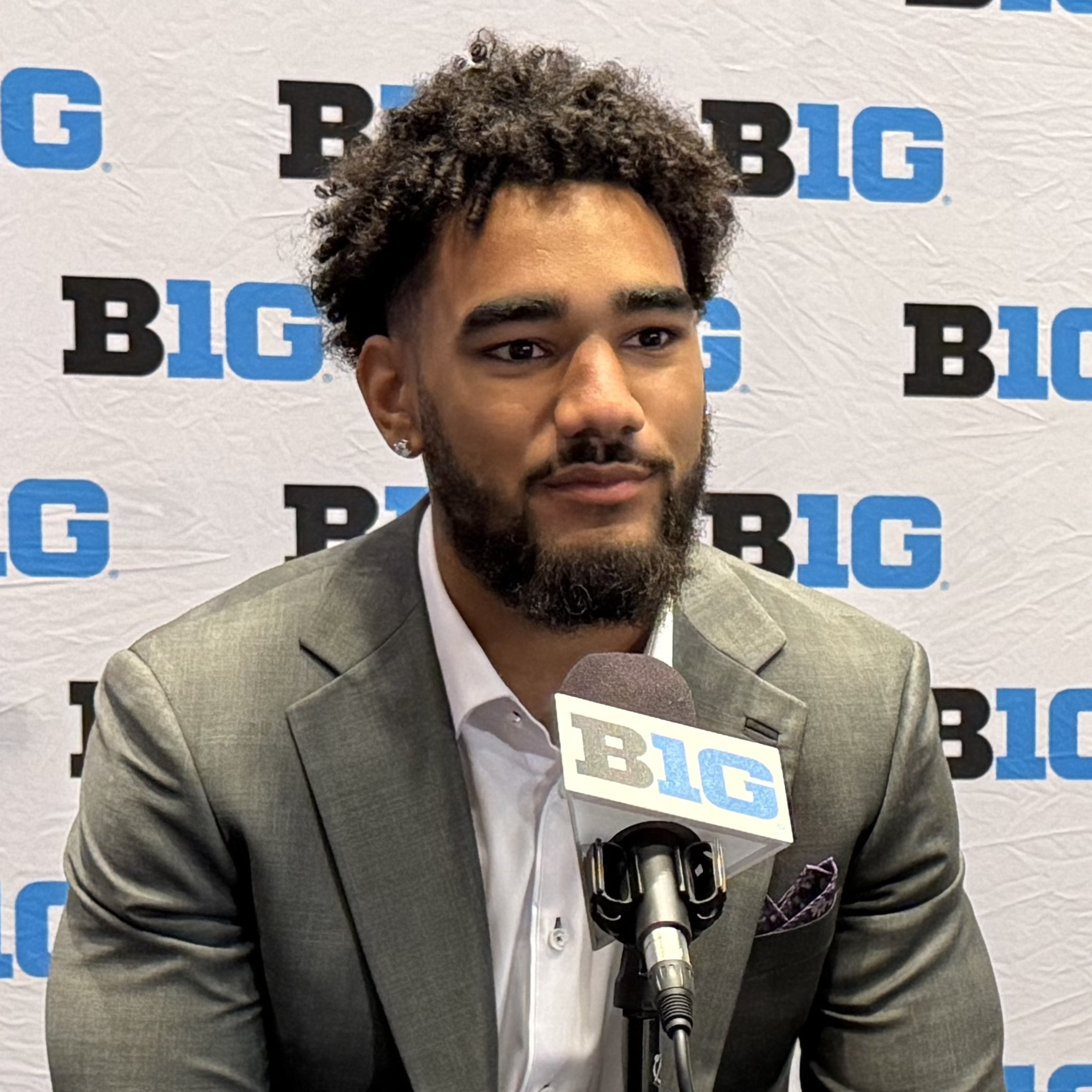
Indiana wide receiver Elijah Sarratt

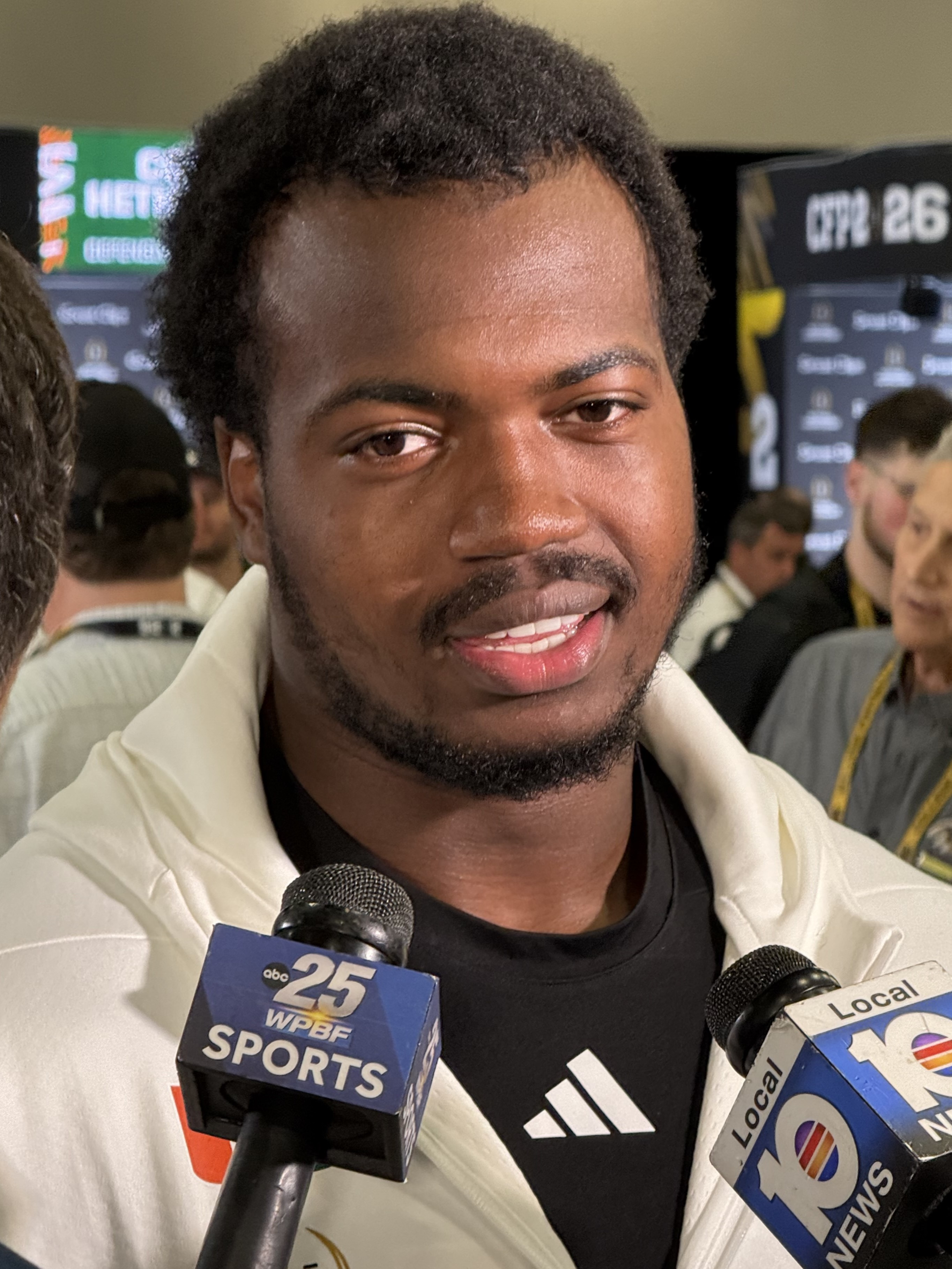
Miami defensive end Rueben Bain Jr.

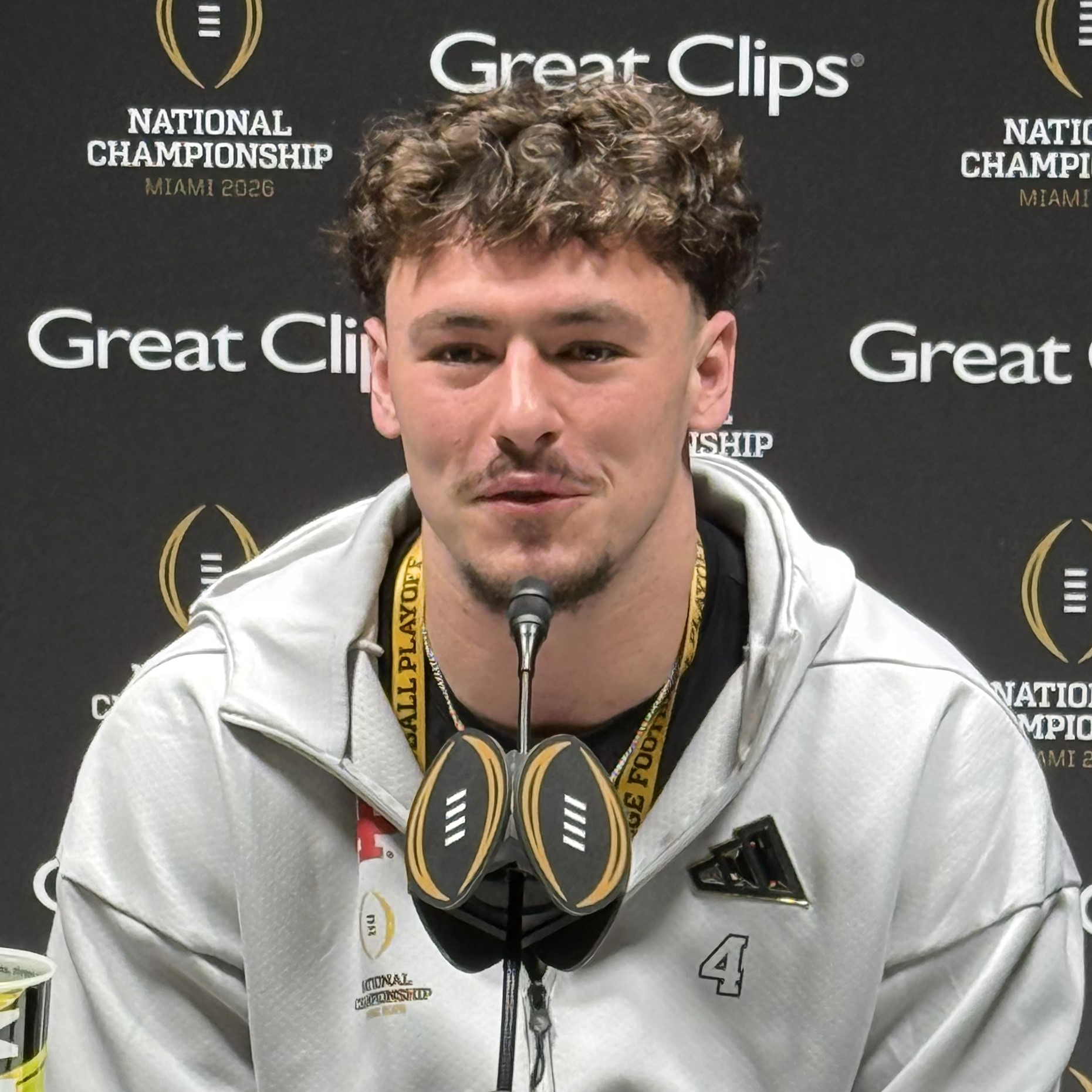
Indiana linebacker Aiden Fisher

Miami	Position		Indiana
Offense
Keelan Marion	WR		Elijah Sarratt 4
CJ Daniels 6	WR		Charlie Becker
Malachi Toney	WR		Omar Cooper Jr. 1
Markel Bell 3	LT		† Carter Smith
Matthew McCoy	LG		Drew Evans
James Brockermeyer	C		Pat Coogan 6
Anez Cooper 6	RG		Bray Lynch
† Francis Mauigoa 1	RT		Kahlil Benson
Alex Bauman	TE		Riley Nowakowski 5
Carson Beck 3	QB		† Fernando Mendoza 1
Mark Fletcher Jr.	RB		Roman Hemby
Defense
Justin Scott	DT		Tyrique Tucker
Ahmad Moten Sr.	DT		Dominique Ratcliff
Akheem Mesidor 1	DE		Mikail Kamara
† Rueben Bain Jr. 1	DE		Mario Landino
Mohamed Toure	LB		Aiden Fisher 7
Wesley Bissainthe	LB		Isaiah Jones
OJ Frederique Jr.	CB		Jamari Sharpe
Ethan O'Connor	CB		D'Angelo Ponds 2
Jakobe Thomas 3	SS		Louis Moore
Zechariah Poyser	FS		Amare Ferrell
Keionte Scott 4	NB	LB	Rolijah Hardy
Source • † 2025 All-American
Selected in the 2026 NFL draft (number corresponds to draft round)

== Broadcasting ==
The game was televised in the United States on ESPN for the twelfth consecutive year, with Megacast coverage across numerous other channels in the ESPN family. The primary ESPN broadcast featured the Saturday Night Football commentary team of Chris Fowler, Kirk Herbstreit, and Holly Rowe, in addition to Molly McGrath. Former Big Ten referee Bill Lemonnier also joined as a rules analyst. Field Pass with The Pat McAfee Show aired on ESPN2, hosted from the sidelines by Pat McAfee. This was the first championship Megacast since 2021 to include Coaches Film Room, which aired on ESPNU. It was hosted by Zubin Mehenti with Steve Addazio, Dave Clawson, Gene Chizik, Mike Gundy, and former Big Ten referee Jerry McGinn as a rules analyst. The Megacast coverage also included Field Pass with ACC Huddle on the ACC Network, SkyCast on ESPNews, and both Command Center and All-22 on ESPN Unlimited. The national ESPN telecast was produced in 4K resolution.

The ESPN radio feed featured Sean McDonough on play-by-play with analysis from Greg McElroy, with Ian Fitzsimmons and Katie George on the sidelines and former SEC referee Matt Austin as a rules analyst. The Miami Hurricanes Radio Network and WQAM feeds featured Joe Zagacki, Don Bailey, and Josh Darrow on the call, while the Indiana Hoosier Sports Network featured Don Fischer, Buck Suhr, and John Herrick.

A Spanish-language broadcast aired on ESPN Deportes, with commentary from Eduardo Varela, Pablo Viruega, Sebastian Christensen and Carlos Nava. The game was televised on TSN in Canada.

In addition, Indiana had a student radio broadcast on WIUX-LP with Luke Brennaman, Ben Haller and Nick Rodecap.

== Game summary ==
The game's officiating crew, representing the Big 12 Conference, was led by referee Michael VanderVelde. The game was scheduled for 7:30 p.m. EST and began at 7:52 p.m. The pregame coin toss was won by Indiana, who deferred their choice to the second half, giving Miami the ball to begin the game.

=== First half ===
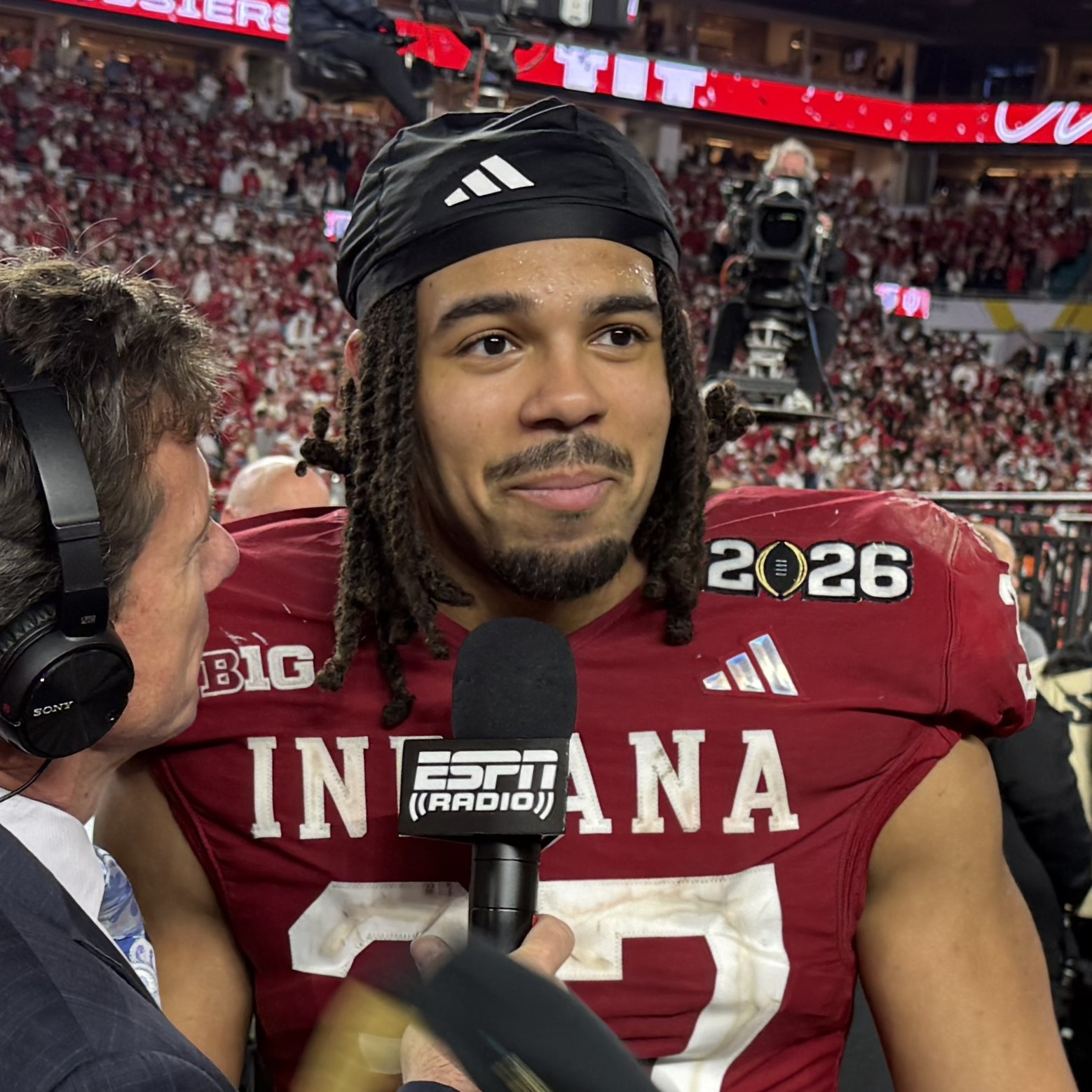
Riley Nowakowski scored the game's first touchdown in the second quarter.

The game began with a kickoff by Indiana's Brendan Franke which was returned by Keelan Marion to the Miami 28-yard line. The Hurricanes earned a first down in two plays but gained five yards on the next three plays and punted to end the possession. Indiana's first play was an 11-yard completion from Fernando Mendoza to Omar Cooper for a first down, but similarly the Hoosiers' offense were unable to earn another and punted. After a Miami three-and-out, Mendoza passed to Cooper for a 25-yard gain and then completed passes to Elijah Sarratt and Riley Nowakowski. Indiana entered the red zone on a Kaelon Black rush with under four minutes left in the first quarter, and the 12-play drive concluded with a 34-yard field goal by Nico Radicic which opened the scoring and gave Indiana a 3–0 lead. The teams then traded three-and-outs which included a sack of Carson Beck by Aiden Fisher and a minus-6 yard rush by Roman Hemby.

Miami retook possession early in the second quarter at their own 32-yard line following Mitch McCarthy's punt. The Hurricanes went three-and-out despite a 7-yard completion from Beck to CJ Daniels after Brown rushed for no gain on 3rd & 2. Dylan Joyce punted to the Indiana 15-yard line where the Hoosiers retook possession with 12:41 left in the half. Mendoza passed to Sarratt for 12 yards and a first down on the first play of Indiana's ensuing drive and they converted 3rd & 2 on a rush by Black several plays later. They crossed into Miami territory as the result of a pass interference penalty against OJ Frederique Jr. and then advanced to the Miami 23-yard line on a 20-yard rush by Black. A Mendoza pass to Charlie Becker gained 15 more yards and the Hoosiers scored the game's first touchdown on a 1-yard rush by Nowakowski shortly after. Retaking possession following a touchback, Miami quickly faced 4th & 1 but converted on a 1-yard rush by Mark Fletcher Jr. Over the next several plays, Beck passed to Daniels for 25 yards and then to Marion for 6 yards, advancing the ball to the Indiana 32-yard line. On 4th & 2 from that spot, Carter Davis missed a 50-yard field goal with 19 seconds remaining. Indiana ran three plays before the quarter ended and went to halftime holding a 10–0 lead.

=== Second half ===
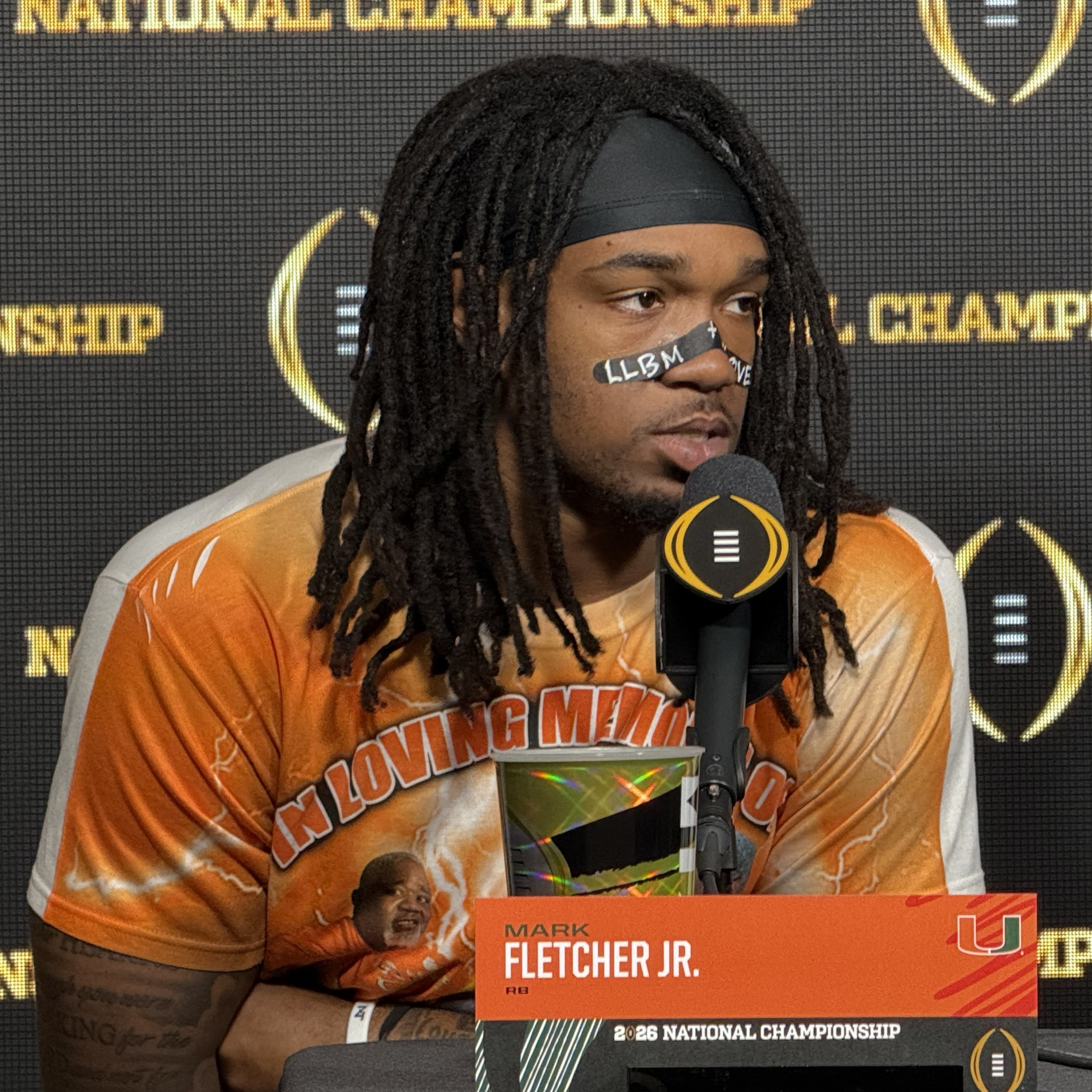
Mark Fletcher Jr. was the game's leading rusher and scored two touchdowns in the second half.

Indiana began the second half with the ball after Davis's kickoff resulted in a touchback. They faced 3rd & 17 early in their possession after a sack of Mendoza by Akheem Mesidor, but a face mask penalty called against Armondo Blount gave Indiana a first down. On the ensuing series, Mendoza was sacked for a loss of 8 yards by Rueben Bain Jr., and McCarthy's punt was returned to the Miami 38-yard line by Malachi Toney. After a short pass completion from Beck to Toney, the Hurricanes scored on a 57-yard rush by Fletcher to cap a two-play drive and narrow their deficit to three points. The next three possessions ended with punts, including a three-and-out for each team. Resuming possession on their own 7-yard line, Miami again went three-and-out and punted, but Joyce's kick was blocked by Mikail Kamara and recovered by Isaiah Jones in the end zone for an Indiana touchdown. On Miami's subsequent drive, Fletcher caught an 8-yard pass from Beck and then rushed for 10 yards on the first two plays, and Beck later passed to Daniels for 24 yards and to Toney for 22 yards to reach the Indiana 12-yard line. Three plays later, on the first play of the fourth quarter, Fletcher rushed for a 3-yard touchdown to make the score 17–14 in favor of the Hoosiers.

Black gained 13 yards on a rush early in Indiana's next drive and Mendoza passed to Cooper for 18 yards two plays later to reach the Miami 42-yard line. They gained five yards over their next three plays and faced 4th & 5 at the Miami 37; after a timeout, Mendoza passed to Becker for a 19-yard gain and a first down at the Miami 18-yard line. Indiana called their second timeout before another fourth down play on the next series; on 4th & 4, Mendoza rushed up the middle for a 12-yard touchdown, reestablishing a 10-point lead for Indiana with nine minutes remaining in the game. Because of a holding penalty on Miami's ensuing kickoff return, the Hurricanes began their possession at their own 9-yard line. They quickly faced 3rd & 15 at their own 15-yard line but converted with a 22-yard pass from Beck to Alex Bauman. On the next play, Beck's pass to Toney was completed for a gain of 41 yards, and the drive finished with a 22-yard touchdown pass from Beck to Toney with 6:32 left to play. Indiana converted twice on third down on their following drive, first on a 14-yard pass from Mendoza to Cooper and then on a 19-yard pass from Mendoza to Becker. A 10-yard Hemby rush was the last play before the two-minute timeout, and Hemby rushed for 9 yards on the next play to reach the red zone. After a false start penalty on 2nd & 1, Miami held to 4th & 4, which allowed Indiana to attempt a 35-yard field goal which was made by Radicic. Miami began their final possession on their own 25-yard line but a delay of game penalty before the first play moved them back to the 20-yard line. A roughing the passer penalty against Mario Landino moved the ball to the Miami 35-yard line and Beck passed to Brown and Toney took it past midfield. On the next play, Beck's pass, intended for Keelan Marion, was well short and was intercepted by Indiana's Jamari Sharpe. Mendoza then took a knee to seal a championship victory, 27–21, completing a perfect 16–0 season for the Hoosiers.

=== Scoring summary ===
2026 College Football Playoff National Championship

Quarter	1	2	3	4	Total
(10) No. 10 Miami	0	0	7	14	21
(1) No. 1 Indiana	3	7	7	10	27

at Hard Rock Stadium • Miami Gardens, Florida

- Date: January 19, 2026
- Game time: 7:30 p.m. EST
- Game weather: Cloudy, 61 °F (16 °C), wind 11 mph (18 km/h) north
- Game attendance: 67,227
- Referee: Michael VanderVelde (Big 12)
- TV announcers (ESPN): Chris Fowler (play-by-play), Kirk Herbstreit (analyst), Holly Rowe and Molly McGrath (sideline reporters)
- ESPN box score / Official game book

Scoring summary

Quarter	Time	Drive			Team	Scoring information	Score	
Quarter	Time	Plays	Yards	TOP	Team	Scoring information	Miami	Indiana
1	2:42	12	55	5:56	Indiana	34-yard field goal by Nico Radicic	0	3
2	6:13	14	85	6:28	Indiana	Riley Nowakowski 1-yard touchdown run, Nico Radicic kick good	0	10
3	11:06	2	62	0:46	Miami	Mark Fletcher Jr. 57-yard touchdown run, Carter Davis kick good	7	10
3	5:04				Indiana	Blocked punt recovered in the end zone for a touchdown by Isaiah Jones, Nico Radicic kick good	7	17
4	14:57	10	81	5:07	Miami	Mark Fletcher Jr. 3-yard touchdown run, Carter Davis kick good	14	17
4	9:18	12	75	5:39	Indiana	Fernando Mendoza 12-yard touchdown run, Nico Radicic kick good	14	24
4	6:37	8	91	2:34	Miami	Malachi Toney 22-yard touchdown reception from Carson Beck, Carter Davis kick good	21	24
4	1:42	11	57	4:55	Indiana	35-yard field goal by Nico Radicic	21	27
"TOP" = time of possession. For other American football terms, see Glossary of American football.							21	27

== Statistics ==
Team statistical comparison
Statistic	Miami	Indiana
First downs	15	20
First downs rushing	5	7
First downs passing	9	11
First downs penalty	1	2
Third down efficiency	3–11	6–15
Fourth down efficiency	1–1	2–2
Total plays–net yards	53–342	72–317
Rushing attempts–net yards	21–110	45–131
Yards per rush	5.2	2.9
Yards passing	232	186
Pass completions–attempts	19–32	16–27
Interceptions thrown	1	0
Punt returns–total yards	4–23	1–16
Kickoff returns–total yards	4–81	0–0
Punts–average yardage	6–39.0	5–48.2
Fumbles–lost	0–0	0–0
Penalties–yards	7–60	5–38
Time of possession	23:36	36:24

Miami statistics
Hurricanes passing
	C–A	Yds	TD–INT
Carson Beck	19–32	232	1–1
Hurricanes rushing
	Car	Yds	TD
Mark Fletcher Jr.	17	112	2
CharMar Brown	3	5	0
Carson Beck	1	−7	0
Hurricanes receiving
	Rec	Yds	TD
Malachi Toney	10	122	1
CJ Daniels	4	62	0
Alex Bauman	1	22	0
CharMar Brown	1	11	0
Mark Fletcher Jr.	1	8	0
Keelan Marion	1	6	0
Joshua Moore	1	1	0

Indiana statistics
Hoosiers passing
	C–A	Yds	TD–INT
Fernando Mendoza	16–27	186	0–0
Hoosiers rushing
	Car	Yds	TD
Kaelon Black	17	79	0
Roman Hemby	19	60	0
Riley Nowakowski	1	1	1
TEAM	1	−1	0
Fernando Mendoza	7	−8	1
Hoosiers receiving
	Rec	Yds	TD
Omar Cooper	5	71	0
Charlie Becker	4	65	0
Elijah Sarratt	3	28	0
Riley Nowakowski	2	17	0
Roman Hemby	2	5	0

== Aftermath ==
Indiana became the first FBS team to finish a season with a 16–0 record. (Note: 1894 Yale finished 16–0; 2019 North Dakota State finished 16–0 at the FCS level.) Indiana quarterback Fernando Mendoza was named offensive MVP and Indiana defensive end Mikail Kamara was named defensive MVP. Indiana was the third consecutive national champion from the Big Ten (2023 Michigan, 2024 Ohio State), marking the first Big Ten three-peat in 83 years (1940 Minnesota, 1941 Minnesota, 1942 Ohio State). Indiana became the first Big Ten team other than Michigan or Ohio State to win a consensus national championship since Minnesota in 1960, and became the first first-time national champion since Florida in 1996.

After the game, Miami running back Mark Fletcher Jr., the game's leading rusher, threw a punch at Indiana defensive tackle Tyrique Tucker for unknown reasons. He also hugged Indiana quarterback Mendoza.

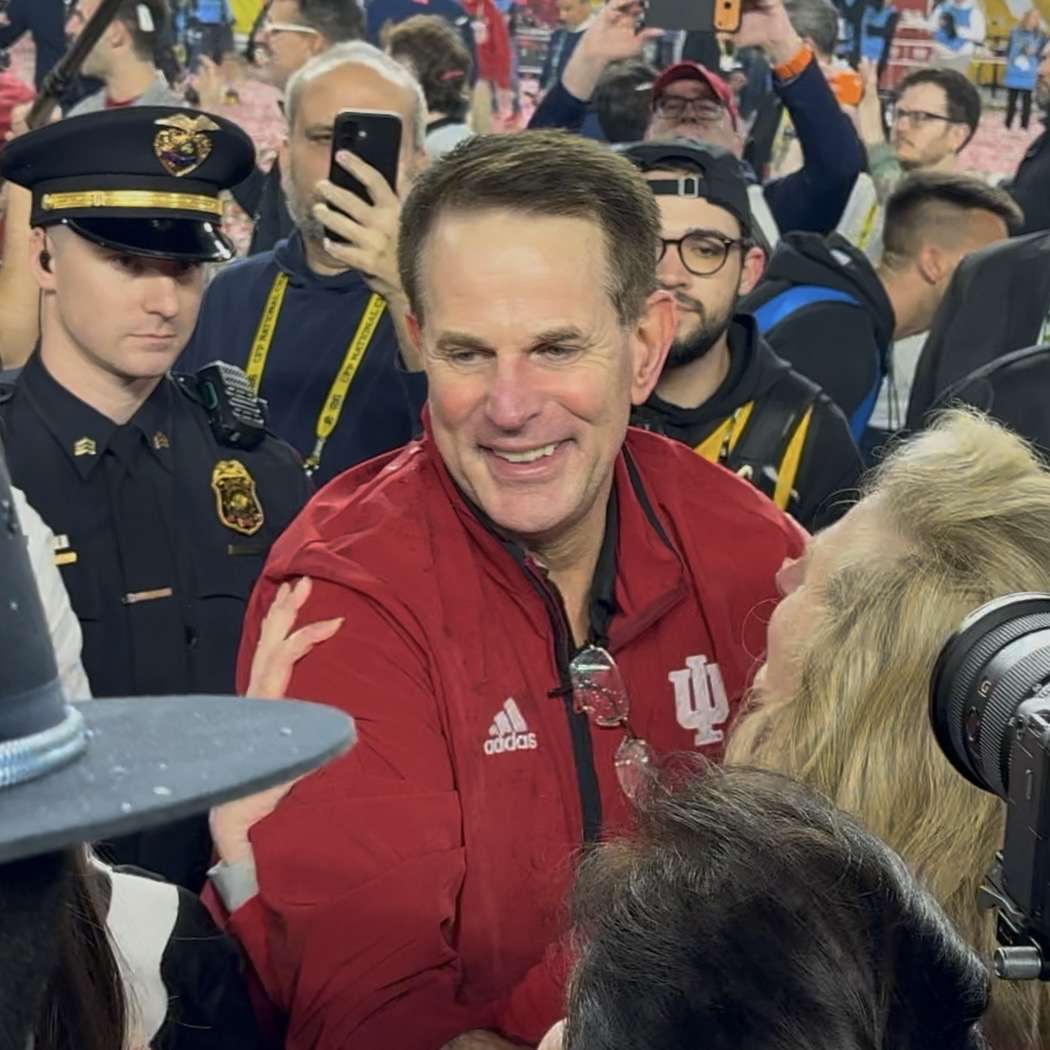
Curt Cignetti celebrates with family immediately after the game.

Indiana players, fans, and coaches celebrate on the field immediately after the game.

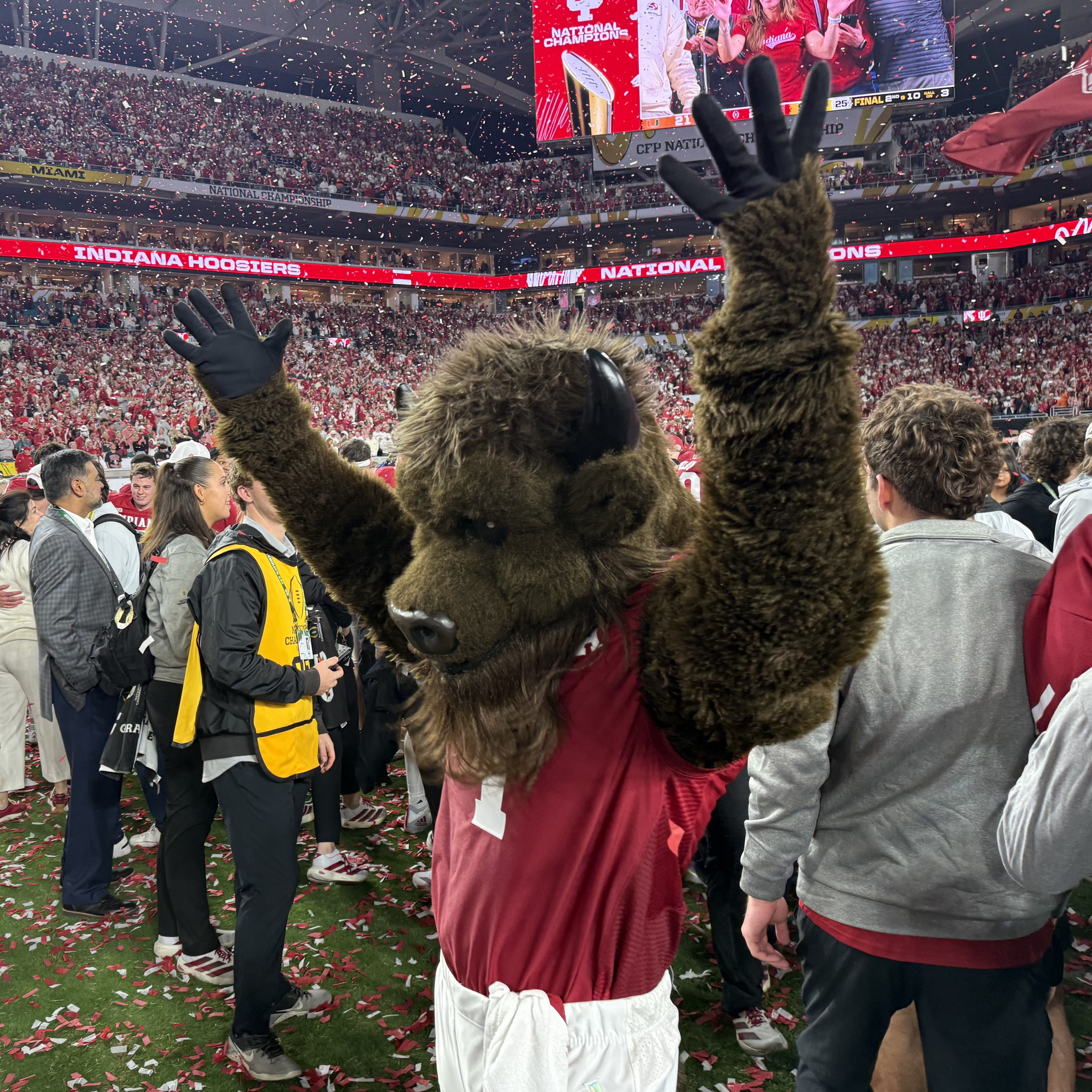
Indiana mascot Hoosier the Bison celebrates on the field.

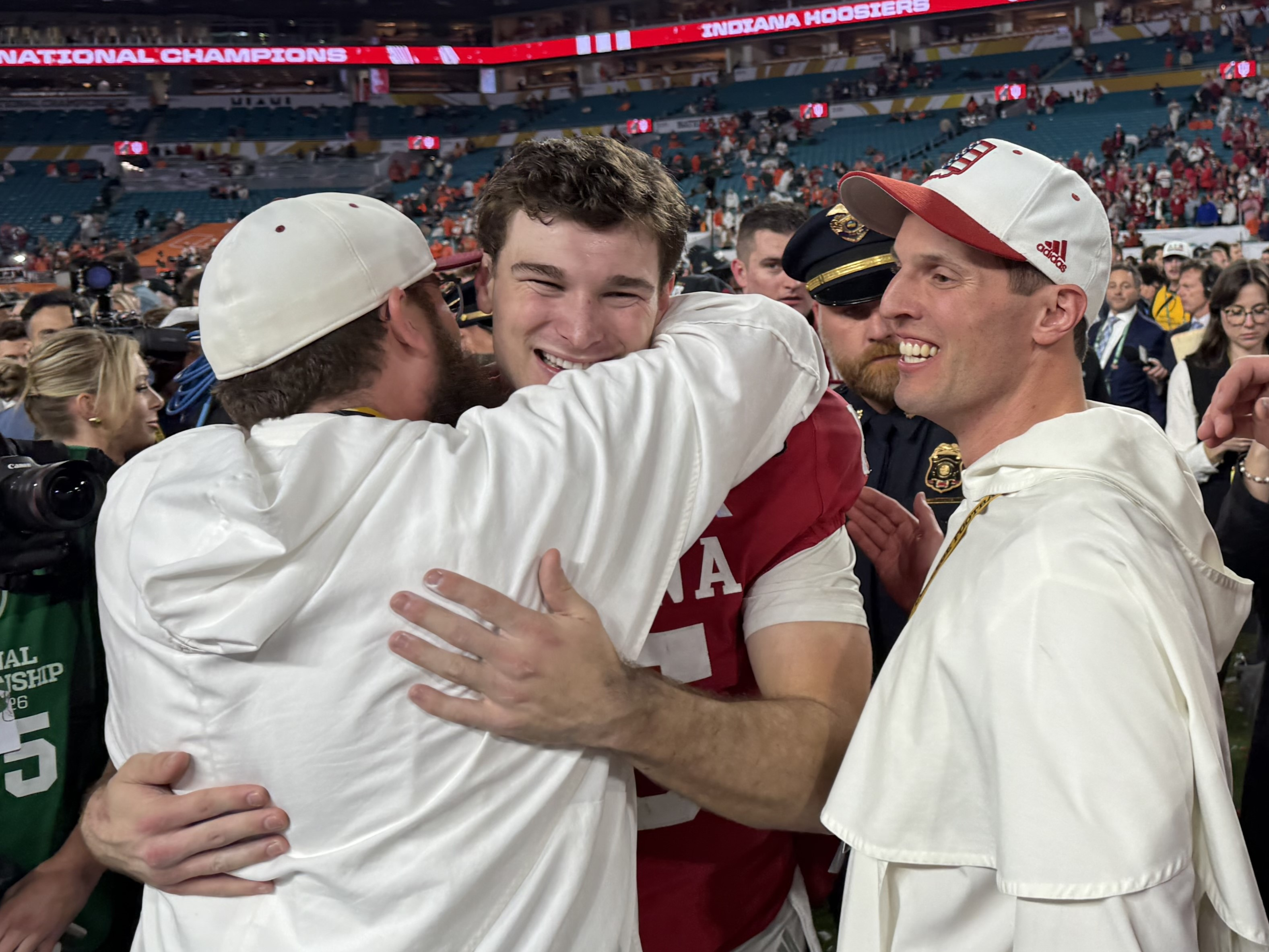
Fernando Mendoza greets Dominican priests he invited from the campus ministry at Indiana University.

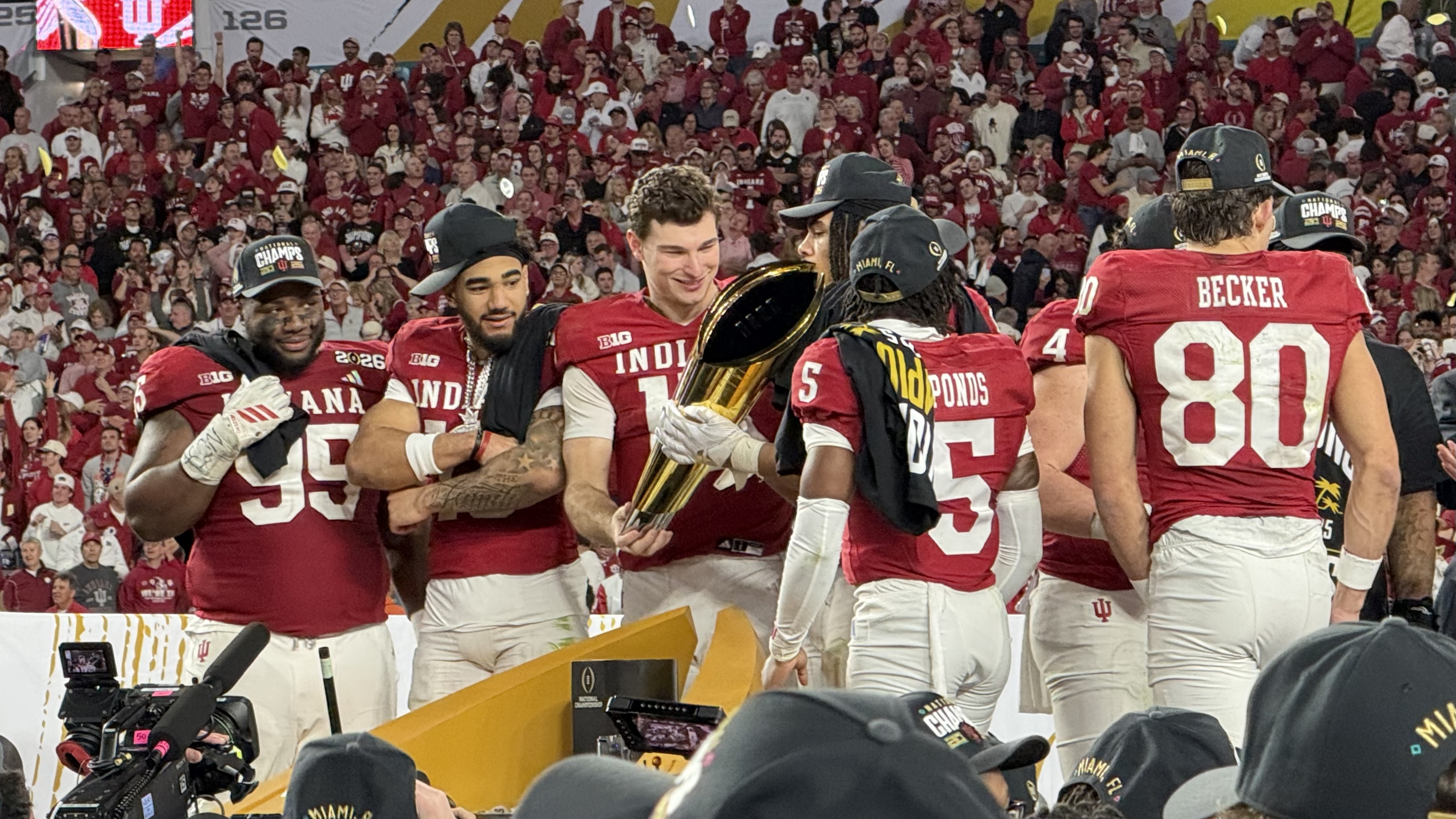
Fernando Mendoza with the CFP Trophy as his teammates look on.

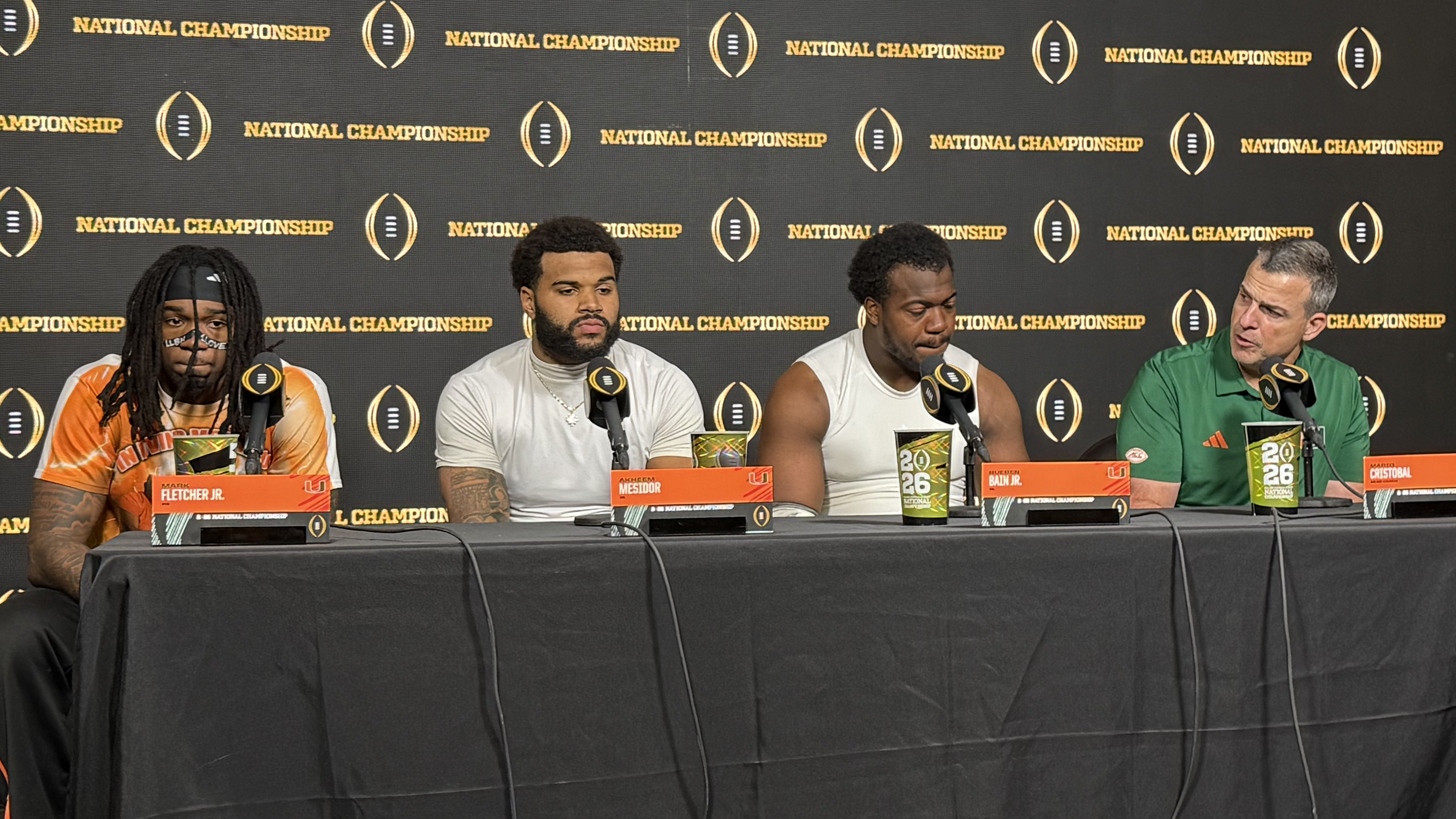
Miami post-game press conference with Mark Fletcher Jr., Akheem Mesidor, Rueben Bain Jr., and Mario Cristobal.

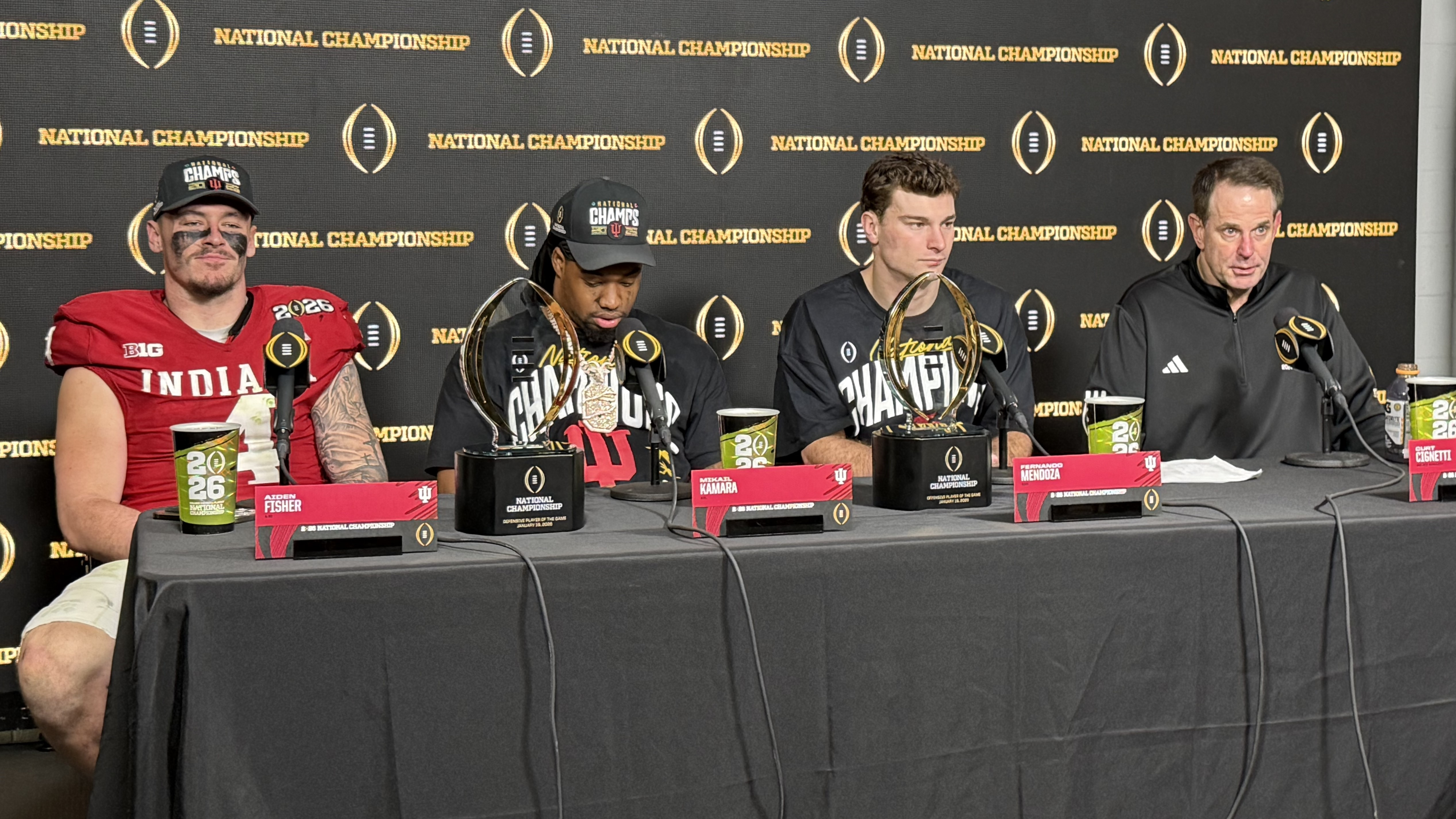
Indiana post-game press conference with Aiden Fisher, Mikail Kamara (defensive MVP), Fernando Mendoza (offensive MVP), and Curt Cignetti.
All photos from stadium after the game, in rough chronological order.

== See also ==
- College football national championships in NCAA Division I FBS
