= Isaiah Jones (linebacker) =

American football linebacker (born 2003)

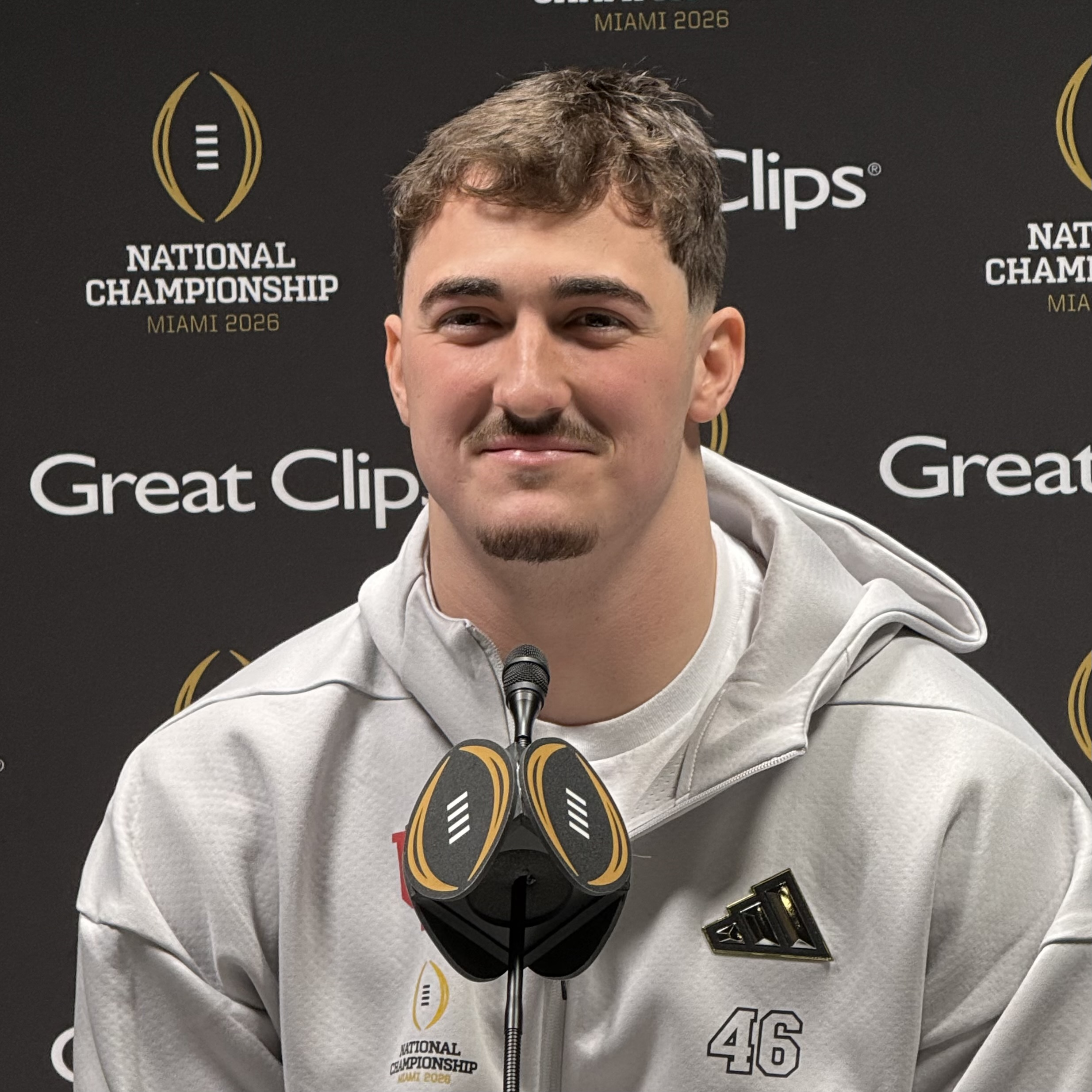
- Jones in 2026

No. 46 – Indiana Hoosiers
- Position: Linebacker
- Class: Redshirt Senior

Personal information
- Born: July 21, 2003 (age 23)
- Listed height: 6 ft 2 in (1.88 m)
- Listed weight: 230 lb (104 kg)

Career information
- High school: London (London, Ohio)
- College: Indiana (2022–present)

Awards and highlights
- CFP national champion (2025); Third-team All-Big Ten (2025)
- Stats at ESPN

Isaiah Jones (born July 21, 2003) is an American football linebacker for the Indiana Hoosiers.

== Early life ==
Jones attended London High School located in London, Ohio. Coming out of high school, he was rated as a three-star recruit, where he committed to play college football for the Indiana Hoosiers over offers from other schools such as Cincinnati, Minnesota, Duke, and Wake Forest.

== College career ==
During his first two seasons in 2022 and 2023, Jones only appeared in a total of games due to lingering back injuries, while using a redshirt season in 2022. During the 2024 season, he appeared in 13 games with two starts, where he totaled 42 tackles with three and a half going for a loss, and half a sack. In week three of the 2025 season, Jones notched four tackles with two and a half going for a loss, and a sack in a win versus the Indiana State Sycamores. In week four, he put up two tackles for a loss and a sack in a dominant upset victory versus the Illinois Fighting Illini. In week seven, Jones recorded eight tackles with two being for a loss, a sack, and an interception in an upset win over the Oregon Ducks. In week nine, he tallied eight tackles with half a tackle going for a loss, half a sack, and a forced fumble in a 56–6 win against the UCLA Bruins. In Indiana's win against the Miami Hurricanes in the 2026 College Football Playoff National Championship, Jones recovered a Miami punt blocked by Mikail Kamara in the end zone for a touchdown.
