= Sheik I. Kamara =

Sierra Leonean politician

Sheik I Kamara is a Sierra Leonean politician. He is a member of Parliament from the Western Area Rural District (or West-East District) with the Sierra Leone People's Party as well as a representative at the Pan-African Parliament.
