= Dinesh Kumara =

Sri Lankan cricketer (born 1987)

Dinesh Kumara (full name Hallawa Arachchilage Indika Dinesh Kumara; born 13 January 1987) is a Sri Lankan cricketer. He is a left-handed batsman and a right-arm medium-fast bowler who plays for Police Sports Club. He was born in Kebithigollewa.

Kumara, who made his cricketing debut for Police Sports Club Under-23s during the 2008 season, made his List A debut for the side during the 2009-10 Premier Limited Overs Tournament, against Sebastianites Cricket and Athletic Club. From the tailend, he failed to score a run with the bat, and with the ball, conceded 18 runs from 2 overs.
