= Abdoulaye Camara =

Abdoulaye Camara or Abdoulaye Kamara may refer to:

- Abdoulaye Camara (archaeologist), researcher who produced an influential work on the role of Île de Gorée in the slave trade
- Abdoulaye Camara (footballer, born 1980), Malian football defender
- Abdoulaye Camara (footballer, born 2006), Guinean football winger for Vejle
- Abdoulaye Camara (footballer, born 2008), French football defensive midfielder for Udinese
- Abdoulaye Naby Camara (born 1994), Guinean football defender for CI Kamsar
- Abdoulaye Paye Camara (born 1995), Guinean football midfielder for Horoya AC
- Abdoulaye Kamara (born 2004), Guinean football midfield for 1. FC Saarbrücken
