= Siré Komara =

Guinean writer (born 1991)

- Born: January 1, 1991 (age 35)
- Citizenship: Guinea
- Occupation: Writer

Siré Komara (born 1991) is a Guinean writer.

Komara, daughter of an international civil servant, left Guinea for Egypt at the age of three. She published the autobiographical Mes Racines at the age of 14. She also has published a comic book, Le Téléphone de Siré.

== Works ==
- Mes Racines (My Roots), Paris: Cauris Editions, 2006.
- Le Téléphone de Siré, 2007
