= Prasad Kumara =

Sri Lankan cricketer (born 1978)

Prasad Kumara (born Withanachchi Koralge Nihal Prasad Kumara on 28 April 1978) was a Sri Lankan cricketer. He was a right-handed batsman and a right-arm medium-fast bowler who played for Saracens Sports Club. He was born in Kaluthara.

Kumara made a single first-class appearance for the side, during the 2005–06 season, against Burgher Recreation Club. From the tailend, he scored 10 not out in the first innings in which he batted, and 6 not out in the second, as Saracens lost the match by an innings margin.

Kumara bowled 5 overs in the match, conceding 17 runs.
