= Yoshan Kumara =

Sri Lankan cricketer (born 1990)

Yoshan Kumara (full name Kalugala Yoshan Kumara; born 8 June 1990) is a Sri Lankan cricketer. He is a right-handed batsman and right-arm medium-pace bowler who plays for Moratuwa Sports Club. He was born in Galle.

Kumara, who has previously played for the Sri Lanka Air Force Sports Club and Moratuwa Sports Club Under-23 teams, made his List A debut during the 2009–10 season, against Panadura Sports Club. From the tailend, he scored 1 not out.
