= Mikail Kamara =

American football player (born 2001)

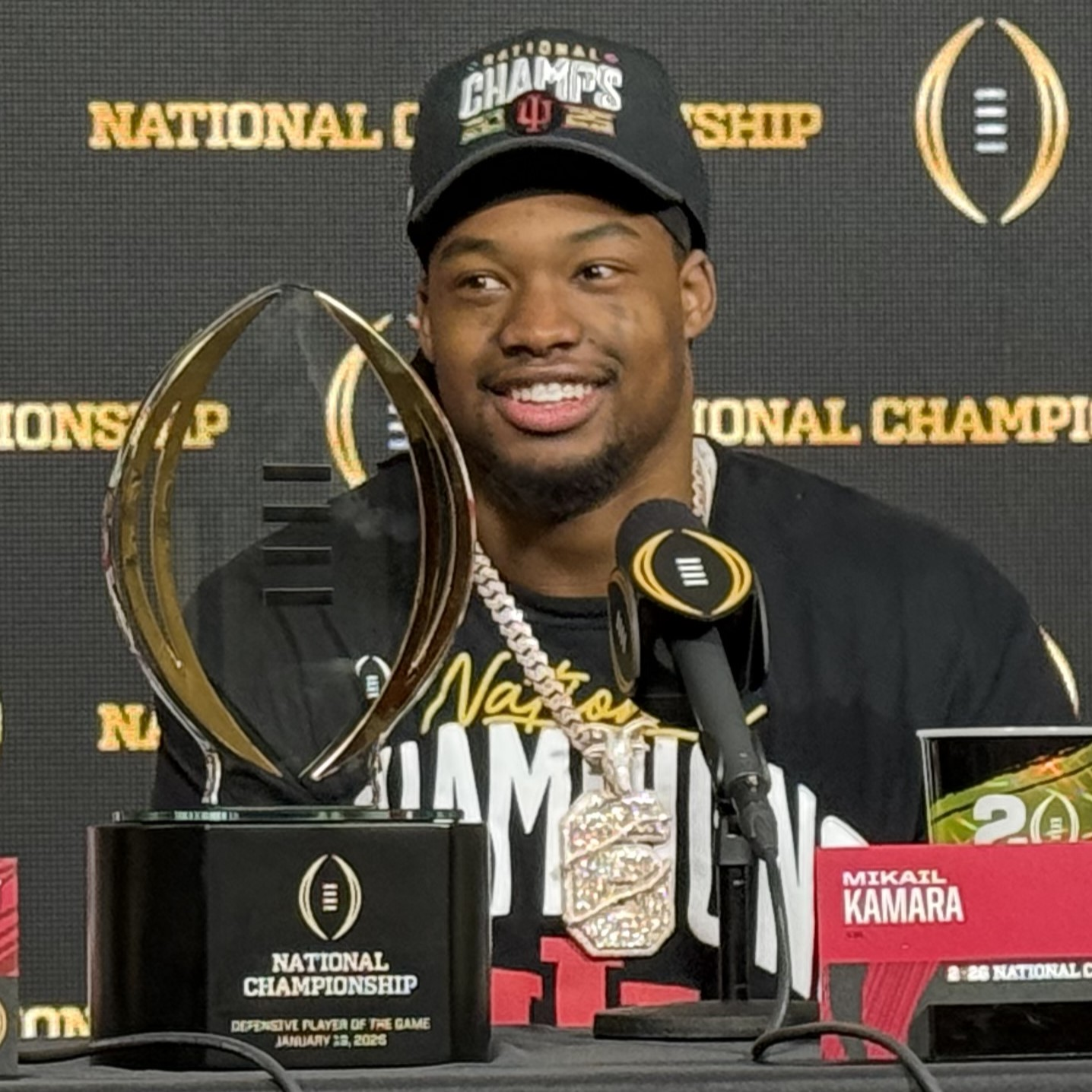
- Kamara after the 2026 CFP Championship, where he was named Defensive Player of the Game.

No. 59 – San Francisco 49ers
- Position: Defensive end
- Roster status: Injured reserve

Personal information
- Born: October 9, 2001 (age 25); Ashburn, Virginia, U.S.
- Listed height: 6 ft 1 in (1.85 m)
- Listed weight: 250 lb (113 kg)

Career information
- High school: Stone Bridge (Ashburn, Virginia)
- College: James Madison (2020–2023); Indiana (2024–2025)
- NFL draft: 2026: undrafted

Career history
- San Francisco 49ers (2026–present)

Awards and highlights
- CFP national champion (2025); CFP Defensive Player of the Game (2025); Third-team All-American (2024); First-team All-Big Ten (2024); Second team All-Sun Belt (2023)
- Stats at Pro Football Reference

Mikail Kamara (born October 9, 2001) is an American professional football defensive end for the San Francisco 49ers of the National Football League (NFL). Kamara won a national championship in 2026 and was selected as the game's defensive MVP. He previously played for the James Madison Dukes and the Indiana Hoosiers.

== Early life ==
Kamara was born on October 9, 2001 in Ashburn, Virginia. Kamara attended Stone Bridge High School in Ashburn where he had 16 sacks his junior year and 15 his senior year. He was named the Region 5C Defensive Player of the Year his senior season. Kamara committed to James Madison University to play college football. His father is originally from Sierra Leone.

== College career ==
As a freshman at James Madison in 2020, Kamara started all six games in the COVID-19 shortened season, and recorded 16 tackles and three sacks. After missing the 2021 season due to injury and redshirting, he played in five games in 2022 and had 14 tackles and four sacks. In 2023, he started all 12 games and finished with 52 tackles and 6.5 sacks.

After JMU's head coach, Curt Cignetti, was hired by the Indiana Hoosiers, Kamara entered the transfer portal and followed his coach to Indiana. He was a starter his first year at Indiana in 2024, and recorded 10.0 sacks, which helped him earn 1st Team All-Big Ten and 3rd Team All-American honors. In 2025 Kamara started in all sixteen games of the Hoosiers' undefeated season and led the Big Ten Conference in total quarterback pressures with 59. Kamara was named the defensive MVP of the 2026 College Football Playoff National Championship after blocking a punt in the third quarter that was quickly recovered by teammate Isaiah Jones.

== Professional career ==
Pre-draft measurables
Height	Weight	Arm length	Hand span	Wingspan	40-yard dash	10-yard split	20-yard split	20-yard shuttle	Vertical jump	Broad jump
6 ft 0 5/8 in (1.84 m)	250 lb (113 kg)	31 3/8 in (0.80 m)	9 5/8 in (0.24 m)	6 ft 5 1/8 in (1.96 m)	4.93 s	1.70 s	2.86 s	4.75 s	34.0 in (0.86 m)	9 ft 1 in (2.77 m)
All values from Pro Day

After going undrafted in the 2026 NFL draft, Kamara signed with the San Francisco 49ers as an undrafted free agent. On August 2, 2026, Kamara was waived by the 49ers with an injury designation after suffering a torn ACL during training camp. He then returned to the 49ers injured reserve after he cleared waivers.
