= Tibou Kamara =

Guinean politician and journalist

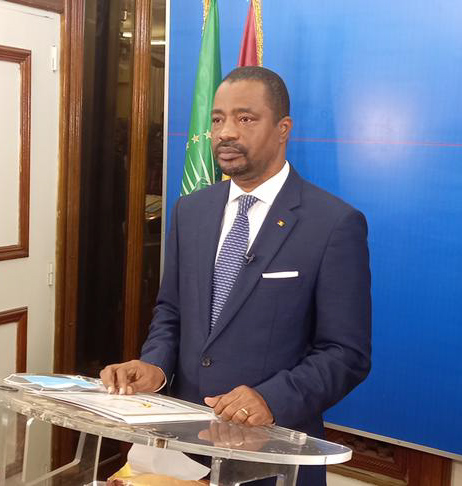

Tibou Kamara is a Guinean politician and journalist.

== Early life ==
Kamara began his career as a journalist. In 2003, he became the managing editor of the weekly newspaper L'Observateur. From 19 June 2008, he was the Minister of Communication and New Information Technologies. Previously, he was chairman of the National Council of Communication. In September 2021, Tibou Kamara was arrested at his home by armed and hooded men, according to one of his relatives. “They arrived around 1am. Without waiting, they started to break down the doors and took him to an unknown destination, ”said a relative of Tibou Kamara.

Prior to his political career, he authored and published the book Lansana Conté in 1998.

He is married to Miryam Soumah and is the father of a daughter, Rayane and a son, Riad Yaya.
