= Masire Kamara =

Sierra Leone celebrity and tea seller

Masire Kamara is a Sierra Leone celebrity and tea seller. She has been called "The tiny bride" due to her small stature. When she, a Christian married a Muslim on May 1, 2009 in Freetown the wedding was a major event in Sierra Leone.
