= Malith Kumara =

Sri Lankan cricketer (born 1989)

Malith Kumara (full name Heema Hewage Malith Kumara Silva; born 14 November 1989) is a Sri Lankan cricketer. He is a right-handed batsman and leg-break bowler who plays for Police Sports Club. He was born in Panadura.

Kumara has made a single first-class appearance for the side during the 2009–10 season, against Moratuwa Sports Club. He did not bat in the match, but bowled four overs, conceding 21 runs.
