= Pinstripe Bowl =

American college football game

- Bad Boy Mowers Pinstripe Bowl
- Stadium: Yankee Stadium
- Location: The Bronx, New York City
- Operated: 2010–present
- Conference tie-ins: ACC, Big Ten
- Previous conference tie-ins: American, Big 12, Big East, Notre Dame
- Payout: US$4.4 million (2019)
- Website: pinstripebowl.com

Sponsors
- New Era Cap Company (2010–2021); Bad Boy Mowers (2022–present)

Former names
- Yankee Bowl (2010, working title)

2025 matchup
- Penn State vs. Clemson (Penn State 22–10)

The Pinstripe Bowl is a National Collegiate Athletic Association (NCAA) Division I Football Bowl Subdivision (FBS) college football bowl game held annually since 2010 at Yankee Stadium in the Bronx, New York City. Through 2025 it is affiliated with the Atlantic Coast Conference and Big Ten Conference; it previously had ties with the Big 12 Conference and the Big East Conference.

The winner receives the George M. Steinbrenner Trophy; during the New Era sponsorship, the bowl's most valuable player received the David C. Koch MVP Trophy, named for the late New Era CEO. The Pinstripe Bowl is one of four outdoor cold-weather bowls, the others being the Military Bowl (Annapolis, Maryland), the Fenway Bowl (Boston, Massachusetts), and the Famous Idaho Potato Bowl (Boise, Idaho). It is one of three active bowls played in baseball stadiums, the others being the Rate Bowl (Chase Field) and the Fenway Bowl (Fenway Park).

== History ==
On September 30, 2009, a "Yankee Bowl" was announced at a Yankee Stadium press conference by then-representatives of the involved parties: Yankees' minority owner Hal Steinbrenner, Mayor of New York City Michael Bloomberg, Big East Conference commissioner John Marinatto, and Big 12 Conference commissioner Dan Beebe. The most recent bowl in New York City proper had been the 1962 Gotham Bowl, which pitted Miami (FL) against Nebraska at the original Yankee Stadium. The newly announced bowl planned to pair the fourth-place team from the Big East Conference against the seventh-place team from the Big 12. In the event the Big 12 lacked an eligible team, independent Notre Dame could receive an invitation.

The decision to stage a bowl game in New York City with a Big East team followed a 2004 announcement by the New York City Sports Commission and Big East Conference to hold the "Big Apple Bowl" at the proposed West Side Stadium, but the plan to build the stadium on the West Side of Manhattan was defeated in 2005.

On March 9, 2010, the bowl's official name was announced to be the Pinstripe Bowl, with New Era Cap Company agreeing to sponsor the bowl for four years while ESPN agreed to broadcast the bowl for six years. The inaugural game was played on December 30, 2010. The first three editions of the bowl were each won by a Big East team over a Big 12 team. In 2013, Notre Dame was invited in place of a Big 12 team; the Fighting Irish defeated Rutgers of the Big East's successor, the American Athletic Conference ("The American").

Starting in 2014, the bowl featured an Atlantic Coast Conference (ACC) team against a Big Ten team. This was the same year that New Jersey–based Rutgers, the closest FBS school in the New York City area, moved to the Big Ten, and one year after Syracuse University, based in central New York state, moved to the ACC. The ACC agreed to a six-year deal with the Pinstripe Bowl, and the Big Ten agreed to the alignment for eight years. The ACC adopted a tiered system so that the same conference position would not necessarily go to the same bowl each season. The 2014 through 2019 editions of the bowl saw Big Ten teams compile a 5–1 record against ACC teams.

The 2020 edition of the bowl was cancelled, "out of an abundance of caution" due to the COVID-19 pandemic in the United States.

On August 16, 2022, Bad Boy Mowers was announced as the new title sponsor of the game.

== Game results ==
Rankings are based on the AP Poll prior to the game being played.

Date	Winning team		Losing team		Attendance	Notes
December 30, 2010	Syracuse	36	Kansas State	34	38,274	notes
December 30, 2011	Rutgers	27	Iowa State	13	38,328	notes
December 29, 2012	Syracuse	38	West Virginia	14	39,098	notes
December 28, 2013	No. 25 Notre Dame†	29	Rutgers	16	47,122	notes
December 27, 2014	Penn State	31	Boston College	30 (OT)	49,012	notes
December 26, 2015	Duke	44	Indiana	41 (OT)	37,218	notes
December 28, 2016	Northwestern	31	No. 22 Pittsburgh	24	37,918	notes
December 27, 2017	Iowa	27	Boston College	20	37,667	notes
December 27, 2018	Wisconsin	35	Miami (FL)	3	37,821	notes
December 27, 2019	Michigan State	27	Wake Forest	21	36,895	notes
December 29, 2020	Game canceled due to the COVID-19 pandemic.					
December 29, 2021	Maryland	54	Virginia Tech	10	29,653	notes
December 29, 2022	Minnesota	28	Syracuse	20	31,131	notes
December 28, 2023	Rutgers	31	Miami (FL)	24	35,314	notes
December 28, 2024	Nebraska	20	Boston College	15	30,062	notes
December 27, 2025	Penn State	22	Clemson	10	41,101	notes

† In 2018, the NCAA vacated Notre Dame's 2013 bowl win (and other results from 2012 and 2013) due to academic violations.

== MVPs ==
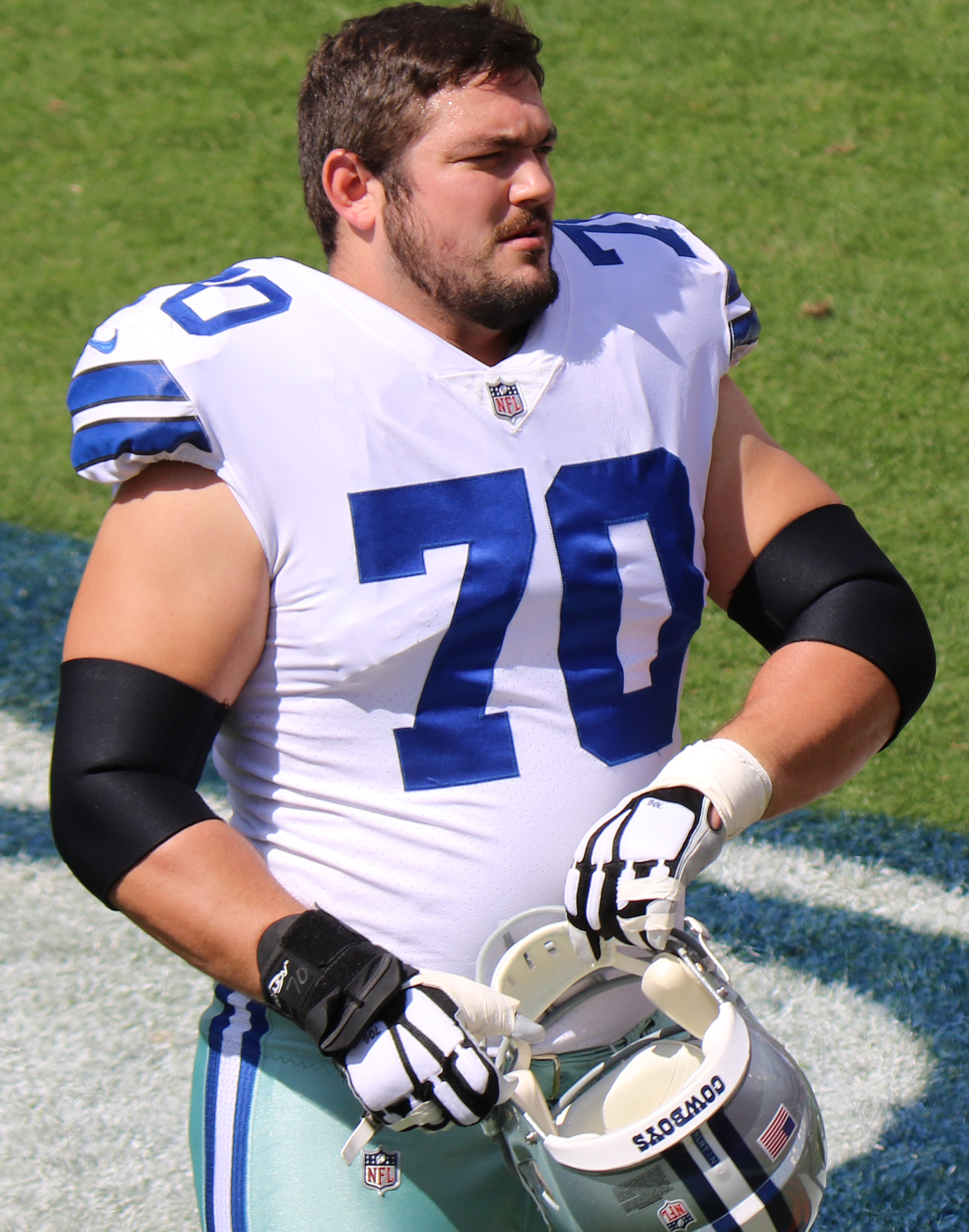
2013 MVP Zack Martin

The MVP of the bowl is presented with the Henry George “Hank” Steinbrenner II MVP Trophy.

Year	MVP	Team	Position
2010	Delone Carter	Syracuse	RB
2011	Jawan Jamison	Rutgers	RB
2012	Prince-Tyson Gulley	Syracuse	RB
2013	Zack Martin	Notre Dame	OT
2014	Christian Hackenberg	Penn State	QB
2015	Thomas Sirk	Duke	QB
2015	Shaun Wilson	Duke	RB
2016	Justin Jackson	Northwestern	RB
2017	Akrum Wadley	Iowa	RB
2018	Jonathan Taylor	Wisconsin	RB
2019	Brian Lewerke	Michigan State	QB
2021	Taulia Tagovailoa	Maryland	QB
2022	Coleman Bryson	Minnesota	S
2023	Kyle Monangai	Rutgers	RB
2024	Rahmir Johnson	Nebraska	RB
2025	Trebor Peña	Penn State	WR

== Most appearances ==
Updated through the December 2025 edition (15 games, 30 total appearances).

Teams with multiple appearances

Rank	Team	Appearances	Record
1	Syracuse	3	2–1
1	Rutgers	3	2–1
1	Boston College	3	0–3
4	Penn State	2	2–0
4	Miami (FL)	2	0–2

Teams with a single appearance

Won (8): Duke, Iowa, Maryland, Michigan State, Minnesota, Nebraska, Northwestern, Wisconsin
Lost (8): Clemson, Indiana, Iowa State, Kansas State, Pittsburgh, Virginia Tech, Wake Forest, West Virginia
Vacated (1): Notre Dame

== Appearances by conference ==
Updated through the December 2025 edition (15 games, 30 total appearances).

Conference	Record				Appearances by season		
Conference	Games	W	L	Win pct.	Won	Lost	Vacated
Big Ten	11	10	1	.909	2014, 2016, 2017, 2018, 2019, 2021, 2022, 2023, 2024, 2025	2015	
ACC	11	1	10	.091	2015	2014, 2016, 2017, 2018, 2019, 2021, 2022, 2023, 2024, 2025	
American	4	3	1	.750	2010, 2011, 2012	2013	
Big 12	3	0	3	.000		2010, 2011, 2012	
Independents	1*	0	0	–			2013

* Notre Dame's vacated victory in 2013 is excluded from win–loss totals.

- Records reflect conference membership at the time each game was played.
- The American's record includes appearances of Big East teams—Syracuse in 2010 and 2012, and Rutgers in 2011—as the American retains the charter of the original Big East, following its 2013 realignment.
- Independent appearances: Notre Dame (2013)

== Game records ==
Team	Record, Team vs. Opponent	Year
Most points scored (one team)	54, Maryland vs. Virginia Tech	2021
Most points scored (losing team)	41, Indiana vs. Duke	2015
Most points scored (both teams)	85, Duke vs. Indiana	2015
Fewest points allowed	3, Wisconsin vs. Miami (FL)	2018
Largest margin of victory	44, Maryland vs. Virginia Tech	2021
Total yards	667, Indiana vs. Duke	2015
Rushing yards	382, Duke vs. Indiana	2015
Passing yards	389, Indiana vs. Duke	2015
First downs	33, Indiana vs. Duke	2015
Fewest yards allowed	169, Wisconsin vs. Miami (FL)	2018
Fewest rushing yards allowed	43, Penn State vs. Clemson	2025
Fewest passing yards allowed	48, Wisconsin vs. Miami (FL)	2018
Individual	Record, Player, Team vs. Opponent	Year
Touchdowns (all-purpose)	3, several players—most recently: Justin Jackson (Northwestern)	2016
Rushing yards	227, Devine Redding (Indiana)	2015
Rushing touchdowns	3, shared by: Daniel Thomas (Kansas State); Justin Jackson (Northwestern)	2010; 2016
Passing yards	389, Nate Sudfeld (Indiana)	2015
Passing touchdowns	4, Christian Hackenberg (Penn State)	2014
Receiving yards	172, Marcus Sales (Syracuse)	2010
Receiving touchdowns	3, Marcus Sales (Syracuse)	2010
Tackles	15, shared by: A. J. Klein (Iowa State); Clyde Newton (Indiana); Matt Galambos (Pittsburgh); Sammy Brown (Clemson)	2011; 2015; 2016; 2025
Sacks	2, shared by: Terence Garvin (West Virginia); Dani Dennis-Sutton (Penn State)	2012; 2025
Interceptions	1, by several players	
Long Plays	Record, Player, Team vs. Opponent	Year
Touchdown run	85 yds., Shaun Wilson (Duke)	2015
Touchdown pass	86 yds., Brandon Coleman from Chas Dodd (Rutgers)	2011
Kickoff return	98 yds., Shaun Wilson (Duke)	2015
Punt return	92 yds., Tarheeb Still (Maryland)	2021
Interception return	70 yds., Coleman Bryson (Minnesota)	2022
Fumble return	11 yds., Greg Rose (Maryland)	2021
Punt	59 yds., Colton Spangler (Maryland)	2021
Field goal	52 yds., Ross Martin (Duke)	2015

== Media coverage ==
The bowl has been televised by ESPN since its inception, except for 2015 and 2024 when it was carried by ABC.
