= 2023 Miami Hurricanes football team =

American college football season

2023 Miami Hurricanes football

Pinstripe Bowl, L 24–31 vs. Rutgers
- Conference: Atlantic Coast Conference
- Record: 7–6 (3–5 ACC)
- Head coach: Mario Cristobal (2nd season)
- Offensive coordinator: Shannon Dawson (1st season)
- Offensive scheme: Pro spread
- Defensive coordinator: Lance Guidry (1st season)
- Base defense: 4–2–5
- Captains: Kamren Kinchens; Xavier Restrepo; Tyler Van Dyke
- Home stadium: Hard Rock Stadium

Uniform
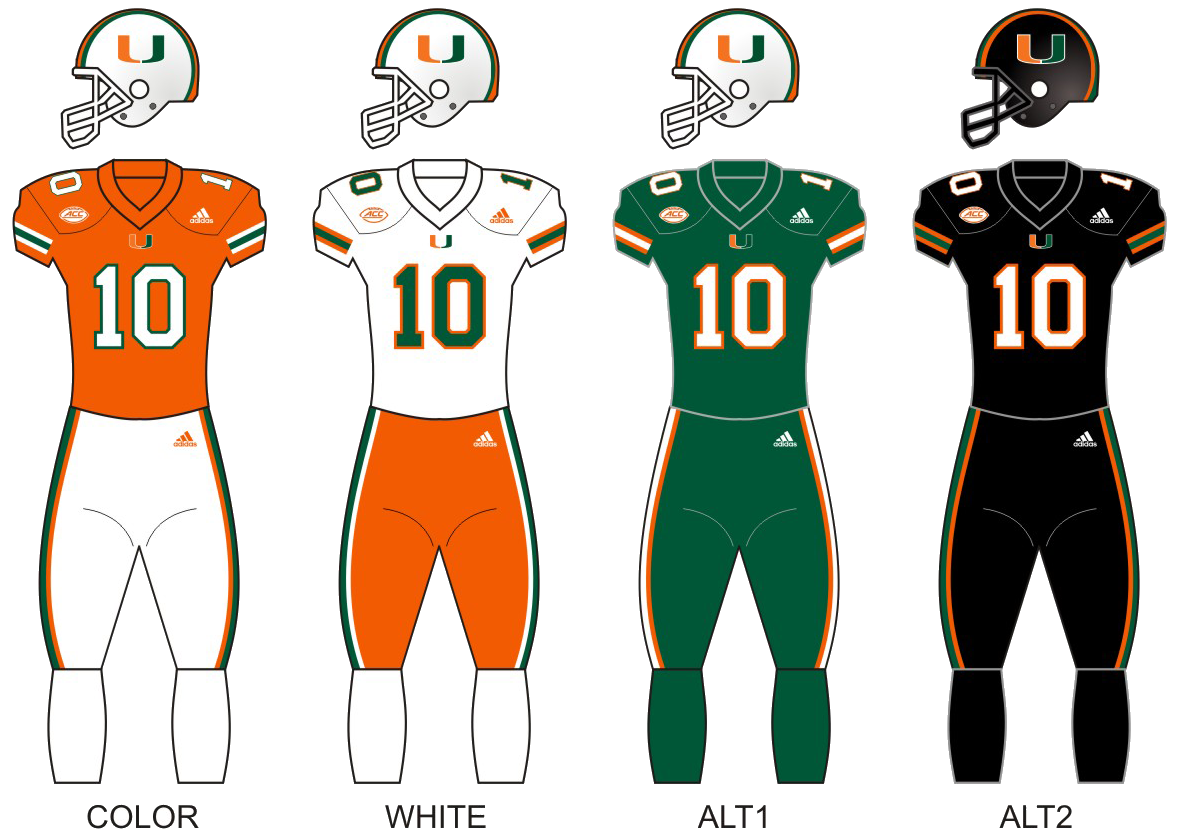

2023 Atlantic Coast Conference football standings
	Conf.			Overall
Team	W		L	W		L
No. 6 Florida State y$	8	–	0	13	–	1
No. 19 Louisville y	7	–	1	10	–	4
No. 21 NC State	6	–	2	9	–	4
Georgia Tech	5	–	3	7	–	6
Virginia Tech	5	–	3	7	–	6
No. 20 Clemson	4	–	4	9	–	4
Duke	4	–	4	8	–	5
North Carolina	4	–	4	8	–	5
Boston College	3	–	5	7	–	6
Miami (FL)	3	–	5	7	–	6
Syracuse	2	–	6	6	–	7
Pittsburgh	2	–	6	3	–	9
Virginia	2	–	6	3	–	9
Wake Forest	1	–	7	4	–	8
Championship: Florida State 16, Louisville 6
$ – Conference champion; y – Championship game participant; Rankings from AP Poll

The 2023 Miami Hurricanes football team represented the University of Miami in the Atlantic Coast Conference (ACC) during the 2023 NCAA Division I FBS football season. The Hurricanes were led by Mario Cristobal in his second year as head coach. Their home games were played at the Hard Rock Stadium. The Miami Hurricanes football team drew an average home attendance of 49,714 in 2023.

== Schedule ==
Miami and the ACC announced the 2023 football schedule on January 30, 2023.

The 2023 season was the conference's first season since 2004, except 2020, which was impacted by the COVID-19 pandemic, in which its scheduling format included just one division. The new format assigned Miami with three permanent conference opponents, while playing the remaining ten teams twice (home and away) in a four–year cycle. The Hurricanes' three set conference opponents for the next four years are Boston College, Florida State, and Louisville.

Date	Time	Opponent	Rank	Site	TV	Result	Attendance
September 1	7:00 p.m.	Miami (OH)*		Hard Rock Stadium; Miami Gardens, FL (Confusion Bowl)	ACCN	W 38–3	49,024
September 9	3:30 p.m.	No. 23 Texas A&M*		Hard Rock Stadium; Miami Gardens, FL	ABC	W 48–33	48,792
September 14	7:30 p.m.	Bethune–Cookman*	No. 22	Hard Rock Stadium; Miami Gardens, FL	ACCN	W 48–7	40,077
September 23	3:30 p.m.	at Temple*	No. 20	Lincoln Financial Field; Philadelphia, PA	ESPN2	W 41–7	17,234
October 7	8:00 p.m.	Georgia Tech	No. 17	Hard Rock Stadium; Miami Gardens, FL	ACCN	L 20–23	58,045
October 14	7:30 p.m.	at No. 12 North Carolina	No. 25	Kenan Memorial Stadium; Chapel Hill, NC	ABC	L 31–41	50,500
October 21	8:00 p.m.	Clemson		Hard Rock Stadium; Miami Gardens, FL	ACCN	W 28–20 ^{2OT}	48,562
October 28	3:30 p.m.	Virginia^{†}		Hard Rock Stadium; Miami Gardens, FL	ACCN	W 29–26 ^{OT}	58,503
November 4	8:00 p.m.	at NC State		Carter–Finley Stadium; Raleigh, NC	ACCN	L 6–20	56,919
November 11	3:30 p.m.	at No. 4 Florida State		Doak Campbell Stadium; Tallahassee, FL (rivalry)	ABC	L 20–27	79,560
November 18	12:00 p.m.	No. 10 Louisville		Hard Rock Stadium; Miami Gardens, FL (rivalry)	ABC	L 31–38	44,996
November 24	12:00 p.m.	at Boston College		Alumni Stadium; Chestnut Hill, MA	ABC	W 45–20	30,569
December 28	2:15 p.m.	vs. Rutgers*		Yankee Stadium; Bronx, NY (Pinstripe Bowl)	ESPN	L 24–31	35,314
*Non-conference game; ^{†}Homecoming; Rankings from AP Poll (and CFP Rankings, after November 2) - Released prior to game; All times are in Eastern time

== Rankings ==
Ranking movements Legend: ██ Increase in ranking ██ Decrease in ranking — = Not ranked RV = Received votes
	Week															
Poll	Pre	1	2	3	4	5	6	7	8	9	10	11	12	13	14	Final
AP	RV	RV	22	20	18	17	25	RV	RV	RV	—	—	—	—	—	
Coaches	RV	RV	23	21	18	17	RV	RV	RV	RV	—	—	—	—	—	
CFP	Not released									—	—	—	—	—	—	Not released

== Personnel ==
=== Coaching staff ===
Name	Title
Mario Cristobal	Head coach
Shannon Dawson	Offensive coordinator/quarterbacks coach
Kevin Beard	Wide receivers coach
Lance Guidry	Defensive coordinator
Derek Nicholson	Inside linebackers coach
Jahmile Addae	Defensive backs coach
Alex Mirabal	Assistant head coach/offensive line coach
Joe Salave'a	Associate head coach/Run game coordinator/defensive line coach
Cody Woodiel	Tight ends coach
Tim Harris Jr.	Running backs coach
Jason Taylor	Defensive Line coach

=== Roster ===
2023 Miami Hurricanes football team roster
Players
Coaches
Offense

Pos.	#	Name	Class
WR	0	Brashard Smith	Jr
RB	2	Donald Chaney Jr.	So
WR	3	Jacolby George	Jr
WR	4	Colbie Young	Jr
WR	5	Ray Ray Joseph	Fr
RB	6	TreVonte' Citizen	Fr
WR	7	Xavier Restrepo	Jr
WR	8	Frank Ladson Jr.	Sr
QB	9	Tyler Van Dyke	Jr
QB	11	Jacurri Brown	So
WR	12	Robby Washington	Fr
WR	13	Michael Redding III	So
WR	15	Tyler Harrell	Sr
WR	16	Isaiah Horton	Fr
QB	17	Emory Williams	Fr
QB	18	Aristides Angelo Jr.	Fr
QB	18	Riply Luna	Fr
QB	19	Jayden George	Sr
RB	20	Terrell Walden II	Fr
RB	21	Henry Parrish Jr.	Jr
RB	22	Mark Fletcher Jr.	Fr
TE	23	Jaleel Skinner	So
RB	24	Chris Johnson Jr.	Fr
WR	25	Jefferson Walls	Jr
RB	28	Ajay Allen	So
WR	35	Kolby Luna	Fr
WR	37	William Hawkins IV	Fr
WR	38	Patrick Stepelton	Fr
WR	43	Chris Pastora	Sr
OL	52	Luis Cristobal Jr.	Jr
C	55	Matt Lee	Sr
OL	56	Jonathan Denis	So
OL	57	Matt Antezana	Fr
OL	60	Zion Nelson	Jr
OL	61	Francis Mauigoa	Fr
OL	62	Tommy Kinsler IV	Fr
OL	63	Samson Okunlola	Fr
OL	64	Jalen Rivers	So
OL	68	Ian Johnson	Fr
OL	70	Javion Cohen	Jr
OL	71	Antonio Tripp Jr.	Fr
OL	72	Chris Washington	Fr
OL	73	Anez Cooper	So
OL	75	Frankie Tinilau	Fr
OL	76	Ryan Rodriguez	Fr
OL	77	Logan Sagapolu	So
OL	78	Matthew McCoy	Fr
TE	80	Elijah Arroyo	So
WR	83	Shemar Kirk	Jr
TE	84	Cam McCormick	GS
TE	85	Jackson Carver	Fr
TE	88	Riley Williams	Fr

Defense

Pos.	#	Name	Class
CB	0	Te'Corey Couch	Sr
DB	2	Daryl Porter Jr.	Jr
DL	3	Akheem Mesidor	Jr
LB	4	Keontra Smith	Sr
S	5	Kamren Kinchens	Jr
DB	6	Damari Brown	Fr
DB	7	Davonte Brown	Jr
DL	8	Josh Horton	Fr
DL	9	Nyjalik Kelly	So
LB	11	Corey Flagg Jr.	Jr
DL	12	Jahfari Harvey	Jr
DL	13	Chantz Williams	Jr
DB	15	Markeith Williams	Fr
DB	16	Robert Stafford	Fr
LB	17	Bobby Washington Jr.	Fr
DL	18	Jayden Wayne	Fr
DB	19	Jaden Harris	Fr
S	20	James Williams	Jr
DB	21	Kaleb Spencer	Fr
DB	22	Jaden Davis	Sr
LB	23	K.J. Cloyd	Jr
LB	24	Malik Bryant	Fr
DB	25	Jadais Richard	So
S	27	Brian Balom	So
DB	29	Demetrius Freeney	So
LB	31	Wesley Bissainthe	So
LB	32	Raul Aguirre Jr.	Fr
LB	33	Marcellius Pulliam	Fr
LB	34	Ryan Ragone	Jr
DB	38	Myles Mooyoung	So
DL	39	Cyrus Moss	Fr
LB	41	Chase Smith	So
LB	43	Rocky Shelton II	Sr
DL	44	Rueben Bain Jr.	Fr
DB	46	Nick Kelly	Fr
LB	51	Francisco Mauigoa	Jr
LB	53	Lucas Peterson	So
DL	55	Jacob Lichtenstein	Sr
DL	56	Leonard Taylor III	Jr
DL	58	Branson Deen	Sr
DL	59	Thomas Gore	Jr
DL	69	Trent Scheuerman	Fr
DL	81	Jared Harrison-Hunte	So
DL	84	Josh Neely	So
DL	93	Anthony Campbell	Sr
DL	96	Collins Acheampong	Fr
DL	99	Ahmad Moten	Fr

Special teams

Pos.	#	Name	Class
K	30	Andrés Borregales	Jr
LS	49	Mason Napper	So
P	86	Fred Potter	Fr
P	94	Dylan Joyce	Fr
P	97	Will Hutchinson	So

Head coach

- Mario Cristobal

Coordinators/assistant coaches

- Shannon Dawson – Offensive Coordinator/Quarterbacks
- Lance Guidry – Defensive Coordinator
- Alex Mirabal – Assistant Head Coach/Offensive Line
- Joe Salave'a – Defensive Line/Defensive Run Game Coordinator
- Tim Harris Jr. – Running Backs
- Derek Nicholson – Linebackers
- Kevin Beard – Wide Receivers
- Jahmile Addae – Secondary
- Jason Taylor – Defensive Line
- Cody Woodiel – Tight Ends

Legend

- (C) Team captain
- (S) Suspended
- (I) Ineligible
- Injured
- Redshirt

Roster
Last update: August 11, 2023

== Game summaries ==
=== Miami (OH) ===
Game One – Miami (OH) RedHawks (0–0) at #Miami Hurricanes (0–0)

Quarter	1	2	3	4	Total
RedHawks	0	3	0	0	3
Hurricanes	7	9	8	14	38

at Hard Rock Stadium • Miami Gardens, Florida

- Date: Friday, September 1, 2023
- Game time: 7:00 p.m. EST
- Game weather: Cloudy • Temperature: 86 °F (30 °C)
- TV announcers (ACCN): Jay Alter (play-by-play) and Rene Ingoglia (analyst)

Game information

First quarter

- (13:26) MIA – Colbie Young 44-yard pass from Tyler Van Dyke, Andrés Borregales kick (Drive: 3 plays, 56 yards, 1:25; Miami 7–0)
- (4:02) MIA – Andrés Borregales 34-yard field goal (Drive: 15 plays, 66 yards, 7:33; Miami 10–0)

Second quarter

- (2:33) MIA – Andrés Borregales 32-yard field goal (Drive: 10 plays, 64 yards, 5:02; Miami 13–0)
- (0:58) M–OH – Graham Nicholson 48-yard field goal (Drive: 6 plays, 44 yards, 1:35; Miami 13–3)
- (0:00) MIA – Andrés Borregales 43-yard field goal (Drive: 5 plays, 50 yards, 0:58; Miami 16–3)

Third quarter

- (11:09) MIA – Mark Fletcher Jr. 26-yard run, Xavier Restrepo–Tyler Van Dyke pass (Drive: 5 plays, 65 yards, 2:14; Miami 24–3)

Fourth quarter

- (13:43) MIA – Henry Parrish Jr. 12-yard run, Andrés Borregales kick (Drive: 6 plays, 78 yards, 2:57; Miami 31–3)
- (4:29) MIA – Donald Chaney Jr. 20-yard run, Andrés Borregales kick (Drive: 8 plays, 69 yards, 4:46; Miami 38–3)

Statistics	M–OH	MIA
First downs	9	26
Plays–yards	49–215	61–493
Rushes–yards	25–51	36–250
Passing yards	164	243
Passing: comp–att–int	13–24–0	20–25–1
Turnovers		
Time of possession	27:07	32:53

Team	Category	Player	Statistics
Miami (OH)	Passing	Brett Gabbert	12/21, 127 yards
Miami (OH)	Rushing	Rashad Amos	8 carries, 30 yards
Miami (OH)	Receiving	Gage Larvadain	8 receptions, 80 yards
Miami	Passing	Tyler Van Dyke	17/22, 201 yards, TD, INT
Miami	Rushing	Henry Parrish Jr.	9 carries, 90 yards, TD
Miami	Receiving	Colbie Young	4 receptions, 79 yards, TD

=== No. 23 Texas A&M ===
Game Two – No. 23 Texas A&M Aggies (1–0) at Miami Hurricanes (1–0)– Game summary

Quarter	1	2	3	4	Total
No. 23 Texas A&M	10	7	9	7	33
Miami (FL)	7	14	10	17	48

at Hard Rock Stadium, Miami Gardens, Florida

- Date: September 9
- Game time: 2:30 p.m. CDT/3:30 p.m. EDT
- Game weather: Cloudy, 80 °F (27 °C)
- Game attendance: 48,792
- Referee: Jason Autrey
- TV announcers (ABC): Joe Tessitore, Jesse Palmer, and Katie George
- Box score, Recap

Game information
First quarter
- (12:30) TXAM – Conner Weigman 1-yard run (Randy Bond kick) (Drive: 3 plays, 15 yards, 0:57; Texas A&M 7-0)
- (5:25) TXAM – Randy Bond 24-yard field goal (Drive: 11 plays, 76 yards, 5:04; Texas A&M 10-0)
- (2:08) MIA – Colbie Young 3-yard pass from Tyler Van Dyke (Andrés Borregales kick) (Drive: 7 plays, 75 yards, 3:17; Texas A&M 10-7)

Second quarter

- (13:11) TXAM – Amari Daniels 9-yard run (Randy Bond kick) (Drive: 2 plays, 9 yards, 0:09; Texas A&M 17-7)
- (11:06) MIA – Isaiah Horton 52-yard pass from Tyler Van Dyke (Andrés Borregales kick) (Drive: 5 plays, 75 yards, 2:05; Texas A&M 17-14)
- (0:13) MIA – Jacolby George 11-yard pass from Tyler Van Dyke (Andrés Borregales kick) (Drive: 6 plays, 75 yards, 0:44; Miami 21-17)

Third quarter

- (9:07) TXAM – Randy Bond 28-yard field goal (Drive: 12 plays, 59 yards, 5:53; Miami 21-20)
- (8:55) MIA – Brashard Smith 98-yard kickoff return (Andrés Borregales kick) (Miami 28-20)
- (5:39) MIA – Andrés Borregales 34-yard field goal (Drive: 4 plays, 6 yards, 1:25; Miami 31-20)
- (2:29) TXAM – Earnest Crownover 19-yard pass from Conner Weigman (pass failed) (Drive: 7 plays, 75 yards, 3:10; Miami 31-26)

Fourth quarter

- (12:37) MIA – Jacolby George 3-yard pass from Tyler Van Dyke (Andrés Borregales kick) (Drive: 5 plays, 31 yards, 2:23; Miami 38-26)
- (6:28) MIA – Andrés Borregales 50-yard field goal (Drive: 7 plays, 46 yards, 4:40; Miami 41-26)
- (5:02) TXAM – Noah Thomas 9-yard pass from Conner Weigman (Randy Bond kick) (Drive: 6 plays, 74 yards, 1:26; Miami 41-33)
- (2:37) MIA – Jacolby George 64-yard pass from Tyler Van Dyke (Andrés Borregales kick) (Drive: 4 plays, 80 yards, 2:25; Miami 48-33)

Statistics

Statistics	TXAM	MIA
First downs	25	16
Total yards	82–433	54–451
Rushing yards	29–97	24–77
Passing yards	336	374
Passing: Comp–Att–Int	31–53–2	21–30–0
Time of possession	32:17	27:43

Team	Category	Player	Statistics
Texas A&M	Passing	Conner Weigman	31/53, 336 yards, 2 TD, 2 INT
Texas A&M	Rushing	Amari Daniels	18 carries, 62 yards, TD
Texas A&M	Receiving	Evan Stewart	11 receptions, 142 yards
Miami	Passing	Tyler Van Dyke	21/30, 374 yards, 5 TD
Miami	Rushing	Henry Parrish Jr.	10 carries, 50 yards
Miami	Receiving	Xavier Restrepo	6 receptions, 126 yards

=== Bethune-Cookman ===
Game Three – Bethune-Cookman Wildcats (1–1) at No. 22 Miami Hurricanes (2–0)

Quarter	1	2	3	4	Total
Wildcats	0	0	0	7	7
No. 22 Hurricanes	14	20	7	7	48

at Hard Rock Stadium • Miami Gardens, Florida

- Date: Thursday, September 14, 2023
- Game time: 7:30 p.m. EST
- Game weather: Cloudy • Temperature: 87 °F (31 °C)
- TV announcers (ACCN): Jorge Sedano (play-by-play), Orlando Franklin (analyst), and Marilyn Payne (sideline)

Game information

First quarter

- (10:46) MIA – Tyler Van Dyke 10-yard run, Andrés Borregales kick (Drive: 9 plays, 65 yards, 4:54; Miami 7–0)
- (1:51) MIA – Ajay Allen Dyke 8-yard run, Andrés Borregales kick (Drive: 11 plays, 93 yards, 5:16; Miami 14–0)

Second quarter

- (11:57) MIA – Jacolby George 15-yard pass from Tyler Van Dyke, kick failed (Drive: 7 plays, 71 yards, 2:57; Miami 20–0)
- (7:34) MIA – Donald Chaney Jr. 3-yard run, Andrés Borregales kick (Drive: 4 plays, 55 yards, 2:10; Miami 27–0)
- (0:27) MIA – Brashard Smith 27-yard pass from Tyler Van Dyke, Andrés Borregales kick (Drive: 4 plays, 74 yards, 0:35; Miami 34–0)

Third quarter

- (3:03) MIA – Ajay Allen 4-yard run, Andrés Borregales kick (Drive: 11 plays, 69 yards, 6:55; Miami 41–0)

Fourth quarter

- (3:03) MIA – Chris Johnson Jr. 21-yard run, Will Rocha kick (Drive: 9 plays, 67 yards, 4:22; Miami 48–0)
- (1:19) BCU – Walter Simmons III 6-yard run, Cade Hechter kick (Drive: 10 plays, 75 yards, 5:17; Miami 48–7)

Statistics	BCU	MIA
First downs	8	32
Plays–yards	47–165	70–588
Rushes–yards	30–33	36–240
Passing yards	132	349
Passing: comp–att–int	11–17–0	28–34–0
Turnovers		
Time of possession	24:58	35:02

Team	Category	Player	Statistics
Bethune-Cookman	Passing	Walter Simmons III	3/5, 62 yards
Bethune-Cookman	Rushing	Jouvensly Bazil	7 carries, 22 yards
Bethune-Cookman	Receiving	Jouvensly Bazil	1 reception, 40 yards
Miami	Passing	Tyler Van Dyke	19/23, 247 yards, 2 TD
Miami	Rushing	Donald Cheaney Jr.	7 carries, 73 yards, TD
Miami	Receiving	Xavier Restrepo	6 receptions, 120 yards

=== Temple ===
Game Four – No. 20 Miami Hurricanes (3–0) at Temple Owls (2–1)

Quarter	1	2	3	4	Total
No. 20 Hurricanes	7	17	14	3	41
Owls	0	7	0	0	7

at Lincoln Financial Field • Philadelphia, Pennsylvania

- Date: Saturday, September 23, 2023
- Game time: 3:30 p.m. EST
- Game weather: Cloudy • Temperature: 77 °F (25 °C)
- TV announcers (ESPN2): Lowell Galindo (play-by-play), Kirk Morrison (analyst), and Stormy Buonantony (sideline)

Game information

First quarter

- (3:04) MIA – Xavier Restrepo 7-yard pass from Tyler Van Dyke, Andrés Borregales kick (Drive: 13 plays, 82 yards, 6:42; Miami 7–0)

Second quarter

- (12:11) MIA – Colbie Young 28-yard pass from Tyler Van Dyke, Andrés Borregales kick (Drive: 5 plays, 80 yards, 2:43; Miami 14–0)
- (8:09) MIA – Andrés Borregales 26-yard field goal (Drive: 5 plays, 46 yards, 1:28; Miami 17–0)
- (1:03) MIA – Henry Parrish 13-yard run, Andrés Borregales kick (Drive: 4 plays, 24 yards, 1:13; Miami 24–0)
- (0:02) TEM – Reese Clark 9-yard pass from E.J. Warner, Camden Price kick (Drive: 8 plays, 75 yards, 1:01; Miami 24–7)

Third quarter

- (11:44) MIA – Henry Parrish 9-yard run, Andrés Borregales kick (Drive: 7 plays, 63 yards, 3:16; Miami 31–7)
- (3:49) MIA – Xavier Restrepo 17-yard pass from Tyler Van Dyke, Andrés Borregales kick (Drive: 8 plays, 72 yards, 3:57; Miami 38–7)

Fourth quarter

- (11:42) MIA – Andres Borreagles 39-yard field goal (Drive: 10 plays, 60 yards, 5:14; Miami 41–7)

Statistics	MIA	TEM
First downs	24	13
Plays–yards	67–543	58–279
Rushes–yards	42–323	16–11
Passing yards	220	268
Passing: comp–att–int	17–25–0	23–42–2
Turnovers		
Time of possession	32:34	27:26

Team	Category	Player	Statistics
Miami	Passing	Tyler Van Dyke	17/24, 220 yards, 3 TD
Miami	Rushing	Henry Parrish Jr.	16 carries, 139 yards, 2 TD
Miami	Receiving	Jacolby George	5 receptions, 90 yards
Temple	Passing	E.J. Warner	22/39, 240 yards, 1 TD, 2 INT
Temple	Rushing	Edward Saydee	2 carries, 12 yards
Temple	Receiving	Amad Anderson Jr.	10 receptions, 117 yards

=== Georgia Tech ===
Game Five – Georgia Tech Yellow Jackets (2–3) at No. 17 Miami Hurricanes (4–0)

Quarter	1	2	3	4	Total
Yellow Jackets	0	0	14	9	23
No. 17 Hurricanes	0	3	7	10	20

at Hard Rock Stadium • Miami Gardens, Florida

- Date: Saturday, October 7, 2023
- Game time: 8:00 p.m. EST
- Game weather: Clear • Temperature: 82 °F (28 °C)
- TV announcers (ACCN): Wes Durham (play-by-play), Tim Hasselbeck (analyst), and Taylor Tannebaum (sideline)

Game information

First quarter

- No scoring plays

Second quarter

- (0:00) MIA – Andrés Borregales 30-yard field goal (Drive: 12 plays, 65 yards, 1:22; Miami 3–0)

Third quarter

- (6:37) MIA – Riley Williams 22-yard pass from Tyler Van Dyke, Andrés Borregales kick (Drive: 8 plays, 50 yards, 3:59; Miami 10–0)
- (3:19) GT – Haynes King 6-yard run, Aidan Birr kick (Drive: 8 plays, 75 yards, 3:18; Miami 10–7)
- (1:09) GT – Jamal Haynes 4-yard run, Aidan Birr kick (Drive: 4 plays, 26 yards, 1:26; Georgia Tech 14–10)

Fourth quarter

- (12:11) GT – Aidan Birr 27-yard field goal (Drive: 4 plays, 6 yards, 2:03; Georgia Tech 17–10)
- (10:15) MIA – Colbie Young 60-yard pass from Tyler Van Dyke, Andrés Borregales kick (Drive: 4 plays, 75 yards, 1:56; Tied 17–17)
- (6:23) MIA – Andrés Borregales 39-yard field goal (Drive: 4 plays, -7 yards, 1:59; Miami 20–17)
- (0:01) GT – Christian Leary 44-yard pass from Haynes King, two–point conversion failed (Drive: 4 plays, 74 yards, 0:25; Georgia Tech 23–20)

Statistics	GT	MIA
First downs	12	23
Plays–yards	53–250	82–454
Rushes–yards	27–99	46–166
Passing yards	151	288
Passing: comp–att–int	12–26–2	24–36–3
Turnovers		
Time of possession	24:34	35:26

Team	Category	Player	Statistics
Georgia Tech	Passing	Haynes King	12/26, 151 yards, 1 TD, 2 INT
Georgia Tech	Rushing	Haynes King	10 carries, 46 yards, TD
Georgia Tech	Receiving	Christian Leary	1 reception, 44 yards, TD
Miami	Passing	Tyler Van Dyke	24/36, 288 yards, TD, 3 INT
Miami	Rushing	Donald Chaney Jr.	23 carries, 103 yards
Miami	Receiving	Xavier Restrepo	11 receptions, 139 yards

=== No. 12 North Carolina ===
Game Six – No. 25 Miami Hurricanes (4–1) at No. 12 North Carolina Tar Heels (5–0)

Quarter	1	2	3	4	Total
No. 25 Hurricanes	0	17	0	14	31
No. 12 Tar Heels	7	7	21	6	41

at Kenan Stadium • Chapel Hill, North Carolina

- Date: Saturday, October 14, 2023
- Game time: 7:30 p.m. EST
- Game weather: Clear • Temperature: 65 °F (18 °C) • Wind: W 5 MPH
- Game attendance: 50,500
- Referee: Adam Savoie
- TV announcers (ABC): Sean McDonough (play-by-play), Greg McElroy (analyst)

Game information

First quarter

- (6:26) UNC – Devontez Walker 18-yard pass from Drake Maye, Noah Burnette kick (Drive: 8 plays, 91 yards, 3:00; North Carolina 7–0)

Second quarter

- (12:26) MIA – Xavier Restrepo 18-yard pass from Tyler Van Dyke, Andrés Borregales kick (Drive: 3 plays, 52 yards, 1:52; Tied 7–7)
- (5:17) MIA – Jacolby George 35-yard pass from Tyler Van Dyke, Andrés Borregales kick (Drive: 11 plays, 92 yards, 5:27; Miami 14–7)
- (2:05) UNC – Omarion Hampton 2-yard run, Noah Burnette kick (Drive: 9 plays, 75 yards, 3:12; Tied 14–14)
- (0:00) MIA – Andrés Borregales 28-yard field goal (Drive: 7 plays, 57 yards, 0:55; Miami 17–14)

Third quarter

- (13:12) UNC – Devontez Walker 56-yard pass from Drake Maye, Noah Burnette kick (Drive: 4 plays, 75 yards, 1:48; North Carolina 21–17)
- (8:11) UNC – Devontez Walker 33-yard pass from Drake Maye, Noah Burnette kick (Drive: 3 plays, 23 yards, 0:44; North Carolina 28–17)
- (2:53) UNC – Omarion Hampton 4-yard pass from Drake Maye, Noah Burnette kick (Drive: 9 plays, 63 yards, 3:07; North Carolina 35–17)

Fourth quarter

- (11:01) UNC – Noah Burnette 35-yard field goal (Drive: 8 plays, 39 yards, 3:53; North Carolina 38–17)
- (7:14) MIA – Xavier Restrepo 13-yard pass from Tyler Van Dyke, Andrés Borregales kick (Drive: 12 plays, 71 yards, 3:47; North Carolina 38–24)
- (3:14) UNC – Noah Burnette 23-yard field goal (Drive: 6 plays, 66 yards, 4:00; North Carolina 41–24)
- (2:17) MIA – Brashard Smith 54-yard pass from Tyler Van Dyke, Andrés Borregales kick (Drive: 3 plays, 61 yards, 0:57; North Carolina 41–31)

Statistics	MIA	UNC
First downs	28	23
Plays–yards	76–482	76–508
Rushes–yards	27–91	43–235
Passing yards	391	273
Passing: comp–att–int	31–49–2	17–33–0
Turnovers		
Time of possession	30:01	29:59

Team	Category	Player	Statistics
Miami	Passing	Tyler Van Dyke	31/48, 391 yards, 4 TD, 2 INT
Miami	Rushing	Henry Parrish Jr.	13 carries, 73 yards
Miami	Receiving	Jacolby George	6 receptions, 125 yards, TD
North Carolina	Passing	Drake Maye	17/33, 273 yards, 4 TD
North Carolina	Rushing	Omarion Hampton	24 carries, 197 yards, TD
North Carolina	Receiving	Devontez Walker	6 receptions, 132 yards, 3 TD

=== Clemson ===
Game Seven – Clemson Tigers (4–2) at Miami Hurricanes (4–2)

Quarter	1	2	3	4	OT	2OT	Total
Tigers	0	7	10	0	3	0	20
Hurricanes	7	0	0	10	3	8	28

at Hard Rock Stadium • Miami Gardens, Florida

- Date: Saturday, October 21, 2023
- Game time: 8:00 p.m. EST
- Game weather: Clear • Temperature: 79 °F (26 °C)
- Game attendance: 48,562
- Referee: Marcus Woods
- TV announcers (ACCN): Wes Durham (play-by-play), Tim Hasselbeck (analyst)

Game information

First quarter

- (3:53) MIA – Brashard Smith 80-yard run fumbles recovered by Jacolby George in endzone, Andrés Borregales kick (Drive: 1 play, 80 yards, 0:14; Miami 7–0)

Second quarter

- (8:09) CLEM – Jake Briningstool 32-yard pass from Cade Klubnik, Jonathan Weitz kick (Drive: 7 plays, 90 yards, 3:06; Tied 7–7)

Third quarter

- (8:38) CLEM – Jonathan Weitz 41-yard field goal (Drive: 8 plays, 58 yards, 4:01; Clemson 10–7)
- (2:53) CLEM – Jake Briningstool 19-yard pass from Cade Klubnik, Jonathan Weitz kick (Drive: 2 plays, 64 yards, 1:01; Clemson 17–7)

Fourth quarter

- (8:00) MIA – Colbie Young 11-yard pass from Emory Williams, Andrés Borregales kick (Drive: 15 plays, 75 yards, 9:01; Clemson 17–14)
- (1:51) MIA – Andres Borragles 38-yard field goal (Drive: 10 plays, 43 yards, 5:14; Tied 17–17)

First overtime

- (0:00) CLEM – Jonathan Weitz 31-yard field goal (Drive: 7 plays, 11 yards, 0:00; Clemson 20–17)
- (0:00) MIA – Andrés Borregales 35-yard field goal (Drive: 4 plays, 8 yards, 0:00; Tied 20–20)

Second overtime

- (0:00) MIA – Ajay Allen 3-yard run, Ajay Allen two–point run (Drive: 5 plays, 25 yards, 0:00; Miami 28–20)

Statistics	CLEM	MIA
First downs	19	18
Plays–yards	68–345	71–362
Rushes–yards	34–31	38–211
Passing yards	314	151
Passing: comp–att–int	18–34–1	24–33–1
Turnovers		
Time of possession	22:30	27:30

Team	Category	Player	Statistics
Clemson	Passing	Cade Klubnik	18/34, 314 yards, 2 TD, INT
Clemson	Rushing	Will Shipley	15 carries, 44 yards
Clemson	Receiving	Jake Briningstool	5 receptions, 126 yards, 2 TD
Miami	Passing	Emory Williams	24/33, 151 yards, TD, INT
Miami	Rushing	Brashard Smith	4 carries, 87 yards
Miami	Receiving	Colbie Young	6 receptions, 76 yards, TD

=== Virginia ===
Game Eight – Virginia Cavaliers (2–5) at Miami Hurricanes (5–2)

Quarter	1	2	3	4	OT	Total
Cavaliers	7	3	10	3	3	26
Hurricanes	0	3	14	6	6	29

at Hard Rock Stadium • Miami Gardens, Florida

- Date: Saturday, October 28, 2023
- Game time: 12:30 p.m. EST
- Game weather: Clear • Temperature: 83 °F (28 °C)
- TV announcers (ACCN): Jorge Sedano (play-by-play), Orlando Franklin (analyst)

Game information

First quarter

- (8:32) UVA – Mike Hollins 1-yard run, Will Bettridge kick (Drive: 12 plays, 75 yards, 4:27; Virginia 7–0)

Second quarter

- (10:08) UVA – Will Bettridge 22-yard field goal (Drive: 5 plays, 70 yards, 1:22; Virginia 10–0)
- (4:03) MIA – Andrés Borregales 47-yard field goal (Drive: 8 plays, 43 yards, 4:34; Virginia 10–3)

Third quarter

- (10:44) MIA – Ajay Allen 26-yard run, Andrés Borregales kick (Drive: 7 plays, 84 yards, 3:20; Tied 10–10)
- (10:37) MIA – Kamren Kinchens 29-yard interception return, Andrés Borregales kick (Miami 17–10)
- (3:58) UVA – Will Bettridge 23-yard field goal (Drive: 15 plays, 69 yards, 6:39; Miami 17–13)
- (0:10) UVA – Mack Hollins 10-yard run, Will Bettridge kick (Drive: 6 plays, 49 yards, 2:40; Virginia 20–17)

Fourth quarter

- (9:26) MIA – Andrés Borregales 50-yard field goal (Drive: 5 plays, 27 yards, 1:57; Tied 20–20)
- (4:20) UVA – Will Bettridge 32-yard field goal (Drive: 12 plays, 60 yards, 5:06; Virginia 23–20)
- (1:23) MIA – Andrés Borregales 48-yard field goal (Drive: 9 plays, 42 yards, 2:50; Tied 23–23)

Overtime

- (0:00) UVA – Will Bettridge 35-yard field goal (Drive: 4 plays, 7 yards, 0:00; Virginia 26–23)
- (0:00) MIA – Mark Fletcher Jr. 11-yard run (Drive: 3 plays, 25 yards, 0:00; Miami 29–26)

Statistics	UVA	MIA
First downs	24	16
Plays–yards	83–377	56–276
Rushes–yards	45–138	26–113
Passing yards	239	163
Passing: comp–att–int	24–38–1	20–30–2
Turnovers		
Time of possession	34:36	25:24

Team	Category	Player	Statistics
Virginia	Passing	Tony Muskett	24/38, 239 yards, INT
Virginia	Rushing	Perris Jones	9 carries, 58 yards
Virginia	Receiving	Malik Washington	12 receptions, 152 yards
Miami	Passing	Tyler Van Dyke	20/30, 163 yards, 2 INT
Miami	Rushing	Ajay Allen	11 carries, 67 yards, TD
Miami	Receiving	Xavier Restrepo	3 receptions, 48 yards

=== NC State ===
Game Nine – Miami Hurricanes (6–2) at NC State Wolfpack (5–3)

Quarter	1	2	3	4	Total
Hurricanes	3	3	0	0	6
Wolfpack	7	3	0	10	20

at Carter-Finley Stadium • Raleigh, North Carolina

- Date: Saturday, November 4, 2023
- Game time: 8:00 p.m. EST
- Game weather: Clear • Temperature: 56 °F (13 °C) • Wind: NE 4 MPH
- Game attendance: 56,919
- Referee: Jerry Magallanes
- TV announcers (ACCN): Wes Durham (play-by-play), Tim Hasselbeck (analyst), and Taylor Tannebaum (sideline)

Game information

First quarter

- (6:57) MIA – Andrés Borregales 48-yard field goal (Drive: 12 plays, 43 yards, 5:06; Miami 3–0)
- (2:17) NCST – Jordan Poole 12-yard pass from MJ Morris, Brayden Narveson kick (Drive: 5 plays, 72 yards, 2:06; NC State 7–3)

Second quarter

- (13:09) MIA – Andrés Borregales 27-yard field goal (Drive: 9 plays, 66 yards, 4:08; NC State 7–6)
- (2:55) NCST – Brayden Narveson 39-yard field goal (Drive: 4 plays, -12 yards, 2:06; NC State 10–6)

Third quarter

- No scoring plays.

Fourth quarter

- (5:03) NCST – Kendrick Raphael 31-yard run, Brayden Narveson kick (Drive: 8 plays, 97 yards, 4:44; NC State 17–6)
- (1:37) NCST – Brayden Narveson 19-yard field goal (Drive: 6 plays, 14 yards, 2:15; NC State 20–6)

Statistics	MIA	NCST
First downs	19	12
Plays–yards	70–292	48–231
Rushes–yards	32–119	27–108
Passing yards	173	123
Passing: comp–att–int	21–38–3	11–21–1
Turnovers		
Time of possession	35:16	24:44

Team	Category	Player	Statistics
Miami	Passing	Tyler Van Dyke	21/38, 173 yards, 3 INT
Miami	Rushing	Mark Fletcher Jr.	23 carries, 115 yards
Miami	Receiving	Jacolby George	5 receptions, 59 yards
NC State	Passing	MJ Morris	11/21, 123 yards, TD, INT
NC State	Rushing	Brennan Armstrong	8 carries, 51 yards
NC State	Receiving	Kevin Concepcion	5 receptions, 61 yards

=== No. 4 Florida State ===
Game Ten – Miami Hurricanes (6–3) at No. 4 Florida State Seminoles (9–0)

Quarter	1	2	3	4	Total
Hurricanes	0	10	3	7	20
No. 4 Florida State	7	3	10	7	27

at Doak Campbell Stadium • Tallahassee, Florida

- Date: Saturday, November 11, 2023
- Game time: 3:30 p.m. EST
- Game weather: Clear • Temperature: 67 °F (19 °C)
- TV announcers (ABC): Sean McDonough (play-by-play), Greg McElroy (analyst)

Game information

First quarter

- (7:13) FSU – Trey Benson 5-yard run, Ryan Fitzgerald kick (Drive: 10 plays, 55 yards, 4:38; Florida State 7–0)

Second quarter

- (14:09) FSU – Ryan Fitzgerald 33-yard field goal (Drive: 11 plays, 52 yards, 4:32; Florida State 10–0)
- (2:42) MIA – Jacolby George 3-yard pass from Emory Williams, Andrés Borregales kick (Drive: 11 plays, 82 yards, 6:05; Florida State 10–7)
- (0:00) MIA – Andrés Borregales 27-yard field goal (Drive: 6 plays, 22 yards, 1:24; Tied 10–10)

Third quarter

- (12:11) MIA – Andrés Borregales 51-yard field goal (Drive: 5 plays, 14 yards, 2:49; Miami 13–10)
- (9:32) FSU – Ryan Fitzgerald 22-yard field goal (Drive: 6 plays, 71 yards, 2:39; Tied 13–13)
- (5:48) FSU – Trey Benson 38-yard run, Ryan Fitzgerald kick (Drive: 4 plays, 65 yards, 1:19; Florida State 20–13)

Fourth quarter

- (11:00) FSU – Keon Coleman 6-yard pass from Jordan Travis, Ryan Fitzgerald kick (Drive: 3 plays, 10 yards, 1:24; Florida State 27–13)
- (8:22) MIA – Jacolby George 85-yard pass from Emory Williams, Andrés Borregales kick (Drive: 1 play, 80 yards, 0:11; Florida State 27–20)

Statistics	MIA	FSU
First downs	13	16
Plays–yards	64–335	62–322
Rushes–yards	34–131	31–57
Passing yards	204	265
Passing: comp–att–int	10–30–1	19–31–0
Turnovers		
Time of possession	29:20	30:40

Team	Category	Player	Statistics
Miami	Passing	Emory Williams	8/23, 175 yards, 2 TD
Miami	Rushing	Donald Chaney Jr.	12 carries, 85 yards
Miami	Receiving	Jacolby George	5 receptions, 153 yards, 2 TD
Florida State	Passing	Jordan Travis	19/31, 265 yards, TD
Florida State	Rushing	Trey Benson	16 carries, 80 yards, 2 TD
Florida State	Receiving	Johnny Wilson	5 receptions, 82 yards

=== No. 10 Louisville ===
Game Eleven – No. 10 Louisville Cardinals (9–1) at Miami Hurricanes (6–4)

Quarter	1	2	3	4	Total
No. 10 Cardinals	14	6	3	15	38
Hurricanes	14	7	7	3	31

at Hard Rock Stadium • Miami Gardens, Florida

- Date: Saturday, November 18, 2023
- Game time: 12:00 p.m. EST
- Game weather: Clear • Temperature: 67 °F (19 °C) • Wind: 10 mph NW
- Game attendance: 44,996
- Referee: Gary Patterson
- TV announcers (ABC): Sean McDonough (play-by-play), Greg McElroy (analyst), Molly McGrath (sideline)

Game information

First quarter

- (8:02) LOU – Nate Kurisky 2-yard pass from Jack Plummer, Brock Travelstead kick (Drive: 9 plays, 69 yards, 4:50; Louisville 7–0)
- (6:06) MIA – Mark Fletcher Jr. 21-yard run, Andrés Borregales kick (Drive: 5 plays, 75 yards, 1:56; Tied 7–7)
- (3:17) MIA – Xavier Restrepo 15-yard pass from Tyler Van Dyke, Andrés Borregales kick (Drive: 4 plays, 50 yards, 1:32; Miami 14–7)
- (0:18) LOU – Isaac Guerrero 12-yard run, Brock Travelstead kick (Drive: 5 plays, 45 yards, 2:49; Tied 14–14)

Second quarter

- (7:42) MIA – Brashard Smith 34-yard run, Andrés Borregales kick (Drive: 11 plays, 82 yards, 5:39; Miami 21–14)
- (0:08) LOU – Trevonte Sylvester 1-yard pass from Jack Plummer, kick blocked (Drive: 11 plays, 77 yards, 2:08; Miami 21–20)

Third quarter

- (11:28) LOU – Nick Lopez 40-yard field goal (Drive: 8 plays, 46 yards, 3:27; Louisville 23–21)
- (5:48) MIA – Mark Fletcher Jr. 1-yard run, Andrés Borregales kick (Drive: 3 plays, 55 yards, 1:15; Miami 28–23)

Fourth quarter

- (11:02) LOU – Evan Conley 5-yard run, Jeremiah Thrash–Jack Plummer 2-point pass (Drive: 11 plays, 89 yards, 4:54; Louisville 31–28)
- (5:34) MIA – Andrés Borregales 51-yard field goal (Drive: 11 plays, 42 yards, 5:28; Tied 31–31)
- (4:17) LOU – Kevin Coleman Jr. 58-yard pass from Jack Plummer, Nick Lopez kick (Drive: 3 plays, 75 yards, 1:17; Louisville 38–31)

Statistics	LOU	MIA
First downs	26	21
Plays–yards	71–470	65–486
Rushes–yards	34–162	26–159
Passing yards	308	327
Passing: comp–att–int	24–37–1	24–39–0
Turnovers		
Time of possession	30:21	29:39

Team	Category	Player	Statistics
Louisville	Passing	Jack Plummer	24/37, 308 yards, 3 TD, INT
Louisville	Rushing	Isaac Guerendo	15 carries, 93 yards, TD
Louisville	Receiving	Kevin Coleman	2 receptions, 58 yards, TD
Miami	Passing	Tyler Van Dyke	24/39, 327 yards, TD
Miami	Rushing	Mark Fletcher Jr.	17 carries, 126 yards, 2 TD
Miami	Receiving	Xavier Restrepo	8 receptions, 193 yards, TD

=== Boston College ===
Game Twelve – Miami Hurricanes (6–5) at Boston College (6–5)

Quarter	1	2	3	4	Total
Hurricanes	7	21	7	10	45
Eagles	7	0	7	6	20

at Alumni Stadium • Chestnut Hill, Massachusetts

- Date: Friday, November 24, 2023
- Game time: 12:00 p.m. EST
- Game weather: Clear • Temperature: 42 °F (6 °C)
- TV announcers (ABC): Matt Barrie (play-by-play), Dan Mullen (analyst)

Game information

First quarter

- (9:55) BC – Kyle Robichaux 1-yard run, Liam Connor kick (Drive: 10 plays, 75 yards, 5:05; Boston College 7–0)
- (2:29) MIA – Mark Fletcher Jr. 1-yard run, Andrés Borregales kick (Drive: 15 plays, 67 yards, 7:26; Tied 7–7)

Second quarter

- (12:49) MIA – Henry Parrish Jr. 15-yard run, Andrés Borregales kick (Drive: 7 plays, 63 yards, 3:03; Miami 14–7)
- (4:00) MIA – Colbie Young 10-yard pass from Tyler Van Dyke, Andrés Borregales kick (Drive: 10 plays, 69 yards, 4:32; Miami 21–7)
- (0:21) MIA – Henry Parrish Jr. 2-yard run, Andrés Borregales kick (Drive: 6 plays, 71 yards, 2:02; Miami 28–7)

Third quarter

- (8:46) BC – Thomas Castellanos 21-yard run, Liam Connor kick (Drive: 8 plays, 51 yards, 3:44; Miami 28–14)
- (2:49) MIA – Jacolby George 4-yard pass from Tyler Van Dyke, Andrés Borregales kick (Drive: 11 plays, 92 yards, 5:57; Miami 35–14)

Fourth quarter

- (8:36) MIA – Andrés Borregales 26-yard field goal (Drive: 5 plays, 36 yards, 2:27; Miami 38–14)
- (5:50) BC – Lewis Bond 2-yard pass from Thomas Castellanos, two-point pass failed (Drive: 8 plays, 75 yards, 2:46; Miami 38–20)
- (1:07) MIA – Ajay Allen 30-yard run, Andrés Borregales kick (Drive: 8 plays, 65 yards, 4:43; Miami 45–20)

Statistics	MIA	BC
First downs	27	15
Plays–yards	76–532	51–294
Rushes–yards	40–242	26–143
Passing yards	290	151
Passing: comp–att–int	23–36–0	15–25–2
Turnovers		
Time of possession	37:55	22:05

Team	Category	Player	Statistics
Miami	Passing	Tyler Van Dyke	23/36, 290 yards, 2 TD
Miami	Rushing	Henry Parrish Jr.	11 carries, 111 yards, 2 TD
Miami	Receiving	Xavier Restrepo	6 receptions, 117 yards
Boston College	Passing	Thomas Castellanos	15/25, 151 yards, TD, 2 INT
Boston College	Rushing	Thomas Castellanos	19 carries, 130 yards, TD
Boston College	Receiving	Dino Tomlin	3 receptions, 48 yards

=== vs Rutgers (Pinstripe Bowl) ===
2023 Bad Boys Mowers Pinstripe Bowl
Miami Hurricanes (7-5, 3-5) vs Rutgers Scarlet Knights (6-6, 3-6) – Game summary

Quarter	1	2	3	4	Total
Rutgers	7	7	7	10	31
Miami	0	10	7	7	24

at Yankee Stadium • Bronx, New York

- Date: Thursday, December 28, 2023
- Game time: 2:15 p.m. EST
- Game weather: Cloudy • Temperature: 52 °F (11 °C) • Wind: 8 mph (13 km/h) NE
- Game attendance: 35,314
- Referee: Justin Elliott
- TV announcers (ESPN): Drew Carter (play-by-play), Rod Gilmore (analyst), and Taylor Davis (sideline)
- Box score

Game information

First quarter

- (6:54) RUTG – Gavin Wimsatt 1 yard run, Jai Patel kick (Drive: 13 plays, 75 yards, 8:06; Rutgers 7–0)

Second quarter

- (7:37) RUTG – Kyle Monangai 7-yard run, Jai Patel kick (Drive: 6 plays, 42 yards, 4:14; Rutgers 14–0)
- (3:19) MIA – Jacurri Brown 7 yard run, Andrés Borregales kick (Drive: 9 plays, 75 yards, 4:18; Rutgers 14–7)
- (0:00) MIA – Andrés Borregales 35 yard field goal (Drive: 8 plays, 73 yards, 0:45; Rutgers 14–10)

Third quarter

- (10:33) MIA – Xavier Restrepo 30 yard pass from Jacurri Brown, Andrés Borregales kick (Drive: 8 plays, 69 yards, 4:27; Miami 17–14)
- (5:06) RUTG – Timmy Ward 0 yard return of blocked punt, Jai Patel kick (Drive: 3 plays, 6 yards, 2:17; Rutgers 21–17)

Fourth quarter

- (11:51) RUTG – Gavin Wimsatt 1 yard run, Jai Patel kick (Drive: 6 plays, 65 yards, 3:04; Rutgers 28–17)
- (2:35) RUTG – Jai Patel 35 yard field goal (Drive: 11 plays, 26 yards, 7:12; Rutgers 31–17)
- (0:27) MIA – Jacurri Brown 1 yard run, Andrés Borregales kick (Drive: 12 plays, 75 yards, 2:08; Rutgers 31–24)

Statistics	RUT	MIA
First downs	17	22
Plays–yards	60-292	63-311
Rushes–yards	208	130
Passing yards	84	181
Passing: comp–att–int	7-15-0	20-31-1
Turnovers		
Time of possession	34:26	25:34

Team	Category	Player	Statistics
Rutgers	Passing	Gavin Wimsatt	7/15, 84 yards
Rutgers	Rushing	Kyle Monangai	163 yards, 1 TD
Rutgers	Receiving	Christian Dremel	1 Rec, 23 yards
Miami (FL)	Passing	Jacurri Brown	20/31, 181 yards, 1 TD, 1 INT
Miami (FL)	Rushing	Jacurri Brown	15 carries, 57 yards, 2 TD
Miami (FL)	Receiving	Xavier Restrepo	11 catches, 99 yards, 1 TD

== Players drafted into the NFL ==
Round	Pick	Player	Position	NFL Club
3	99	Kamren Kinchens	S	Los Angeles Rams
7	226	Jaden Davis	CB	Arizona Cardinals
7	237	Matt Lee	C	Cincinnati Bengals
7	242	James Williams	S	Tennessee Titans
