= 2023 Pinstripe Bowl =

Postseason college football bowl game

2023 Bad Boy Mowers Pinstripe Bowl
- 13th Pinstripe Bowl
Rutgers Scarlet Knights	Miami Hurricanes
(6–6)	(7–5)
Big Ten	ACC
31	24
Head coach: Greg Schiano	Head coach: Mario Cristobal
	1	2	3	4	Total
Rutgers	7	7	7	10	31
Miami	0	10	7	7	24
- Date: December 28, 2023
- Season: 2023
- Stadium: Yankee Stadium
- Location: Bronx, New York
- MVP: Kyle Monangai (RB, Rutgers)
- Favorite: Miami by 2.5
- Referee: Justin Elliott (Pac-12)
- Halftime show: Band of the Hour, Marching Scarlet Knights
- Attendance: 35,314

United States TV coverage
- Network: ESPN; ESPN Radio
- Announcers: Drew Carter (play-by-play), Rod Gilmore (analyst), and Taylor Davis (sideline) (ESPN); Mike Corey (play-by-play) and Harry Douglas (analyst) (ESPN Radio)

International TV coverage
- Network: ESPN Brazil
- Announcers: ESPN Brazil: Conrado Giulietti (play-by-play) and Weinny Eirado (analyst)

The 2023 Pinstripe Bowl was a college football bowl game played on December 28, 2023, at Yankee Stadium in Bronx, New York. The 13th annual Pinstripe Bowl featured the Rutgers Scarlet Knights from the Big Ten Conference and the Miami Hurricanes from the Atlantic Coast Conference (ACC). The game began at approximately 2:15 p.m. EST and was aired on ESPN. The Pinstripe Bowl is one of the 2023–24 bowl games concluding the 2023 FBS football season. The game was sponsored by lawn mower manufacturing company Bad Boy Mowers and was officially known as the Bad Boy Mowers Pinstripe Bowl.

== Teams ==
Consistent with conference tie-ins, the bowl featured the Rutgers Scarlet Knights of the Big Ten Conference and the Miami Hurricanes of the Atlantic Coast Conference (ACC).

This was the 12th meeting between Rutgers and Miami; the Hurricanes had defeated the Scarlet Knights in all 11 prior meetings.

From 1991 to 2003, Rutgers and Miami played together as members of the Big East Conference.

Going into the game, the Big Ten representative had won the last six Pinstripe Bowls. The most recent ACC victory had been by Duke over Indiana in the 2015 edition.

=== Rutgers Scarlet Knights ===
The Scarlet Knights entered the game with a 6–6 record (3–6 in the Big Ten), having finished in fifth place in their conference's East Division.

This was Rutgers' third Pinstripe Bowl, tying Syracuse for the most appearances in the game. The Scarlet Knights previously won the 2011 edition and lost the 2013 edition.

=== Miami Hurricanes ===
The Hurricanes entered the game with a 7–5 record (3–5 in the ACC), tied for ninth place in their conference.

This was Miami's second Pinstripe Bowl; the Hurricanes previously lost the 2018 edition.

== Game summary ==
2023 Bad Boy Mowers Pinstripe Bowl

Quarter	1	2	3	4	Total
Rutgers	7	7	7	10	31
Miami	0	10	7	7	24

at Yankee Stadium • Bronx, New York

- Date: Thursday, December 28, 2023
- Game time: 2:15 p.m. EST
- Game weather: Cloudy • Temperature: 52 °F (11 °C) • Wind: 8 mph (13 km/h) NE
- Game attendance: 35,314
- Referee: Justin Elliott
- TV announcers (ESPN): Drew Carter (play-by-play), Rod Gilmore (analyst), and Taylor Davis (sideline)
- Box score

Game information

First quarter

- (6:54) RUTG – Gavin Wimsatt 1 yard run, Jai Patel kick (Drive: 13 plays, 75 yards, 8:06; Rutgers 7–0)

Second quarter

- (7:37) RUTG – Kyle Monangai 7-yard run, Jai Patel kick (Drive: 6 plays, 42 yards, 4:14; Rutgers 14–0)
- (3:19) MIA – Jacurri Brown 7 yard run, Andres Borregales kick (Drive: 9 plays, 75 yards, 4:18; Rutgers 14–7)
- (0:00) MIA – Andres Borregales 35 yard field goal (Drive: 8 plays, 73 yards, 0:45; Rutgers 14–10)

Third quarter

- (10:33) MIA – Xavier Restrepo 30 yard pass from Jacurri Brown, Andres Borregales kick (Drive: 8 plays, 69 yards, 4:27; Miami 17–14)
- (5:06) RUTG – Timmy Ward 0 yard return of blocked punt, Jai Patel kick (Drive: 3 plays, 6 yards, 2:17; Rutgers 21–17)

Fourth quarter

- (11:51) RUTG – Gavin Wimsatt 1 yard run, Jai Patel kick (Drive: 6 plays, 65 yards, 3:04; Rutgers 28–17)
- (2:35) RUTG – Jai Patel 35 yard field goal (Drive: 11 plays, 26 yards, 7:12; Rutgers 31–17)
- (0:27) MIA – Jacurri Brown 1 yard run, Andres Borregales kick (Drive: 12 plays, 75 yards, 2:08; Rutgers 31–24)

=== Statistics ===
Statistics	RUT	MIA
First downs	17	22
Plays–yards	60-292	63-311
Rushes–yards	208	130
Passing yards	84	181
Passing: comp–att–int	7-15-0	20-31-1
Time of possession	34:26	25:34

Team	Category	Player	Statistics
Rutgers	Passing	Gavin Wimsatt	7/15, 84 yards
Rutgers	Rushing	Kyle Monangai	163 yards, 1 TD
Rutgers	Receiving	Christian Dremel	1 Rec, 23 yards
Miami (FL)	Passing	Jacurri Brown	20/31, 181 yards, 1 TD, 1 INT
Miami (FL)	Rushing	Jacurri Brown	15 carries, 57 yards, 2 TD
Miami (FL)	Receiving	Xavier Restrepo	11 catches, 99 yards, 1 TD
