= 2023 Rutgers Scarlet Knights football team =

American college football season

2023 Rutgers Scarlet Knights football

Pinstripe Bowl champion

Pinstripe Bowl, W 31–24 vs. Miami (FL)
- Conference: Big Ten Conference
- Record: 7–6 (3–6 Big Ten)
- Head coach: Greg Schiano (15th season)
- Offensive coordinator: Kirk Ciarrocca (3rd season)
- Offensive scheme: Spread
- Defensive coordinator: Joe Harasymiak (2nd season)
- Base defense: 4–3 or 4–2–5
- Home stadium: SHI Stadium

Uniform

2023 Big Ten Conference football standings
	Conf.			Overall
Team	W		L	W		L
East Division
No. 1 Michigan xy$#^	9	–	0	15	–	0
No. 10 Ohio State	8	–	1	11	–	2
No. 13 Penn State	7	–	2	10	–	3
Maryland	4	–	5	8	–	5
Rutgers	3	–	6	7	–	6
Indiana	1	–	8	3	–	9
Michigan State†	0	–	7	0	–	8
West Division
No. 24 Iowa xy	7	–	2	10	–	4
Northwestern	5	–	4	8	–	5
Wisconsin	5	–	4	7	–	6
Minnesota	3	–	6	6	–	7
Illinois	3	–	6	5	–	7
Nebraska	3	–	6	5	–	7
Purdue	3	–	6	4	–	8
Championship: Michigan 26, Iowa 0
# – College Football Playoff champion; ^ – College Football Playoff participant; $ – Conference champion; x – Division champion/co-champions; y – Championship game participant; † — NCAA vacated all wins for Michigan State (4–8, 2–7); Rankings from AP Poll

The 2023 Rutgers Scarlet Knights football team represented Rutgers University in the East Division of the Big Ten Conference during the 2023 NCAA Division I FBS football season. The Scarlet Knights were led by Greg Schiano in the fourth year of his second stint (15th overall season) as Rutgers' head coach. This was Rutgers first winning season since 2014. The Scarlet Knights played their home games at SHI Stadium in Piscataway, New Jersey.

== Offseason ==
=== Coaching changes ===
On October 9, 2022, offensive coordinator Sean Gleeson was fired in the middle of the 2022 season. On January 7, 2023, Minnesota offensive coordinator Kirk Ciarrocca was hired to replace Gleeson. This is Ciarrocca's second stint at Rutgers, having served as a co-offensive coordinator in 2009 and 2010.

Andrew Aurich transitioned from running backs coach to tight ends coach.

== Preseason ==
=== Big 10 media poll ===
The Scarlet Knights were predicted to finish sixth in the Big 10's East Division.

Big 10 media poll East Division
Predicted finish	Team	Votes (1st place)
1	Michigan	248 (27)
2	Ohio State	226 (8)
3	Penn State	192 (2)
4	Maryland	143
5	Michigan State	105
6	Rutgers	74
7	Indiana	48

== Schedule ==
Date	Time	Opponent	Site	TV	Result	Attendance
September 3	12:00 p.m.	Northwestern	SHI Stadium; Piscataway, NJ	CBS	W 24–7	53,026
September 9	7:30 p.m.	Temple*	SHI Stadium; Piscataway, NJ	BTN	W 36–7	45,317
September 16	3:30 p.m.	Virginia Tech*	SHI Stadium; Piscataway, NJ	BTN	W 35–16	52,657
September 23	12:00 p.m.	at No. 2 Michigan	Michigan Stadium; Ann Arbor, MI	BTN	L 7–31	109,756
September 30	3:30 p.m.	Wagner*	SHI Stadium; Piscataway, NJ	BTN	W 52–3	40,065
October 7	12:00 p.m.	at Wisconsin	Camp Randall Stadium; Madison, WI	Peacock	L 13–24	74,885
October 14	12:00 p.m.	Michigan State^{†}	SHI Stadium; Piscataway, NJ	BTN	W 27–24	52,879
October 21	12:00 p.m.	at Indiana	Memorial Stadium; Bloomington, IN	BTN	W 31–14	43,611
November 4	12:00 p.m.	No. 1 Ohio State	SHI Stadium; Piscataway, NJ	CBS	L 16–35	53,703
November 11	3:30 p.m.	at No. 22 Iowa	Kinnick Stadium; Iowa City, IA	BTN	L 0–22	69,250
November 18	12:00 p.m.	at No. 12 Penn State	Beaver Stadium; University Park, PA	FS1	L 6–27	105,114
November 25	3:30 p.m.	Maryland	SHI Stadium; Piscataway, NJ	BTN	L 24–42	47,012
December 28	2:15 p.m.	vs. Miami (FL)*	Yankee Stadium; The Bronx, NY (Pinstripe Bowl)	ESPN	W 31–24	35,314
*Non-conference game; ^{†}Homecoming; Rankings from AP Poll (and CFP Rankings, after October 31) - Released prior to game; All times are in Eastern time

Schedule source:

== Game summaries ==
=== Northwestern ===
	1	2	3	4	Total
Wildcats	0	0	0	7	7
Scarlet Knights	7	10	7	0	24

Statistics	NU	RUTG
First downs	13	20
Total yards	201	285
Rushing yards	12	122
Passing yards	189	163
Turnovers	2	1
Time of possession	22:04	37:56

Team	Category	Player	Statistics
Northwestern	Passing	Ben Bryant	20/36, 169 yards, 2 INT
Northwestern	Rushing	Brendan Sullivan	4 rushes, 11 yards
Northwestern	Receiving	Camron Johnson	4 receptions, 45 yards
Rutgers	Passing	Gavin Wimsatt	17/29, 163 yards, TD
Rutgers	Rushing	Kyle Monangai	14 rushes, 49 yards, TD
Rutgers	Receiving	Isaiah Washington	4 receptions, 36 yards

=== Temple ===
	1	2	3	4	Total
Owls	0	0	0	7	7
Scarlet Knights	7	6	0	23	36

Statistics	TEM	RUTG
First downs	20	20
Total yards	298	452
Rushing yards	68	254
Passing yards	230	198
Turnovers	2	1
Time of possession	25:01	34:59

Team	Category	Player	Statistics
Temple	Passing	E. J. Warner	20/47, 230 yards, TD, 2 INT
Temple	Rushing	Joquez Smith	9 rushes, 45 yards
Temple	Receiving	Dante Wright	6 receptions, 67 yards, TD
Rutgers	Passing	Gavin Wimsatt	10/21, 198 yards, TD
Rutgers	Rushing	Kyle Monangai	28 rushes, 165 yards, TD
Rutgers	Receiving	JaQuae Jackson	4 receptions, 95 yards

=== Virginia Tech ===
	1	2	3	4	Total
Hokies	0	3	7	6	16
Scarlet Knights	7	14	0	14	35

Statistics	VT	RUTG
First downs	18	14
Total yards	319	302
Rushing yards	129	256
Passing yards	190	46
Turnovers	2	0
Time of possession	33:44	26:16

Team	Category	Player	Statistics
Virginia Tech	Passing	Kyron Drones	19/32, 190 yards, TD, INT
Virginia Tech	Rushing	Kyron Drones	22 rushes, 74 yards
Virginia Tech	Receiving	Da'Quan Felton	6 receptions, 84 yards, TD
Rutgers	Passing	Gavin Wimsatt	7/16, 46 yards, TD
Rutgers	Rushing	Kyle Monangai	16 rushes, 143 yards, 3 TD
Rutgers	Receiving	Christian Dremel	3 receptions, 34 yards, TD

=== At No. 2 Michigan ===
	1	2	3	4	Total
Scarlet Knights	7	0	0	0	7
No. 2 Wolverines	7	7	10	7	31

Statistics	RUTG	MICH
First downs	10	20
Total yards	257	415
Rushing yards	77	201
Passing yards	180	214
Turnovers	1	0
Time of possession	23:52	36:08

Team	Category	Player	Statistics
Rutgers	Passing	Gavin Wimsatt	11/21, 180 yards, TD, INT
Rutgers	Rushing	Gavin Wimsatt	6 rushes, 28 yards
Rutgers	Receiving	Christian Dremel	3 receptions, 85 yards, TD
Michigan	Passing	J. J. McCarthy	15/21, 214 yards, TD
Michigan	Rushing	Blake Corum	21 rushes, 97 yards, 2 TD
Michigan	Receiving	Colston Loveland	5 receptions, 75 yards

=== Wagner ===
	1	2	3	4	Total
Seahawks	0	3	0	0	3
Scarlet Knights	10	14	14	14	52

Statistics	WAG	RUTG
First downs	6	28
Total yards	106	436
Rushing yards	83	267
Passing yards	23	169
Turnovers	0	0
Time of possession	22:23	37:37

Team	Category	Player	Statistics
Wagner	Passing	Steven Krajewski	4/6, 19 yards
Wagner	Rushing	Rickey Spruill	7 carries, 36 yards
Wagner	Receiving	Kobi Ray-Reed	2 receptions, 10 yards
Rutgers	Passing	Gavin Wimsatt	12/19, 146 yards, 1 TD
Rutgers	Rushing	Kyle Monangai	19 carries, 87 yards, 1 TD
Rutgers	Receiving	JaQuae Jackson	4 receptions, 71 yards

=== At Wisconsin ===
	1	2	3	4	Total
Scarlet Knights	0	0	6	7	13
Badgers	3	14	0	7	24

Statistics	RUTG	WIS
First downs	16	23
Total yards	275	358
Rushing yards	64	213
Passing yards	211	145
Turnovers	1	2
Time of possession	27:13	32:47

Team	Category	Player	Statistics
Rutgers	Passing	Gavin Wimsatt	16/35, 181 yards, 1 TD, 1 INT
Rutgers	Rushing	Gavin Wimsatt	9 carries, 43 yards
Rutgers	Receiving	Isaiah Washington	3 receptions, 53 yards
Wisconsin	Passing	Tanner Mordecai	17/31, 145 yards, 1 TD
Wisconsin	Rushing	Braelon Allen	21 carries, 101 yards, 1 TD
Wisconsin	Receiving	Will Pauling	8 receptions, 68 yards

=== Michigan State ===
	1	2	3	4	Total
Spartans	7	10	7	0	24
Scarlet Knights	3	3	0	21	27

Statistics	MSU	RUTG
First downs	22	20
Total yards	247	306
Rushing yards	113	125
Passing yards	134	181
Turnovers	3	3
Time of possession	29:16	45:44

Team	Category	Player	Statistics
Michigan State	Passing	Katin Houser	18/29, 133 yards, 2 TD
Michigan State	Rushing	Nate Carter	20 carries, 52 yards
Michigan State	Receiving	Montorie Foster Jr.	5 receptions, 48 yards, 1 TD
Rutgers	Passing	Gavin Wimsatt	13/28, 181 yards, 1 TD, 2 INT
Rutgers	Rushing	Kyle Monangai	24 carries, 148 yards, 1 TD
Rutgers	Receiving	Christian Dremel	6 receptions, 80 yards

=== At Indiana ===
	1	2	3	4	Total
Scarlet Knights	7	10	7	7	31
Hoosiers	7	7	0	0	14

Statistics	RUTG	IU
First downs	20	18
Total yards	315	279
Rushing yards	276	153
Passing yards	39	126
Turnovers	0	1
Time of possession	37:38	22:22

Team	Category	Player	Statistics
Rutgers	Passing	Gavin Wimsatt	5/12, 39 yards
Rutgers	Rushing	Gavin Wimsatt	16 carries, 143 yards, 3 TD
Rutgers	Receiving	Christian Dremel	2 receptions, 14 yards
Indiana	Passing	Brendan Sorsby	15/31, 126 yards, 1 TD
Indiana	Rushing	Trent Howland	9 carries, 54 yards
Indiana	Receiving	Omar Cooper Jr.	1 reception, 35 yards, 1 TD

=== No. 1 Ohio State ===
	1	2	3	4	Total
No. 1 Buckeyes	7	0	14	14	35
Scarlet Knights	0	9	0	7	16

Statistics	OSU	RUTG
First downs	15	22
Total yards	328	361
Rushing yards	139	232
Passing yards	189	129
Turnovers	1	1
Time of possession	24:23	35:37

Team	Category	Player	Statistics
Ohio State	Passing	Kyle McCord	19/26, 189 yards, 3 TD, INT
Ohio State	Rushing	TreVeyon Henderson	22 rushes, 128 yards, TD
Ohio State	Receiving	TreVeyon Henderson	5 receptions, 80 yards
Rutgers	Passing	Gavin Wimsatt	10/25, 129 yards, TD, INT
Rutgers	Rushing	Kyle Monangai	24 rushes, 159 yards
Rutgers	Receiving	Christian Dremel	5 receptions, 69 yards

=== At No. 22 Iowa ===
	1	2	3	4	Total
Scarlet Knights	0	0	0	0	0
No. 22 Hawkeyes	0	0	0	0	0

Statistics	RUTG	IOWA
First downs	7	21
Total yards	127	402
Rushing yards	34	179
Passing yards	93	223
Turnovers	1	1
Time of possession	21:38	38:22

Team	Category	Player	Statistics
Rutgers	Passing	Gavin Wimsatt	7/18, 93 yards, INT
Rutgers	Rushing	Kyle Monangai	13 carries, 39 yards
Rutgers	Receiving	Ian Strong	3 receptions, 47 yards
Iowa	Passing	Deacon Hill	20/31, 223 yards, TD, INT
Iowa	Rushing	Leshon Williams	13 carries, 63 yards
Iowa	Receiving	Addison Ostrenga	8 receptions, 47 yards

=== At No. 12 Penn State ===
	1	2	3	4	Total
Scarlet Knights	3	3	0	0	6
No. 12 Nittany Lions	0	10	3	14	27

Statistics	RUTG	PSU
First downs	13	16
Total yards	229	322
Rushing yards	99	234
Passing yards	130	88
Turnovers	3	1
Time of possession	32:00	28:00

Team	Category	Player	Statistics
Rutgers	Passing	Gavin Wimsatt	10/16, 130, INT
Rutgers	Rushing	Kyle Monangai	16 carries, 39 yards
Rutgers	Receiving	Isaiah Washington	5 receptions, 55 yards
Penn State	Passing	Drew Allar	6/13, 79 yards
Penn State	Rushing	Beau Pribula	8 carries, 71 yards, TD
Penn State	Receiving	Tyler Warren	2 receptions, 32 yards

=== Maryland ===
	1	2	3	4	Total
Terrapins	21	7	7	7	42
Scarlet Knights	3	14	0	7	24

Statistics	MD	RUTG
First downs	24	20
Total yards	498	355
Rushing yards	137	190
Passing yards	361	165
Turnovers	2	1
Time of possession	25:39	34:21

Team	Category	Player	Statistics
Maryland	Passing	Taulia Tagovailoa	24/31, 361 yards, 3 TD, 1 INT
Maryland	Rushing	Roman Hemby	15 carries, 113 yards
Maryland	Receiving	Tai Felton	5 receptions, 140 yards, 1 TD
Rutgers	Passing	Gavin Wimsatt	13/34, 165 yards, 1 TD, 1 INT
Rutgers	Rushing	Kyle Monangai	20 carries, 118 yards
Rutgers	Receiving	Isaiah Washington	3 receptions, 67 yards

=== vs Miami (FL) (Pinstripe Bowl) ===
2023 Bad Boys Mowers Pinstripe Bowl
Miami Hurricanes (7–5, 3–5) vs Rutgers Scarlet Knights (6–6, 3–6) – Game summary

Quarter	1	2	3	4	Total
Rutgers	7	7	7	10	31
Miami	0	10	7	7	24

at Yankee Stadium • The Bronx, New York

- Date: Thursday, December 28, 2023
- Game time: 2:15 p.m. EST
- Game weather: Cloudy • Temperature: 52 °F (11 °C) • Wind: 8 mph (13 km/h) NE
- Game attendance: 35,314
- Referee: Justin Elliott
- TV announcers (ESPN): Drew Carter (play-by-play), Rod Gilmore (analyst), and Taylor Davis (sideline)
- Box score

Game information

First quarter

- (6:54) RUTG – Gavin Wimsatt 1-yard run, Jai Patel kick (Drive: 13 plays, 75 yards, 8:06; Rutgers 7–0)

Second quarter

- (7:37) RUTG – Kyle Monangai 7-yard run, Jai Patel kick (Drive: 6 plays, 42 yards, 4:14; Rutgers 14–0)
- (3:19) MIA – Jacurri Brown 7-yard run, Andres Borregales kick (Drive: 9 plays, 75 yards, 4:18; Rutgers 14–7)
- (0:00) MIA – Andres Borregales 35-yard field goal (Drive: 8 plays, 73 yards, 0:45; Rutgers 14–10)

Third quarter

- (10:33) MIA – Xavier Restrepo 30-yard pass from Jacurri Brown, Andres Borregales kick (Drive: 8 plays, 69 yards, 4:27; Miami 17–14)
- (5:06) RUTG – Timmy Ward 0-yard return of blocked punt, Jai Patel kick (Drive: 3 plays, 6 yards, 2:17; Rutgers 21–17)

Fourth quarter

- (11:51) RUTG – Gavin Wimsatt 1-yard run, Jai Patel kick (Drive: 6 plays, 65 yards, 3:04; Rutgers 28–17)
- (2:35) RUTG – Jai Patel 35-yard field goal (Drive: 11 plays, 26 yards, 7:12; Rutgers 31–17)
- (0:27) MIA – Jacurri Brown 1-yard run, Andres Borregales kick (Drive: 12 plays, 75 yards, 2:08; Rutgers 31–24)

=== Statistics ===
Statistics	RUT	MIA
First downs	17	22
Plays–yards	60–292	63–311
Rushes–yards	208	130
Passing yards	84	181
Passing: comp–att–int	7–15–0	20–31–1
Turnovers		
Time of possession	34:26	25:34

Team	Category	Player	Statistics
Rutgers	Passing	Gavin Wimsatt	7/15, 84 yards
Rutgers	Rushing	Kyle Monangai	163 yards, 1 TD
Rutgers	Receiving	Christian Dremel	1 Rec, 23 yards
Miami (FL)	Passing	Jacurri Brown	20/31, 181 yards, 1 TD, 1 INT
Miami (FL)	Rushing	Jacurri Brown	15 carries, 57 yards, 2 TD
Miami (FL)	Receiving	Xavier Restrepo	11 catches, 99 yards, 1 TD

== Roster ==
2023 Rutgers Scarlet Knights football team roster
Players
Coaches
Offense

Pos.	#	Name	Class
WR	1	Famah Toure	Fr
QB	2	Gavin Wimsatt	Jr
WR	3	Chris Long	Jr
RB	5	Kyle Monangai	Jr
WR	6	Christian Dremel	Sr
WR	7	Dylan Braithwaite	Fr
WR	9	JaQuae Jackson	Sr
TE	11	Logan Blake	Fr
WR	12	Vilay Jr. Nakkoun	Fr
WR	13	Nasir Montgomery	Jr
WR	14	Isaiah Washington	Sr
QB	15	Ajani Sheppard	Fr
WR	16	Jesse Ofurie	Fr
WR	18	Davoun Fuse	Fr
QB	19	Colin O'Sullivan	Fr
RB	20	Ja'shon Benjamin	Fr
TE	21	Johnny Langan	Sr
RB	27	Samuel V Brown	So
WR	28	Naseim Brantley	Sr
WR	29	Ian Strong	Fr
RB	32	Charlie Barth	So
RB	33	Donovan Jr. Delaney	So
RB	41	Jordan Kinsler	Jr
OL	51	Curtis Jr. Dunlap	Sr
OL	54	Nick Ciaffoni	So
OL	56	Tyler Needham	Jr
OL	57	Ireland Brown	Sr
OL	59	Gus Zilinskas	Jr
OL	60	Moses Gbagbe-Sowah	Jr
OL	61	Emir Stinette	So
OL	62	Cole Kolzlowski	Fr
OL	63	Taj White	So
OL	65	Bryan Felter	Jr
OL	66	Joe De Croce	So
OL	69	Kwabena Asamoah	So
OL	70	Reggie Sutton	Sr
OL	71	John Stone	Fr
OL	72	Hollin Pierce	Jr
OL	73	Terrence Salami	Jr
OL	74	Dominic Rivera	Fr
OL	75	Jacob Allen	So
OL	76	Dantae Chin	So
OL	78	Nick Oliveira	Fr
OL	79	Mozell Williams	Fr
WR	80	Jordan Smikle	So
WR	81	Deondre Johnson	Fr
TE	82	Jordan Walker	So
WR	84	Gunnison Bloodgood	Jr
WR	85	Ben Rosenblatt	Fr
TE	86	Evan Ward	Jr
TE	87	Shawn Bowman	Sr
TE	88	Mike Higgins	So
TE	89	Victor Konopka	Jr

Defense

Pos.	#	Name	Class
DB	0	Eric Rogers	Jr
LB	1	Mohamed Toure	Sr
LB	2	Moses Walker	So
DB	3	Bo Mascoe	Fr
DB	4	Desmond Igbinosun	Jr
DB	5	Keesawn Abraham	Sr
DB	6	Shaquan Loyal	Jr
DB	7	Robert Longerbeam	Jr
LB	8	Jamier Wright-Collins	Jr
DL	9	Isaiah Iton	Sr
DB	10	Flip Dixon	Jr
DL	12	Kenny Fletcher	So
LB	13	Abram Wright	Fr
DL	14	Jordan Thompson	Jr
DB	15	Zilan Williams	So
DB	16	Max Melton	Jr
LB	17	Deion Jennings	Sr
DB	18	Fitzroy Ledgister	So
LB	22	Tyreem Powell	Jr
DL	23	Wesley Bailey	Jr
DB	24	Thomas Amankwaa	So
DB	25	Charles Amankwaa	Sr
DB	26	Al-Shadee Salaam	Jr
DB	27	Sage Clawges	Fr
LB	28	Dariel Djabome	So
DB	29	Trevor Yeboah-Kodie	Jr
LB	30	Sam Gadie	So
DB	31	Michael Robinson II	Jr
DB	32	Joey Lis	Fr
LB	33	Lance Rice	Sr
DL	35	David Onuoha	So
LB	36	Dominick Williams	Sr
DB	37	Joe Lusardi	Jr
DB	38	Timmy Ward	Jr
DB	39	Trent Brown	Fr
DB	40	Sebastian Jusma	So
DL	42	DJ Allen	So
DB	43	Andrew Vargas	So
LB	44	Timmy Hinspeter	So
DB	45	Shawn Purcell	Fr
DB	46	Kareem Lewis	So
DL	48	Kyonte Hamilton	Jr
DL	50	Jordany Augustin	So
DL	51	Troy Rainey	Jr
DL	55	Zaire Angoy	Jr
DL	56	Sean Cooper	Jr
DL	71	Aaron Lewis	Jr
DL	87	Liam Rempel	Jr
DL	90	René Konga	Jr
DL	91	Djibril Abdou Rahman	Fr
DL	92	Mayan Ahanotu	Sr
DL	94	JaSiré Peterson	Fr
DL	95	Henry Jr. Hughes	Jr
DL	96	Keshon Griffin	Jr

Special teams

Pos.	#	Name	Class
K	44	Jai Patel	So
LS	46	Sammy El Hadidi	So
LS	49	Jake Eldridge	Fr
K	93	Jude McAtamney	Sr
P	95	Flynn Appleby	So
K	97	Riley McCann	Fr
K, P	98	Michael Hartshorn	Fr
LS	99	Michael O'Connor	Jr

Head coach

- Greg Schiano

Coordinators/assistant coaches

- Kirk Ciarrocca (offensive coordinator/quarterbacks)
- Joe Harasymiak (defensive coordinator/linebackers)
- Mark Orphey (cornerbacks)
- Drew Lascari (safeties)
- Dave Brock (wide receivers)
- Damiere Shaw (running backs)
- Pat Flaherty (offensive line)
- Andrew Aurich (tight ends)
- Marquise Watson (defensive line)
- Eddie Allen (special teams assistant)

Legend

- (C) Team captain
- (S) Suspended
- (I) Ineligible
- Injured
- Redshirt

Roster
