= Shannon Dawson =

American football player and coach (born 1977)

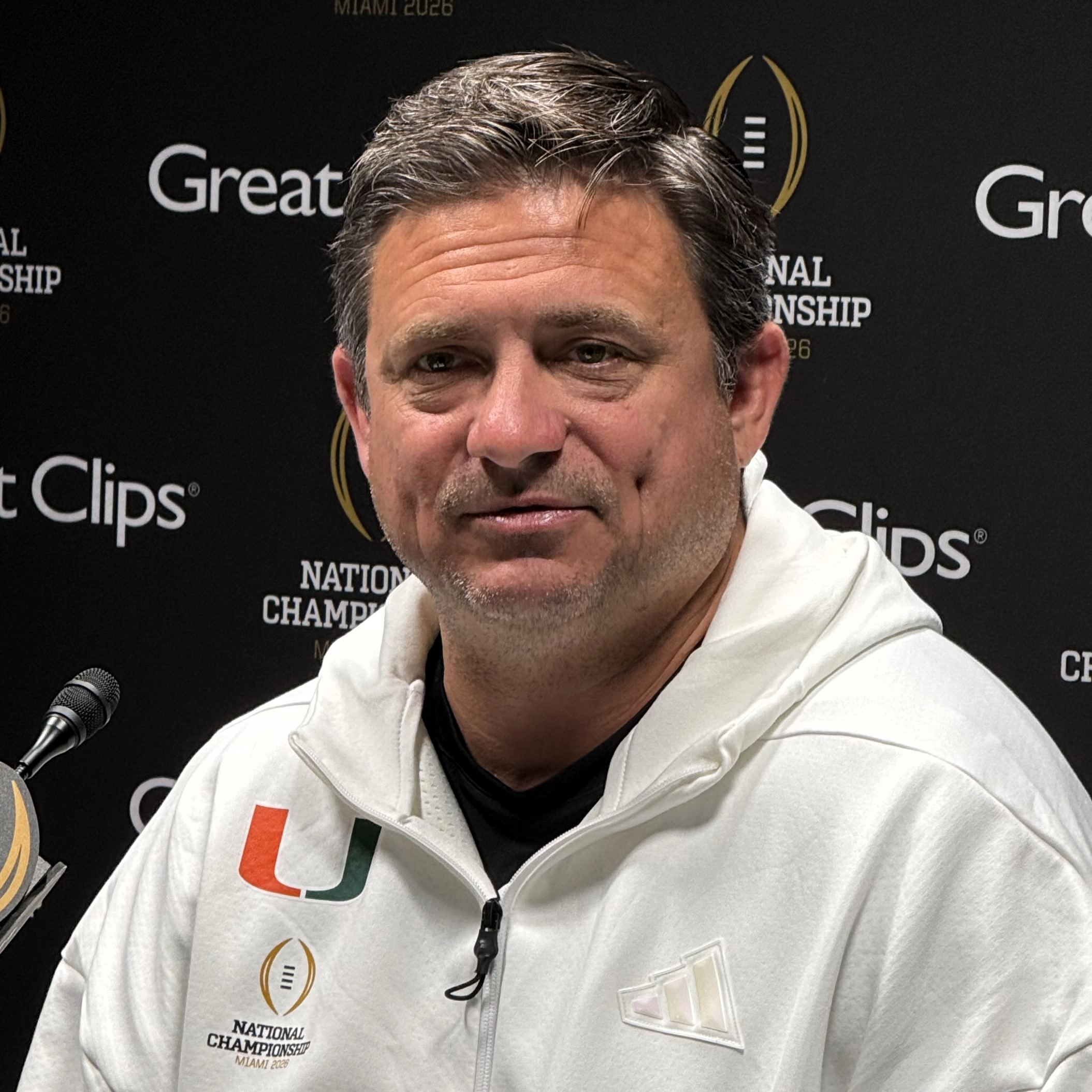
- Dawson in 2026

Current position
- Title: Offensive coordinator
- Team: Miami (FL)
- Conference: ACC

Biographical details
- Born: August 9, 1977 (age 49); Clinton, Louisiana, U.S.

Playing career
- Position: Quarterback/Wide receiver

Coaching career (HC unless noted)
- 2002: Wingate (WR)
- 2003: Southeastern Louisiana (OQC)
- 2004: Southeastern Louisiana (RB)
- 2005: New Mexico State (GA)
- 2006–2007: Millsaps (OC/QB)
- 2008–2010: Stephen F. Austin (OC/QB)
- 2011: West Virginia (IWR)
- 2012: West Virginia (OC/WR)
- 2013–2014: West Virginia (OC/QB)
- 2015: Kentucky (OC/QB)
- 2016–2018: Southern Miss (OC/WR)
- 2019: Houston (TE)
- 2020: Houston (PGC/QB)
- 2021–2022: Houston (OC/QB)
- 2023–present: Miami (FL) (OC/QB)

Shannon Dawson (born August 9, 1977) is the offensive coordinator and quarterbacks coach at the University of Miami. Previously, he has been the offensive coordinator at Houston, Kentucky, West Virginia and Southern Miss.

== Coaching career ==
=== Early coaching ===
Dawson began his coaching career as a receivers coach at his alma mater in 2002. Dawson began coaching with Hal Mumme in 2003 at Southeastern Louisiana where he was an offensive quality control coach and the team’s running backs coach in 2004. He also coached with Mumme in 2005 at New Mexico State working as a graduate assistant. Dawson went to Millsaps College as offensive coordinator and quarterbacks coach in 2006 coaching there for two seasons. Dawson moved to Stephen F. Austin University in 2008 working once again as an offensive coordinator and quarterbacks coach, he would coach there until 2010.

=== West Virginia ===
Dawson helped build some of the nation’s most prolific offenses at West Virginia, where he coached from 2011–2014, with his last three as offensive coordinator. In his final season in Morgantown, WVU ranked 12th in the nation in total offense, averaging 499.8 yards per game, and was ninth nationally in passing offense at 317 yards per contest. The Mountaineers averaged 33.5 points per game and set a school record by scoring at least 30 points in eight consecutive games. WVU also averaged more than 182 rushing yards per game.

=== Kentucky ===
Dawson spent the 2015 season as the offensive coordinator and quarterbacks coach at Kentucky after being hired away from West Virginia only to be let go after one year.

=== Southern Miss ===
Dawson would spend three seasons with the Golden Eagles as the offensive coordinator and quarterbacks coach. In his first season he mentored Nick Mullens in his senior season.

=== Houston ===
Dawson joined the Houston Cougars on Jan. 11, 2019 as the team’s tight ends coach under head coach Dana Holgorsen who coached him as a player at Wingate in 1999. In January 2020, he was promoted to offensive coordinator and quarterbacks coach. In Dawson's three seasons as Houston's quarterbacks coach, the Cougars combined to throw 87 touchdown passes (13th nationally) with a 65.3 completion percentage (19th nationally).

=== Miami ===
Dawson was hired as offensive coordinator and quarterbacks coach by the University of Miami on February 13, 2023.

In Shannon Dawson's first season as offensive coordinator, Miami's offense saw a significant improvement from the previous year. Under former OC Josh Gattis, the Hurricanes ranked 97th in scoring offense in 2022 before Gattis was fired. In 2023, the unit jumped to 39th in scoring offense despite dealing with quarterback injuries throughout the season to starter Tyler Van Dyke (Finger Injury) and True Freshman Emory Williams (Broken Arm). Although Miami finished with a 7–6 record, the offense was widely credited as having made notable progress.

Heading into the 2024 season, the Hurricanes made a major addition by landing Washington State transfer quarterback Cam Ward, who had previously declared for the NFL Draft. Projected as a mid-round pick (4th–7th round) in the 2024 Draft, Ward chose to return to college in hopes of boosting his stock. That decision paid off—he would go on to become the first overall pick in the 2025 NFL draft.

Ward in Dawson’s offense made an immediate impact. In the season opener against the University of Florida, Miami's offense exploded for 41 points and over 500 total yards in what became the Gators worst home-opening loss in program history. Ward threw for 385 yards and three touchdowns in that game alone.

Throughout the season, the Hurricanes’ offense shattered multiple school records. Cam Ward set new marks for most passing touchdowns in a season (39), most passing yards in a single season (4,313), and total touchdowns in a season (42). Wide receiver Xavier Restrepo also left his mark, finishing his Miami career with school records in both career receptions (200) and career receiving yards (2,844).

Dawson and the Hurricanes finished the season ranked No. 1 in scoring offense nationally.

Despite speculation linking him to various coaching opportunities, Dawson opted to remain at Miami for the 2025 season.
