= Jacurri Brown =

American football player (born 2003)

No. 11 – Rice Owls
- Position: Quarterback
- Class: Redshirt Senior

Personal information
- Born: September 4, 2003 (age 23)
- Listed height: 6 ft 4 in (1.93 m)
- Listed weight: 227 lb (103 kg)

Career information
- High school: Lowndes (Valdosta, Georgia)
- College: Miami (2022–2023); UCF (2024–2025); Rice (2026–present)
- Stats at ESPN

Jacurri Jayshad Brown (born September 4, 2003) is an American college football quarterback for the Rice Owls. He previously played for the Miami Hurricanes and UCF Knights.

== Early life ==
Brown attended Lowndes High School in Valdosta, Georgia. As a senior, he had 1,537 passing yards, 1,101 rushing yards and 30 combined touchdowns. He committed to play college football at the University of Miami.

== College career ==
=== Miami ===
Brown entered his true freshman season at Miami in 2022 as the third-string quarterback behind Tyler Van Dyke and Jake Garcia. He made his collegiate debut in the season-opening victory against Bethune–Cookman. Brown was subsequently used in designated running formations and occasionally lined up at wide receiver to earn playing time. Following a Week 7 loss against Duke, in which Van Dyke suffered a shoulder injury, Brown was elevated to the primary backup behind Garcia. After Van Dyke re-aggravated the injury against Florida State two weeks later and Garcia struggled in relief, Brown was named the starter for the following game against Georgia Tech. He completed 14 of 19 passes for 136 yards and three touchdowns while rushing for 87 yards on 19 carries in a 35–14 victory. He remained the starter the following week against Clemson, but was replaced by Garcia after completing six of 13 passes for 53 yards with an interception. Brown appeared in nine games and made two starts, completing 27 of 45 passes for 230 yards with three touchdowns and three interceptions, while rushing for 221 yards and recording one reception for nine yards.

Brown returned for the 2023 season as the third-string quarterback behind Van Dyke and true freshman Emory Williams. He did not appear during the regular season, preserving his redshirt, before being named the starter for Miami's bowl game against Rutgers in the 2023 Pinstripe Bowl at Yankee Stadium, following Van Dyke's decision to enter the transfer portal and Williams' injury. He completed 20 of 31 passes for 181 yards and a touchdown with an interception, while rushing for 57 yards and two touchdowns in a 31–24 loss. With Van Dyke transferring to Wisconsin, Brown was expected to compete for the starting job in 2024. However, Miami added Cam Ward and Reese Poffenbarger during the winter transfer window. On April 16, 2024, Brown entered the NCAA transfer portal and subsequently transferred to the University of Central Florida (UCF).

=== UCF ===
Brown entered his first season at UCF as the backup to KJ Jefferson, competing with EJ Colson and Dylan Rizk for playing time. He made his Knights debut in the season-opening victory against New Hampshire, throwing for 21 yards and rushing for 60 yards. After UCF's 3–2, Jefferson was benched and Colson was named the starter ahead of the game against Cincinnati. Brown replaced Colson due to ineffectiveness and completed 13 of 20 passes for 207 yards and a touchdown in a 19–13 loss. He was named the starter the following week against No. 9 Iowa State, completing eight of 20 passes for 62 yards with two interceptions while rushing for 154 yards and two touchdowns on 13 carries in a 38–35 loss. Brown started the following week against No. 11 BYU, completing eight of 17 passes for 96 yards with two interceptions before being replaced by Rizk in a 37–24 loss. He played sparingly over the remaining four games. Brown appeared in nine games and made two starts, completing 35 of 67 passes for 398 yards and one touchdown with four interceptions, while rushing for 401 yards and four touchdowns.

Brown returned for the 2025 season but entered the season as the third-string quarterback behind Cam Fancher and Tayven Jackson. He was elevated to second string after Fancher suffered an injury in the season-opening victory against Jacksonville State. Brown made his season debut in Week 2 against North Carolina A&T, completing two of three passes for 15 yards while rushing for 106 yards and two touchdowns, including scoring runs of 60 and 15 yards, in a 68–7 victory. In Week 4 against the Kansas State, Brown replaced an injured Jackson but threw an interception on his first pass attempt. On the following series, he connected with DJ Black for an 82-yard touchdown pass before Jackson returned to the contest. Brown suffered a shoulder injury during the game, which proved to be his final appearance of the season. He finished the season appearing in three games, completing three of five passes for 97 yards and a touchdown with one interception, while rushing for 142 yards and two touchdowns. The Knights finished the season with a 5–7 record, and on December 5, 2025, Brown entered the transfer portal for the second time.

=== Rice ===
Brown began the 2026 season as the starting quarterback ahead of Gael Ochoa and Patrick Crayton Jr. In the season opener against Houston Christian, he completed three of six passes for 18 yards and a touchdown and rushed for 98 yards in the victory, marking his first win as a starting quarterback since 2022. Following a loss to Tulsa, in which Brown rushed for a career-high 155 yards on 11 carries and two touchdowns, the Owls fell to 1–6. The following week, Ochoa was named the starter ahead of the Florida Atlantic game, with Brown sidelined by an ankle injury. Ochoa retained the starting role against North Texas, while Brown made his first career start at wide receiver as he transitioned to the position, continuing to see limited action at quarterback in designated formations. In Week 11 against Temple, Brown caught the game-winning touchdown on a 30-yard pass from Crayton Jr. in the final seconds of a 31–27 victory.

=== Statistics ===
Year	Team	Games			Passing								Rushing				Receiving			
Year	Team	GP	GS	Record (Note: Accounts for only GS as a QB. Brown has also started at WR.)	Cmp	Att	Pct	Yds	Y/A	TD	Int	Rtg	Att	Yds	Avg	TD	Rec	Yds	Avg	TD
2022	Miami	8	2	1–1	27	45	60.0	230	5.1	3	3	111.6	53	221	4.2	0	1	9	9.0	0
2023	Miami	1	1	0–1	20	31	64.5	181	5.8	1	1	117.8	15	57	3.8	2	0	0	0.0	0
2024	UCF	9	2	0–2	35	67	52.2	398	5.9	1	4	95.1	53	401	7.6	4	0	0	0.0	0
2025	UCF	3	0	—	3	5	60.0	97	19.4	1	1	249.0	16	142	8.9	2	0	0	0.0	0
2026	Rice	9	8	1–6	40	83	48.2	478	5.8	3	2	103.7	126	691	5.5	6	3	59	19.7	0
Career		30	13	2–10	125	231	54.1	1,384	6.0	9	11	107.8	263	1,512	5.7	14	4	68	17.0	0
