= Jacolby =

Jacolby is a given name. Notable people with the name include:

- Jacolby Criswell (born 2001), American football player
- Jacolby George (born 2003), American football player
- Jacolby Satterwhite (born 1986), American artist
