= Confusion Bowl =

College football game

- Miami RedHawks Miami Hurricanes
- Sport: Football
- First meeting: October 26, 1945; Miami (FL), 27–13
- Latest meeting: September 1, 2023; Miami (FL), 38–3
- Next meeting: None scheduled

Statistics
- Total meetings: 4
- All-time series: Miami (FL), 4–0
- Largest victory: Miami (FL), 54–3 (1987)
- Longest win streak: Miami (FL), 4 (1945–present)
- Current win streak: Miami (FL), 4 (1945–present)

The Confusion Bowl is a nickname given to college football games played between the Miami RedHawks (formerly known as the Miami Redskins) of Miami University in Oxford, Ohio and the Miami Hurricanes of the University of Miami in Coral Gables, Florida. The schools, who have met four times, share the name "Miami", leading the midwestern school to be referred to as "Miami of Ohio" and the Florida school to be regularly indicated in publications and polls as "Miami (FL)".

Locations of Miami (OH) and Miami (FL)

== History ==
Both universities have prestigious histories in college football, with Miami of Ohio's Redskins/RedHawks having produced some of the most successful football coaches of all time, earning it the nickname of the Cradle of Coaches, and the Hurricanes of Miami, Florida having won five national championships.

Although the two institutions share names, they have different namesakes. Miami University derives its name from its location in the Miami Valley area of Ohio, which was historically the homeland of the indigenous Miami people. The University of Miami gets its name from the city of Miami, Florida, which traces its own name back to Mayaimi, the historic name of Lake Okeechobee and the indigenous people that settled around it. The two Native American tribes have no relation to one another, and the similarity between their names is coincidental.

Concerns over confusion between the two universities predates the football games and began with the founding of the Florida institution in the 1920s. Alfred H. Upham, president of Miami University from 1928 to 1945, published a protest in the Ohio university's bulletin in February 1927. Upham wrote:

Presumably names of collegiate institutions are not copyrighted and these good citizens of Florida have the legal right to adopt such a name as they choose. But they certainly have not much moral right to usurp the name of a university which has established itself by more than a century of sound scholarship and effective educational service. . . . There are so many perfectly good names for a new and aspiring university. What justification or justice is there in appropriating one that has made its place in the academic world through more than a century of achievement?

The first football game between the schools was held in 1945 at Miami, Florida, and was dubbed the "Confusion Bowl" by The Atlanta Journal. The name gained traction as other newspapers also began calling the game the "Confusion Bowl", including the Logan Daily News and The Dayton Daily News. Miami (FL) won the 1945 game, 27–13, snapping Miami of Ohio's five-game winning streak.

When the Miami football teams played again in 1946, the name "Confusion Bowl" continued to be used, with the Daily News having a section of their newspaper titled "Miami, O., 'Confusion Bowl' Loser" after Miami of Ohio again lost to the Miami Hurricanes, 20–17, in Florida.

The programs met again in 1987, and the Confusion Bowl monicker stuck, with Gannett's newswire joking "The lock of the week is that Miami is going to lose on Saturday". The Hurricanes won again, this time by a convincing 54–3 score, and went on to win the 1987 national championship.

The teams met again in the 2023 season opener. As a solution to the confusion, Miami of Ohio's veteran broadcaster Steve Baker said he would avoid references to "Miami" and instead refer to the RedHawks and Hurricanes.

== Game results ==
Miami OH victories	Miami FL victories

No.	Date	Location	Winning team		Losing team	
1	October 26, 1945	Miami, FL	Miami FL	27	Miami OH	13
2	November 8, 1946	Miami, FL	Miami FL	20	Miami OH	17
3	November 7, 1987	Miami, FL	Miami FL	54	Miami OH	3
4	September 1, 2023	Miami Gardens, FL	Miami FL	38	Miami OH	3
Series: Miami FL leads 4–0
