= Emory Williams (American football) =

American football player

No. 9 – East Carolina Pirates
- Position: Quarterback
- Class: (redshirt) Junior

Personal information
- Listed height: 6 ft 5 in (1.96 m)
- Listed weight: 225 lb (102 kg)

Career information
- High school: Milton (Milton, Florida)
- College: Miami (2023–2025); East Carolina (2026–present)
- Stats at ESPN

Emory Williams is an American college football quarterback for the East Carolina Pirates. He previously played for the Miami Hurricanes.

== Early life ==
Williams attended Milton High School in Milton, Florida. As a junior, he completed 63% of his passing attempts for 2,168 yards and 16 touchdowns with three interceptions, while also adding four touchdowns on the ground. As a senior Williams he completed 161 of his 257 pass attempts for 2,049 yards and 21 touchdowns with just four interceptions. He committed to play college football at the University of Miami.

== College career ==
Williams entered the 2023 season as the Hurricanes third-string quarterback. In the 2023 season opener, he made his college debut where he completed all three of his passes for 42 yards in a win over Miami (Ohio). In week 3, Williams went nine for 11 on pass attempts for 102 yards in a win over Bethune-Cookman, after which he assumed the role as the team's backup quarterback. He was named the team's starting quarterback for their week 8 matchup versus Clemson after starter Tyler Van Dyke was ruled out with an injury. In their matchup against Clemson, Williams completed 24 of his 33 passes for 151 yards and a touchdown, with an interception in a 28–20 double overtime win over Clemson.

On January 21, 2026, Williams announced that he would be transferring to play for the East Carolina Pirates.

=== Statistics ===
Year	Team	Games			Passing								Rushing			
Year	Team	GP	GS	Record	Cmp	Att	Pct	Yds	Y/A	TD	Int	Rtg	Att	Yds	Avg	TD
2023	Miami	5	2	1–1	44	71	62.0	470	6.6	3	1	128.7	7	−17	−2.4	0
2024	Miami	2	0	—	16	26	61.5	187	7.2	1	1	127.0	0	0	0.0	0
2025	Miami	5	0	—	13	19	68.4	156	8.2	0	0	137.4	4	19	4.8	0
2026	East Carolina	5	3	2–1	68	104	65.4	655	6.3	7	2	136.7	28	54	1.9	1
Career		17	5	3–2	141	220	64.1	1,468	6.7	11	4	133.0	39	56	1.4	1
