= Jacolby George =

American football player (born 2003)

Profile
- Position: Wide receiver

Personal information
- Born: January 25, 2003 (age 23); Lauderhill, Florida, U.S.
- Listed height: 5 ft 11 in (1.80 m)
- Listed weight: 172 lb (78 kg)

Career information
- High school: Plantation (Plantation, Florida)
- College: Miami (2021–2024)
- NFL draft: 2025: undrafted

Career history
- Carolina Panthers (2025)*
- * Offseason or practice squad member only

Awards and highlights
- Third-team All-ACC (2023)
- Stats at Pro Football Reference

Jacolby George (born January 25, 2003) is an American professional football wide receiver. He played college football for the Miami Hurricanes.

== Early life ==
George attended Plantation High School in Plantation, Florida. He was rated as a four-star recruit and committed to play college football for the Miami Hurricanes over offers from schools such as Georgia Tech, Penn State, Pittsburgh, UCF and West Virginia.

== College career ==
In his first two collegiate seasons in 2021 and 2022, George appeared in 16 games, where he totaled 20 receptions for 313 yards and a touchdown. In week 2 of the 2023 season, he caught three touchdowns as he helped the Hurricanes beat Texas A&M. In week 11, George tallied five receptions for 153 yards and two touchdowns in a loss to Florida State. He finished the 2023 season with 57 receptions for 864 yards and eight touchdowns, earning third-team all-Atlantic Coast Conference (ACC) honors. In week 2 of the 2024 season, George hauled in six receptions for 109 yards and a touchdown in a win over Ball State.

== Professional career ==
Pre-draft measurables
Height	Weight	Arm length	Hand span	40-yard dash	10-yard split	20-yard split	Three-cone drill	Vertical jump	Broad jump
5 ft 11 in (1.80 m)	172 lb (78 kg)	31 3/8 in (0.80 m)	9 1/2 in (0.24 m)	4.64 s	1.62 s	2.64 s	6.77 s	36.0 in (0.91 m)	10 ft 2 in (3.10 m)
All values from NFL Combine/Pro Day

On May 8, 2025, George signed with the Carolina Panthers as an undrafted free agent after going unselected in the 2025 NFL draft. He was waived on August 25.
