= Jawan Jamison =

American football player (born 1991)

No. 44, 47
- Position: Running back

Personal information
- Born: November 23, 1991 (age 34); Starke, Florida, U.S.
- Listed height: 5 ft 7 in (1.70 m)
- Listed weight: 203 lb (92 kg)

Career information
- High school: Jacksonville (FL) Bolles
- College: Rutgers
- NFL draft: 2013: 7th round, 228th overall pick

Career history
- Washington Redskins (2013); Pittsburgh Steelers (2014)*; Bismarck Bucks (2017)
- * Offseason or practice squad member only

Awards and highlights
- Second-team All-Big East (2012)
- Stats at Pro Football Reference

Jawan Jamison (born November 23, 1991) is an American former football running back. He played college football for Rutgers University. He was selected in the seventh round of the 2013 NFL draft by the Washington Redskins.

== Early life ==
Jamison attended The Bolles School in Jacksonville, Florida, where he played football and ran track. He was teammates with John Theus. He led Bolles to back-to-back Florida Class 2A state championships in 2008 and 2009. As a senior; Jamison rushed for over 1,700 yards and scored 17 touchdowns.

In track & field, Jamison was a standout sprinter. He posted a personal-best time of 10.87 seconds in the 100 meters. He was also a member of the 4 × 100 m (42.79 s) relay squad.

Considered a three-star recruit by Rivals.com, he was rated as the 21st all-purpose back in the nation. He accepted a scholarship from Rutgers over offers from Florida Atlantic and Northern Illinois.

== College career ==
Jamison redshirted his first year and spent his time on the scout team. As a redshirt freshman in 2011, Jamison rushed for 897 yards on 231 carries with nine touchdowns. He was the MVP of the 2011 Pinstripe Bowl after rushing for 131 yards on 27 carries with two touchdowns. As a redshirt sophomore in 2012, he rushed for 1,054 yards on 242 carries four touchdowns. Jamison elected to not finish two years of eligibility and enter the 2013 NFL draft. Most draft boards have Jamison projected as a third round pick.

== Professional career ==
=== Pre-draft ===
Jamison was considered one of the best running backs in his class.

Pre-draft measurables
Height	Weight	Arm length	Hand span	40-yard dash	10-yard split	20-yard split	Vertical jump	Broad jump	Bench press
5 ft 8 in (1.73 m)	203 lb (92 kg)	29 in (0.74 m)	8 3/8	4.68 s	1.63 s	2.60 s	29 in (0.74 m)	9 ft 2 in (2.79 m)	20 reps
All values from NFL Combine.

=== Washington Redskins ===
Jamison was selected by the Washington Redskins in the seventh round (228th overall) of the 2013 NFL draft. He officially signed a four-year contract with the team on May 16, 2013. The Redskins waived him on August 31, 2013, for final roster cuts before the start of 2013 season, he was signed to the team's practice squad the next day. On December 10, 2013, Jamison was added to the Redskins active roster, after a season-ending injury to running back Evan Royster. He was released on March 4, 2014.

=== Pittsburgh Steelers ===
Jamison was signed by the Pittsburgh Steelers on August 1, 2014. He was waived on August 11.

=== Bismarck Bucks ===
On January 7, 2017, Jamison signed with the Bismarck Bucks of Champions Indoor Football (CIF). Jamison was suspended on March 8, 2017, and was released March 9, 2017, appearing in just one game for the Bucks.
