= Xavier Restrepo =

American football player (born 2002)

No. 87 – Tennessee Titans
- Position: Wide receiver
- Roster status: Active

Personal information
- Born: April 12, 2002 (age 24); Statesville, North Carolina, U.S.
- Listed height: 5 ft 10 in (1.78 m)
- Listed weight: 202 lb (92 kg)

Career information
- High school: Deerfield Beach (Deerfield Beach, Florida)
- College: Miami (FL) (2020–2024)
- NFL draft: 2025: undrafted

Career history
- Tennessee Titans (2025–present)

Awards and highlights
- Consensus All-American (2024); 2× First-team All-ACC (2023, 2024)

Career NFL statistics as of 2025
- Receptions: 3
- Receiving yards: 41
- Stats at Pro Football Reference

Xavier Restrepo (born April 12, 2002) is an American professional football wide receiver for the Tennessee Titans of the National Football League (NFL). He played college football for the Miami Hurricanes.

== Early life ==
Restrepo was born in Statesville, North Carolina, and grew up in Coconut Creek, Florida. He attended St. Thomas Aquinas High School in Fort Lauderdale, Florida before transferring to Deerfield Beach High School in Deerfield Beach, Florida for his senior year. During his high school football career, he had 48 total touchdowns, 3,000 receiving yards, 2,500 rushing yards and eight interceptions. He committed to the University of Miami to play college football. He is of Colombian descent.

== College career ==
Restrepo played nine games in his true freshman year at Miami in 2020 and had one reception for 12 yards. In 2021, he played in all 12 games, recording 24 receptions for 373 yards and two touchdowns. In 2022, he played in seven games with three starts, finishing with 21 receptions for 240 yards and two touchdowns. Restrepo returned as Miami's leading receiver in 2023.

Restrepo recorded 69 catches for 1,127 yards and 11 touchdowns in 2024, finishing his five-year career as Miami's' all-time leader in receptions (200), receiving yards (2,844), receiving touchdowns (21), and 100-yard games. He earned consensus NCAA All-America first-team recognition and was a semifinalist for the Biletnikoff Award.

== Professional career ==
Pre-draft measurables
Height	Weight	Arm length	Hand span	Wingspan	40-yard dash	10-yard split	20-yard split	20-yard shuttle	Three-cone drill	Bench press
5 ft 9 7/8 in (1.77 m)	209 lb (95 kg)	29 3/8 in (0.75 m)	9 1/8 in (0.23 m)	5 ft 11 5/8 in (1.82 m)	4.86 s	1.69 s	2.74 s	4.21 s	6.83 s	17 reps
All values from NFL Combine/Pro Day

After going undrafted in the 2025 NFL draft, Restrepo signed as an undrafted free agent with the Tennessee Titans, joining his former quarterback at Miami, Cam Ward. He was waived on August 26, 2025, as part of final roster cuts and re-signed with the practice squad the next day. On November 22, Restrepo was elevated to the active roster. He made his NFL debut the next day and had two receptions.

Restrepo signed a reserve/future contract with Tennessee on January 5, 2026. He was waived by the Titans on August 31. On September 2, Tennessee re–signed Restrepo to their practice squad. On November 17, he was signed to the active roster.

== Career statistics ==
=== NFL ===
Year	Team	Games		Receiving					Fumbles	
Year	Team	GP	GS	Rec	Yds	Avg	Lng	TD	Fum	Lost
2025	TEN	2	0	3	41	13.7	15	0	0	0
Career		2	0	3	41	13.7	15	0	0	0

=== College ===
Year	Team	Games		Receiving			
Year	Team	GP	GS	Rec	Yds	Avg	TD
2020	Miami	7	0	1	12	12.0	0
2021	Miami	12	0	24	373	15.5	2
2022	Miami	7	2	21	240	11.4	2
2023	Miami	13	13	85	1,092	12.8	6
2024	Miami	12	12	69	1,127	16.3	11
Career		51	27	200	2,844	14.2	21
