= Kyle Monangai =

American football player (born 2002)

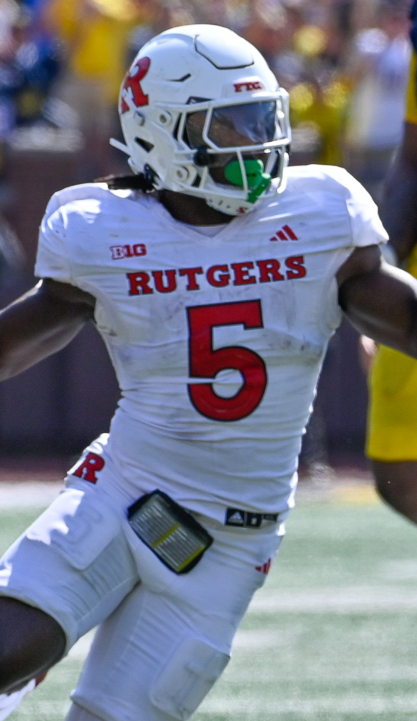
- Monangai with Rutgers in 2023

No. 25 – Chicago Bears
- Position: Running back
- Roster status: Active

Personal information
- Born: June 6, 2002 (age 24); Roseland, New Jersey, U.S.
- Listed height: 5 ft 8 in (1.73 m)
- Listed weight: 207 lb (94 kg)

Career information
- High school: Don Bosco Prep (Ramsey, New Jersey)
- College: Rutgers (2020–2024)
- NFL draft: 2025: 7th round, 233rd overall pick

Career history
- Chicago Bears (2025–present)

Awards and highlights
- First-team All-Big Ten (2024); Second-team All-Big Ten (2023)

Career NFL statistics as of Week 7, 2026
- Rushing yards: 1107
- Rushing average: 4.8
- Rushing touchdowns: 8
- Receptions: 23
- Receiving yards: 203
- Stats at Pro Football Reference

Kyle Monangai (/ˌməˈnʌŋˌgaɪ/ born June 6, 2002) is an American professional football running back for the Chicago Bears of the National Football League (NFL). He played college football for the Rutgers Scarlet Knights and was selected by the Bears in the seventh round of the 2025 NFL draft.

== Early life ==
Born and raised in Roseland, New Jersey to Cameroonian parents, Monangai attended Seton Hall Preparatory School in West Orange for his freshman and sophomore years before transferring to Don Bosco Preparatory High School in Ramsey, New Jersey. As a senior, he had over 900 rushing yards with 11 touchdowns, and 400 receiving yards with five touchdowns. He committed to Rutgers University to play college football.

== College career ==
Monangai played in five games his first year with the Scarlet Knights in 2020 and did not have a carry. He played in 11 games in 2021 and had 236 yards on 62 carries with four touchdowns. As a sophomore in 2022, he started 11 of 12 games and recorded 445 yards on 109 carries with two touchdowns. Monangai returned as a starter in 2023. He became the first Rutgers running back since Jawan Jamison in 2012 to rush for 1,000 yards, finishing the season with 1,262 rushing yards and 8 rushing touchdowns en route to second-team All Big-Ten honors. Monangai graduated from Rutgers with a degree in Supply Chain Management and Marketing Sciences in 2025.

=== Statistics ===
Year	Team	Games		Rushing				Receiving			
Year	Team	GP	GS	Att	Yards	Avg	TD	Rec	Yards	Avg	TD
2020	Rutgers	5	0	0	0	-	0	0	0	-	0
2021	Rutgers	11	0	62	236	3.8	4	10	68	6.8	0
2022	Rutgers	12	11	109	445	4.1	2	6	31	5.2	0
2023	Rutgers	13	13	242	1,262	5.2	8	8	78	9.8	0
2024	Rutgers	11	11	256	1,279	5.0	13	14	75	5.4	1
Career		52	35	669	3,222	4.8	27	38	252	6.6	1

== Professional career ==
Pre-draft measurables
Height	Weight	Arm length	Hand span	Wingspan	40-yard dash	10-yard split	20-yard split	20-yard shuttle	Vertical jump	Broad jump
5 ft 8 1/4 in (1.73 m)	211 lb (96 kg)	28 3/4 in (0.73 m)	9 in (0.23 m)	6 ft 0 in (1.83 m)	4.60 s	1.54 s	2.70 s	4.40 s	34.5 in (0.88 m)	9 ft 9 in (2.97 m)
All values from NFL Combine/Pro Day

Monangai was selected by the Chicago Bears with the 233rd overall pick in the seventh round of the 2025 NFL draft.

=== 2025 season ===
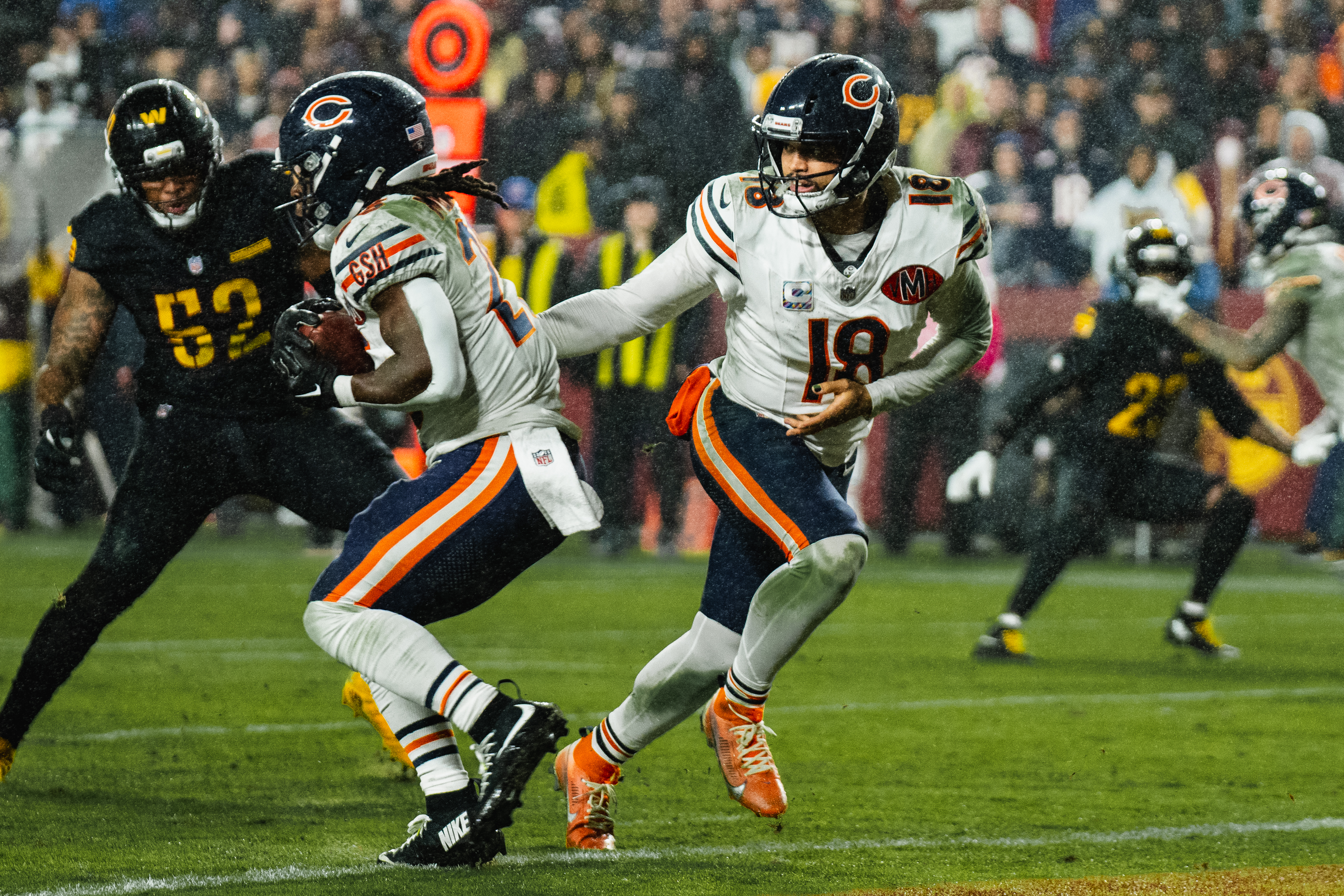
Monangai running the ball against the Washington Commanders, 2025

He began his rookie season as the backup halfback behind D'Andre Swift, seeing limited action on situational offensive plays.

In Week 7 against the New Orleans Saints, he scored his first touchdown on a one-yard run. When Swift missed Week 9 due to injury, Monangai became the starter and recorded 26 carries for 176 yards along with three catches for 22 yards as the Bears beat the Cincinnati Bengals; his rushing yards were the second most in a game by a Bears rookie behind Anthony Thomas in 2001, while the 198 total yards were the fifth highest for a rookie in team history.

Monangai and Swift began to split carries following the latter's recovery. In a Week 13 win over the Philadelphia Eagles, the duo combined for 255 rushing yards as Monangai had 130 yards and a touchdown. They became the first running back teammates to each record at least 100 rushing yards in a game since Ezekiel Elliott and Tony Pollard for the Dallas Cowboys in 2019, and the first Bears duo since Walter Payton and Matt Suhey in 1985.

=== 2026 season ===
In the first game of 2026 against the Carolina Panthers, Monangai ran for 100 yards and a 61-yard touchdown. He, Swift, and quarterback Caleb Williams recorded 291 total rushing yards and six rushing touchdowns, respectively the most by the Bears since 1984 and 1941.

Monangai recorded his first multi-touchdown game in the Week 4 win over the New York Jets, scoring twice to go with 30 carries for 146 yards. Following the game, he was ruled out indefinitely with a toe injury.

== Personal life ==
Monangai is of Cameroonian descent.
