= Gavin Wimsatt =

American football player (born 2003)

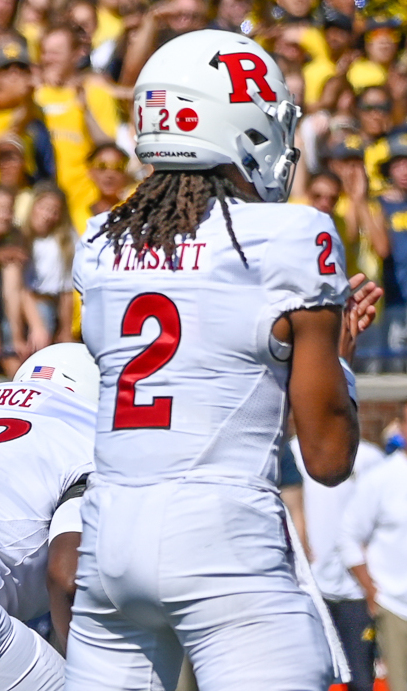
- Wimsatt with Rutgers in 2023

No. 2
- Position: Quarterback

Personal information
- Born: October 29, 2003 (age 23); Owensboro, Kentucky, U.S.
- Listed height: 6 ft 3 in (1.91 m)
- Listed weight: 227 lb (103 kg)

Career information
- High school: Owensboro (KY)
- College: Rutgers (2021–2023); Kentucky (2024); Jacksonville State (2025)
- NFL draft: 2026: undrafted
- Stats at ESPN

Gavin Wimsatt (born October 29, 2003) is an American professional football quarterback who is a free agent. He attended Owensboro High School and played college football for the Kentucky Wildcats, Rutgers Scarlet Knights and Jacksonville State Gamecocks.

== Early life ==
Wimsatt was born on October 29, 2003. He attended Owensboro High School in Owensboro, Kentucky, gaining the starting quarterback job as a sophomore in 2019. That year, he helped them have a record of 12–2 before losing in the state playoff semifinals to Frederick Douglass, earning second-team all-area honors from the Messenger-Inquirer while totaling 2,792 passing yards and 31 passing touchdowns, along with 564 yards and 12 scores rushing. He completed 54.7% of his passes on the year and only threw for 10 interceptions, and began receiving offers from major college football teams afterwards despite having only started for one season. Wimsatt was also active in playing basketball and running track, contributing to Owensboro's regional runner-up team in the former.

As a junior, Wimsatt led his team to a 12–1 record and an appearance in the state championship, being named first-team all-state by The Courier-Journal as he completed 176 of his 295 passes for 2,349 yards and 27 touchdowns, additionally running for 443 yards and six touchdowns. The Owensboro Times named him the state's offensive player of the year and Wimsatt became highly recruited, being ranked the best college recruit from Kentucky, the third-best dual-threat quarterback nationally and the 89th-best player overall. He did not play basketball as a junior, having left the team to focus on football, but continued competing in track, and helped Owensboro win the regional team title while also being the individual region champion in the triple jump.

Prior to the start of his senior season, Wimsatt announced his commitment to play college football for the Rutgers Scarlet Knights of the Big Ten Conference, being the highest-ranked quarterback prospect in the team's history. He appeared in three games in 2021, going 46-for-80 passing for 581 yards with six touchdowns before abruptly leaving to enroll early at Rutgers. He finished his time at Owensboro High School having thrown for 5,304 yards and 62 touchdowns.

== College career ==
=== Rutgers ===
Wimsatt became eligible immediately at Rutgers and made his debut in their eighth game of the 2021 season, playing one snap against Illinois, on which he threw a 13-yard completion for a first down on fourth down. He played his second game two weeks later against Indiana, recording three rushes for 20 yards. He briefly appeared in Rutgers' loss to Penn State on November 20 and saw his most extensive action against Wake Forest in the Gator Bowl. Against Wake Forest, Wimsatt completed 7-of-16 passes for 30 yards with an interception while running four times for 38 yards. He finished the season with nine completions on 21 pass attempts for 45 yards and 68 rushing yards off nine attempts.

Wimsatt began the 2022 season as a backup, totaling five pass completions on nine attempts with an interception in the first game of the year. He made his first start the following week in the Scarlet Knights' 66–7 win over Wagner, going 4-for-11 for 63 yards passing while running six times for 62 yards. He also threw his first career touchdown pass in the game. It would be one of six starts in eight appearances on the year for Wimsatt. He posted his first start against a Big Ten opponent on his 19th birthday, October 29, completing 6-of-17 passes with an interception in a loss to Minnesota. Wimsatt had his best game of the year in a one-score loss to Michigan State on November 12, posting career-highs with 20 pass completions on 34 attempts for 236 yards with two touchdowns. The following week, he threw for 122 yards and one touchdown in a loss to nationally ranked Penn State, before closing out the year against Maryland. He finished his sophomore season having completed 65-of-145 passes for 757 yards with five passing touchdowns.

Entering fall camp as a junior, Wimsatt was named Rutgers' starting quarterback for the 2023 season.

=== Kentucky ===
After the 2023 season, Wimsatt transferred to Kentucky.

On December 9, 2024, Wimsatt announced that he would enter the transfer portal for the second time.

=== Jacksonville State ===
On January 5, 2025, Wimsatt decided to transfer to Jacksonville State.

=== Statistics ===
Season	Team	Games			Passing								Rushing			
Season	Team	GP	GS	Record	Cmp	Att	Pct	Yds	Y/A	TD	Int	Rtg	Att	Yds	Avg	TD
2021	Rutgers	4	0	—	9	21	42.9	45	2.1	0	2	41.8	9	68	7.6	0
2022	Rutgers	8	6	1–5	65	145	44.8	757	5.2	5	7	90.4	40	63	1.6	0
2023	Rutgers	13	13	7–6	138	289	47.8	1,735	6.0	9	8	102.9	131	497	3.8	11
2024	Kentucky	8	0	—	16	39	41.0	287	7.4	3	4	107.7	49	183	3.7	2
2025	Jacksonville State	13	5	2–3	63	112	56.3	731	6.5	4	2	119.3	52	264	5.1	4
Career		46	24	10−14	291	606	48.0	3,555	5.9	21	23	101.1	271	1,075	3.8	17

== Professional career ==
In April 2026, Wimsatt was invited to rookie camp by the Washington Commanders.
