= 2011 Pinstripe Bowl =

2011 New Era Pinstripe Bowl
Rutgers Scarlet Knights	Iowa State Cyclones
(8–4)	(6–6)
Big East	Big 12
27	13
Head coach: Greg Schiano	Head coach: Paul Rhoads
	1	2	3	4	Total
Rutgers	0	17	0	10	27
Iowa State	6	0	0	7	13
- Date: December 30, 2011
- Season: 2011
- Stadium: Yankee Stadium
- Location: Bronx, New York
- Favorite: Rutgers by 2
- Referee: Randy Smith (Conference USA)
- Attendance: 38,328
- Payout: US$2 million per team

United States TV coverage
- Network: ESPN
- Announcers: Chris Fowler (Play-by-Play); Jesse Palmer (Analyst); Tom Rinaldi (Sidelines)
- Nielsen ratings: 2.14

The 2011 New Era Pinstripe Bowl, the second edition of the game, was a post-season American college football bowl game, held on December 30, 2011 at Yankee Stadium in the Bronx, New York as part of the 2011–12 NCAA Bowl season.

The game, was telecast at 3:20 p.m. ET on ESPN. The Rutgers Scarlet Knights from the Big East Conference defeated the Iowa State Cyclones from the Big 12 Conference by a score of 27–13.

== Game summary ==
=== Scoring ===
Scoring Play	Score
1st Quarter
ISU – Zach Guyer 40-yard field goal, 13:41	ISU 3–0
ISU – Zach Guyer 45-yard field goal, 7:35	ISU 6–0
2nd Quarter
RUT – Jawan Jamison 1-yard run (Te kick), 12:39	RUT 7–6
RUT – San San Te 21-yard field goal, 10:30	RUT 10–6
RUT – Jawan Jamison 12-yard run (Te kick), 2:24	RUT 17–6
3rd Quarter
no scoring	RUT 17–6
4th Quarter
RUT – San San Te 29-yard field goal, 13:21	RUT 20–6
ISU – Jeff Woody 20-yard run (Guyer kick), 10:00	RUT 20–13
RUT – Brandon Coleman 86-yard pass from Chas Dodd (Te kick), 5:36	RUT 27–13

=== Statistics ===
Statistics	Rutgers	Iowa State
First downs	17	19
Total offense, plays-yards	369	311
Rushes-yards (net)	42–173	29–91
Passing yards	196	220
Passes, Comp-Att-Int	13–24–0	17–39–2
Fumbles-Interceptions	0–0	1–2
Time of Possession	21:15	15:25
