= Tyler Van Dyke =

American football player (born 2001)

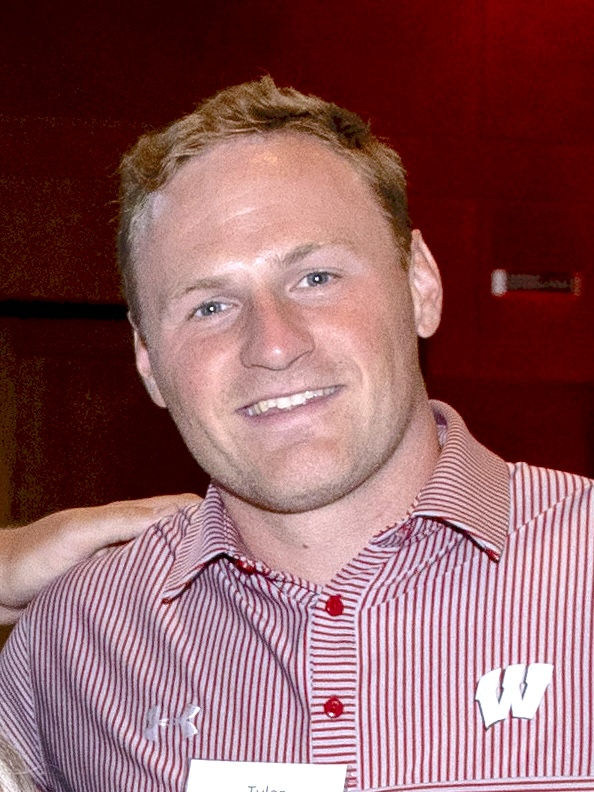
- Van Dyke in 2024

Current position
- Title: Offensive analyst
- Team: SMU Mustangs

Biographical details
- Born: March 1, 2001 (age 25); Glastonbury, Connecticut, U.S.
- Height: 6 ft 4 in (193 cm)
- Weight: 224 lb (102 kg; 16 st 0 lb)

Playing career
- 2020–2023: Miami
- 2024: Wisconsin
- 2025: SMU
- Position: Quarterback

Coaching career (HC unless noted)
- 2026–present: SMU (OA)

Accomplishments and honors

Awards
- As a player: ACC Rookie of the Year (2021); ACC Offensive Rookie of the Year (2021)

Tyler Van Dyke (born March 1, 2001) is an American college football coach and former quarterback who is currently an offensive assistant for the SMU Mustangs. He played college football for the Miami Hurricanes, Wisconsin Badgers, and SMU Mustangs.

== Early life ==
Van Dyke attended Suffield Academy in Suffield, Connecticut. Over his final two high school seasons he had 4,600 passing yards and 39 passing touchdowns. He committed to the University of Miami to play college football.

== College career ==
=== Miami (FL) ===
As a true freshman at Miami in 2020, Van Dyke appeared in two games as a backup to D'Eriq King. He entered 2021 as a backup to King before becoming the starter after King suffered an injury. In his first start against Central Connecticut State he completed 10 of 11 passes for 270 yards and three touchdowns.

On November 27, 2023, Van Dyke announced he would be entering the transfer portal as a graduate transfer.

=== Wisconsin ===
On December 12, 2023, Van Dyke announced that he would be transferring to the University of Wisconsin–Madison. On September 14, 2024, Van Dyke tore his ACL in his right knee on the Badgers' first drive against Alabama in a 42–10 loss. On December 9, Van Dyke announced that he would enter the transfer portal for the second time.

=== SMU ===
On January 8, 2025, it was announced that Van Dyke would be transferring to Southern Methodist University.

=== Statistics ===
Year	Team	Games			Passing								Rushing			
Year	Team	GP	GS	Record	Comp	Att	Pct	Yards	Avg	TD	Int	Rate	Att	Yards	Avg	TD
2020	Miami	2	0	0–0	0	2	0.0	0	0.0	0	0	0.0	1	−7	−7.0	0
2021	Miami	10	9	6–3	202	324	62.3	2,931	9.0	25	6	160.1	53	57	1.1	1
2022	Miami	9	9	3–6	160	253	63.2	1,835	7.2	10	5	133.3	30	−34	−1.1	0
2023	Miami	11	11	6–5	219	333	65.8	2,703	8.1	19	12	145.6	24	16	0.7	1
2024	Wisconsin	3	3	2–1	43	68	63.2	422	6.2	1	0	120.2	15	26	1.7	1
2025	SMU	0	0	–	0	0	0.0	0	0.0	0	0	0.0	0	0	0.0	0
Career		33	32	17–15	624	978	63.8	7,891	8.1	55	23	145.2	123	58	0.5	3

== Coaching career ==
In February 2026, he was hired as an offensive assistant at SMU.
