= 2025 Miami Hurricanes football team =

American college football season

2025 Miami Hurricanes football

Florida Cup champion Cotton Bowl Classic champion Fiesta Bowl champion

CFP First Round, W 10–3 at Texas A&M; Cotton Bowl (CFP Quarterfinal), W 24–14 vs. Ohio State; Fiesta Bowl (CFP Semifinal), W 31–27 vs. Ole Miss; CFP National Championship, L 21–27 vs. Indiana
- Conference: Atlantic Coast Conference

Ranking
- Coaches: No. 2
- AP: No. 2
- Record: 13–3 (6–2 ACC)
- Head coach: Mario Cristobal (4th season)
- Offensive coordinator: Shannon Dawson (3rd season)
- Offensive scheme: Air raid
- Defensive coordinator: Corey Hetherman (1st season)
- Base defense: 4–2–5
- Captains: Carson Beck; Rueben Bain Jr.; Francis Mauigoa
- Home stadium: Hard Rock Stadium

Uniform
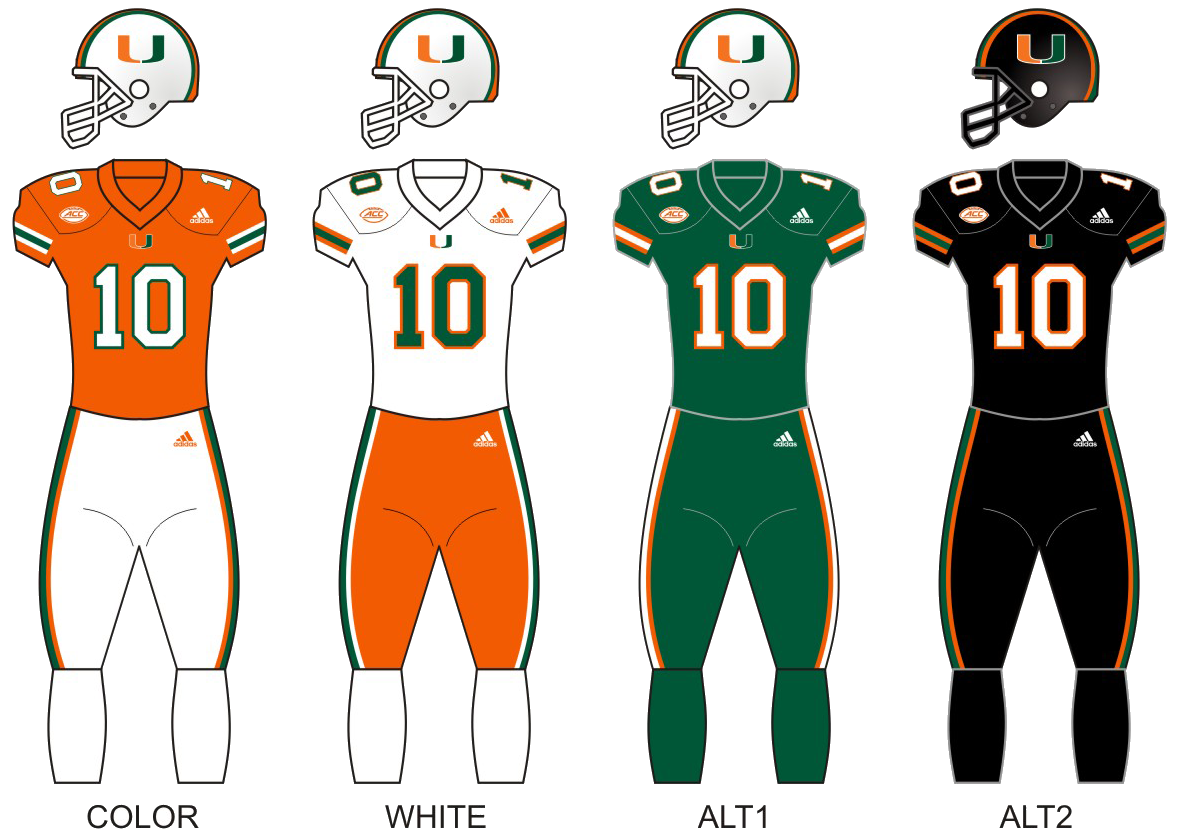

2025 Atlantic Coast Conference football standings
	Conf.			Overall
Team	W		L	W		L
No. 16 Virginia y	7	–	1	11	–	3
Duke y$	6	–	2	9	–	5
No. 2 Miami (FL) ^	6	–	2	13	–	3
Georgia Tech	6	–	2	9	–	4
SMU	6	–	2	9	–	4
Pittsburgh	6	–	2	8	–	5
Louisville	4	–	4	9	–	4
Wake Forest	4	–	4	9	–	4
NC State	4	–	4	8	–	5
California	4	–	4	7	–	6
Clemson	4	–	4	7	–	6
Stanford	3	–	5	4	–	8
Florida State	2	–	6	5	–	7
Virginia Tech	2	–	6	3	–	9
North Carolina	2	–	6	4	–	8
Boston College	1	–	7	2	–	10
Syracuse	1	–	7	3	–	9
Championship: Duke 27, Virginia 20^{OT}
^ – College Football Playoff participant; $ – Conference champion; y – Championship game participant; As of November 15, 2026; Rankings from AP Poll

The 2025 Miami Hurricanes football team represented the University of Miami in the Atlantic Coast Conference (ACC) during the 2025 NCAA Division I FBS football season. The Hurricanes were led by Mario Cristobal in his fourth year as head coach. Their home games were played at Hard Rock Stadium located in Miami Gardens, Florida.

This season marked the 100th anniversary of Miami Hurricanes football. Led by former Georgia quarterback Carson Beck, the team started 5–0 for the second consecutive year and ranked No. 2 in the polls before being upset by Louisville. After a 26–20 overtime loss to SMU, which fell the Hurricanes down to No. 18 in the polls, they closed the regular season with four consecutive wins. The team finished with a 10–2 regular season record, and 6–2 in ACC play, finishing second in a five-way tie for No. 2 in the ACC, only behind the eventual ACC champion Duke. They were selected for the 2025–26 College Football Playoff with the tenth overall seed in the final rankings.

Miami started their playoff run by defeating No. 7 Texas A&M 10–3, aided with a game-ending interception from Bryce Fitzgerald. Then, they upset the defending national champions, the Ohio State Buckeyes at the Cotton Bowl, as a 9.5-point underdog, winning 24–14. This was Miami’s first victory in a major bowl game since the 2004 Orange Bowl. They then advanced to the Fiesta Bowl against Ole Miss, where they won 31–27, thanks to Carson Beck's 3-yard touchdown scramble in the waning moments of the game. Miami advanced to the College Football Playoff National Championship against Indiana, where they lost in their first championship appearance since the 2002 season. Miami was the first team to play for the national championship in their home stadium since they themselves did it during the 1995 Orange Bowl, and the first since the creation of the national championship game as a game separated from the bowl system.

== Schedule ==
Date	Time	Opponent	Rank	Site	TV	Result	Attendance
August 31	7:30 p.m.	No. 6 Notre Dame*	No. 10	Hard Rock Stadium; Miami Gardens, FL (rivalry)	ABC	W 27–24	66,793
September 6	7:00 p.m.	Bethune–Cookman*	No. 5	Hard Rock Stadium; Miami Gardens, FL	ACCNX/ESPN+	W 45–3	60,617
September 13	4:30 p.m.	No. 18 South Florida*	No. 5	Hard Rock Stadium; Miami Gardens, FL	The CW	W 49–12	66,591
September 20	7:30 p.m.	Florida*	No. 4	Hard Rock Stadium; Miami Gardens, FL (rivalry, College GameDay)	ABC	W 26–7	66,713
October 4	7:30 p.m.	at No. 18 Florida State	No. 3	Doak Campbell Stadium; Tallahassee, FL (rivalry)	ABC/ACCN	W 28–22	67,277
October 17	7:00 p.m.	Louisville	No. 2	Hard Rock Stadium; Miami Gardens, FL (rivalry)	ESPN	L 21–24	66,573
October 25	7:00 p.m.	Stanford	No. 9	Hard Rock Stadium; Miami Gardens, FL	ESPN	W 42–7	63,892
November 1	12:00 p.m.	at SMU	No. 10т	Gerald J. Ford Stadium; Dallas, TX	ESPN	L 20–26 ^{OT}	35,074
November 8	3:30 p.m.	Syracuse	No. 18	Hard Rock Stadium; Miami Gardens, FL	ESPN	W 38–10	60,337
November 15	3:30 p.m.	NC State	No. 15	Hard Rock Stadium; Miami Gardens, FL	ESPN	W 41–7	59,157
November 22	12:00 p.m.	at Virginia Tech	No. 13	Lane Stadium; Blacksburg, VA (rivalry)	ESPN	W 34–17	65,632
November 29	12:00 p.m.	at No. 22 Pittsburgh	No. 12	Acrisure Stadium; Pittsburgh, PA	ABC	W 38–7	49,845
December 20	12:00 p.m.	at (7) No. 7 Texas A&M*	(10) No. 10	Kyle Field; College Station, TX (CFP First Round, College GameDay)	ABC/ESPN	W 10–3	104,122
December 31	7:30 p.m.	vs. (2) No. 2 Ohio State*	(10) No. 10	AT&T Stadium; Arlington, TX (Cotton Bowl Classic–CFP Quarterfinal)	ESPN	W 24–14	71,323
January 8, 2026	7:30 p.m.	vs. (6) No. 6 Ole Miss*	(10) No. 10	State Farm Stadium; Glendale, AZ (Fiesta Bowl–CFP Semifinal, College GameDay)	ESPN	W 31–27	67,928
January 19, 2026	7:30 p.m.	(1) No. 1 Indiana*	(10) No. 10	Hard Rock Stadium; Miami Gardens, FL (CFP National Championship, College GameDay)	ESPN	L 21–27	67,227
*Non-conference game; Rankings from AP Poll (and CFP Rankings, after November 4) - Released prior to game; All times are in Eastern time; Source:

== Rankings ==
Ranking movements Legend: ██ Increase in ranking ██ Decrease in ranking т = Tied with team above or below ( ) = First-place votes
	Week																
Poll	Pre	1	2	3	4	5	6	7	8	9	10	11	12	13	14	15	Final
AP	10	5	5	4 (3)	2 (7)	3 (4)	2 (21)	2 (13)	9	10т	18	16	14	13	12	10	2
Coaches	10	7	6	6	6 (1)	3 (1)	3 (3)	2 (2)	9	9	18	16	15	13	13	10	2
CFP	Not released										18	15	13	12	12	10	Not released

== Personnel ==
=== Coaching staff ===
Name	Title
Mario Cristobal	Head coach
Shannon Dawson	Offensive coordinator/quarterbacks coach
Corey Hetherman	Defensive coordinator/linebackers coach
Alex Mirabal	Assistant head coach/offensive line coach
Danny Kalter	Special Teams Coordinator
Damione Lewis	Defensive line coach
Kevin Beard	Wide receivers coach
Zac Etheridge	Cornerbacks coach
Matt Merritt	Running backs coach
Will Harris	Safeties coach
Jason Taylor	Defensive ends coach
Cody Woodiel	Tight ends coach
William Vlachos	Asst. Offensive Line
Todd Stroud	Senior football advisor

=== Roster ===
2025 Miami Hurricanes football team roster
Players
Coaches
Offense

Pos.	#	Name	Class
WR	0	Keelan Marion	Sr
WR	1	Joshisa Trader	So
RB	2	Jordan Lyle	So
WR	3	Joshua Moore	Fr
RB	4	Mark Fletcher Jr.	Jr
WR	5	Ray Ray Joseph	Jr
RB	6	CharMar Brown	So
WR	7	CJ Daniels	Sr
QB	8	Emory Williams	So
TE	9	Elija Lofton	So
WR	10	Malachi Toney	Fr
QB	11	Carson Beck	Sr
WR	12	Ny Carr	So
WR	13	Daylyn Upshaw	Fr
QB	15	Judd Anderson	Fr
QB	16	Luke Nickel	Fr
WR	17	Tony Johnson	Sr
QB	18	Joe Borchers	So
WR	18	Chance Robinson	So
TE	19	Brock Schott	Fr
RB	20	Terrell Walden II	Jr
RB	22	Girard Pringle Jr.	Fr
RB	25	Chris Wheatley-Humphrey	Fr
WR	33	Nick Thomas	Fr
RB	35	Jack Whitehouse	Fr
WR	37	Henry Pikus	Jr
WR	40	Brennan Burton	Fr
WR	43	Andrew Cohen	Sr
TE	44	Owen Ruskavich	So
TE	46	Dylan Reiman	Fr
OL	52	James Brockermeyer	Sr
OL	55	Nino Francavilla	So
OL	61	Francis Mauigoa	Jr
OL	62	Tommy Kinsler IV	So
OL	63	Samson Okunlola	So
OL	64	Ralph Scroggins	Fr
OL	65	Seuseu Alofaituli	Fr
OL	66	Max Buchanan	Fr
OL	70	Markel Bell	Sr
OL	71	Jaden Wilkerson	Fr
OL	72	Demetrius Campbell	Fr
OL	73	Anez Cooper	Sr
OL	74	Yerovi Valdes Alfonso	Fr
OL	76	Ryan Rodriguez	Sr
OL	77	Juan Minaya	Fr
OL	78	Matthew McCoy	Jr
OL	79	Deryc Plazz	Fr
TE	80	Hunter Carver	Fr
QB	81	Riply Luna	So
TE	84	Jack Nickel	Jr
TE	85	Jackson Carver	So
WR	86	Kolby Luna	So
TE	87	Alex Bauman	Sr
TE	88	Luka Gilbert	Fr

Defense

Pos.	#	Name	Class
DB	0	Keionte Scott	Sr
LB	1	Mohamed Toure	GS
DB	2	Damari Brown	So
DL	3	Akheem Mesidor	Sr
DL	4	Rueben Bain Jr.	Jr
DL	5	Justin Scott	So
DB	6	Xavier Lucas	So
DB	7	Zechariah Poyser	So
DB	8	Jakobe Thomas	Sr
LB	9	Malik Bryant	Jr
LB	10	Raul Aguirre Jr.	Jr
DL	11	David Blay Jr.	Sr
DL	12	Marquise Lightfoot	So
DB	13	Bryce Fitzgerald	Fr
DL	14	Hayden Lowe	Fr
DB	15	Markeith Williams	Jr
DB	16	Ja'Boree Antoine	Fr
LB	17	Bobby Washington Jr.	So
DL	18	Armondo Blount	So
DB	19	Charles "Chuck" Brantley	Sr
DB	20	Chris Ewald Jr.	Fr
LB	21	Jaylin Alderman	Sr
LB	22	Cam Pruitt	So
DB	23	Dylan Day	So
DB	24	Ethan O'Connor	So
DB	25	Jadais Richard	Sr
DB	26	Amari Wallace	Fr
DB	27	Ryan Mack	Fr
DB	28	Isaiah Taylor	Sr
DB	29	OJ Frederique Jr.	So
LB	30	Kellen Wiley Jr.	Fr
LB	31	Wesley Bissainthe	Sr
LB	32	Kamal Bonner	So
DL	33	Booker Pickett	Fr
LB	34	Adarius Haynes	So
DL	35	Herbert Scroggins III	Fr
DB	36	Nick Kelly	Jr
LB	39	Casey Rizzi	Fr
DB	40	Briton Allen	GS
LB	41	Chase Smith	Sr
DL	42	Artavius Jones	Fr
DB	43	Tyler Rowe	Jr
DL	44	Cole McConathy II	So
LB	45	Braylon Lamar	So
DB	47	Stone Stroud	Fr
DB	48	Andres Williams	Fr
LB	52	Jack McManus	Jr
LB	54	Ezekiel Marcelin Jr.	Fr
DL	55	Mykah Newton	Fr
DL	90	Daylen Russell	Fr
DL	92	Samuel Coufal	So
DL	93	Donta Simpson	Fr
DL	95	Cooper Ricks	So
DL	99	Ahmad Moten Sr.	Jr

Special teams

Pos.	#	Name	Class
K	38	Carter Davis	Sr
K	45	Bert Auburn	Sr
LS	46	Adam Booker	Jr
LS	54	Michael Donovan	Sr
P	94	Dylan Joyce	Jr
P	96	Tucker Tevepaugh	Fr
K	97	Will Rocha	So

Head coach

- Mario Cristobal

Coordinators/assistant coaches

- Shannon Dawson – Offensive Coordinator/Quarterbacks
- Corey Hetherman – Defensive Coordinator/Linebackers
- Alex Mirabal – Assistant Head Coach/Offensive Line
- Damione Lewis – Defensive Line
- Kevin Beard – Wide Receivers
- Zac Etheridge – Cornerbacks
- Matt Merritt – Running Backs
- Jason Taylor – Defensive Line
- Cody Woodiel – Tight Ends

Legend

- (C) Team captain
- (S) Suspended
- (I) Ineligible
- Injured
- Redshirt

Roster
Last update: August 26, 2025

=== Depth chart ===
Defense

NB
0 Keionte Scott
28 Isaiah Taylor
⋅

FS
7 Zechariah Poyser
13 Bryce Fitzgerald
⋅

WLB	MLB
1 Mohamed Toure	31 Wesley Bissainthe
41 Chase Smith	10 Raul Aguirre Jr.
⋅	⋅

SS
8 Jakobe Thomas
23 Dylan Day
⋅

CB
6 Xavier Lucas
29 OJ Frederique Jr.
⋅

DE	DT	DT	DE
3 Akheem Mesidor	99 Ahmad Moten Sr.	11 David Blay Jr.	4 Rueben Bain Jr.
35 Herbert Scroggins	18 Armondo Blount	5 Justin Scott	12 Marquise Lightfoot
⋅	⋅	⋅	⋅

CB
24 Ethan O'Connor
2 Demari Brown
16 Ja'Boree Antoine
19 Charles Brantley

Offense

WR
0 Keelan Marion
3 Joshua Moore
⋅

WR
10 Malachi Toney
17 Tony Johnson
⋅

LT	LG	C	RG	RT
70 Markel Bell	78 Matthew McCoy	52 James Brockermeyer	73 Anez Cooper	61 Francis Mauigoa
79 Deryc Plazz	63 Samson Okunlola	76 Ryan Rodriguez	66 Max Buchanan	62 Tommy Kinsler IV
⋅	⋅	⋅	⋅	⋅

TE
87 Alex Bauman
9 Elija Lofton
88 Luka Gilbert

WR
7 CJ Daniels
1 Joshisa Trader
⋅

QB
11 Carson Beck
8 Emory Williams
16 Luke Nickel

Key reserves

Special teams
PK 38 Carter Davis
PK 45 Bert Auburn
P 94 Dylan Joyce
KR 0 Keelan Marion
PR 10 Malachi Toney
LS 46 Adam Booker
H 94 Dylan Joyce

RB
4 Mark Fletcher Jr.
6 CharMar Brown
22 Girard Pringle Jr.

== Game summaries ==
=== vs No. 6 Notre Dame ===
No. 6 Notre Dame Fighting Irish (0–0) at No. 10 Miami Hurricanes (0–0) – Game summary

Quarter	1	2	3	4	Total
No. 6 Fighting Irish	0	7	0	17	24
No. 10 Hurricanes	0	14	7	6	27

at Hard Rock Stadium • Miami Gardens, Florida

- Date: August 31
- Game time: 7:30 p.m.
- Game weather: Rain
- Game attendance: 66,793
- Referee: Adam Savoie
- TV announcers (ABC): Sean McDonough (play-by-play), Greg McElroy (analyst), Molly McGrath, and Taylor McGregor (sideline reporters)

Game information

First quarter

- No scoring plays.

Second quarter

- (14:04) MIA – Malachi Toney 28-yard pass from Carson Beck, Carter Davis kick (Drive: 8 plays, 70 yards, 2:42; Miami 7–0)
- (5:21) ND – Micah Gilbert 7-yard pass from CJ Carr, Noah Burnette kick (Drive: 11 plays, 68 yards, 5:49; Tied 7–7)
- (0:12) MIA – CJ Daniels 20-yard pass from Carson Beck, Carter Davis kick (Drive: 10 plays, 75 yards, 5:09; Miami 14–7)

Third quarter

- (7:23) MIA – CharMar Brown 5-yard run, Carter Davis kick (Drive: 12 plays, 75 yards, 7:37; Miami 21–7)

Fourth quarter

- (14:55) ND – Jordan Faison 2-yard pass from CJ Carr, Noah Burnette kick (Drive: 11 plays, 64 yards, 5:16; Miami 21–14)
- (9:42) MIA – Carter Davis 38-yard field goal (Drive: 4 plays, 8 yards, 2:13; Miami 24–14)
- (5:32) ND – Noah Burnette 39-yard field goal (Drive: 10 plays, 54 yards, 4:10; Miami 24–17)
- (3:21) ND – CJ Carr 7-yard run, Noah Burnette kick (Drive: 3 plays, 75 yards, 1:14; Tied 24–24)
- (1:04) MIA – Carter Davis 47-yard field goal (Drive: 9 plays, 46 yards, 2:17; Miami 27–24)

Statistics	ND	MIA
First downs	18	20
Plays–yards	54–315	68–332
Rushes–yards	24–97	37–127
Passing yards	221	205
Passing: comp–att–int	19–30–1	20–31–0
Turnovers	2	0
Time of possession	26:03	33:57

Team	Category	Player	Statistics
Notre Dame	Passing	CJ Carr	19/30, 221 yards, 2 TD, INT
Notre Dame	Rushing	Jadarian Price	6 carries, 45 yards
Notre Dame	Receiving	Eli Raridon	5 receptions, 97 yards
Miami (FL)	Passing	Carson Beck	20/31, 205 yards, 2 TD
Miami (FL)	Rushing	Mark Fletcher Jr.	15 carries, 66 yards
Miami (FL)	Receiving	Malachi Toney	6 receptions, 82 yards, TD

=== vs Bethune–Cookman (FCS) ===
Bethune–Cookman Wildcats (FCS) (0–1) at No. 5 Miami Hurricanes (1–0) – Game summary

Quarter	1	2	3	4	Total
Wildcats (FCS)	0	3	0	0	3
No. 5 Hurricanes	14	14	7	10	45

at Hard Rock Stadium • Miami Gardens, Florida

- Date: September 6
- Game time: 7:00 p.m.
- Game weather: Cloudy • Temperature: 83 °F (28 °C) • Wind: SW at 2 miles per hour (3.2 km/h)
- Game attendance: 60,617
- Referee: Rory Bernard
- TV announcers (ACCNX/ESPN+): Mike Corey (play-by-play), Tyoka Jackson (analyst), and Madison Hock (sideline reporter)

Game information

First quarter

- (9:16) MIA – C.J. Daniels 40-yard pass from Carson Beck, Carter Davis kick (Drive: 8 plays, 70 yards, 2:42; Miami 7–0)
- (2:34) MIA – Mark Fletcher Jr. 16-yard run, Carter Davis kick (Drive: 9 plays, 74 yards, 4:33; Miami 14–0)

Second quarter

- (9:55) MIA – CharMar Brown 2-yard run, Carter Davis kick (Drive: 8 plays, 68 yards, 4:08; Miami 21–0)
- (3:08) MIA – Juan Dominguez 32-yard field goal (Drive: 11 plays, 60 yards, 6:47; Miami 21–3)
- (2:34) MIA – C.J. Daniels 5-yard pass from Carson Beck, Bert Auburn kick (Drive: 11 plays, 71 yards, 2:24; Miami 28–3)

Third quarter

- (10:39) MIA – Mark Fletcher Jr. 1-yard run, Bert Auburn kick (Drive: 9 plays, 75 yards, 4:21; Miami 35–3)

Fourth quarter

- (13:52) MIA – Girard Pringle Jr. 30-yard run, Will Rocha kick (Drive: 5 plays, 69 yards, 1:57; Miami 42–3)
- (1:56) MIA – Bert Auburn 31-yard field goal (Drive: 13 plays, 67 yards, 6:11; Miami 45–3)

Statistics	BCU	MIA
First downs	14	31
Plays–yards	50–191	66–543
Rushes–yards	33–92	30–199
Passing yards	99	344
Passing: comp–att–int	14–18–1	30–36–0
Turnovers	2	0
Time of possession	31:55	28:05

Team	Category	Player	Statistics
Bethune–Cookman	Passing	Timmy McClain	13/16, 86 yards
Bethune–Cookman	Rushing	Camron Ransom	5 carries, 39 yards
Bethune–Cookman	Receiving	Javon Ross	4 receptions, 22 yards
Miami (FL)	Passing	Carson Beck	22/24, 267 yards, 2 TD
Miami (FL)	Rushing	Mark Fletcher Jr.	11 carries, 86 yards, 2 TD
Miami (FL)	Receiving	Malachi Toney	6 receptions, 80 yards

=== vs No. 18 South Florida ===
No. 18 South Florida Bulls (2–0) at No. 5 Miami Hurricanes (2–0) – Game summary

Quarter	1	2	3	4	Total
No. 18 Bulls	3	3	0	6	12
No. 5 Hurricanes	14	14	7	14	49

at Hard Rock Stadium • Miami Gardens, Florida

- Date: September 13
- Game time: 4:30 p.m.
- Game weather: Cloudy • Temperature: 82 °F (28 °C) • Wind: NE at 3 miles per hour (4.8 km/h)
- Game attendance: 66,591
- Referee: Tim Hedgepeth
- TV announcers (The CW): Thom Brennaman (play-by-play), Will Blackmon (analyst), and Wes Bryant (sideline reporter)

Game information

First quarter

- (9:34) MIA – Joshua Moore 8-yard pass from Carson Beck, Carter Davis kick (Drive: 9 plays, 75 yards, 5:26; Miami 7–0)
- (2:58) MIA – Joshua Moore 39-yard pass from Carson Beck, Carter Davis kick (Drive: 9 plays, 85 yards, 4:31; Miami 14–0)
- (0:26) USF – Nico Gramatica 45-yard field goal (Drive: 7 plays, 48 yards, 2:32; Miami 14–3)

Second quarter

- (11:16) USF – Nico Gramatica 28-yard field goal (Drive: 8 plays, 65 yards, 2:29; Miami 14–6)
- (10:08) MIA – Mark Fletcher Jr. 38-yard run, Carter Davis kick (Drive: 3 plays, 75 yards, 1:11; Miami 21–6)
- (2:33) MIA – Carson Beck Jr. 2-yard run, Carter Davis kick (Drive: 6 plays, 25 yards, 3:03; Miami 28–6)

Third quarter

- (0:35) MIA – Mark Fletcher Jr. 13-yard run, Carter Davis kick (Drive: 6 plays, 91 yards, 3:33; Miami 35–6)

Fourth quarter

- (12:48) USF – Christian Neptune 12-yard pass from Byrum Brown, two–point conversion failed (Drive: 3 plays, 75 yards, 1:11; Miami 35–12)
- (7:04) MIA – CharMar Brown 1-yard pass from Carson Beck, Carter Davis kick (Drive: 9 plays, 75 yards, 5:44; Miami 42–12)
- (1:48) MIA – Girad Pringle Jr. 5-yard run, Bret Auburn kick (Drive: 7 plays, 57 yards, 2:20; Miami 49–12)

Statistics	USF	MIA
First downs	15	17
Plays–yards	68–332	68–576
Rushes–yards	27–40	38–205
Passing yards	292	371
Passing: comp–att–int	24–41–1	25–30–2
Turnovers	2	2
Time of possession	23:59	36:01

Team	Category	Player	Statistics
South Florida	Passing	Byrum Brown	20/36, 274 yards, TD, INT
South Florida	Rushing	Alvon Isaac	6 carries, 20 yards
South Florida	Receiving	Chas Nimrod	4 receptions, 128 yards
Miami (FL)	Passing	Carson Beck	23/28, 340 yards, 3 TD, 2 INT
Miami (FL)	Rushing	Mark Fletcher Jr.	16 carries, 121 yards, 3 TD
Miami (FL)	Receiving	Keelan Marion	6 receptions, 81 yards

=== vs Florida (rivalry) ===
Florida Gators (1–2) at No. 4 Miami Hurricanes (3–0) – Game summary

Quarter	1	2	3	4	Total
Gators	0	0	7	0	7
No. 4 Hurricanes	7	6	0	13	26

at Hard Rock Stadium • Miami Gardens, Florida

- Date: September 20
- Game time: 7:30 p.m.
- Game weather: Rain • Temperature: 83 °F (28 °C) • Wind: NE 6 mph
- Game attendance: 66,713
- Referee: David Smith
- TV announcers (ABC): Chris Fowler (play-by-play), Kirk Herbstreit (analyst), and Holly Rowe (sideline reporter)

Game information

First quarter

- (9:25) MIA – CharMar Brown 2-yard run, Carter Davis kick (Drive: 7 plays, 56 yards, 3:31; Miami 7–0)

Second quarter

- (14:04) MIA – Carter Davis 53-yard field goal (Drive: 16 plays, 37 yards, 8:19; Miami 10–0)
- (1:29) MIA – Carter Davis 28-yard field goal (Drive: 10 plays, 52 yards, 3:22; Miami 13–0)

Third quarter

- (3:24) FLA – Jadan Baugh 7-yard run, Trey Smack kick (Drive: 11 plays, 80 yards, 6:12; Miami 13–7)

Fourth quarter

- (4:08) MIA – CharMar Brown 1-yard run, two-point conversion failed (Drive: 13 plays, 80 yards, 7:12; Miami 19–7)
- (1:56) MIA – Mark Fletcher Jr. 1-yard run, Carter Davis kick (Drive: 4 plays, 22 yards, 1:02; Miami 26–7)

Statistics	FLA	MIA
First downs	7	21
Plays–yards	52–141	76–344
Rushes–yards	29–80	46–184
Passing yards	61	160
Passing: comp–att–int	12–23–0	17–30–1
Turnovers	0	1
Time of possession	23:30	36:30

Team	Category	Player	Statistics
Florida	Passing	DJ Lagway	12/23, 61 yards
Florida	Rushing	Jadan Baugh	12 carries, 46 yards, TD
Florida	Receiving	Vernell Brown III	2 receptions, 22 yards
Miami (FL)	Passing	Carson Beck	17/30, 160 yards, INT
Miami (FL)	Rushing	Mark Fletcher Jr.	24 carries, 124 yards, TD
Miami (FL)	Receiving	CharMar Brown	4 receptions, 53 yards

=== at No. 18 Florida State (rivalry) ===
No. 3 Miami Hurricanes (4–0) at No. 18 Florida State Seminoles (3–1) – Game summary

Quarter	1	2	3	4	Total
No. 3 Hurricanes	7	7	14	0	28
No. 18 Seminoles	3	0	0	19	22

at Doak Campbell Stadium • Tallahassee, Florida

- Date: October 4
- Game time: 7:30 p.m.
- Game weather: Cloudy • Temperature: 83 °F (28 °C) • Wind: NE 10 mph
- Game attendance: 67,277
- Referee: Jerry Magallanes
- TV announcers (ABC): Chris Fowler (play-by-play), Kirk Herbstreit (analyst), and Holly Rowe (sideline reporter)

Game information

First quarter

- (10:02) FSU – Jake Weinberg 23-yard field goal (Drive: 11 plays, 70 yards, 4:58; Florida State 3–0)
- (0:50) MIA – CJ Daniels 4-yard pass from Carson Beck, Carter Davis kick (Drive: 9 plays, 79 yards, 4:51; Miami 7–3)

Second quarter

- (11:25) MIA – Malachi Toney 44-yard pass from Carson Beck, Carter Davis kick (Drive: 1 play, 44 yards, 0:08; Miami 14–3)

Third quarter

- (9:09) MIA – Malachi Toney 40-yard pass from Carson Beck, Carter Davis kick (Drive: 10 plays, 75 yards, 5:51; Miami 21–3)
- (3:53) MIA – CJ Daniels 24-yard pass from Carson Beck, Carter Davis kick (Drive: 8 plays, 80 yards, 4:03; Miami 28–3)

Fourth quarter

- (10:04) FSU – Lawayne McCoy 8-yard pass from Tommy Castellanos, Micah Danzy two-point run (Drive: 10 plays, 47 yards, 2:56; Miami 28–11)
- (3:22) FSU – Randy Pittman Jr. 6-yard pass from Tommy Castellanos, Lawayne McCoy-Tommy Castellanos two-point pass (Drive: 19 plays, 96 yards, 5:10; Miami 28–19)
- (0:20) FSU – Jake Weinberg 35-yard field goal (Drive: 7 plays, 60 yards, 0:52; Miami 28–22)

Statistics	MIA	FSU
First downs	14	28
Plays–yards	59–338	83–404
Rushes–yards	32–98	38–132
Passing yards	240	272
Passing: comp–att–int	20–27–0	25–45–2
Turnovers	0	3
Time of possession	30:24	29:36

Team	Category	Player	Statistics
Miami (FL)	Passing	Carson Beck	20/27, 240 yards, 4 TD
Miami (FL)	Rushing	Mark Fletcher Jr.	12 carries, 41 yards
Miami (FL)	Receiving	Malachi Toney	7 receptions, 107 yards, 2 TD
Florida State	Passing	Tommy Castellanos	25/45, 272 yards, 2 TD, 2 INT
Florida State	Rushing	Tommy Castellanos	16 carries, 57 yards
Florida State	Receiving	Duce Robinson	6 receptions, 87 yards

=== vs Louisville (rivalry) ===
Louisville Cardinals (4–1) at No. 2 Miami Hurricanes (5–0) – Game summary

Quarter	1	2	3	4	Total
Cardinals	14	0	3	7	24
No. 2 Hurricanes	7	3	3	8	21

at Hard Rock Stadium • Miami Gardens, Florida

- Date: October 17
- Game time: 7:00 p.m.
- Game weather: Cloudy • Temperature: 79 °F (26 °C) • Wind: NE at 7 miles per hour (11 km/h)
- Game attendance: 66,573
- Referee: Adam Savoie
- TV announcers (ESPN): Dave Pasch (play-by-play), Dusty Dvoracek (analyst), and Taylor McGregor (sideline reporter)

Game information

First quarter

- (8:55) LOU – Miller Moss 1-yard run (Cooper Ranvier kick) (Drive: 11 plays, 75 yards, 6:05; Louisville 7–0)
- (5:09) LOU – Chris Bell 35-yard pass from Miller Moss (Cooper Ranvier kick) (Drive: 4 plays, 46 yards, 2:06; Louisville 14–0)
- (2:19) MIA – Mark Fletcher Jr. 2-yard run (Carter Davis kick) (Drive: 5 plays, 75 yards, 2:50; Louisville 14–7)

Second quarter

- (1:56) MIA – Carter Davis 27-yard field goal (Drive: 7 plays, 61 yards, 3:34; Louisville 14–10)

Third quarter

- (10:58) LOU – Cooper Ranvier 48-yard field goal (Drive: 6 plays, 34 yards, 2:22; Louisville 17–10)
- (1:51) MIA – Carter Davis 41-yard field goal (Drive: 6 plays, 32 yards, 2:52; Louisville 17–13)

Fourth quarter

- (13:27) LOU – Chris Bell 36-yard pass from Miller Moss (Cooper Ranvier kick) (Drive: 8 plays, 75 yards, 3:24; Louisville 24–13)
- (7:37) MIA – Malachi Toney 12-yard run (CJ Daniels pass from Malachi Toney) (Drive: 1 play, 12 yards, 0:05; Louisville 24–21)

Statistics	LOU	MIA
First downs	21	15
Plays–yards	68–367	59–334
Rushes–yards	31–119	24–63
Passing yards	248	271
Passing: comp–att–int	23–37–0	25–35–4
Turnovers	1	4
Time of possession	31:16	28:44

Team	Category	Player	Statistics
Louisville	Passing	Miller Moss	23/37, 248 yards, 2 TD
Louisville	Rushing	Isaac Brown	15 carries, 113 yards
Louisville	Receiving	Chris Bell	9 receptions, 136 yards, 2 TD
Miami (FL)	Passing	Carson Beck	25/35, 271 yards, 4 INT
Miami (FL)	Rushing	Mark Fletcher Jr.	8 carries, 18 yards, TD
Miami (FL)	Receiving	Malachi Toney	9 receptions, 135 yards

=== vs Stanford ===
Stanford Cardinal (3–4) at No. 9 Miami Hurricanes (5–1) – Game summary

Quarter	1	2	3	4	Total
Cardinal	7	0	0	0	7
No. 9 Hurricanes	0	7	21	14	42

at Hard Rock Stadium • Miami Gardens, Florida

- Date: October 25
- Game time: 7:00 p.m.
- Game weather: Cloudy
- Game attendance: 63,892
- Referee: Mike Roche
- TV announcers (ESPN): Mark Jones (play-by-play), Roddy Jones (analyst), and Quint Kessenich (sideline reporter)

Game information

First quarter

- (4:35) STAN – Caden High 9-yard pass from Ben Gulbranson, (Emmet Kenney kick) (Drive: 12 plays, 74 yards, 5:23; Stanford 7–0)

Second quarter

- (1:15) MIA – CJ Daniels 5-yard pass from Carson Beck, (Carter Davis kick) (Drive: 15 plays, 71 yards, 7:26; Tied 7–7)

Third quarter

- (9:34) MIA – Mark Fletcher Jr. 1-yard run, (Carter Davis kick) (Drive: 6 plays, 40 yards, 2:22; Miami 14–7)
- (3:48) MIA – Mark Fletcher Jr. 3-yard run, (Carter Davis kick) (Drive: 1 play, 3 yards, 0:05; Miami 21–7)
- (0:32) MIA – Mark Fletcher Jr. 7-yard run, (Carter Davis kick) (Drive: 4 plays, 45 yards, 1:59; Miami 28–7)

Fourth quarter

- (9:34) MIA – Jordan Lyle 17-yard run, (Bert Auburn kick) (Drive: 8 plays, 76 yards, 4:32; Miami 35–7)
- (0:26) MIA – Girard Pringle Jr. 3-yard run, (Bert Auburn kick) (Drive: 12 plays, 55 yards, 5:53; Miami 42–7)

Statistics	STAN	MIA
First downs	8	25
Plays–yards	53–144	74–404
Rushes–yards	27–55	44–199
Passing yards	89	205
Passing: comp–att–int	12–26–2	22–30–0
Turnovers	2	0
Time of possession	23:18	36:42

Team	Category	Player	Statistics
Stanford	Passing	Ben Gulbranson	9/21, 50 yards, TD, 2 INT
Stanford	Rushing	Cole Tabb	19 carries, 64 yards
Stanford	Receiving	Caden High	3 receptions, 36 yards, TD
Miami (FL)	Passing	Carson Beck	21/28, 189 yards, TD
Miami (FL)	Rushing	Mark Fletcher Jr.	23 carries, 106 yards, 3 TD
Miami (FL)	Receiving	Tony Johnson	3 receptions, 69 yards

=== at SMU ===
No. 10т Miami Hurricanes (6–1) at SMU Mustangs (5–3) – Game summary

Quarter	1	2	3	4	OT	Total
No. 10т Hurricanes	7	3	7	3	0	20
Mustangs	0	7	10	3	6	26

at Gerald J. Ford Stadium • Dallas, Texas

- Date: November 1
- Game time: 12:00 p.m.
- Game weather: Cloudy, 59 °F (15 °C)
- Game attendance: 35,074
- Referee: Jerry Magallanes
- TV announcers (ESPN): Mark Jones (play-by-play), Roddy Jones (analyst), and Quint Kessenich (sideline reporter)

Game information

First quarter

- MIA – Joshisa Trader 36-yard pass from Carson Beck (Carter Davis kick), 4:16. Hurricanes 7–0. Drive: 8 plays, 62 yards, 4:27.

Second quarter

- SMU – Yamir Knight 28-yard pass from Kevin Jennings (Sam Keltner kick), 9:22. Tied 7–7. Drive: 1 play, 28 yards, 0:06.
- MIA – Carter Davis 22-yard field goal, 0:07. Hurricanes 10–7. Drive: 4 plays, 5 yards, 0:42.

Third quarter

- SMU – Kevin Jennings 3-yard run (Sam Keltner kick), 12:11. Mustangs 14–10. Drive: 9 plays, 79 yards, 2:43.
- MIA – Alex Bauman 4-yard pass from Carson Beck (Carter Davis kick), 9:06. Hurricanes 17–14. Drive: 7 plays, 75 yards, 2:59.
- SMU – Sam Keltner 43-yard field goal, 0:07. Tied 17–17. Drive: 10 plays, 44 yards, 3:56.

Fourth quarter

- MIA – Carter Davis 45-yard field goal, 9:34. Hurricanes 20–17. Drive: 10 plays, 49 yards, 5:33.
- SMU – Sam Keltner 38-yard field goal, 0:25. Tied 20–20. Drive: 11 plays, 69 yards, 1:44.

Overtime

- SMU – T. J. Harden 1-yard run. Mustangs 26–20. Drive: 6 plays, 25 yards.

Statistics	MIA	SMU
First downs	23	20
Plays–yards	78–433	70–388
Rushes–yards	40–159	25–23
Passing yards	274	365
Passing: comp–att–int	26–38–2	29–45–0
Turnovers	2	1
Time of possession	37:42	22:18

Team	Category	Player	Statistics
Miami (FL)	Passing	Carson Beck	26/38, 274 yards, 2 TD, 2 INT
Miami (FL)	Rushing	Mark Fletcher Jr.	16 carries, 84 yards
Miami (FL)	Receiving	Joshisa Trader	5 receptions, 81 yards, TD
SMU	Passing	Kevin Jennings	29/44, 365 yards, TD
SMU	Rushing	T. J. Harden	8 carries, 27 yards, TD
SMU	Receiving	Jordan Hudson	11 receptions, 136 yards

=== vs Syracuse ===
Syracuse Orange (3–6) at No. 18 Miami Hurricanes (6–2) – Game summary

Quarter	1	2	3	4	Total
Orange	0	0	3	7	10
No. 18 Hurricanes	0	14	17	7	38

at Hard Rock Stadium • Miami Gardens, Florida

- Date: November 8
- Game time: 3:30 p.m.
- Game weather: Sunny • Temperature: 83 °F (28 °C) • Wind: SW at 2 miles per hour (3.2 km/h)
- Game attendance: 60,337
- Referee: Riley Johnson
- TV announcers (ESPN): Bob Wischusen (play-by-play), Louis Riddick (analyst), and Kris Budden (sideline reporter)

Game information

First quarter

- No scoring plays.

Second quarter

- MIA – Carson Beck 14-yard pass from Malachi Toney (Carter Davis kick), 2:16. Hurricanes 7–0. Drive: 5 plays, 90 yards, 3:08.
- MIA – Keionte Scott 38-yard interception return (Carter Davis kick), 1:50. Hurricanes 14–0.

Third quarter

- SYR – Tripp Woody 38-yard field goal, 11:12. Hurricanes 14–3. Drive: 8 plays, 55 yards, 3:48.
- MIA – Keelan Marion 61-yard pass from Carson Beck (Carter Davis kick), 9:57. Hurricanes 21–3. Drive: 3 plays, 78 yards, 1:09.
- MIA – Girard Pringle Jr. 19-yard run (Carter Davis kick), 2:25. Hurricanes 28–3. Drive: 9 plays, 83 yards, 4:52.
- MIA – Carter Davis 36-yard field goal, 0:00. Hurricanes 31–3. Drive: 4 plays, 5 yards, 1:28.

Fourth quarter

- MIA – Francis Mauigoa 3-yard run (Bert Auburn kick), 2:53. Hurricanes 38–3. Drive: 5 plays, 51 yards, 2:56.
- SYR – Elijah Washington-Baker 17-yard pass from Joseph Filardi (Tripp Woody kick), 0:21. Hurricanes 38–10. Drive: 8 plays, 75 yards, 2:32.

Statistics	SYR	MIA
First downs	20	21
Plays–yards	71–285	57–385
Rushes–yards	43–161	32–124
Passing yards	124	261
Passing: comp–att–int	15–28–2	19–25–0
Turnovers	3	0
Time of possession	29:37	30:23

Team	Category	Player	Statistics
Syracuse	Passing	Rickie Collins	12/25, 85 yards, 2 INT
Syracuse	Rushing	Yasin Willis	13 carries, 63 yards
Syracuse	Receiving	Daunte Bacheyie	2 receptions, 22 yards
Miami (FL)	Passing	Carson Beck	18/24, 247 yards, TD
Miami (FL)	Rushing	Girard Pringle Jr.	7 carries, 55 yards, TD
Miami (FL)	Receiving	Keelan Marion	3 receptions, 116 yards, TD

=== vs NC State ===
NC State Wolfpack (5–4) at No. 15 Miami Hurricanes (7–2) – Game summary

Quarter	1	2	3	4	Total
Wolfpack	0	0	0	7	7
No. 15 Hurricanes	10	14	10	7	41

at Hard Rock Stadium • Miami Gardens, Florida

- Date: November 15
- Game time: 3:30 p.m.
- Game weather: Cloudy • Temperature: 78 °F (26 °C) • Wind: E at 7 miles per hour (11 km/h)
- Game attendance: 59,157
- Referee: Justin Elliott
- TV announcers (ESPN): Mark Jones (play-by-play), Roddy Jones (analyst), and Quint Kessenich (sideline reporter)

Game information

First quarter

- MIA – Carter Davis 31-yard field goal, 7:13. Hurricanes 3–0. Drive: 11 plays, 77 yards, 5:37.
- MIA – Jakobe Thomas 60-yard interception return, Carter Davis kick 3:36. Hurricanes 10–0.

Second quarter

- MIA – CharMar Brown 1-yard run, Carter Davis kick 11:16. Hurricanes 17–0. Drive: 3 plays, 47 yards, 1:32.
- MIA – Malachi Toney 14-yard pass from Carson Beck, Carter Davis kick 0:33. Hurricanes 24–0. Drive: 9 plays, 66 yards, 2:43.

Third quarter

- MIA – Elija Lofton 29-yard pass from Carson Beck, Carter Davis kick 9:55. Hurricanes 31–0. Drive: 8 plays, 85 yards, 4:58.
- MIA – Carter Davis 38-yard field goal, 3:51. Hurricanes 34–0. Drive: 10 plays, 67 yards, 5:13.

Fourth quarter

- MIA – Malachi Toney 15-yard pass from Carson Beck, Bert Auburn kick 11:48. Hurricanes 41–0. Drive: 8 plays, 88 yards, 4:27.
- NCSU – CJ Bailey 10-yard run, Kanoah Vinesett kick 2:18. Hurricanes 41–7. Drive: 10 plays, 75 yards, 5:01.

Statistics	NCSU	MIA
First downs	9	28
Plays–yards	50–143	70–581
Rushes–yards	20–23	37–214
Passing yards	120	367
Passing: comp–att–int	17–30–2	24–33–0
Turnovers	2	1
Time of possession	23:17	36:43

Team	Category	Player	Statistics
NC State	Passing	CJ Bailey	17/30, 120 yards, 2 INT
NC State	Rushing	Jayden Scott	7 carries, 14 yards
NC State	Receiving	Jayden Scott	3 receptions, 40 yards
Miami (FL)	Passing	Carson Beck	21/27, 291 yards, 3 TD
Miami (FL)	Rushing	Girard Pringle Jr.	17 carries, 116 yards
Miami (FL)	Receiving	Keelan Marion	7 receptions, 96 yards

=== at Virginia Tech (rivalry) ===
No. 13 Miami Hurricanes (8–2) at Virginia Tech Hokies (3–7) – game summary

Quarter	1	2	3	4	Total
No. 13 Hurricanes	7	13	7	7	34
Hokies	3	0	7	7	17

at Lane Stadium • Blacksburg, Virginia

- Date: November 22
- Game time: 12:00 p.m. EST
- Game weather:
- Game attendance: 65,632
- Referee: Tim Hedgepeth
- TV announcers (ESPN): Bob Wischusen (play-by-play), Louis Riddick (analyst), and Kris Budden (sideline reporter)

Game information

First quarter

- MIA – Elija Lofton 20-yard pass from Carson Beck (Carter Davis kick), 10:16. Hurricanes 7–0. Drive: 8 plays, 75 yards, 4:44.
- VT – John Love 30-yard field goal, 6:18. Hurricanes 7–3. Drive: 8 plays, 48 yards, 3:52.

Second quarter

- MIA – Mark Fletcher Jr. 3-yard pass from Carson Beck (Carter Davis kick), 12:50. Hurricanes 14–3. Drive: 14 plays, 75 yards, 8:28.
- MIA – Carter Davis 46-yard field goal, 4:16. Hurricanes 17–3. Drive: 10 plays, 50 yards, 4:42.
- MIA – Carter Davis 40-yard field goal, 0:37. Hurricanes 20–3. Drive: 5 plays, 58 yards, 0:53.

Third quarter

- VT – Jeffrey Overton Jr. 38-yard run (John Love kick), 11:59. Hurricanes 20–10. Drive: 5 plays, 75 yards, 3:01.
- MIA – Girard Pingle Jr. 16-yard pass from Carson Beck (Carter Davis kick), 5:32. Hurricanes 27–10. Drive: 11 plays, 75 yards, 6:27.

Fourth quarter

- VT – William Watson III 3-yard run (John Love kick), 3:17. Hurricanes 27–17. Drive: 8 plays, 92 yards, 4:24.
- MIA – Malachi Toney 20-yard pass from Carson Beck (Carter Davis kick), 0:20. Hurricanes 34–17. Drive: 7 plays, 40 yards, 1:46.

Statistics	MIA	VT
First downs	22	20
Plays–yards	63–418	61–395
Rushes–yards	30–83	37–194
Passing yards	335	201
Passing: comp–att–int	28–33–0	14–24–0
Turnovers	0	1
Time of possession	33:29	26:31

Team	Category	Player	Statistics
Miami (FL)	Passing	Carson Beck	27/32, 320 yards, 4 TD
Miami (FL)	Rushing	Girard Pringle Jr.	14 carries, 49 yards
Miami (FL)	Receiving	Malachi Toney	12 receptions, 146 yards, TD
Virginia Tech	Passing	Kyron Drones	12/21, 124 yards
Virginia Tech	Rushing	Marcellous Hawkins	8 carries, 72 yards
Virginia Tech	Receiving	Ayden Greene	5 receptions, 95 yards

=== at No. 22 Pittsburgh ===
No. 12 Miami Hurricanes (9–2) at No. 22 Pittsburgh Panthers (8–3) – Game summary

Quarter	1	2	3	4	Total
No. 12 Hurricanes	3	14	14	7	38
No. 22 Panthers	0	7	0	0	7

at Acrisure Stadium • Pittsburgh, Pennsylvania

- Date: November 29
- Game time: 12:00 p.m. EST
- Game weather: Sunny • Temperature: 36 °F (2 °C) • Wind: SW 4 mph
- Game attendance: 49,845
- Referee: Riley Johnson
- TV announcers (ABC): Bob Wischusen (play-by-play), Louis Riddick (analyst), and Kris Budden (sideline reporter)

Game information

First quarter

- MIA – Carter Davis 29-yard field goal, 4:31. Hurricanes 3–0. Drive: 9 plays, 54 yards, 3:59.

Second quarter

- PIT – Justin Holmes 6-yard pass from Mason Heintschel (Trey Butkowski kick), 14:20. Panthers 7–3. Drive: 13 plays, 75 yards, 5:11.
- MIA – Elija Lofton 9-yard pass from Malachi Toney (Carter Davis kick), 11:07. Hurricanes 10–7. Drive: 7 plays, 56 yards, 3:07.
- MIA – Malachi Toney 22-yard pass from Carson Beck (Carter Davis kick), 1:55. Hurricanes 17–7. Drive: 9 plays, 75 yards, 4:15.

Third quarter

- MIA – Mark Fletcher 4-yard run (Carter Davis kick), 9:29. Hurricanes 24–7. Drive: 12 plays, 75 yards, 5:26.
- MIA – CharMar Brown 9-yard pass from Carson Beck (Carter Davis kick), 4:28. Hurricanes 31–7. Drive: 6 plays, 59 yards, 3:09.

Fourth quarter

- MIA – CJ Daniels 33-yard pass from Carson Beck (Bert Auburn kick), 0:41. Hurricanes 38–7. Drive: 7 plays, 65 yards, 3:17.

Statistics	MIA	PITT
First downs	28	11
Plays–yards	71–416	54–229
Rushes–yards	39–140	21–30
Passing yards	276	199
Passing: comp–att–int	24–32–1	22–33–1
Turnovers	1	1
Time of possession	35:55	24:05

Team	Category	Player	Statistics
Miami (FL)	Passing	Carson Beck	23/39, 267 yards, 3 TD, INT
Miami (FL)	Rushing	Girard Pringle Jr.	10 carries, 82 yards
Miami (FL)	Receiving	Malachi Toney	13 receptions, 126 yards, TD
Pittsburgh	Passing	Mason Heintschel	22/32, 199 yards, TD, INT
Pittsburgh	Rushing	Ja'Kyrian Turner	10 carries, 37 yards
Pittsburgh	Receiving	Raphael Williams Jr.	5 receptions, 66 yards

=== at No. 7 Texas A&M (College Football Playoff – First Round) ===
CFP First Round Game
No. 10 Miami Hurricanes (10–2) at No. 7 Texas A&M Aggies (11–1) — Game summary

Quarter	1	2	3	4	Total
No. 10 Hurricanes	0	0	3	7	10
No. 7 Aggies	0	0	0	3	3

at Kyle Field • College Station, TX

- Date: December 20
- Game time: 12:00 p.m.
- Game weather: Sunny • Temperature: 68 °F (20 °C) • Wind: SW at 14 miles per hour (23 km/h)
- Game attendance: 104,122
- Referee: Michael VanderVelde (Big 12)
- TV announcers (ABC/ESPN): Sean McDonough (play-by-play), Greg McElroy (analyst), Molly McGrath and Taylor McGregor (sideline)

Game information

First quarter

- No scoring plays.

Second quarter

- No scoring plays.

Third quarter

- MIA – Carter Davis 21-yard field goal, 10:34. Hurricanes 3–0. Drive: 9 plays, 72 yards, 4:26.

Fourth quarter

- TA&M – Randy Bond 35-yard field goal, 8:03. Tied 3–3. Drive: 16 plays, 67 yards, 7:30.
- MIA – Malachi Toney 11-yard pass from Carson Beck (Carter Davis kick), 1:49. Hurricanes 10–3. Drive: 6 plays, 86 yards, 2:18.

Statistics	MIA	TA&M
First downs	12	21
Plays–yards	49–278	75–326
Rushes–yards	28–175	35–89
Passing yards	103	237
Passing: Comp–Att–Int	14–21–0	25–40–2
Turnovers	1	3
Time of possession	26:16	33:44

Team	Category	Player	Statistics
Miami	Passing	Carson Beck	14/20, 103 yards, TD
Miami	Rushing	Mark Fletcher Jr.	17 carries, 172 yards
Miami	Receiving	Keelan Marion	3 receptions, 33 yards
Texas A&M	Passing	Marcel Reed	25/39, 237 yards, 2 INT
Texas A&M	Rushing	Marcel Reed	15 carries, 27 yards
Texas A&M	Receiving	Mario Craver	7 receptions, 92 yards

=== vs. No. 2 Ohio State (Cotton Bowl/CFP Quarterfinal) ===
CFP Quarterfinal at the Goodyear Cotton Bowl Classic
No. 10 Miami Hurricanes (11–2) vs. No. 2 Ohio State Buckeyes (12–1) — Game summary

Quarter	1	2	3	4	Total
No. 10 Hurricanes	0	14	3	7	24
No. 2 Buckeyes	0	0	7	7	14

at AT&T Stadium • Arlington, Texas

- Date: December 31
- Game time: 7:30 p.m.
- Game weather:
- Game attendance:
- Referee: Daniel Gautreaux (SEC)
- TV announcers (ESPN): Dave Pasch (play by play), Dusty Dvoracek (analyst), Taylor McGregor and Quint Kessenich (sideline reporters)

Game information

First quarter

- No scoring plays

Second quarter

- MIA – Mark Fletcher Jr. 9-yard pass from Carson Beck (Carter Davis kick), 13:31. Hurricanes 7–0. Drive: 13 plays, 83 yards, 8:04.
- MIA – Keionte Scott 72-yard interception return (Carter Davis kick), 11:59. Hurricanes 14–0.

Third quarter

- OSU – Bo Jackson 1-yard run (Jayden Fielding kick), 8:10. Hurricanes 14–7. Drive: 11 plays, 82 yards, 6:44.
- MIA – Carter Davis 49-yard field goal 3:01. Hurricanes 17–7. Drive: 9 plays, 43 yards, 5:04.

Fourth quarter

- OSU – Jeremiah Smith 14-yard pass from Julian Sayin (Jayden Fielding kick), 13:28. Hurricanes 17–14. Drive: 10 plays, 75 yards, 4:33.
- MIA – CharMar Brown 5-yard run (Carter Davis kick), 0:55. Hurricanes 24–14. Drive: 10 plays, 70 yards, 5:01.

Statistics	MIA	OSU
First downs	18	18
Plays–yards	63–291	59–332
Rushes–yards	37–153	24–45
Passing yards	138	287
Passing: comp–att–int	19–26–0	22–35–2
Turnovers	1	2
Time of possession	33:20	26:40

Team	Category	Player	Statistics
Miami	Passing	Carson Beck	19/26, 138 yards, TD
Miami	Rushing	Mark Fletcher Jr.	19 carries, 90 yards
Miami	Receiving	CJ Daniels	5 receptions, 49 yards
Ohio State	Passing	Julian Sayin	22/35, 287 yards, TD, 2 INT
Ohio State	Rushing	Bo Jackson	11 carries, 55 yards, TD
Ohio State	Receiving	Jeremiah Smith	7 receptions, 157 yards, TD

=== vs. No. 6 Ole Miss (Fiesta Bowl/CFP Semifinal) ===
CFP Semifinal at the VRBO Fiesta Bowl
No. 10 Miami Hurricanes (12–2) at No. 6 Ole Miss Rebels (13–1) — Game summary

Quarter	1	2	3	4	Total
No. 10 Hurricanes	3	14	0	14	31
No. 6 Rebels	0	13	3	11	27

at State Farm Stadium • Glendale, AZ

- Date: January 8
- Game time: 7:30 p.m.
- Game weather: Indoor
- Game attendance: 67,928
- Referee: Rod Snodgrass (Big Ten)
- TV announcers (ESPN): Chris Fowler (play by play), Kirk Herbstreit (analyst), Holly Rowe and Laura Rutledge (sideline reporters)

Game information

First quarter

- MIA – Carter Davis 38-yard field goal, 6:22. Hurricanes 3–0. Drive: 13 plays, 44 yards, 7:21.

Second quarter

- MISS – Kewan Lacy 73-yard run (Lucas Carneiro kick), 14:50. Rebels 7–3. Drive: 2 plays, 80 yards, 0:34.
- MIA – CharMar Brown 4-yard run (Carter Davis kick), 7:09. Hurricanes 10–7. Drive: 15 plays, 75 yards, 7:41.
- MISS – Lucas Carneiro 42-yard field goal, 4:38. Tied 10–10. Drive: 7 plays, 51 yards, 2:31.
- MIA – Keelan Marion 52-yard pass from Carson Beck (Carter Davis kick), 2:18. Hurricanes 17–10. Drive: 5 plays, 75 yards, 2:00.
- MISS – Lucas Carneiro 58-yard field goal, 0:11. Hurricanes 17–13. Drive: 8 plays, 29 yards, 0:44.

Third quarter

- MISS – Lucas Carneiro 54-yard field goal, 0:22. Hurricanes 17–16. Drive: 9 plays, 49 yards, 2:57.

Fourth quarter

- MISS – Lucas Carneiro 21-yard field goal, 7:00. Rebels 19–17. Drive: 14 plays, 86 yards, 5:19.
- MIA – Malachi Toney 36-yard pass from Carson Beck (Carter Davis kick), 5:04. Hurricanes 24–19. Drive: 4 plays, 75 yards, 1:56.
- MISS – Dae'Quan Wright 24-yard pass from Trinidad Chambliss (Caleb Odom–Tridad Chambliss pass), 3:13. Rebels 27–24. Drive: 6 plays, 75 yards, 1:51.
- MIA – Carson Beck 3-yard run (Carter Davis kick), 0:18. Hurricanes 31–27. Drive: 15 plays, 75 yards, 2:55.

Statistics	MIA	MISS
First downs	28	23
Plays–yards	88–459	60–398
Rushes–yards	51–191	21–121
Passing yards	268	277
Passing: Comp–Att–Int	23–37–1	23–39–0
Turnovers	1	0
Time of possession	41:22	18:38

Team	Category	Player	Statistics
Miami	Passing	Carson Beck	23/37, 268 yards, 2 TD, INT
Miami	Rushing	Mark Fletcher Jr.	22 carries, 133 yards
Miami	Receiving	Keelan Marion	7 receptions, 114 yards, TD
Ole Miss	Passing	Trinidad Chambliss	23/37, 277 yards, TD
Ole Miss	Rushing	Kewan Lacy	11 carries, 103 yards, TD
Ole Miss	Receiving	De'Zhaun Stribling	5 receptions, 77 yards

=== vs. No. 1 Indiana (CFP National Championship Game) ===
2026 College Football Playoff National Championship
No. 10 Miami Hurricanes (13–2) vs. No. 1 Indiana Hoosiers (15–0) – Game summary

Quarter	1	2	3	4	Total
No. 10 Hurricanes	0	0	7	14	21
No. 1 Hoosiers	3	7	7	10	27

at Hard Rock Stadium • Miami Gardens, FL

- Date: January 19, 2026
- Game time: 6:30 pm CST
- Game weather: Sunny
- Game attendance: 67,227
- Referee: Michael VanderVelde (Big 12)
- TV announcers (ESPN): Chris Fowler (play-by-play), Kirk Herbstreit (analyst), Holly Rowe, and Molly McGrath (sideline reporters)

Game information

First quarter

- IU – Nico Radicic 34-yard field goal, 2:42. Hoosiers 3–0. Drive: 12 plays, 55 yards, 5:56.

Second quarter

- IU – Riley Nowakowski 1-yard run (Nico Radicic kick), 6:13. Hoosiers 10–0. Drive: 14 plays, 85 yards, 6:28.

Third quarter

- MIA – Mark Fletcher Jr. 57-yard run (Carter Davis kick), 11:06. Hoosiers 10–7. Drive: 2 plays, 62 yards, 0:46.
- IU – Isaiah Jones blocked punt recovery (Nico Radicic kick), 5:04. Hoosiers 17–7.

Fourth quarter

- MIA – Mark Fletcher Jr. 3-yard run (Carter Davis kick), 14:57. Hoosiers 17–14. Drive: 10 plays, 81 yards, 5:07.
- IU – Fernando Mendoza 12-yard run (Nico Radicic kick), 9:18. Hoosiers 24–14. Drive: 12 plays, 75 yards, 5:39.
- MIA – Malachi Toney 22-yard pass from Carson Beck (Carter Davis kick), 6:37. Hoosiers 24–21. Drive: 8 plays, 91 yards, 2:34.
- IU – Nico Radicic 35-yard field goal, 1:42. Hoosiers 27–21. Drive: 11 plays, 57 yards, 4:55.

Statistics	MIA	IU
First downs	15	20
Plays–yards	53–342	72–317
Rushes–yards	21–110	45–131
Passing yards	232	186
Passing: Comp–Att–Int	19–32–1	16–27–0
Turnovers	1	0
Time of possession	23:36	36:24

Team	Category	Player	Statistics
Miami	Passing	Carson Beck	19/32, 232 yards, TD, INT
Miami	Rushing	Mark Fletcher Jr.	17 carries, 112 yards
Miami	Receiving	Malachi Toney	10 receptions, 122 yards, TD
Indiana	Passing	Fernando Mendoza	16/27, 186 yards
Indiana	Rushing	Kaelon Black	17 carries, 79 yards
Indiana	Receiving	Omar Cooper Jr.	5 receptions, 71 yards
