= 2025 Cotton Bowl Classic (December) =

Postseason college football bowl game

2025 Goodyear Cotton Bowl Classic
- College Football Playoff Quarterfinal; 90th Cotton Bowl Classic
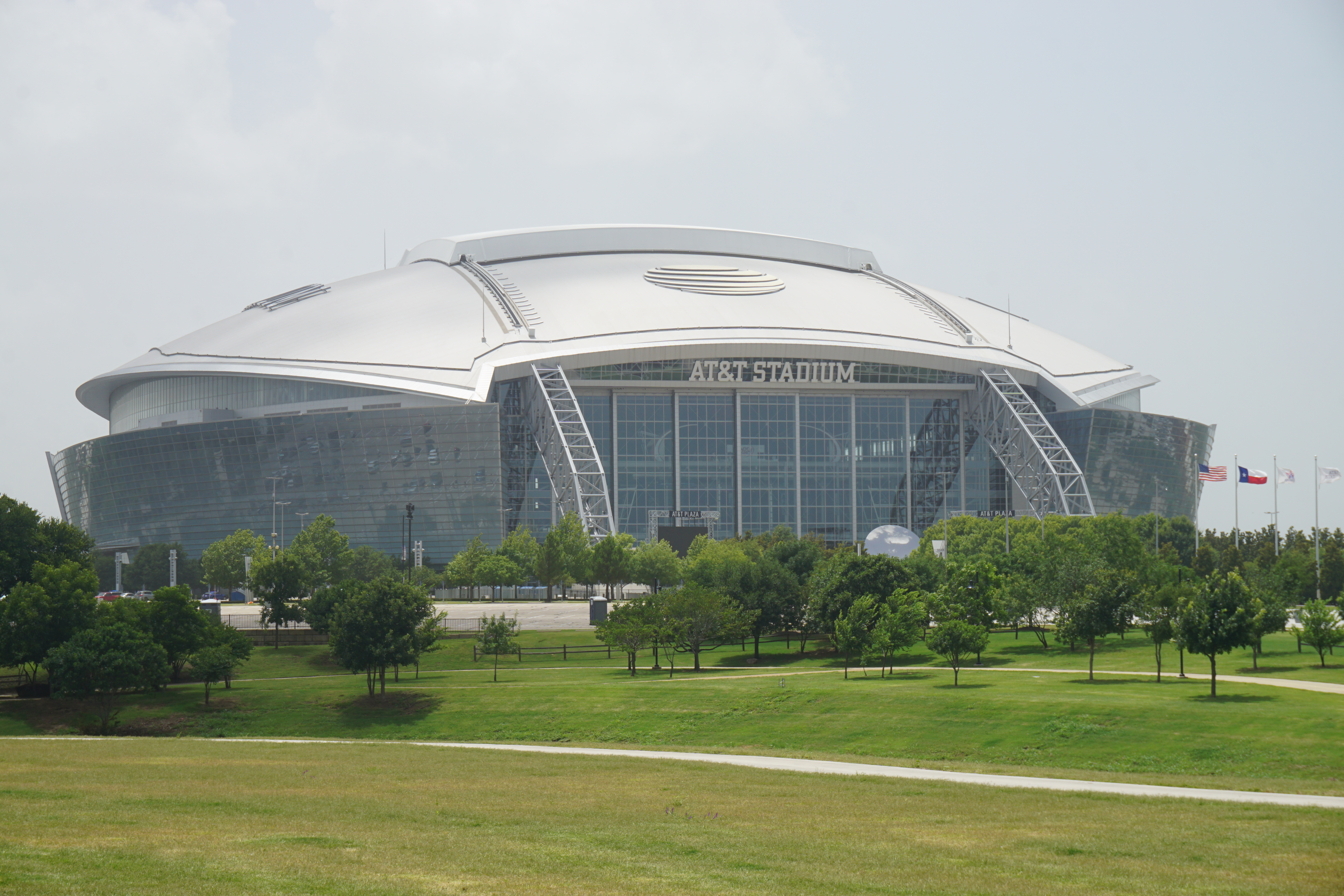
- AT&T Stadium in Arlington, Texas, the site of the Cotton Bowl Classic
Miami Hurricanes	Ohio State Buckeyes
(11–2)	(12–1)
ACC	Big Ten
24	14
Head coach: Mario Cristobal	Head coach: Ryan Day
AP / Coaches / CFP; 10 / 10 / 10	AP / Coaches / CFP; 3 / 3 / 2
	1	2	3	4	Total
Miami	0	14	3	7	24
Ohio State	0	0	7	7	14
- Date: December 31, 2025
- Season: 2025
- Stadium: AT&T Stadium
- Location: Arlington, Texas
- MOP: Offensive: Mark Fletcher Jr., RB; Defensive: Keionte Scott, CB
- Favorite: Ohio State by 9.5
- Referee: Daniel Gautreaux (SEC)
- Attendance: 71,323

United States TV coverage
- Network: ESPN
- Announcers: Dave Pasch (play-by-play), Dusty Dvoracek (analyst), Taylor McGregor and Quint Kessenich (sideline reporters)
- Nielsen ratings: 19 million viewers

The 2025 Cotton Bowl Classic was a college football bowl game played on December 31, 2025, at AT&T Stadium in Arlington, Texas. The 90th annual game was one of the 2025–26 bowl games concluding the 2025 FBS football season. The Cotton Bowl was one of the College Football Playoff (CFP) quarterfinal games, with the winner advancing to the semifinals. The game began at approximately 6:30 p.m. CST and aired on ESPN. Sponsored by the Goodyear Tire and Rubber Company, the game was officially known as the 2025 CFP Quarterfinal at the Goodyear Cotton Bowl Classic.

The Miami Hurricanes of the Atlantic Coast Conference (ACC) upset the defending national champion Ohio State Buckeyes of the Big Ten Conference, 24–14. This was Miami’s first victory in a major bowl game since the 2004 Orange Bowl.

== Background ==
The Cotton Bowl Classic was a quarterfinal game of the 2025–26 College Football Playoff (CFP). No. 2 Ohio State, being one of the top four teams in the final CFP rankings, received an automatic bye in the CFP and was selected to play in the Cotton Bowl for the third consecutive year. Miami (FL), the No. 10 seed in the playoff, defeated Texas A&M, the No. 7 seed, in the first round, 10–3, to advance to this game.

The winning team, Miami, advanced to the CFP semifinals, facing the winner of the Sugar Bowl in the Fiesta Bowl.

First round			Cotton Bowl
			2	Ohio State	14
10	Miami (FL)	10	10	Miami (FL)	24
7	Texas A&M	3

== Teams ==
The game featured the Ohio State Buckeyes and the Miami Hurricanes. This was the sixth meeting between the two teams—each team won two of their prior meetings, and a 2010 win by Ohio State was later vacated. This is the teams' first meeting since the 2011 season, when the unranked Hurricanes upset the 17th-ranked Buckeyes, 24–6.

This was the teams' first postseason meeting since the 2003 Fiesta Bowl, the designated BCS national championship game of the 2002 college football season. In that contest, the second-ranked Buckeyes, a 12-point underdog, upset the top-ranked Hurricanes, 31–24, in double overtime to win their first outright national championship since 1968.

=== Ohio State Buckeyes ===
Ohio State won all 12 of their regular-season games, including wins over three ranked opponents: Texas, Illinois, and Michigan. The Buckeyes qualified for the 2025 Big Ten Football Championship Game, which they lost to Indiana, 13–10. Ranked first in the AP poll for most of the season, Ohio State entered the Cotton Bowl Classic ranked second in the AP poll and as the number-two seed in the CFP, and were considered the co-favorite to win the national championship, along with Indiana.

=== Miami Hurricanes ===
Miami opened their season with five consecutive wins, including three over ranked opponents: Notre Dame, South Florida, and Florida State. They suffered two losses in their next three games, to Louisville and SMU, then won their final four regular-season games. The Hurricanes were seeded 10th in the CFP, and defeated Texas A&M in College Station, Texas, in a first-round contest. Miami enters the Cotton Bowl Classic with an overall record of 11–2.

== Game summary ==
College Football Playoff Quarterfinal at the 2025 Goodyear Cotton Bowl Classic

Quarter	1	2	3	4	Total
(10) No. 10 Miami (FL)	0	14	3	7	24
(2) No. 2 Ohio State	0	0	7	7	14

at AT&T Stadium • Arlington, Texas

- Date: Wednesday, December 31, 2025
- Game time: 6:30 p.m. CST
- Game weather: n/a (indoor)
- Game attendance: 71,323
- Referee: Daniel Gautreaux
- TV announcers (ESPN): Dave Pasch (play-by-play), Dusty Dvoracek (analyst), Taylor McGregor and Quint Kessenich (sideline reporters)

Both teams opened the game with a punt, and Miami's second drive was cut short in the Ohio State red zone following a Mark Fletcher Jr. fumble. After an Ohio State punt, Miami scored the game's first points on a touchdown pass from Carson Beck to Fletcher. They doubled their lead after Keionte Scott intercepted a Julian Sayin pass and returned it 72 yards for a touchdown with 12 minutes remaining in the half. Each team punted twice over the next nine minutes. Ohio State resumed possession at their own 2-yard line with 1:30 to play and drove to the Miami 31-yard line, but Jayden Fielding's 49 yard field goal attempt was unsuccessful.

Ohio State received the ball to begin the second half, and they drove 82 yards to score their first points on a 1-yard Bo Jackson rush. Miami's ensuing drive reached the Ohio State 32-yard line in eight plays; following a fumble by Malachi Toney which was recovered by the Hurricanes, Carter Davis made a 49-yard field goal to increase Miami's lead to ten points. Ohio State drove 58 yards to the Miami 22-yard line before the third quarter ended, and they scored three plays later on a 14-yard pass from Sayin to Jeremiah Smith. Both teams punted once before Miami extended their lead to ten points on a 5-yard rush by CharMar Brown with under a minute remaining in the game. Sayin was intercepted on the second play of Ohio State's ensuing possession, allowing Miami to secure a 24–14 victory.

Scoring summary

Quarter	Time	Drive			Team	Scoring information	Score	
Quarter	Time	Plays	Yards	TOP	Team	Scoring information	Miami	Ohio State
2	13:31	13	83	8:04	Miami	Mark Fletcher Jr. 9-yard touchdown reception from Carson Beck, Carter Davis kick good	7	0
2	11:49				Miami	Interception returned 72 yards for touchdown by Keionte Scott, Carter Davis kick good	14	0
3	8:10	11	82	6:44	Ohio State	Bo Jackson 1-yard touchdown run, Jayden Fielding kick good	14	7
3	3:01	9	43	5:04	Miami	49-yard field goal by Carter Davis	17	7
4	13:28	10	75	4:33	Ohio State	Jeremiah Smith 14-yard touchdown reception from Julian Sayin, Jayden Fielding kick good	17	14
4	0:55	10	70	5:01	Miami	CharMar Brown 5-yard touchdown run, Carter Davis kick good	24	14
"TOP" = time of possession. For other American football terms, see Glossary of American football.							24	14

== Statistics ==
Team statistical comparison
Statistic	Miami	Ohio State
First downs	18	18
First downs rushing	7	3
First downs passing	11	15
First downs penalty	0	0
Third down efficiency	7–14	3–10
Fourth down efficiency	1–1	1–1
Total plays–net yards	63–366	59–353
Rushing attempts–net yards	37–153	24–45
Yards per rush	4.1	1.9
Yards passing	138	287
Pass completions–attempts	19–26	22–35
Interceptions thrown	0	2
Punt returns–total yards	1–2	1–3
Kickoff returns–total yards	0–0	1–18
Punts–average yardage	4–46.3	5–44.2
Fumbles–lost	3–1	0–0
Penalties–yards	0–0	2–15
Time of possession	33:20	26:40

Miami statistics
Hurricanes passing
	C–A	Yds	TD–INT
Carson Beck	19–26	138	1–0
Hurricanes rushing
	Car	Yds	TD
Mark Fletcher Jr.	19	90	0
CharMar Brown	5	26	1
Carson Beck	7	23	0
Girard Pringle Jr.	3	12	0
Malachi Toney	1	4	0
Team	2	-2	0
Hurricanes receiving
	Rec	Yds	TD
CJ Daniels	5	49	0
Keelan Marion	5	36	0
Mark Fletcher Jr.	2	25	1
Malachi Toney	5	16	0
Joshisa Trader	1	7	0
CharMar Brown	1	5	0

Ohio State statistics
Buckeyes passing
	C–A	Yds	TD–INT
Julian Sayin	22–35	287	1–2
Buckeyes rushing
	Car	Yds	TD
Bo Jackson	11	55	1
CJ Donaldson	7	31	0
Jeremiah Smith	1	1	0
Julian Sayin	5	-42	0
Buckeyes receiving
	Rec	Yds	TD
Jeremiah Smith	7	157	1
Carnell Tate	3	37	0
Brandon Inniss	4	34	0
CJ Donaldson	5	31	0
Will Kacmarek	3	28	0
