= Xavier Lucas =

American football player

No. 6 – Miami Hurricanes
- Position: Cornerback
- Class: Junior

Personal information
- Listed height: 6 ft 2 in (1.88 m)
- Listed weight: 203 lb (92 kg)

Career information
- High school: American Heritage (Plantation, Florida)
- College: Wisconsin (2024); Miami (2025–present)
- Stats at ESPN

Xavier Lucas is an American college football cornerback for the Miami Hurricanes. He previously played for the Wisconsin Badgers.

== Early life ==
Xavier Lucas was born to Keisha Lawson and Excel Lucas. He attended American Heritage School in Plantation, Florida, where he excelled in football and track and field. As a senior in 2023, Lucas tallied 26 tackles and four interceptions. He then helped the track team win the state title in the 4 × 100 metres relay at the 2024 Florida High School Athletic Association championships, where he also placed second in the long jump and third in the 100 metres.

Lucas was rated as a four-star recruit by Rivals.com. He received offers from over 30 NCAA Division I programs, such as Alabama, Auburn, Florida State, Miami, Michigan, Iowa, Illinois, Indiana, Nebraska, Oklahoma, Texas A&M, and Wisconsin. On August 11, 2023, Lucas committed to playing college football at Wisconsin. Despite Wisconsin having to "h[o]ld off a late charge" from Miami, he signed with the Badgers during the early signing period in December.

== College career ==
=== Wisconsin ===
Ahead of his freshman season in 2024, Lucas had a strong showing in the Badgers' fall camp. He settled into a backup cornerback role before their season opener against Western Michigan. Lucas made his collegiate debut in the game and recorded his first career interception in the final minutes of a 28–14 win over the Broncos. He made his first career start in a defeat to Nebraska in November, tallying a season-high seven tackles. Lucas played in all 12 games, (Note: Alternatively reported as 11 games played.) finishing the season with 18 tackles, one sack, and one interception. On December 19, 2024, he announced he would be entering the NCAA transfer portal.

Wisconsin refused his request to enter his name into the portal, ostentibly violating NCAA rules. Lucas hired a lawyer in January 2026, who threatened legal action against Wisconsin and the NCAA over antitrust claims. The school claimed that he had signed a two-year revenue-sharing deal to return to the Badgers before requesting a transfer. His lawyer said it was only a memorandum of understanding contingent on the approval of the then-ongoing House v. NCAA antitrust settlement, and that it was not enforceable until the settlement was finalized. According to Yahoo Sports, this was the "first known public dispute between a player and school related to a revenue-share contract."

On January 17, Yahoo Sports reported that Lucas would withdraw from classes at Wisconsin and enroll academically at Miami despite not formally entering the transfer portal. A statement from the NCAA said that "[its] rules do not prevent a student-athlete from unenrolling from an institution, enrolling at a new institution and competing immediately." The next day, Wisconsin expressed its disagreement with Miami's conduct, claiming it had "credible information indicating impermissible contact" between Lucas and Miami while saying they would "evaluate all options going forward". The statement described the case as a "significant moment in the evolution of college athletics." The Big Ten Conference also issued a statement in support of Wisconsin, calling the allegations "very troubling."

On June 20, Wisconsin filed a complaint against Miami in state circuit court in Dane County over alleged tortious interference. The suit, filed two weeks after the approval of House v. NCAA, was described by Ross Dellgenger of Yahoo Sports as a "first-of-its-kind and, perhaps, a precedent-setting move". In August, Miami filed a motion to dismiss the case.

=== Miami ===
Lucas enrolled at Miami in January 2025 and joined the Hurricanes for spring practices in March and April. He was a standout in the secondary and "quickly made a strong impression on Miami's coaching staff." Lucas continued his strong performances into fall camp and started opposite O.J. Frederique in the Hurricanes' season-opening 27–24 win over Notre Dame. He recorded his first interception of the season in a 42–7 win over Stanford on October 25. Lucas started in the College Football Playoff first round, the Cotton Bowl, and the Fiesta Bowl. He was ejected for targeting after a hit on Ole Miss receiver Cayden Lee in the fourth quarter of Miami's 31–27 Fiesta Bowl win, which resulted in an automatic suspension for the first two quarters of the national championship game versus Indiana. Lucas appeared in the second half of the 27–21 defeat. He finished the 2025 season with 45 tackles, two tackles for loss, one sack, one interception, and one forced fumble.

== Personal life ==
Lucas is from Pompano Beach, Florida, and has one sibling. His father, Excel, played college football at Temple.
