= Marquise Lightfoot =

American football player

No. 8 – Miami Hurricanes
- Position: Defensive end
- Class: Junior

Personal information
- Listed height: 6 ft 5 in (1.96 m)
- Listed weight: 230 lb (104 kg)

Career information
- High school: Kenwood Academy (Chicago, Illinois)
- College: Miami (FL) (2024–present)
- Stats at ESPN

Marquise Lightfoot is an American college football defensive end for the Miami Hurricanes.

== Early life ==
Lightfoot attended Kenwood Academy in Chicago, Illinois. As a junior, he had 122 tackles and nine sacks. A five-star recruit, he was selected to play in the 2024 All-American Bowl. Lightfoot committed to the University of Miami to play college football.

== College career ==
As a true freshman at Miami in 2024, he played in nine games. As a sophomore in 2025, he appeared in all 16 games and made one start as a backup to Rueben Bain Jr. and Akheem Mesidor, recording 25 tackles and 2.5 sacks. Lightfoot returned to Miami for his junior season in 2026.
