= Bissainthe =

Bissainthe is a Haitian surname. Notable people with the surname include:

- Bicou Bissainthe (born 1999), Haitian footballer
- Toto Bissainthe (1934–1994), Haitian actress, singer and songwriter
- Wesley Bissainthe (born 2004), American football player
