= Armondo Blount =

American football player (born 2007)

No. 18 – Miami Hurricanes
- Position: Defensive end
- Class: Junior

Personal information
- Born: February 18, 2007 (age 19)
- Listed height: 6 ft 4 in (1.93 m)
- Listed weight: 276 lb (125 kg)

Career information
- High school: Miami Central (Miami, Florida)
- College: Miami (FL) (2024–present)
- Stats at ESPN

Armondo Blount (born February 18, 2007) is an American college football defensive end for the Miami Hurricanes.

== Early life ==
Blount originally attended Dillard High School in Fort Lauderdale, Florida before transferring to Miami Central Senior High School in Miami, Florida for his senior year. As a senior, he had 58 tackles and 11 sacks. Blount was rated as a five-star recruit. He originally committed to play college football at the University of Miami before flipping his commitment to Florida State University and then ultimately back to Miami.

== College career ==
Blount played in eight games and had two tackles his true freshman year at Miami in 2024. As a sophomore in 2025, he was a backup to Rueben Bain Jr. and Akheem Mesidor, recording 17 tackles and 2.5 sacks over 15 games. Blount returned to Miami for his junior season in 2026.
