= List of Tampa Bay Buccaneers first-round draft picks =

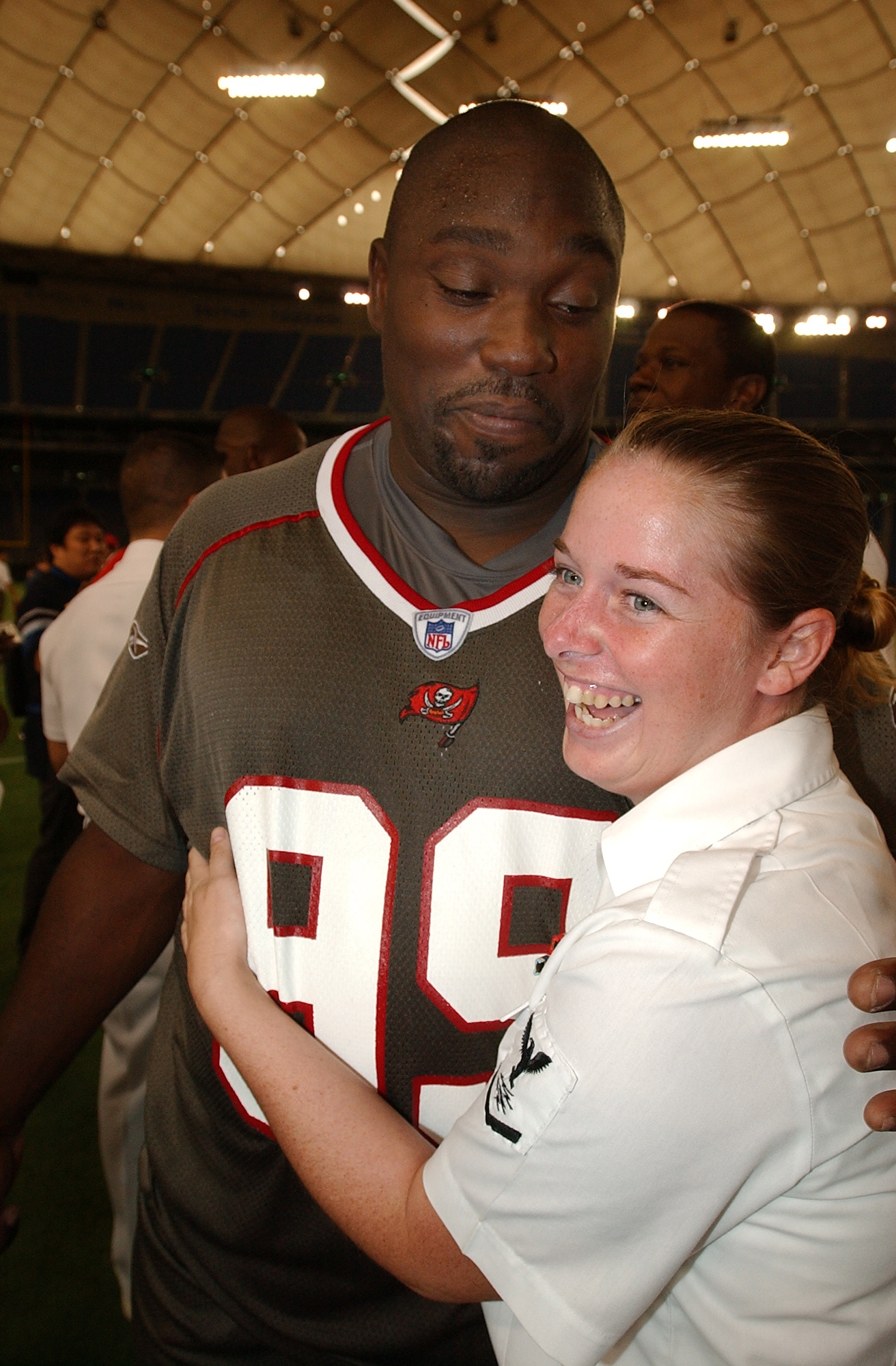
Warren Sapp was the Buccaneers first round pick in 1995

The Tampa Bay Buccaneers joined the National Football League (NFL) in 1976 with the Seattle Seahawks.

Every April, each NFL franchise adds new players to its roster through a collegiate draft at the "NFL Annual Player Selection Meeting", more commonly known as the NFL Draft. Teams are ranked in reverse order based on the previous season's record, with the team with the worst record having the first selection. The two exceptions to this order are made for teams that appeared in the previous season's Super Bowl; the Super Bowl champion is the last team to select and the Super Bowl runner up selects right before them. This order is subject to teams trading away selections to other teams for different selections, players, cash or a combination thereof. Thus, it is common for a team's actual draft pick to differ from their assigned draft pick, or for a team to have multiple or no draft picks the first round due to trades.

The Buccaneers have had the first overall pick on six occasions. Twice in 1978 and 1984, they traded it away. Three eventual Hall of Famers were selected by the Buccaneers. The Buccaneers' first selection as an NFL team was Lee Roy Selmon, a defensive lineman from Oklahoma. The team's most-recent first-round selection was Rueben Bain Jr., a linebacker from the University of Miami.

== Key ==
Table key
^	Indicates the player was inducted into the Pro Football Hall of Fame.
*	Selected number one overall
†	Indicates the player was selected for the Pro Bowl at any time in their career.
—	The Buccaneers did not draft a player in the first round that year.
Year	Each year links to an article about that particular NFL Draft.
Pick	Indicates the number of the pick within the first round
Position	Indicates the position of the player in the NFL
College	The player's college football team

== Player selections ==
Tampa Bay Buccaneers first-round draft picks
Year	Pick	Player name	Position	College	Notes
1976	1	Lee Roy Selmon *^	DE	Oklahoma	
1977	1	Ricky Bell *	RB	USC	
1978	17	Doug Williams	QB	Grambling	^{[a]}
1979	No pick				^{[b]}
1980	22	Ray Snell	G	Wisconsin	
1981	7	Hugh Green †	LB	Pittsburgh	
1982	18	Sean Farrell	G	Penn State	
1983	No pick				^{[c]}
1984	No pick				^{[d]}
1985	8	Ron Holmes	DE	Washington	
1986	1	Bo Jackson †*	RB	Auburn	^{[e]}
1986	25	Roderick Jones	DB	SMU	
1987	1	Vinny Testaverde *	QB	Miami (FL)	^{[f]}
1988	4	Paul Gruber	OT	Wisconsin	
1989	6	Broderick Thomas	LB	Nebraska	
1990	4	Keith McCants	LB	Alabama	
1991	7	Charles McRae	OT	Tennessee	
1992	No pick				^{[g]}
1993	6	Eric Curry	DE	Alabama	
1994	6	Trent Dilfer	QB	Fresno State	
1995	12	Warren Sapp ^	DT	Miami (FL)	
1995	28	Derrick Brooks ^	LB	Florida State	^{[i]}
1996	12	Regan Upshaw	DE	California	
1996	22	Marcus Jones	DT	North Carolina	^{[j]}
1997	12	Warrick Dunn †	RB	Florida State	^{[k]}
1997	16	Reidel Anthony	WR	Florida	^{[l]}
1998	No pick				^{[m]}
1999	15	Booger McFarland	DT	LSU	
2000	No pick				^{[n]}^{[o]}
2001	14	Kenyatta Walker	OT	Florida	^{[p]}
2002	No pick				^{[r]}
2003	No pick				^{[r]}
2004	15	Michael Clayton	WR	LSU	
2005	5	Carnell Williams	RB	Auburn	
2006	23	Davin Joseph †	G	Oklahoma	
2007	4	Gaines Adams	DE	Clemson	
2008	20	Aqib Talib †	CB	Kansas	
2009	17	Josh Freeman	QB	Kansas State	
2010	3	Gerald McCoy †	DT	Oklahoma	
2011	20	Adrian Clayborn	DE	Iowa	
2012	7	Mark Barron	S	Alabama	
2012	31	Doug Martin †	RB	Boise State	
2013	No pick				
2014	7	Mike Evans †	WR	Texas A&M	
2015	1	Jameis Winston †*	QB	Florida State	
2016	11	Vernon Hargreaves	CB	Florida	
2017	19	O. J. Howard	TE	Alabama	
2018	12	Vita Vea †	DT	Washington	
2019	5	Devin White †	LB	LSU	
2020	13	Tristan Wirfs †	OT	Iowa	
2021	32	Joe Tryon-Shoyinka	OLB	Washington	
2022	No pick				
2023	19	Calijah Kancey	DT	Pittsburgh	
2024	26	Graham Barton	C	Duke	
2025	19	Emeka Egbuka	WR	Ohio State	
2026	15	Rueben Bain Jr.	LB	Miami (FL)	

== Footnotes ==
- ^{a} The Buccaneers traded their first overall pick to the Houston Oilers for Jimmie Giles, this pick and a second-round pick in this draft and the Oilers third and fifth-round picks in the 1979 draft.
- ^{b} The Buccaneers traded the 4th overall selection to Chicago for Wally Chambers.
- ^{c} The Buccaneers traded their first-round pick to the Chicago Bears for their 1982 second-round pick.
- ^{d} The Buccaneers traded their first-round pick to the Cincinnati Bengals in 1983 for Jack Thompson.
- ^{e} Jackson refused to play for the Buccaneers, and instead played baseball for the Kansas City Royals. In 1987, he was drafted by the Los Angeles Raiders and played both professional sports to an All-Pro level.
- ^{g} The Buccaneers traded away their second overall pick to the Indianapolis Colts for Chris Chandler.
- ^{h} The Buccaneers traded their seventh overall pick to the Eagles for this pick and two second-round picks.
- ^{i} The Buccaneers acquired this pick from the Dallas Cowboys for two second-round picks.
- ^{j} The additional first-round pick was acquired from the Indianapolis Colts for Craig Erickson.
- ^{k} The Buccaneers originally traded their 8th overall pick to the Jets to move up two picks. They then traded that pick to the Seattle Seahawks for this pick and a third-round pick.
- ^{l} This pick was acquired from the San Diego Chargers in return for a second-round pick the previous year.
- ^{m} The Buccaneers traded their first-round pick to Raiders for two second-round picks.
- ^{n} The Buccaneers gained an additional first-round pick from the San Diego Chargers as a result of a draft-day deal in 1998.
- ^{o} The Buccaneers traded their first-pick and one they acquired from the Chargers in 1998, to the New York Jets for Keyshawn Johnson.
- ^{p} The Buccaneers had the 21st overall selection but made a draft-day deal with the Buffalo Bills to move up seven picks.
- ^{q} The Buccaneers traded linebacker Hugh Green to the Miami Dolphins for the first (#25 overall pick) and second-round picks.
- ^{r} The Buccaneers traded their 2002 and 2003 first-round picks to the Oakland Raiders as part of a trade for Jon Gruden.
