= Justin Scott =

Justin Scott may refer to:

- Justin Scott (American football) (born 2006), American football player
- Justin Scott (ice hockey)
- Justin Scott (musician)
- Big K.R.I.T. (rapper), born Justin Scott
- Justin Scott (writer)
