= Girard Pringle Jr. =

American football player

No. 0 – Miami Hurricanes
- Position: Running back
- Class: Sophomore

Personal information
- Listed height: 5 ft 10 in (1.78 m)
- Listed weight: 190 lb (86 kg)

Career information
- High school: Armwood (Seffner, Florida)
- College: Miami (2025–present)
- Stats at ESPN

Girard Pringle Jr. is an American college football running back for the Miami Hurricanes.

== Early life ==
Pringle Jr. attended Armwood High School in Seffner, Florida. He rushed for 1,732 yards with 24 touchdowns his junior season and 1,199 yards with 19 touchdowns his senior year. He won the Guy Toph Trophy, given to the best player in Hillsborough County, his senior year. Pringle Jr. committed to the University of Miami to play college football.

== College career ==
Pringle Jr. earned early playing time behind starter Mark Fletcher Jr. his true freshman year at Miami in 2025. He started his first career game against NC State, rushing 17 times for 116 yards.

=== Statistics ===
Year	Team	Games		Rushing				Receiving			
Year	Team	GP	GS	Att	Yds	Avg	TD	Rec	Yds	Avg	TD
2025	Miami	9	1	62	375	6.0	4	4	53	13.3	1
2026	Miami	2	0	10	26	2.6	1	2	35	17.5	0
Career		11	1	72	401	5.6	5	6	88	14.7	1
