= Miami Central Senior High School =

Public high school in Miami-Dade County, Florida, United States

Miami Central High School
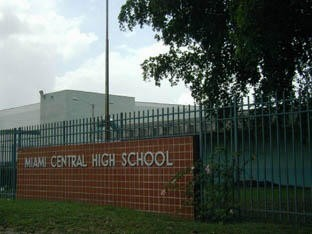

Location
- 1781 Northwest 95th Street; Miami, Florida 33147; United States; 25.86178°N 80.2283°W

Information
- Type: Public
- Established: 1959
- School district: Miami-Dade County Public Schools
- Principal: Raymond Sands
- Teaching staff: 81.00 (FTE)
- Grades: 9–12
- Enrollment: 1,404 (2023–2024)
- Student to teacher ratio: 17.33
- Campus: Urban
- Colors: Green, White
- Nickname: Rockets
- Website: miamicentral.dadeschools.net

Miami Central Senior High School is a secondary school located at 1781 NW 95th Street in the Liberty City neighborhood of Miami, Florida. Its current principal is Raymond Sands.

Miami Central opened in 1959. Its school mascot and colors were chosen in honor of NASA and the inception of its space program, which was an event at the time of the school's opening.

In the early 1990s, the school acquired a computer science magnet program, placed as part of the district's initiative to devote school space to certain magnet programs so as to attract minority students to less diverse schools.

The school serves most of the northern fringes of the city of Miami, as well as parts of North Miami, Opa-locka, the village of Miami Shores, and the village of El Portal.

== History ==
Kathleen McGrory wrote in 2009 that Miami Central was "historically beset by chronic truancy, declining enrollment, dispirited staff and general disrepair". That year the school was under threat of being closed and/or having special programs taken away under federal mandates that would penalize the school for a sixth failure on the Florida Comprehensive Assessment Test (FCAT); for the five previous consecutive years it had received "F" grades.

In 2009 Doug Rodriguez, who previously served as the principal at Ronald W. Reagan/Doral High School, volunteered to become the principal of Miami Central.

In 2010 the school was chosen to receive an American Recovery and Investment Act School Improvement Grant, because it had mostly ethnic minority children and had a low academic performance. President Barack Obama visited the school when he presented the SIG program to the American people.

== Demographics ==
The demographic breakdown of the 1,926 students enrolled for the 2012–2013 school year was:

- Male – 60.3%
- Female – 55.7%
- Native American/Alaskan – 0.1%
- Asian/Pacific islanders – 0.3%
- Black – 85.7%
- Hispanic – 25.7%
- White – 0.5%
- multiracial – >0.1%

80.7% of students were eligible for free or reduced lunch.

Miami Central has a large Haitian student population.

As of 2009 there were 1,600 students, with 14% in special education and over 50% from low-income families.

== Academics ==
As part of the state's Accountability program, it grades a school by a complex formula that looks at both current scores and annual improvement on the Reading, Math, Writing and Science FCATs.

These are the school's grades by the year since the FCAT began in 1998:

- 1998–1999: D
- 1999–2000: D
- 2000–2001: D
- 2001–2002: D (280 points)
- 2002–2003: D (283 points)
- 2003–2004: F (268 points)
- 2004–2005: F (264 points)
- 2005–2006: F (278 points)
- 2006–2007: F (351 points)
- 2007–2008: F (376 points)
- 2008–2009: D (417 points)
- 2009–2010: C
- 2010–2011: D
- 2011–2012: C

== Athletics ==
The school's main rival is Miami Northwestern High School. In 2009 McGrory stated that the football games, especially those against Northwestern, are well-attended, and that the students at Central "take pride in their marching band".

== Notable alumni ==
=== Academic ===
- William Cordova, Class of 1988 – Internationally accomplished Contemporary visual artist, activist, mentor, philanthropist. Attended Miami Dade College (1988–1994), The School of the Art Institute of Chicago, BFA (1996), Yale University, MFA, 2004. Cordova was recipient of the John Simon Guggenheim Memorial Foundation Fellowship (2021).

=== Baseball ===
- Ronnie Belliard, Class of 1994 – former infielder for the Milwaukee Brewers (1998–2002), Colorado Rockies (2003), Cleveland Indians (2004–2006), St. Louis Cardinals (2006) Washington Nationals (2007–2009) and Los Angeles Dodgers (2009–2010)
- George Barber, Class of 2007 - former outfielder for the Los Angeles Angels (2010–2011), Baltimore Orioles (2012–2014), Perth Heat (2013–2014), Traverse City Beach Bums (2014).

=== Basketball ===
- Tracy Reid, Class of 1994 – played in the WNBA; played college basketball at the University of North Carolina

=== Football ===
- Elvis Peacock, Class of 1974 – former running back for the Los Angeles Rams (1979–1980) and the Cincinnati Bengals (1981); played college football at the University of Oklahoma
- Dwight Drane, Class of 1980 – former defensive back for the Buffalo Bills (1986–1991); played college football at the University of Oklahoma
- Bruce Armstrong, Class of 1983 – former offensive tackle for the New England Patriots (1987–2000); played college football at the University of Louisville
- Reggie Brown, Class of 1988 – wide receiver for the Houston Oilers
- Najeh Davenport, Class of 1997 – running back for the Green Bay Packers (2002–2005) and Pittsburgh Steelers (2006–2008)
- Antonio Brown, Class of 1998 – wide receiver for the Buffalo Bills 2003, Washington Redskins (2004–2005); played college at West Virginia
- Willis McGahee, Class of 2000 – running back for the Buffalo Bills (2004–2006), Baltimore Ravens (2007–2010), Denver Broncos (2011–2013), and the Cleveland Browns (2014); played college football at the University of Miami
- Ali Highsmith, Class of 2003 – linebacker/defensive back for the Arizona Cardinals (2008–2009); played college football at Louisiana State University
- Darnell Jenkins, Class of 2003 – wide receiver for the Houston Texans (2008–2009) – played college football at University of Miami
- Bryan Pata, Class of 2003 – defensive lineman who played college football at the University of Miami before being shot to death on November 7, 2006
- Anthony Toribio, Class of 2003 – defensive lineman for the Miami Dolphins (2008), Green Bay Packers (2008–2009) and the Kansas City Chiefs (2010–present); played college football for Carson-Newman University
- Demetrius Byrd, Class of 2005 – wide receiver for the San Diego Chargers (2009); played college football at Louisiana State University
- Travaris Cadet, Class of 2007 – running back for the New Orleans Saints (2012–2014) and New England Patriots (2015); played college football at Appalachian State University
- Rakeem Cato, Class of 2011 – quarterback for the Montreal Alouettes (2015–2016); played college football for the Marshall Thundering Herd
- Durell Eskridge, Class of 2011 – wide receiver for the Arizona Cardinals (2015–2016); played college football at Syracuse
- Devonta Freeman, Class of 2011 – running back for the Atlanta Falcons (2014–2019); played college football at Florida State
- Charles Gaines, Class of 2011 – cornerback for the Cleveland Browns (2015); played college football at Louisville
- Dalvin Cook, Class of 2014 – running back for the Minnesota Vikings (2017–2022), New York Jets (2023), Baltimore Ravens (2023), Dallas Cowboys (2024); played college football at Florida State
- Deatrick Nichols, Class of 2014 – defensive back for the Arizona Cardinals (2018) and Winnipeg Blue Bombers (2021–); played college football at the University of South Florida
- James Cook, Class of 2018 – running back for the Buffalo Bills (2022–); played college football at the University of Georgia
- Tatum Bethune, Class of 2019 – linebacker for the San Francisco 49ers (2024–); played college football at the University of Central Florida and Florida State University
- Wesley Bissainthe, Class of 2022 – linebacker for the Kansas City Chiefs (2026); played college football at the University of Miami
- Rueben Bain Jr., Class of 2023 – linebacker for the Tampa Bay Buccaneers (2026–); played college football at the University of Miami
- Armondo Blount, Class of 2024 – college football defensive end at the University of Miami
- Lawayne McCoy, Class of 2024 – college football wide receiver at the University of Louisville

=== Gymnastics ===
- Kurt Thomas, Class of 1974 – Olympic gymnast; operates the Kurt Thomas Gymnastics Training Center in Frisco, Texas; inducted into the International Gymnastics Hall of Fame in 2003

=== Track and field ===
- Bershawn Jackson, Class of 2002 – ranked #1 in the world in the 400 meter hurdles; bronze medalist at the 2008 Summer Olympics

== See also ==
- Miami-Dade County Public Schools
- Education in the United States
