= Joshisa Trader =

American football player (born 2005)

No. 1 – NC State Wolfpack
- Position: Wide receiver
- Class: Junior

Personal information
- Born: August 2, 2005 (age 21)
- Listed height: 6 ft 1 in (1.85 m)
- Listed weight: 182 lb (83 kg)

Career information
- High school: Chaminade-Madonna (Hollywood, Florida)
- College: Miami (FL) (2024–present)
- Stats at ESPN

Joshisa Trader (born August 2, 2005) is an American college football wide receiver for the NC State Wolfpack.

== Early life ==
Trader grew up playing football and played for a youth team coached by former Miami Hurricanes player Rod Mack, playing alongside Jeremiah Smith. Trader began living with Mack at age 11. He first attended North Miami Beach Senior High School before transferring to Miami Central Senior High School mid-season as a sophomore; he later transferred to Chaminade-Madonna College Preparatory School as a junior.

Trader caught 26 passes for 592 yards and six touchdowns as a sophomore and then played alongside Smith at Chaminade-Madonna, recording 743 receiving yards and seven touchdowns as a junior in 2022. He then scored 14 touchdowns and had 757 receiving yards as a senior. A five-star recruit and a top prospect in the 2024 recruiting class, he committed to play college football for the Miami Hurricanes.

== College career ==
Trader appeared in seven games as a true freshman for the Hurricanes, catching six passes for 91 yards and a touchdown. In the 2024 Pop-Tarts Bowl, he caught three passes for 61 yards and a 40-yard touchdown. Trader would play in 11 games in his sophomore season for Miami, catching 13 passes for 178 yards as the Hurricanes made the 2026 College Football Playoff National Championship.

Ahead of the 2026 college football season, Trader transferred to NC State, where his former high school teammate CJ Bailey plays quarterback.
