= Mark Fletcher Jr. =

American football player (born 2004)

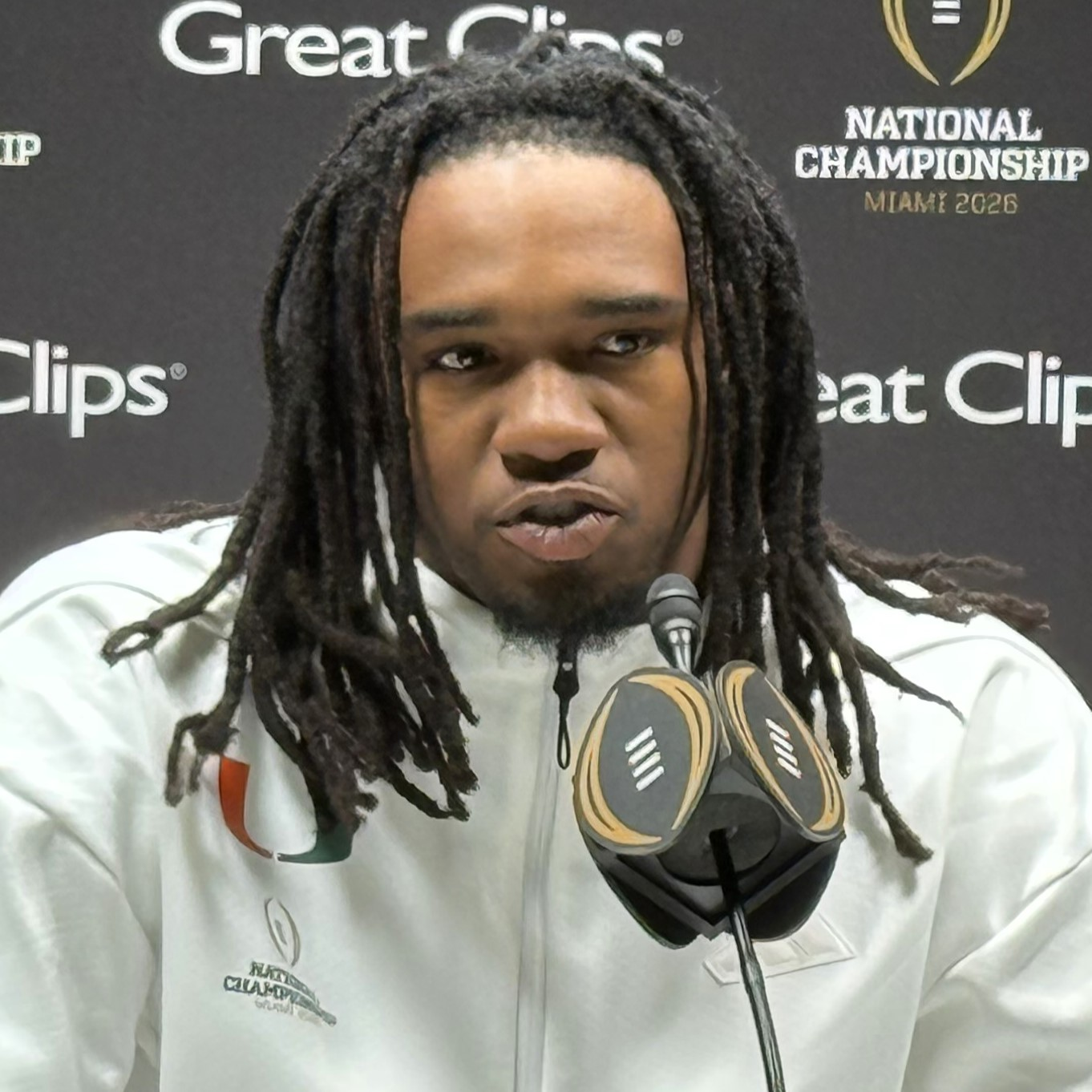

No. 4 – Miami Hurricanes
- Position: Running back
- Class: Senior

Personal information
- Born: October 17, 2004 (age 22)
- Listed height: 6 ft 2 in (1.88 m)
- Listed weight: 225 lb (102 kg)

Career information
- High school: American Heritage (Plantation, Florida)
- College: Miami (FL) (2023–present)

Awards and highlights
- Third-team All-ACC (2025); Cotton Bowl Classic offensive MVP (2025)
- Stats at ESPN

Mark Fletcher Jr. (born October 17, 2004) is an American college football running back for the Miami Hurricanes.

== Early life ==
Fletcher attended American Heritage School in Plantation, Florida. As a senior, he rushed for 1,934 yards and 23 touchdowns. Fletcher originally committed to Ohio State, before decommitting during his senior year. A four-star recruit, he committed to play college football at the University of Miami over an offer from Florida.

== College career ==
Fletcher made his Hurricanes debut in the 2023 season opener against Miami (Ohio), rushing for 76 yards on nine carries and a touchdown in a 38–3 victory. Against Virginia, he scored the game-winning touchdown in overtime in a 29–26 win. Against NC State, he rushed for 115 yards, marking his first 100-yard collegiate game, in a 20–6 loss. He ran for a season-high 126 yards and two touchdowns against Louisville in a 38–31 defeat. In the 2023 Pinstripe Bowl, Fletcher suffered a Lisfranc injury and was carted off the field. He finished his freshman season with 514 rushing yards and five touchdowns in ten games and four starts, missing three games due to other injuries.

Fletcher returned from injury for the 2024 season, playing in all 13 games and making four starts. He made an immediate impact in the season opener against Florida, rushing for two touchdowns in a 41–17 victory. In a 36–14 victory over rival Florida State, Fletcher rushed for 71 yards and a touchdown, delivering a standout performance during the week of his father’s passing. In the season finale against Syracuse, he added two touchdowns and rushed for 46 yards. Fletcher concluded the season in the 2024 Pop-Tarts Bowl against Iowa State, running for 62 yards and a touchdown in a 42–41 loss. He finished the 2024 season with 112 carries for 607 yards, an average of 5.4 yards per carry, and nine touchdowns.

In 2025, Fletcher had back‑to‑back games with two rushing touchdowns in Miami’s victories over Bethune–Cookman and South Florida in Weeks 2 and 3. He recorded a career‑high three rushing touchdowns and 106 yards on 23 carries in a 42–7 win against Stanford. In the first round of the College Football Playoff against Texas A&M, Fletcher rushed for a career‑high 172 yards on 17 carries in a 10–3 victory. In the quarterfinal against Ohio State, he ran for 90 yards on 19 carries and was named the J. Curtis Sanford Offensive Most Valuable Player as the Hurricanes won 24–14. Fletcher continued his strong postseason run in the semifinal against Ole Miss, rushing for 133 yards on 22 carries in a 31–27 win. In the 2026 College Football Playoff National Championship against Indiana, Fletcher rushed for 112 yards and two touchdowns, including a career-long 57-yard score, in a 27–21 defeat. On the field after the game, he threw a punch at Indiana defensive lineman Tyrique Tucker. Fletcher finished the 2025 season having played in 14 games with 12 starts, rushing for an ACC‑leading 1,192 yards on 216 carries with a 5.5 average and 12 touchdowns, and was named third-team All-ACC.

=== Statistics ===
College statistics
Season	Team	Games	Rushing				Receiving			
Season	Team	GP	Att	Yards	Avg	TD	Rec	Yards	Avg	TD
2023	Miami	10	105	514	4.9	5	7	62	8.9	0
2024	Miami	13	112	607	5.4	9	10	106	10.6	0
2025	Miami	14	216	1,192	5.5	12	17	140	8.2	2
2026	Miami	10	115	537	4.7	10	10	111	11.1	1
Career		47	548	2,850	5.2	36	44	419	9.5	3
