= OJ Frederique Jr. =

American football player

No. 29 – Miami Hurricanes
- Position: Cornerback
- Class: Junior

Personal information
- Listed height: 6 ft 0 in (1.83 m)
- Listed weight: 185 lb (84 kg)

Career information
- High school: St. Thomas Aquinas (Fort Lauderdale, Florida)
- College: Miami (2024–present)
- Stats at ESPN

Romanas 'OJ' Frederique Jr. is an American college football cornerback for the Miami Hurricanes.

== Early life ==
Frederique attended St. Thomas Aquinas High School in Fort Lauderdale, Florida. Coming out of high school, he was rated as a three-star recruit and held offers from schools such as Florida State, Miami, Ole Miss, UCF, and West Virginia. Frederique committed to play college football for the West Virginia Mountaineers. However, he flipped his commitment to the Miami Hurricanes.

== College career ==
Frederique got his first career start in week two of the 2024 season, where he recorded two tackles and a pass deflection in a win over Florida A&M. In week nine, he recorded a tackle and a pass deflection in a win over Florida State. In week 11, Frederique tallied five tackles and two pass deflections in a loss to Georgia Tech.
