= Ethan O'Connor (American football) =

American football player

No. 24 – Miami Hurricanes
- Position: Cornerback
- Class: Redshirt Junior

Personal information
- Listed height: 6 ft 1 in (1.85 m)
- Listed weight: 180 lb (82 kg)

Career information
- High school: Los Alamitos (Los Alamitos, California)
- College: Washington State (2023–2024); Miami (FL) (2025–present)
- Stats at ESPN

Ethan O'Connor is an American football cornerback for the Miami Hurricanes. He previously played for the Washington State Cougars.

== Early life ==
O'Connor attended Los Alamitos High School in Los Alamitos, California. Coming out of high school, he was rated as a three-star recruit by 247Sports, and initially committed to play college football for the UCLA Bruins over offers from other schools such as Alabama, Georgia, TCU, Washington, and Washington State. However, O'Connor changed his commitment and signed to play for the Washington State Cougars.

== College career ==
=== Washington State ===
O'Connor was redshirted in 2023. In week 2 of the 2024 season, he recorded his first career interception against Texas Tech. In week 7, O'Connor intercepted a pass which he returned 60 yards for a touchdown in a victory over Fresno State. In the 2024 season, he started in all 12 games, recording 32 tackles, eight pass deflections, four interceptions, and a touchdown. After the conclusion of the season, O'Connor entered the NCAA transfer portal.

=== Miami ===
O'Connor transferred to play for the Miami Hurricanes. He entered the 2025 season as a starter in the Hurricanes secondary.

== Personal life ==
O'Connor is the nephew of former NFL cornerback Jason David.
