= Corey Hetherman =

American football coach

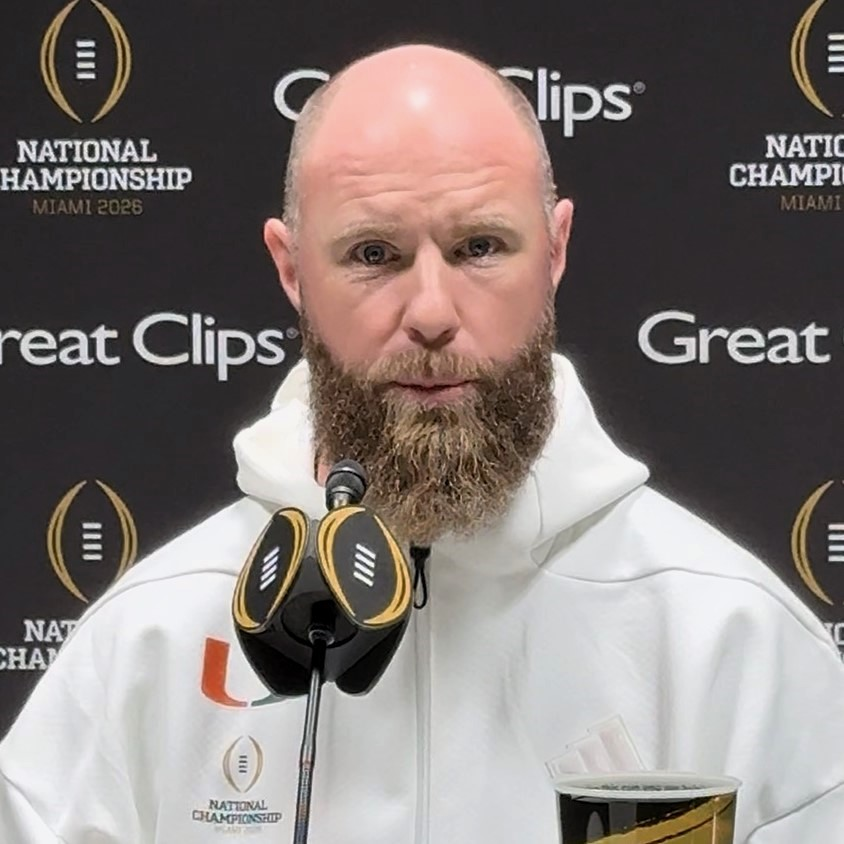
- Hetherman in 2026

Current position
- Title: Defensive coordinator
- Team: Miami (FL)
- Conference: ACC

Biographical details
- Born: Oxford, Massachusetts, U.S.

Playing career
- 2003–2005: Fitchburg State
- Position: Quarterback

Coaching career (HC unless noted)
- 2006: Fitchburg State (QB)
- 2006: Carinthian Black Lions (OC)
- 2006–2007: King's (PA) (intern)
- 2007: Wuerzburg Panthers (OC)
- 2007–2009: Springfield (GA)
- 2010: Northeastern (OLB)
- 2010: Western New England (RC)
- 2011: Old Dominion (OLB)
- 2012–2013: Old Dominion (def. RC/LB)
- 2014: Pace (DC/LB)
- 2015: Maine (DL)
- 2016–2018: Maine (DC)
- 2019–2021: James Madison (DC/DE)
- 2022–2023: Rutgers (LB)
- 2024: Minnesota (DC/LB)
- 2025–present: Miami (FL) (DC/LB)

Accomplishments and honors

Awards
- AFCA Assistant Coach of the Year (2021)

Corey Hetherman is an American college football coach. He is the defensive coordinator for the University of Miami, a position he has held since 2025. He also coached for Fitchburg State, King's (PA), Springfield, Northeastern, Western New England, Old Dominion, Pace, Maine, James Madison, Rutgers and Minnesota. He played college football for Fitchburg State as a quarterback.

== Coaching career ==
Hetherman got his first coaching job at his alma mater Fitchburg State as the team's quarterbacks coach. In 2007, Hetherman joined Springfield as a graduate assistant. In between the 2006 and 2007 seasons, Hetherman also served as the offensive coordinator for the Carinthian Black Lions, an intern for King's (PA), and as the offensive coordinator for the Wuerzburg Panthers. Over the next five years, Hetherman served in various roles with Northeastern, Western New England, and Old Dominion. In 2014, Hetherman was hired to be the defensive coordinator at Pace. After one year at Pace University, Hetherman joined Maine as the team's defensive line coach. After one year as the defensive line coach for Maine, Hetherman was promoted to serve as the team's defensive coordinator.

In 2019, Hetherman was hired as the defensive coordinator at James Madison. During the 2021 season with the Dukes, Hetherman was named the American Football Coaches Association's FCS Assistant Coach of the Year award.

In 2022, Hetherman joined Rutgers as the team's linebackers coach.

In 2024, Hetherman got his first FBS coordinator job as the defensive coordinator and linebackers coach for Minnesota.

In 2025, Hetherman was hired as the defensive coordinator for the Miami Hurricanes, replacing the fired Lance Guidry.
