= Mohamed Toure (American football) =

American football player

No. 1 – Miami Hurricanes
- Position: Linebacker
- Class: Graduate

Personal information
- Listed height: 6 ft 2 in (1.88 m)
- Listed weight: 235 lb (107 kg)

Career information
- High school: Pleasantville (Pleasantville, New Jersey)
- College: Rutgers (2019–2024); Miami (FL) (2025–present)
- Stats at ESPN

Mohamed Toure is an American college football linebacker for the Miami Hurricanes. He previously played for the Rutgers Scarlet Knights.

== Early life ==
Toure attended Pleasantville High School in Pleasantville, New Jersey. As a senior, he played linebacker and running back, recording 69 tackles and five sacks while rushing for 981 yards and 11 touchdowns. A three-star recruit, Toure committed to play college football at Rutgers University–New Brunswick.

== College career ==
After playing sparingly in 2019, Toure's production increased in 2020, highlighted by a season-opening victory over Michigan State in which he recorded two sacks and two forced fumbles. He finished the season with 20 tackles, five tackles for loss, 4.5 sacks, two forced fumbles, and one interception. In 2021, Toure recorded 52 tackles and 4.5 sacks. Prior to the 2022 season, he suffered a torn ACL and missed the entire season. He returned in 2023, serving as a team captain while recording 93 tackles, 9.5 tackles for loss, and 4.5 sacks. Prior to the 2024 season, Toure suffered a second torn ACL and missed the entire season. On April 25, 2025, he announced his decision to enter the transfer portal.

On May 9, 2025, Toure announced his decision to transfer to the University of Miami to play for the Miami Hurricanes. In his first season with Miami, he became a key contributor on defense as the Hurricanes advanced to the 2026 College Football Playoff National Championship. In 2025, Toure started all 16 games and led Miami with 84 tackles while adding two sacks and six pass breakups. Following the 2025 season, he announced his decision to return to Miami for an eighth season of eligibility in 2026.

== Personal life ==
Toure is the cousin of former NFL player Kemoko Turay.
