= Keionte Scott =

American football player (born 2001)

No. 22 – Tampa Bay Buccaneers
- Position: Cornerback
- Roster status: Active

Personal information
- Born: August 11, 2001 (age 25); San Diego, California, U.S.
- Listed height: 5 ft 11 in (1.80 m)
- Listed weight: 193 lb (88 kg)

Career information
- High school: Helix (La Mesa, California)
- College: Snow (2020–2021); Auburn (2022–2024); Miami (FL) (2025)
- NFL draft: 2026: 4th round, 116th overall pick

Career history
- Tampa Bay Buccaneers (2026–present)

Awards and highlights
- Second-team All-ACC (2025); Cotton Bowl Classic defensive MVP (2025)

Career NFL statistics as of Week 8, 2026
- Total tackles: 39
- Sacks: 1
- Pass deflections: 4
- Stats at Pro Football Reference

Keionte Scott (born August 11, 2001) is an American professional football cornerback for the Tampa Bay Buccaneers of the National Football League (NFL). He played college football for the Snow Badgers, Auburn Tigers, and Miami Hurricanes. Scott was selected by the Buccaneers in the fourth round of the 2026 NFL draft.

== Early life ==
Scott is from San Diego, California. He played at Democracy Prep in Las Vegas before he moved to San Diego and attended Helix High School in La Mesa where he played football and competed in track and field. He was a two-way player in football and helped his team win the Southern California open division. He participated at the Makasi Bowl all-star game and was named MVP after scoring three touchdowns. After high school, he began his college football career at Snow College in Utah.

== College career ==
Scott played for the Snow Badgers from 2020 to 2021. In the 2021 season, he appeared in six games and helped them to a record of 7–2, posting 27 tackles and three interceptions. He was Snow's team captain and was twice named a junior college All-American, also being named the conference co-defensive player of the year. Ranked the top junior college cornerback prospect, he transferred to the Auburn Tigers in 2022. Scott became a starter as a defensive back for the Tigers and also served as a return specialist. He posted 54 tackles in the 2022 season and 44 in 2023.

After initially being expected to enter the NCAA transfer portal, he announced a return to Auburn for the 2024 season. Limited by injuries, he only recorded 18 tackles that season. He transferred to the Houston Cougars for his final season in 2025, but then transferred again to the Miami Hurricanes before the season began, becoming Miami's starting nickelback.

== Professional career ==
Pre-draft measurables
Height	Weight	Arm length	Hand span	Wingspan	40-yard dash	10-yard split	20-yard split	Vertical jump	Broad jump
5 ft 11 1/4 in (1.81 m)	193 lb (88 kg)	31 3/8 in (0.80 m)	9 5/8 in (0.24 m)	6 ft 4 5/8 in (1.95 m)	4.37 s	1.53 s	2.39 s	34.0 in (0.86 m)	10 ft 3 in (3.12 m)
All values from NFL Combine/Pro Day

Scott was selected by the Tampa Bay Buccaneers in the fourth round with the 116th overall pick of the 2026 NFL draft.
