= CJ Daniels =

American football player (born 2002)

CJ Daniels Jr.
No. 6 – Los Angeles Rams
- Position: Wide receiver
- Roster status: Active

Personal information
- Born: January 4, 2002 (age 24)
- Listed height: 6 ft 2 in (1.88 m)
- Listed weight: 202 lb (92 kg)

Career information
- High school: Parkview (Lilburn, Georgia)
- College: Liberty (2020–2023); LSU (2024); Miami (FL) (2025)
- NFL draft: 2026: 6th round, 197th overall pick

Career history
- Los Angeles Rams (2026–present)

Awards and highlights
- Second-team All-CUSA (2023)
- Stats at Pro Football Reference

Carlton "CJ" Daniels Jr. (born January 4, 2002) is an American professional football wide receiver for the Los Angeles Rams of the National Football League (NFL). He played college football for the Liberty Flames, the LSU Tigers, and the Miami Hurricanes. Daniels was selected by the Rams in the sixth round of the 2026 NFL draft.

== Early life ==
Daniels attended high school at Parkview located in Lilburn, Georgia. Coming out of high school, he committed to play college football for the Liberty Flames.

== College career ==
=== Liberty ===
During his freshman season in 2020, he hauled in 11 passes for 220 yards and three touchdowns. In the 2021 season, Daniels had a breakout season, recording 37 receptions for 634 yards and seven touchdowns. In the 2023 Conference USA Football Championship Game, he hauled in a career high 157 yards, as he helped Liberty to a conference title victory. Daniels finished the 2023 season, recording 55 receptions for 1,067 yards and ten touchdowns. After the conclusion of the 2023 season, he decided to enter his name into the NCAA transfer portal.

=== LSU ===
Daniels transferred to play for the LSU Tigers. In week nine of the 2024 season, he hauled in two passes for 17 yards before leaving the game with an injury versus Texas A&M. He finished the 2024 season, recording 42 receptions for 480 yards, where after the conclusion of the season he decided to enter his name into the NCAA transfer portal once again.

=== Miami (FL) ===
Granted a sixth year of eligibility, Daniels transferred to play for the Miami Hurricanes. He caught 50 passes for 557 yards and seven touchdowns in helping the Hurricanes to a 13–3 season that ended with a loss in the College Football Playoff National Championship Game.

== Professional career ==
Pre-draft measurables
| Height | Weight | Arm length | Hand span | Wingspan | 40-yard dash | 10-yard split | 20-yard split | 20-yard shuttle | Three-cone drill | Vertical jump | Broad jump |
|---|---|---|---|---|---|---|---|---|---|---|---|
| 6 ft 2 1/4 in (1.89 m) | 202 lb (92 kg) | 31 3/4 in (0.81 m) | 9 1/4 in (0.23 m) | 6 ft 6 3/4 in (2.00 m) | 4.62 s | 1.61 s | 2.71 s | 4.27 s | 7.03 s | 34.5 in (0.88 m) | 10 ft 3 in (3.12 m) |
All values from NFL Combine/Pro Day

On April 25, 2026, Daniels was drafted by the Los Angeles Rams in the sixth round (197th overall) of the 2026 NFL Draft, with the Rams trading with the Philadelphia Eagles to move up 10 slots to select him.
