= Justin Scott (American football) =

American football player (born 2006)

No. 5 – Miami Hurricanes
- Position: Defensive tackle
- Class: Junior

Personal information
- Born: January 31, 2006 (age 20)
- Listed height: 6 ft 4 in (1.93 m)
- Listed weight: 303 lb (137 kg)

Career information
- High school: St. Ignatius College Prep (Chicago, Illinois)
- College: Miami (2024–present)
- Stats at ESPN

Justin Scott (born January 31, 2006) is an American college football defensive tackle for the Miami Hurricanes.

== Early life ==
Scott is from Chicago, Illinois. He grew up playing basketball before being convinced by his coach and a friend at St. Ignatius College Prep to try out football as a freshman in high school. A defensive tackle, he played for the sophomore team in his freshman year. As a sophomore, he appeared in only one game for the varsity team, yet he began receiving many scholarship offers to play college football. He was a starter as a defensive lineman and offensive guard as a junior, posting 42 tackles, 13 tackles-for-loss (TFLs) and 4.5 sacks.

As a senior in 2023, Scott posted 28 tackles, seven TFLs and two sacks while earning selection to the All-American Bowl. He helped St. Ignatius to an appearance in the Class 8A quarterfinals as a senior and was named the Friday Night Drive Defensive Player of the Year as well as all-state. In addition to football, Scott also played basketball in high school. A five-star recruit, he was ranked one of the top 15 prospects nationally in the class of 2024. He initially committed to play college football for the Ohio State Buckeyes in July 2023. He later flipped his commitment to the Miami Hurricanes in November 2023.

== College career ==
Prior to Scott's true freshman season, he was named to Bruce Feldman of The Athletic's "Freaks List", highlighting the most athletic college football players. He was a backup during the 2024 season and finished with seven tackles, two tackles-for-loss and a sack while appearing in 12 games. He saw more playing time as a sophomore, starting several games while posting 19 tackles, 6.5 TFLs and a sack in the regular season.
