= Wesley Bissainthe =

American football player (born 2004)

Profile
- Position: Linebacker

Personal information
- Born: May 23, 2004 (age 22)
- Listed height: 6 ft 1 in (1.85 m)
- Listed weight: 225 lb (102 kg)

Career information
- High school: Miami Central (Miami, Florida)
- College: Miami (FL) (2022–2025)
- NFL draft: 2026: undrafted

Career history
- Kansas City Chiefs (2026)*
- * Offseason or practice squad member only

Awards and highlights
- Third-team All-ACC (2025)
- Stats at Pro Football Reference

Wesley Bissainthe (born May 23, 2004) is an American football linebacker. He played college football for the Miami Hurricanes.

== Early life ==
Bissainthe attended Miami Central Senior High School in Miami-Dade County, Florida. Coming out of high school, he was rated as the 20th overall linebacker by 247Sports, and committed to play college football for the Miami Hurricanes.

== College career ==
As a freshman in 2022, Bissainthe tallied 30 tackles in three starts. In 2023, he totaled 44 tackles with six and a half going for a loss and two sacks. In the 2024 season, Bissainthe started all 13 games, notching 59 tackles with five being for a loss, two sacks, and an interception. In his senior season, he recorded 71 tackles with three going for a loss, a sack, and an interception as he helped the Hurricanes reach the National Championship Game.

== Professional career ==
Pre-draft measurables
Height	Weight	Arm length	Hand span	Wingspan	40-yard dash	10-yard split	20-yard split	20-yard shuttle
6 ft 1 3/4 in (1.87 m)	225 lb (102 kg)	31 7/8 in (0.81 m)	9 3/4 in (0.25 m)	6 ft 5 3/8 in (1.97 m)	4.64 s	1.57 s	2.75 s	4.52 s
All values from NFL Combine/Pro Day

After not being selected in the 2026 NFL draft, Bissainthe signed with the Kansas City Chiefs as an undrafted free agent. On August 30, he was waived by the Chiefs as a part of final roster cuts.
