= Rueben Bain Jr. =

American football player (born 2004)

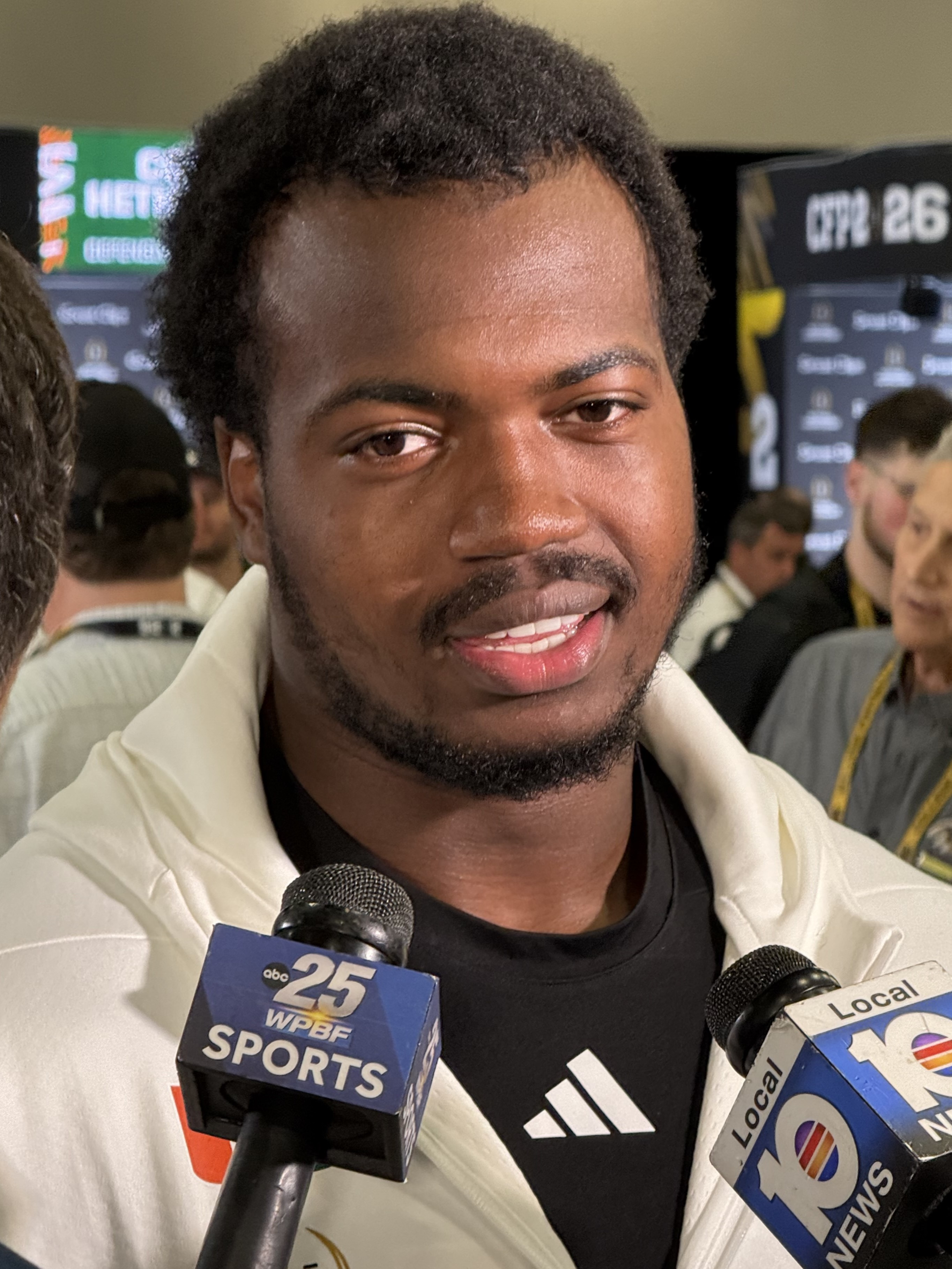
- Bain in 2026

No. 3 – Tampa Bay Buccaneers
- Position: Outside linebacker
- Roster status: Active

Personal information
- Born: September 8, 2004 (age 22); Miami, Florida, U.S.
- Listed height: 6 ft 2 in (1.88 m)
- Listed weight: 263 lb (119 kg)

Career information
- High school: Miami Central
- College: Miami (FL) (2023–2025)
- NFL draft: 2026: 1st round, 15th overall pick

Career history
- Tampa Bay Buccaneers (2026–present)

Awards and highlights
- Ted Hendricks Award (2025); ACC Defensive Rookie of the Year (2023)

Career NFL statistics as of Week 8, 2026
- Tackles: 10
- Sacks: 1.0
- Forced fumbles: 1
- Pass deflections: 1
- Stats at Pro Football Reference

Rueben Ellis Bain Jr. (born September 8, 2004) is an American professional football outside linebacker for the Tampa Bay Buccaneers of the National Football League (NFL). He played college football for the Miami Hurricanes and was selected by the Buccaneers in the first round of the 2026 NFL draft.

== Early life ==
Bain Jr. was born on September 8, 2004, in Miami, Florida. He attended Jupiter Community High School in Jupiter, Florida, later transferring to Miami Central Senior High School in Miami, Florida. During his high school football career he had 77 sacks. He was the Miami Herald 5A-IND Co-Defensive Player of the Year as a junior in 2021 and won the Nat Moore Trophy, given South Florida's best player, his senior year in 2022. He played in the 2023 Under Armour All-America Game. Bain Jr. committed to the University of Miami to play college football.

== College career ==
Bain Jr. earned immediate playing time his true freshman year at Miami in 2023. He became a starter after Akheem Mesidor suffered an injury during the second game of the season. He played in all 13 games and finished with 44 total tackles, 12.5 tackles for loss, 7.5 sacks, and three forced fumbles. He was named ACC Defensive Rookie of the Year and was also selected to the All-ACC Third Team.

In the first game of his sophomore year Bain Jr. suffered a soft-tissue injury on the opening drive and missed the rest of the game and the next four. For the season he had 23 total tackles and 3.5 sacks.

In the first round of the College Football Playoffs Bain Jr. recorded three sacks, four tackles for loss, and a blocked field goal in a 10-3 win over Texas A&M. He played in all 16 games, recording 54 total tackles, 15.5 tackles for loss, 9.5 sacks, and one interception. He was named first-Team All-ACC and won ACC Defensive Player of the Year, becoming the first Hurricane to ever win the award. Bain also won the Ted Hendricks award, becoming the first to win the award in school history.

== Professional career ==
Pre-draft measurables
Height	Weight	Arm length	Hand span	Wingspan
6 ft 2 1/4 in (1.89 m)	263 lb (119 kg)	30 7/8 in (0.78 m)	9 1/8 in (0.23 m)	6 ft 5 1/2 in (1.97 m)
All values from NFL Combine

Bain Jr. was selected in the first round of the 2026 NFL draft with the 15th overall pick by the Tampa Bay Buccaneers. On May 7, 2026 the Buccaneers signed Bain to a four-year, $23.76 million contract with a signing bonus of $13.74 million.

== Personal life ==
On March 17, 2024, Bain Jr. was involved in a car accident in Miami. He was driving four passengers in his car on Interstate 95 at 4 A.M EDT when his vehicle struck another car. One passenger, Destiny Betts, a 22-year old from Georgia visiting Miami on spring break, suffered incapacitating injuries from the crash and was taken to the Ryder Trauma Center at Jackson Memorial Hospital. Betts went into a coma due to injuries suffered in the crash and died on June 13.

== Career statistics ==
=== College ===
Legend
**Bold**	Career high

Year	Team	Games		Tackles					Fumbles				Interceptions			
Year	Team	GP	GS	Cmb	Solo	Ast	TFL	Sck	FF	FR	Yds	TD	Int	Yds	TD	PD
2023	Miami	13	11	44	23	21	12.5	7.5	**3**	0	0	0	0	0	0	**1**
2024	Miami	9	9	23	14	9	5.5	3.5	0	0	0	0	0	0	0	0
2025	Miami	16	16	**54**	**30**	**24**	**15.5**	**9.5**	1	0	0	0	**1**	**12**	0	**1**
Career		38	36	121	67	54	33.5	20.5	4	0	0	0	1	12	0	2
