= Akheem Mesidor =

Canadian gridiron football player (born 2001)

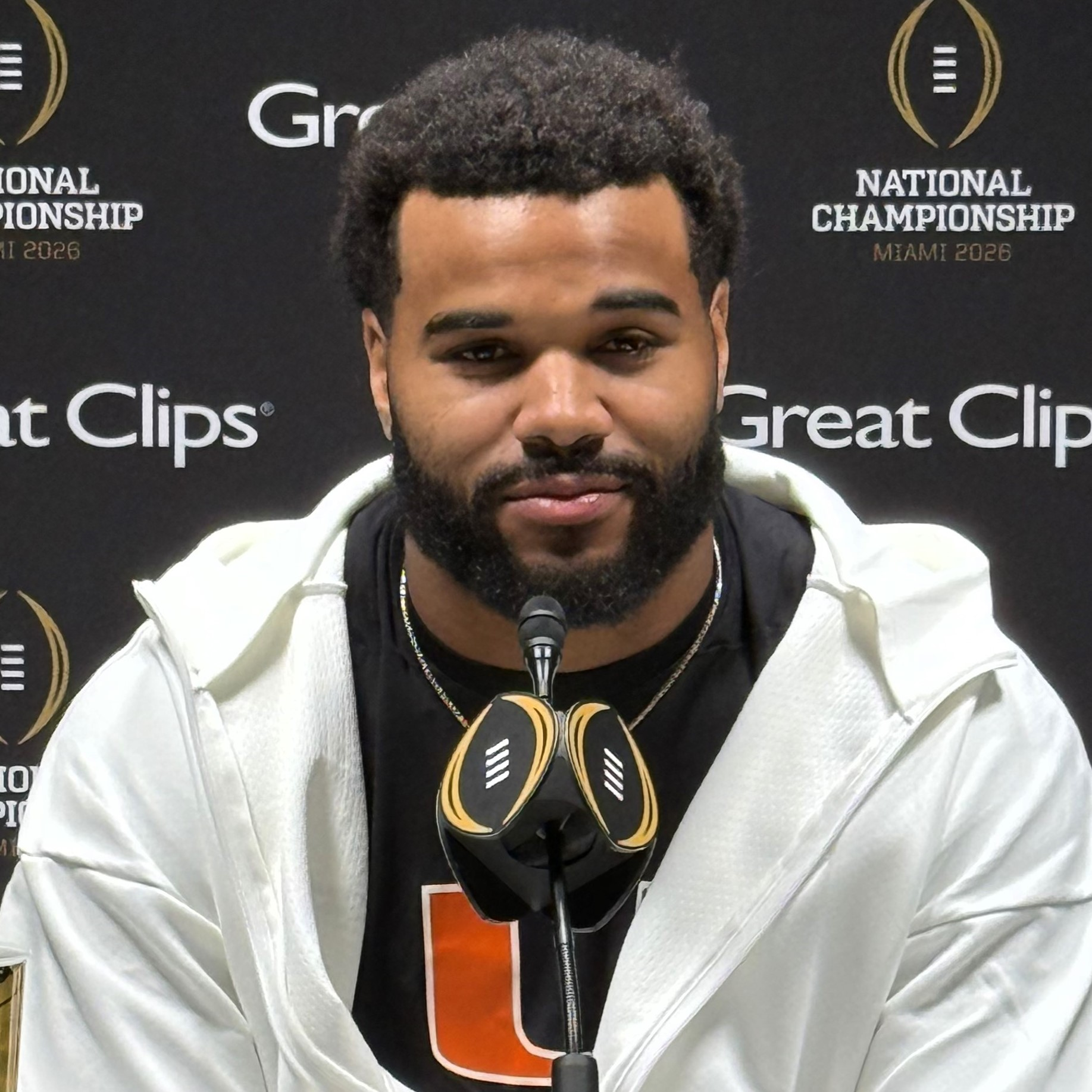
- Mesidor in 2026

No. 90 – Los Angeles Chargers
- Position: Outside linebacker
- Roster status: Active

Personal information
- Born: April 5, 2001 (age 25); Ottawa, Ontario, Canada
- Listed height: 6 ft 3 in (1.91 m)
- Listed weight: 280 lb (127 kg)

Career information
- High school: Clearwater (Clearwater, Florida, U.S.)
- College: West Virginia (2020–2021); Miami (FL) (2022–2025)
- NFL draft: 2026: 1st round, 22nd overall pick

Career history
- Los Angeles Chargers (2026–present)

Awards and highlights
- Second-team All-American (2025); Second-team All-Big 12 (2020); Third-team All-Big 12 (2021)

Career NFL statistics as of Week 5, 2026
- Tackles: 22
- Sacks: 2.5
- Forced fumbles: 1
- Stats at Pro Football Reference

Akheem Nels Mesidor (born April 5, 2001) is a Canadian professional football outside linebacker for the Los Angeles Chargers of the National Football League (NFL). He played college football for the West Virginia Mountaineers and Miami Hurricanes and was selected by the Chargers in the first round of the 2026 NFL draft.

== Early life ==
Mesidor grew up Ottawa, Ontario, and began playing gridiron football with the North Gloucester Giants of the National Capital Amateur Football Association. He attended several high schools in the Ottawa area and Royal Imperial Collegiate of Canada in St. Catharines. Mesidor transferred to Clearwater Academy International in Clearwater, Florida before his senior year. Mesidor was rated a three-star recruit and committed to play college football at West Virginia over offers from UCLA, Georgia Tech, Syracuse, and Pittsburgh.

== College career ==
Mesidor began his college career at West Virginia. He played both defensive end and defensive tackle during his true freshman season and was named second team All-Big 12 Conference after recording 32 tackles, 6.5 tackles for loss, and five sacks. Mesidor moved to nose tackle entering his second season. He finished the season with 38 tackles, eight tackles for loss, and 4.5 sacks. After the season, Mesidor entered the NCAA transfer portal.

Mesidor ultimately transferred to Miami over offers from USC, Auburn, and Tennessee. He was named a starter on the Hurricanes' defensive line despite not participating in the team's spring practices.

== Professional career ==
Pre-draft measurables
Height	Weight	Arm length	Hand span	Wingspan
6 ft 3 in (1.91 m)	259 lb (117 kg)	32 1/8 in (0.82 m)	10 in (0.25 m)	6 ft 6 3/4 in (2.00 m)
All values from NFL Combine

Mesidor was drafted in the first round of the 2026 NFL draft with the 22nd overall pick by the Los Angeles Chargers. Mesidor was ranked the #1 prospect ahead of the 2026 CFL draft on April 28; he ultimately went undrafted in the CFL draft.

== NFL career statistics ==
Year	Team	Games		Tackles					Fumbles				Interceptions			
Year	Team	GP	GS	Cmb	Solo	Ast	Sck	TFL	FF	FR	Yds	TD	Int	Yds	TD	PD
2026	LAC	1	0	2	1	1	0.0	0	0	0	0	—	—	—	—	0
Career		1	0	2	1	1	0.0	0	0	0	0	—	—	—	—	0
