= 2024 California Golden Bears football team =

American college football season

2024 California Golden Bears football

LA Bowl, L 13–24 vs. UNLV
- Conference: Atlantic Coast Conference
- Record: 6–7 (2–6 ACC)
- Head coach: Justin Wilcox (8th season)
- Offensive coordinator: Mike Bloesch (1st season; regular season) responsibilities split among committee for bowl game
- Offensive scheme: Spread
- Defensive coordinator: Peter Sirmon (5th season)
- Base defense: 2–4–5
- Home stadium: California Memorial Stadium

Uniform

2024 Atlantic Coast Conference football standings
| | Conf. | | | Overall |
| Team | W | | L | W | | L |
|---|---|---|---|---|---|---|
| No. 12 SMU y^ | 8 | – | 0 | 11 | – | 3 |
| No. 14 Clemson y$^ | 7 | – | 1 | 10 | – | 4 |
| No. 18 Miami (FL) | 6 | – | 2 | 10 | – | 3 |
| No. 20 Syracuse | 5 | – | 3 | 10 | – | 3 |
| Duke | 5 | – | 3 | 9 | – | 4 |
| Louisville | 5 | – | 3 | 9 | – | 4 |
| Georgia Tech | 5 | – | 3 | 7 | – | 6 |
| Boston College | 4 | – | 4 | 7 | – | 6 |
| Virginia Tech | 4 | – | 4 | 6 | – | 7 |
| Pittsburgh | 3 | – | 5 | 7 | – | 6 |
| NC State | 3 | – | 5 | 6 | – | 7 |
| North Carolina | 3 | – | 5 | 6 | – | 7 |
| Virginia | 3 | – | 5 | 5 | – | 7 |
| California | 2 | – | 6 | 6 | – | 7 |
| Wake Forest | 2 | – | 6 | 4 | – | 8 |
| Stanford | 2 | – | 6 | 3 | – | 9 |
| Florida State | 1 | – | 7 | 2 | – | 10 |
Championship: Clemson 34, SMU 31
^ – College Football Playoff participant; $ – Conference champion; y – Championship game participant; Rankings from AP Poll

The 2024 California Golden Bears football team represented the University of California, Berkeley in the Atlantic Coast Conference (ACC) during the 2024 NCAA Division I FBS football season. The Golden Bears were led by Justin Wilcox in his eighth year as the head coach. The Golden Bears played their home games at California Memorial Stadium located in Berkeley, California.

The 2024 season was California's first in the ACC since moving from the Pac-12 Conference.

On October 5, before playing against the Miami Hurricanes, California hosted their first College GameDay in school history.

== Schedule ==
| Date | Time | Opponent | Site | TV | Result | Attendance |
|---|---|---|---|---|---|---|
| August 31 | 2:00 p.m. | No. 18 (FCS) UC Davis* | California Memorial Stadium; Berkeley, CA | ACCNX/ESPN+ | W 31–13 | 32,275 |
| September 7 | 12:30 p.m. | at Auburn* | Jordan-Hare Stadium; Auburn, AL | ESPN2 | W 21–14 | 88,043 |
| September 14 | 7:30 p.m. | San Diego State* | California Memorial Stadium; Berkeley, CA | ESPN | W 31–10 | 35,197 |
| September 21 | 4:00 p.m. | at Florida State | Doak Campbell Stadium; Tallahassee, FL | ESPN2 | L 9–14 | 55,107 |
| October 5 | 7:30 p.m. | No. 8 Miami (FL) | California Memorial Stadium; Berkeley, CA (College GameDay) | ESPN | L 38–39 | 52,428 |
| October 12 | 12:30 p.m. | at No. 22 Pittsburgh | Acrisure Stadium; Pittsburgh, PA | ESPN | L 15–17 | 49,773 |
| October 19 | 12:30 p.m. | NC State^{†} | California Memorial Stadium; Berkeley, CA | ACCN | L 23–24 | 35,303 |
| October 26 | 1:00 p.m. | Oregon State* | California Memorial Stadium; Berkeley, CA | ESPN2 | W 44–7 | 33,090 |
| November 8 | 5:00 p.m. | at Wake Forest | Allegacy Federal Credit Union Stadium; Winston-Salem, NC | ACCN | W 46–36 | 28,455 |
| November 16 | 12:00 p.m. | Syracuse | California Memorial Stadium; Berkeley, CA | The CW | L 25–33 | 33,493 |
| November 23 | 12:30 p.m. | Stanford | California Memorial Stadium; Berkeley, CA (Big Game) | ACCN | W 24–21 | 52,428 |
| November 30 | 12:30 p.m. | at No. 9 SMU | Gerald J. Ford Stadium; University Park, TX | ESPN2 | L 6–38 | 33,178 |
| December 18 | 6:00 p.m. | vs. No. 24 UNLV* | SoFi Stadium; Inglewood, CA (LA Bowl) | ESPN | L 13–24 | 24,420 |
*Non-conference game; ^{†}Homecoming; Rankings from AP Poll - Released prior to game; All times are in Pacific time; Source:

== Game summaries ==
=== vs. No. 18 (FCS) UC Davis ===
Game One – No. 18 (FCS) UC Davis Aggies (0–0) at California Golden Bears (0–0) – Game summary

| Quarter | 1 | 2 | 3 | 4 | Total |
|---|---|---|---|---|---|
| No. 18 (FCS) Aggies | 6 | 7 | 0 | 0 | 13 |
| Golden Bears | 7 | 7 | 10 | 7 | 31 |

at California Memorial Stadium • Berkeley, California

- Date: Saturday August 31, 2024
- Game time: 2:00 p.m. PST
- Game weather: Temperature: 69 °F (21 °C) • Wind: SW at 9 miles per hour (14 km/h) • Weather: Sunny
- Game attendance: 32,275
- Referee: Justin Elliott
- TV announcers (ACCNX/ESPN+): Roxy Bernstein (play-by-play), Craig Haubert (analyst), and Sherree Burruss (sideline reporter)

Game information

First quarter

- (6:23) CAL – Jaydn Ott 1-yard run, Ryan Coe kick (Drive: 8 plays, 71 yards, 3:23; California 7–0)
- (0:16) UCD – Porter Connors 6-yard fumble recovery (California 7–6)

Second quarter

- (4:42) UCD – Lan Larison 1-yard run, Hunter Ridley kick (Drive: 9 plays, 66 yards, 5:02; UC Davis 13–7)
- (4:31) CAL – Nohl Williams 80-yard kickoff return, Ryan Coe kick (California 14–13)

Third quarter

- (7:18) CAL – Jaydn Ott 6-yard run, Ryan Coe kick (Drive: 10 plays, 55 yards, 3:53; California 21–13)
- (2:14) CAL – Ryan Coe 25-yard field goal (Drive: 10 plays, 52 yards, 4:08; California 24–13)

Fourth quarter

- (14:15) CAL – Nyziah Hunter 3-yard pass from Fernando Mendoza, Ryan Coe kick (Drive: 6 plays, 29 yards, 2:47; California 31–13)

| Statistics | UCD | CAL |
|---|---|---|
| First downs | 20 | 16 |
| Total yards | 304 | 281 |
| Rushing yards | 83 | 102 |
| Passing yards | 221 | 179 |
| Passing: Comp–Att–Int | 24–48–3 | 18–28–0 |
| Time of possession | 30:16 | 29:44 |

| Team | Category | Player | Statistics |
|---|---|---|---|
| UC Davis | Passing | Miles Hastings | 24/48, 221 yards, 3 INT |
| UC Davis | Rushing | Lan Larison | 17 carries, 62 yards, TD |
| UC Davis | Receiving | C. J. Hutton | 7 receptions, 68 yards |
| California | Passing | Fernando Mendoza | 15/22, 158 yards, TD |
| California | Rushing | Jaydn Ott | 14 carries, 49 yards, 2 TD |
| California | Receiving | Nyziah Hunter | 4 receptions, 47 yards, TD |

=== at Auburn ===
California Golden Bears (1–0) at Auburn Tigers (1–0) – Game summary

| Quarter | 1 | 2 | 3 | 4 | Total |
|---|---|---|---|---|---|
| Golden Bears | 7 | 7 | 0 | 7 | 21 |
| Tigers | 7 | 0 | 0 | 7 | 14 |

at Jordan-Hare Stadium • Auburn, Alabama

- Date: September 7th
- Game time: 12:30 p.m. PST
- Game weather: Sunny • Temperature: 85 °F (29 °C) • Wind: NW 4 mph
- Game attendance: 88,043
- Referee: Riley Johnson
- TV announcers (ESPN2): Dave Flemming (play-by-play), Brock Osweiler (analyst), Stormy Buonantony (sideline reporter)

Game information

First quarter

- AUB – KeAndre Lambert-Smith 15-yard pass from Payton Thorne (Towns McGough kick), 11:42. Auburn 7–0. Drive: 8 plays, 75 yards, 3:18.
- CAL – Nyziah Hunter 19-yard pass from Fernando Mendoza (Ryan Coe kick), 7:17. Tied 7–7. Drive: 8 plays, 75 yards, 4:25.

Second quarter

- CAL – Nyziah Hunter 13-yard pass from Fernando Mendoza (Ryan Coe kick), 10:39. California 14–7. Drive: 3 plays, 21 yards, 1:30.

Third quarter

No scoring plays.

Fourth quarter

- CAL – Jaivian Thomas 32-yard run (Ryan Coe kick), 11:27. California 21–7. Drive: 2 plays, 36 yards, 0:49.
- AUB – Payton Thorne 2-yard run (Towns McGough kick), 6:06. California 21–14. Drive: 12 plays, 75 yards, 5:21.

| Statistics | CAL | AUB |
|---|---|---|
| First downs | 18 | 15 |
| Total yards | 70–332 | 57–286 |
| Rushing yards | 34–99 | 30–121 |
| Passing yards | 233 | 165 |
| Passing: Comp–Att–Int | 25–36–0 | 14–27–4 |
| Time of possession | 35:16 | 24:44 |

| Team | Category | Player | Statistics |
|---|---|---|---|
| California | Passing | Fernando Mendoza | 25/36, 233 yds, 2 TD |
| California | Rushing | Jaivian Thomas | 8 rushes, 53 yds, TD |
| California | Receiving | Jonathan Brady | 4 receptions, 63 yds |
| Auburn | Passing | Payton Thorne | 14/27, 165 yds, TD, 4 INT |
| Auburn | Rushing | Jarquez Hunter | 12 rushes, 68 yds |
| Auburn | Receiving | Jarquez Hunter | 3 receptions, 11 yds |

=== vs San Diego State ===
San Diego State Aztecs (1–1) at California Golden Bears (2–0) – Game summary

| Quarter | 1 | 2 | 3 | 4 | Total |
|---|---|---|---|---|---|
| Aztecs | 3 | 0 | 0 | 7 | 10 |
| Golden Bears | 7 | 0 | 14 | 10 | 31 |

at California Memorial Stadium • Berkeley, California

- Date: September 14th
- Game time: 7:30 p.m. PST
- Game weather: Temperature: 60 °F (16 °C) • Wind: SW at 8 miles per hour (13 km/h) • Weather: Sunny
- Game attendance: 35,197
- Referee: Patrick Foy
- TV announcers (ESPN): Dave Flemming (play-by-play), Brock Osweiler (analyst), and Stormy Buonantony (sideline reporter)

Game information

First quarter

- SDSU (5:42) – Nick Lopez 29 yard field goal; 8 plays, 29 yards, 3:40 (San Diego State 3-0)
- CAL (2:25) – Fernando Mendoza 8 yard run; 7 plays, 69 yards, 3:17 (California 7-3)

Second quarter

None

Third quarter

- CAL (9:36) – Kadarius Calloway 7 yard run; 8 plays, 85 yards, 3:55 (California 14-3)
- CAL (1:30) – Corey Dyches 20 yard pass from Fernando Mendoza; 13 plays, 90 yards, 5:37 (California 21-3)

Fourth quarter

- CAL (13:33) – Ryan Coe 48 yard field goal; 5 plays, -5 yards, 1:50 (California 24-3)
- SDSU (11:05) – Jordan Napier 40 yard pass from Javance Tupou'ata-Johnson; 7 plays, 75 yards, 2:28 (California 24-10)
- CAL (9:48) – Nyziah Hunter 15 yard pass from Fernando Mendoza; 3 yards, 75 yards, 1:17 (California 31-10)

| Statistics | SDSU | CAL |
|---|---|---|
| First downs | 16 | 21 |
| Total yards | 65–276 | 71–473 |
| Rushing yards | 35–110 | 42–275 |
| Passing yards | 166 | 198 |
| Passing: Comp–Att–Int | 14–30–2 | 21–29–1 |
| Time of possession | 27:15 | 32:45 |

| Team | Category | Player | Statistics |
|---|---|---|---|
| San Diego State | Passing | Javance Tupou'ata-Johnson | 13/29, 156 yards, 1 TD, 2 INT |
| San Diego State | Rushing | Marquez Cooper | 22 carries, 87 yards |
| San Diego State | Receiving | Jordan Napier | 2 receptions, 53 yards, 1 TD |
| California | Passing | Fernando Mendoza | 21/29, 198 yards, 2 TD, 1 INT |
| California | Rushing | Jaivian Thomas | 17 carries, 169 yards |
| California | Receiving | Nyziah Hunter | 4 receptions, 52 yards, 1 TD |

=== at Florida State ===
Game Four – California Golden Bears (3–0) vs Florida State Seminoles (0–3) – Game summary

| Quarter | 1 | 2 | 3 | 4 | Total |
|---|---|---|---|---|---|
| Golden Bears | 0 | 6 | 3 | 0 | 9 |
| Seminoles | 7 | 0 | 0 | 7 | 14 |

at Doak Campbell Stadium • Tallahassee, FL

- Date: September 21, 2024
- Game time: 4:00 p.m. PST
- Game attendance: 55,107
- Referee: Stuart Mullins
- TV announcers (ESPN2): Roy Philpott (play-by-play), Sam Acho (analyst), and Taylor Davis (sideline reporter)

Game information

First quarter

- (7:47) FSU – Lawrance Toafili 2-yard run (Ryan Fitzgerald kick) (Drive: 8 plays, 60 yards, 2:56; Florida State 7-0)

Second quarter

- (10:10) CAL – Ryan Coe 25-yard field goal (Drive: 6 plays, 68 yards, 2:42; Florida State 7-3)
- (0:00) CAL – Ryan Coe 29-yard field goal (Drive: 5 plays, 51 yards, 0:23; Florida State 7-6)

Third quarter

- (1:30) CAL – Ryan Coe 51-yard field goal (Drive: 8 plays, 42 yards, 2:46; California 9-7)

Fourth quarter

- (11:08) FSU – DJ Uiagalelei 36-yard pass to Ja'Khi Douglas (Ryan Fitzgerald kick) (Drive: 12 plays, 79 yards, 5:16; Florida State 14-9)

| Statistics | CAL | FSU |
|---|---|---|
| First downs | 23 | 17 |
| Total yards | 410 | 284 |
| Rushing yards | 107 | 107 |
| Passing yards | 303 | 177 |
| Passing: Comp–Att–Int | 22-37-1 | 16-27-1 |
| Time of possession | 29:19 | 30:41 |

| Team | Category | Player | Statistics |
|---|---|---|---|
| California | Passing | Fernando Mendoza | 22/36, 303 yards, 1 INT |
| California | Rushing | Jaydn Ott | 16 carries, 73 yards |
| California | Receiving | Mason Starling | 5 receptions, 68 yards |
| Florida State | Passing | DJ Uiagalelei | 16/27, 177 yards, 1 TD, 1 INT |
| Florida State | Rushing | Lawrance Toafili | 17 carries, 80 yards, 1 TD |
| Florida State | Receiving | Ja'Khi Douglas | 4 receptions, 86 yards, 1 TD |

=== vs No. 8 Miami (FL) ===
No. 8 Miami (FL) Hurricanes (5-0) at California Golden Bears (3-1) – Game summary

| Quarter | 1 | 2 | 3 | 4 | Total |
|---|---|---|---|---|---|
| No. 8 Hurricanes | 7 | 3 | 8 | 21 | 39 |
| Golden Bears | 7 | 14 | 14 | 3 | 38 |

at California Memorial Stadium • Berkeley, California

- Date: October 5th
- Game time: 7:30 p.m. PST
- Game weather: Temperature: 82 °F (28 °C) • Wind: N at 4 miles per hour (6.4 km/h) • Weather: Clear
- Game attendance: 52,428
- Referee: Nate Black
- TV announcers (ESPN): Rece Davis (play-by-play), Brock Osweiler (analyst), and Sherree Burruss (sideline reporter)

Game information

First quarter

- (6:19) MIA – Mark Fletcher Jr. 3-yard run, Andres Borregales kick (Drive: 5 plays, 63 yards, 3:01; Miami 7–0)
- (3:58) CAL – Jack Endries 57-yard pass from Fernando Mendoza, Ryan Coe kick (Drive: 7 plays, 89 yards, 2:21; Tied 7–7)

Second quarter

- (13:43) CAL – Jaydn Ott 5-yard run, Ryan Coe kick (Drive: 3 plays, 56 yards, 1:14; California 14–7)
- (9:07) MIA – Andres Borregales 46-yard field goal (Drive: 10 plays, 47 yards, 4:36; California 14–10)
- (8:00) CAL – Jaydn Ott 66-yard pass from Fernando Mendoza, Ryan Coe kick (Drive: 4 plays, 75 yards, 1:07; California 21–10)

Third quarter

- (13:07) CAL – Nohl Williams 40-yard interception return, Ryan Coe kick (California 28–10)
- (8:06) CAL – Chandler Rogers 9-yard run, Ryan Coe kick (Drive: 5 plays, 80 yards, 2:12; California 35–10)
- (3:02) MIA – Damien Martinez 1-yard run, Xavier Restrepo–Cam Ward two-point pass (Drive: 12 plays, 75 yards, 5:04; California 35–18)

Fourth quarter

- (14:13) CAL – Ryan Coe 37-yard field goal (Drive: 8 plays, 55 yards, 3:49; California 38–18)
- (10:28) MIA – Isaiah Horton 18-yard pass from Cam Ward, Andres Borregales kick (Drive: 11 plays, 75 yards, 3:45; California 38–25)
- (4:04) MIA – Cam Ward 24-yard run, Andres Borregales kick (Drive: 9 plays, 70 yards, 2:38; California 38–32)
- (0:26) MIA – Elijah Arroyo 5-yard pass from Cam Ward, Andres Borregales kick (Drive: 6 plays, 92 yards, 1:16; Miami 39–38)

| Statistics | MIA | CAL |
|---|---|---|
| First downs | 29 | 12 |
| Total yards | 86–575 | 49–370 |
| Rushing yards | 33–138 | 25–73 |
| Passing yards | 437 | 297 |
| Passing: Comp–Att–Int | 35–53–1 | 12–24–1 |
| Time of possession | 37:14 | 22:41 |

| Team | Category | Player | Statistics |
|---|---|---|---|
| Miami (FL) | Passing | Cam Ward | 35/53, 437 yards, 2 TD, INT |
| Miami (FL) | Rushing | Mark Fletcher Jr. | 11 carries, 81 yards, TD |
| Miami (FL) | Receiving | Xavier Restrepo | 7 receptions, 163 yards |
| California | Passing | Fernando Mendoza | 11/22, 285 yards, 2 TD, INT |
| California | Rushing | Jonathan Brady | 1 carry, 20 yards |
| California | Receiving | Jack Endries | 3 receptions, 78 yards, TD |

=== at No. 22 Pittsburgh ===
California Golden Bears (3-2) at Pittsburgh Panthers (5-0) – Game summary

| Quarter | 1 | 2 | 3 | 4 | Total |
|---|---|---|---|---|---|
| Golden Bears | 6 | 3 | 0 | 6 | 15 |
| No. 22 Panthers | 7 | 10 | 0 | 0 | 17 |

at Acrisure Stadium • Pittsburgh, Pennsylvania

- Date: October 12th
- Game time: 12:30 p.m. PST
- Game weather: Temperature: 67 °F (19 °C) • Wind: W at 5 miles per hour (8.0 km/h) • Weather: Cloudy
- Game attendance: 49,773
- Referee: Adam Savoie
- TV announcers (ESPN): Dave Flemming (play-by-play), Brock Osweiler (analyst), and Stormy Buonantony (sideline reporter)

Game information

First quarter

- (8:56) CAL – Jaivian Thomas 21-yard run, 2-point pass conversion failed (Drive: 10 plays, 75 yards, 4:50; California 6–0)
- (5:07) PITT – Desmond Reid 5-yard run, Ben Sauls kick (Drive: 11 plays, 75 yards, 3:48; Pittsburgh 7–6)

Second quarter

- (14:58) PITT – Desmond Reid 72-yard run, Ben Sauls kick (Drive: 4 plays, 81 yards, 1:17; Pittsburgh 14–6)
- (10:04) PITT – Ben Sauls 58-yard field goal (Drive: 6 plays, 54 yards, 1:50; Pittsburgh 17–6)
- (5:57) CAL – Ryan Coe 39-yard field goal (Drive: 9 plays, 54 yards, 4:07; Pittsburgh 17–9)

Third quarter

- No scoring plays

Fourth quarter

- (10:30) CAL – Jack Endries 19-yard pass from Fernando Mendoza, 2-point run conversion failed (Drive: 6 plays, 78 yards, 3:04; Pittsburgh 17–15)

| Statistics | CAL | PITT |
|---|---|---|
| First downs | 23 | 14 |
| Total yards | 335 | 277 |
| Rushing yards | 63 | 144 |
| Passing yards | 272 | 133 |
| Passing: Comp–Att–Int | 27–37–0 | 14–28–2 |
| Time of possession | 38:30 | 21:30 |

| Team | Category | Player | Statistics |
|---|---|---|---|
| California | Passing | Fernando Mendoza | 27/37, 272 yards, TD |
| California | Rushing | Jaivian Thomas | 17 carries, 72 yards, TD |
| California | Receiving | Jack Endries | 8 receptions, 119 yards, TD |
| Pittsburgh | Passing | Eli Holstein | 14/28, 133 yards, 2 INT |
| Pittsburgh | Rushing | Desmond Reid | 16 carries, 120 yards, 2 TD |
| Pittsburgh | Receiving | Konata Mumpfield | 3 receptions, 37 yards |

=== vs NC State ===
NC State Wolfpack (3-4) at California Golden Bears (3-3) – Game summary

| Quarter | 1 | 2 | 3 | 4 | Total |
|---|---|---|---|---|---|
| Wolfpack | 3 | 7 | 0 | 14 | 24 |
| Golden Bears | 7 | 6 | 10 | 0 | 23 |

at California Memorial Stadium • Berkeley, California

- Date: October 19th
- Game time: 12:30 p.m. PST
- Game weather: Sunny, 76 °F (24 °C)
- Game attendance: 35,303
- Referee: Jerry Magallanes
- TV announcers (ACCN): Jorge Sedano (play-by-play), Orlando Franklin (analyst), and Morgan Uber (sideline reporter)

Game information

First quarter

Second quarter

Third quarter

Fourth quarter

| Statistics | NCST | CAL |
|---|---|---|
| First downs | 15 | 23 |
| Total yards | 363 | 399 |
| Rushing yards | 29 | 117 |
| Passing yards | 334 | 282 |
| Passing: Comp–Att–Int | 26-37-0 | 30-43-0 |
| Time of possession | 32:37 | 27:23 |

| Team | Category | Player | Statistics |
|---|---|---|---|
| NC State | Passing | CJ Bailey | 25/36, 306 yards, 2 TD |
| NC State | Rushing | Hollywood Smothers | 7 carries, 25 yards |
| NC State | Receiving | Justin Joly | 4 receptions, 95 yards |
| CAL | Passing | Fernando Mendoza | 30/42, 282 yards, 2 TD |
| CAL | Rushing | Jaivian Thomas | 9 carries, 78 yards, 2 TD |
| CAL | Receiving | Jack Endries | 9 receptions, 101 yards |

=== vs Oregon State ===
Oregon State Beavers (4-3) at California Golden Bears (3-4) – Game summary

| Quarter | 1 | 2 | 3 | 4 | Total |
|---|---|---|---|---|---|
| Beavers | 0 | 0 | 0 | 7 | 7 |
| Golden Bears | 14 | 17 | 10 | 3 | 44 |

at California Memorial Stadium • Berkeley, California

- Date: October 26th
- Game time: 1:00 p.m. PST
- Game attendance: 33,090
- TV announcers (ESPN2): Mike Monaco (play-by-play), Kirk Morrison (analyst) and Dawn Davenport (sideline)

Game information

First quarter

Second quarter

Third quarter

Fourth quarter

| Statistics | ORST | CAL |
|---|---|---|
| First downs | 12 | 28 |
| Total yards | 200 | 478 |
| Rushing yards | 60 | 114 |
| Passing yards | 140 | 364 |
| Passing: Comp–Att–Int | 14–28–1 | 27–37–0 |
| Time of possession | 27:39 | 32:21 |

| Team | Category | Player | Statistics |
|---|---|---|---|
| Oregon State | Passing | Ben Gulbranson | 11/20, 131 yards, TD |
| Oregon State | Rushing | Anthony Hankerson | 16 carries, 49 yards |
| Oregon State | Receiving | Trent Walker | 5 receptions, 58 yards, TD |
| California | Passing | Fernando Mendoza | 27/36, 364 yards, 2 TD |
| California | Rushing | Jaivian Thomas | 7 carries, 33 yards, TD |
| California | Receiving | Trond Grizzell | 5 receptions, 95 yards |

=== at Wake Forest ===
California Golden Bears (4-4) at Wake Forest Demon Deacons (4-4) – Game summary

| Quarter | 1 | 2 | 3 | 4 | Total |
|---|---|---|---|---|---|
| Golden Bears | 10 | 19 | 7 | 10 | 46 |
| Demon Deacons | 7 | 7 | 7 | 15 | 36 |

at Allegacy Federal Credit Union Stadium • Winston-Salem, North Carolina

- Date: November 8th
- Game time: 5:00 p.m. PST
- Game attendance: 28,455
- TV announcers (ACCN): Jorge Sedano (play-by-play), Orlando Franklin (analyst) and Morgan Uber (sideline)

Game information

First quarter

Second quarter

Third quarter

Fourth quarter

| Statistics | CAL | WAKE |
|---|---|---|
| First downs | 31 | 26 |
| Total yards | 500 | 386 |
| Rushing yards | 115 | 112 |
| Passing yards | 385 | 274 |
| Passing: Comp–Att–Int | 40–56–1 | 19–36–3 |
| Time of possession | 34:30 | 25:30 |

| Team | Category | Player | Statistics |
|---|---|---|---|
| California | Passing | Fernando Mendoza | 40/56, 385 yards, 2 TD, INT |
| California | Rushing | Fernando Mendoza | 10 carries, 51 yards, TD |
| California | Receiving | Mikey Matthews | 8 receptions, 83 yards, TD |
| Wake Forest | Passing | Hank Bachmeier | 19/36, 274 yards, 2 TD, 3 INT |
| Wake Forest | Rushing | Demond Claiborne | 23 carries, 113 yards, TD |
| Wake Forest | Receiving | Taylor Morin | 9 receptions, 110 yards |

=== vs Syracuse ===
Syracuse Orange (6-3) at California Golden Bears (5-4) – Game summary

| Quarter | 1 | 2 | 3 | 4 | Total |
|---|---|---|---|---|---|
| Orange | 6 | 21 | 3 | 3 | 33 |
| Golden Bears | 0 | 7 | 7 | 11 | 25 |

at California Memorial Stadium • Berkeley, California

- Date: November 16th
- Game time: 12:00 p.m. PST
- Game attendance: 33,493
- TV announcers (The CW): Thom Brennaman (play-by-play), Max Browne (analyst) and Treavor Scales (sideline)

Game information

First quarter

Second quarter

Third quarter

Fourth quarter

| Statistics | SYR | CAL |
|---|---|---|
| First downs | 26 | 19 |
| Total yards | 471 | 391 |
| Rushing yards | 148 | 166 |
| Passing yards | 323 | 225 |
| Passing: Comp–Att–Int | 29-46-0 | 22-34-2 |
| Time of possession | 38:41 | 21:19 |

| Team | Category | Player | Statistics |
|---|---|---|---|
| Syracuse | Passing | Kyle McCord | 29-46 323 Yards 1 TD |
| Syracuse | Rushing | LeQuint Allen | 23 Carries 109 Yards 2 TD |
| Syracuse | Receiving | Oronde Gadsden II | 8 Receptions 109 Yards |
| California | Passing | Fernando Mendoza | 22-34 225 Yards 1 TD 2 INT |
| California | Rushing | Jaivian Thomas | 3 Carries 80 Yards 1 TD |
| California | Receiving | Jonathan Brady | 6 Receptions 54 Yards 1 TD |

=== vs Stanford (Big Game) ===
Stanford Cardinal (3-7) at California Golden Bears (5-5) – Game summary

| Quarter | 1 | 2 | 3 | 4 | Total |
|---|---|---|---|---|---|
| Cardinal | 14 | 0 | 7 | 0 | 21 |
| Golden Bears | 0 | 7 | 3 | 14 | 24 |

at California Memorial Stadium • Berkeley, California

- Date: November 23rd
- Game time: 12:30 p.m. PST
- Game weather: Cloudy • Temperature: 55 °F (13 °C) • Wind: SW at 8 miles per hour (13 km/h)
- Game attendance: 52,428
- Referee: Marcus Reed
- TV announcers (ACCN): Jorge Sedano (play-by-play), Orlando Franklin (analyst) and Morgan Uber (sideline)

Game information

First quarter

- (7:49) STAN – Justin Lamson 1-yard run, Emmet Kenney kick (Drive: 12 plays, 75 yards, 7:11; Stanford 7–0)
- (1:27) STAN – Justin Lamson 2-yard run, Emmet Kenney kick (Drive: 8 plays, 54 yards, 3:55; Stanford 14–0)

Second quarter

- (11:04) CAL – Trond Grizzell 16-yard pass from Fernando Mendoza, Derek Morris kick (Drive: 4 plays, 82 yards, 1:54; Stanford 14–7)

Third quarter

- (6:33) STAN – Emmett Mosley V 2-yard pass from Micah Ford, Emmet Kenney kick (Drive: 11 plays, 52 yards, 7:05; Stanford 21–7)
- (0:47) CAL – Ryan Coe 46-yard field goal (Drive: 12 plays, 54 yards, 4:43; Stanford 21–10)

Fourth quarter

- (10:09) CAL – Jonathan Brady 30-yard pass from Fernando Mendoza (Drive: 11 plays, 71 yards, 3:49; Stanford 21–16)
- (2:40) CAL – Jonathan Brady 22-yard pass from Fernando Mendoza, Jaydn Ott pass (Drive: 11 plays, 98 yards, 5:05; California 24–21)

| Statistics | STAN | CAL |
|---|---|---|
| First downs | 14 | 20 |
| Total yards | 259 | 371 |
| Rushing yards | 118 | 72 |
| Passing yards | 141 | 299 |
| Passing: Comp–Att–Int | 15–29–0 | 25–38–0 |
| Time of possession | 33:01 | 26:59 |

| Team | Category | Player | Statistics |
|---|---|---|---|
| Stanford | Passing | Ashton Daniels | 14/26, 139 yards |
| Stanford | Rushing | Ashton Daniels | 21 carries, 63 yards |
| Stanford | Receiving | Emmett Mosley V | 6 receptions, 63 yards, TD |
| California | Passing | Fernando Mendoza | 25/36, 299 yards, 3 TD |
| California | Rushing | Fernando Mendoza | 11 carries, 35 yards |
| California | Receiving | Trond Grizzell | 4 receptions, 70 yards, TD |

=== at No. 9 SMU ===
Game Twelve – California Golden Bears (6–5) at No. 9 SMU Mustangs (10–1) – Game summary

| Quarter | 1 | 2 | 3 | 4 | Total |
|---|---|---|---|---|---|
| Golden Bears | 0 | 0 | 3 | 3 | 6 |
| No. 9 Mustangs | 14 | 7 | 0 | 17 | 38 |

at Gerald J. Ford Stadium, University Park, Texas

- Date: Saturday November 30, 2024
- Game time: 12:30 PM PST
- Game weather: Sunny, 60 °F (16 °C)
- Game attendance: 33,178
- Referee: Tim Hedgepeth
- TV announcers (ESPN2): Brian Custer (play-by-play), Rod Gilmore (analyst), and Lauren Sisler (sideline)

Game information

First quarter

- SMU – Matther Hibner 11-yard pass from Kevin Jennings (Collin Rogers kick), 8:36. Mustangs 7–0. Drive: 7 plays, 54 yards, 3:19.
- SMU – Brashard Smith 5-yard run (Collin Rogers kick), 4:04. Mustangs 14–0. Drive: 7 plays, 62 yards, 3:07.

Second quarter

- SMU – Derrick McFall 8-yard run (Collin Rogers kick), 13:02. Mustangs 21–0. Drive: 9 plays, 88 yards, 3:21.

Third quarter

- CAL – Ryan Coe 40-yard field goal, 5:30. Mustangs 21–3. Drive: 12 plays, 45 yards, 5:15.

Fourth quarter

- CAL – Ryan Coe 53-yard field goal, 14:54. Mustangs 21–6. Drive: 5 plays, 55 yards, 2:22.
- SMU – Collin Rogers 48-yard field goal, 9:25. Mustangs 24–6. Drive: 9 plays, 44 yards, 5:29.
- SMU – Brashard Smith 23-yard pass from Kevin Jennings (Collin Rogers kick), 8:28. Mustangs 31–6. Drive: 2 plays, 21 yards, 0:46.
- SMU – Key'Shawn Smith 40-yard pass from Preston Stone (Collin Rogers kick), 3:38. Mustangs 38–6. Drive: 6 plays, 62 yards, 3:25.

| Statistics | CAL | SMU |
|---|---|---|
| First downs | 16 | 20 |
| Total yards | 254 | 415 |
| Rushing yards | 95 | 115 |
| Passing yards | 159 | 300 |
| Passing: Comp–Att–Int | 14–26–1 | 24–34–0 |
| Time of possession | 31:17 | 28:43 |

| Team | Category | Player | Statistics |
|---|---|---|---|
| California | Passing | Chandler Rogers | 8/15, 84 yards |
| California | Rushing | Jaydn Ott | 13 carries, 37 yards |
| California | Receiving | Nyziah Hunter | 5 receptions, 85 yards |
| SMU | Passing | Kevin Jennings | 20/30, 225 yards, 2 TD |
| SMU | Rushing | Brashard Smith | 16 carries, 68 yards, TD |
| SMU | Receiving | Brashard Smith | 3 receptions, 66 yards, TD |

=== No. 24 UNLV (LA Bowl) ===
2024 LA Bowl
California Golden Bears (6–6, 2–6) at No. 24 UNLV Rebels (10–3, 6–1)

| Quarter | 1 | 2 | 3 | 4 | Total |
|---|---|---|---|---|---|
| Golden Bears | 10 | 3 | 0 | 0 | 13 |
| No. 24 Rebels | 7 | 7 | 7 | 3 | 24 |

at SoFi Stadium • Inglewood, California

- Date: Wednesday, December 18, 2024
- Game time: 6:00 p.m.
- Game weather: Clear • Temperature: 73 °F (23 °C) • Wind: W at 4 miles per hour (6.4 km/h) (fixed roof)
- Game attendance: 24,420
- Referee: Ted Pitts
- TV announcers (ESPN): Bob Wischusen (play-by-play), Louis Riddick (analyst) and Kris Budden (sideline)

Game information

First quarter

- (7:45) CAL – Derek Morris 43 yard field goal (Drive: 5 plays, 52 yards, 2:13; California 3–0)
- (5:04) UNLV – Kayden McGee 49 yard pass from Hajj-Malik Williams, Caden Chittenden kick (Drive: 9 plays, 75 yards, 2:41; UNLV 7–3)
- (0:19) CAL – Josiah Martin 29 yard run, Derek Morris kick (Drive: 9 plays, 89 yards, 4:45; California 10–7)

Second quarter

- (13:17) UNLV – Jacob De Jesus 9 yard pass from Hajj-Malik Williams, Caden Chittenden kick (Drive: 6 plays, 75 yards, 2:02; UNLV 14–10)
- (1:50) CAL – Ryan Coe 30 yard field goal (Drive: 13 plays, 32 yards, 5:40; UNLV 14–13)

Third quarter

- (2:13) UNLV – Kylin James 23 yard run, Caden Chittenden kick (Drive: 1 plays, 23 yards, 0:06; UNLV 21–13)

Fourth quarter

- (6:01) UNLV – Caden Chittenden 48 yard field goal (Drive: 4 play, -5 yards, 2:08; UNLV 24–13)

Win Probability

Line

Over/Under

| Statistics | CAL | UNLV |
|---|---|---|
| First downs | 21 | 12 |
| Total yards | 348 | 291 |
| Rushing yards | 182 | 143 |
| Passing yards | 166 | 148 |
| Passing: Comp–Att–Int | 19–39–0 | 6–19–0 |
| Time of possession | 35:50 | 24:10 |

| Team | Category | Player | Statistics |
|---|---|---|---|
| California | Passing | C. J. Harris | 13/20, 109 yards |
| California | Rushing | Jaydn Ott | 11 carries, 109 yards |
| California | Receiving | Jack Endries | 7 receptions, 61 yards |
| UNLV | Passing | Hajj-Malik Williams | 5/18, 96 yards, 2 TD |
| UNLV | Rushing | Jai'Den Thomas | 18 carries, 72 yards |
| UNLV | Receiving | Cameron Oliver | 1 reception, 52 yards |

== Roster ==
2024 California Golden Bears football team roster
Players
Coaches
Offense

| Pos. | # | Name | Class |
|---|---|---|---|
| RB | 1 | Jaydn Ott | Jr |
| RB | 2 | Kadarius Calloway | Sr |
| WR | 3 | Kyion Grayes | So |
| RB | 4 | Justin Williams-Thomas | So |
| WR | 5 | Tobias Merriweather | Jr |
| WR | 6 | Jonathan Brady | Jr |
| QB | 7 | Chandler Rogers | Sr |
| WR | 8 | Mikey Matthews | So |
| WR | 9 | Mason Starling | Jr |
| TE | 10 | Corey Dyches | Sr |
| WR | 11 | Mavin Anderson | Jr |
| WR | 13 | Nyziah Hunter | Fr |
| QB | 15 | Fernando Mendoza | So |
| QB | 16 | C. J. Harris | So |
| WR | 17 | Josiah Martin | Fr |
| QB | 18 | EJ Caminong | Fr |
| WR | 19 | Trevor Rogers | Fr |
| QB | 20 | Belay Brummel | Fr |
| RB | 21 | Byron Cardwell | So |
| QB | 23 | Andrew Maushardt | Fr |
| RB | 24 | Jayden Parker | Fr |
| RB | 25 | Jaivian Thomas | So |
| WR | 26 | Isaac Torres | Jr |
| RB | 28 | Jamaal Wiley | Fr |
| WR | 29 | Myles Reber | Fr |
| WR | 30 | Carson Perry-Smith | Fr |
| RB | 33 | Dean-Taylor Chapman | Fr |
| TE | 42 | Nate Rutchena | Jr |
| OL | 52 | Nick Morrow | Fr |
| OL | 54 | Frederick Williams III | Fr |
| OL | 62 | Syris Corley | Fr |
| OL | 63 | Rush Reimer | Sr |
| OL | 64 | Joshua Stovall | So |
| OL | 65 | Dylan Jemtegaard | Jr |
| OL | 66 | Will McDonald | Sr |
| OL | 68 | Trent Ramsey | So |
| OL | 69 | Aiden Newbill | Fr |
| OL | 70 | Sam Bjerke | Fr |
| OL | 71 | Sioape Vatikani | Jr |
| OL | 72 | T. J. Session | Sr |
| OL | 73 | Tyler Knape | Fr |
| OL | 74 | Matthew Wykoff | Jr |
| OL | 76 | Bastian Swinney | Jr |
| OL | 77 | Braden Miller | So |
| OL | 78 | Victor Stoffel | Sr |
| WR | 80 | Jordan King | So |
| TE | 81 | Camden Jones | Fr |
| WR | 82 | Cole Boscia | So |
| WR | 83 | Trond Grizzell | Jr |
| WR | 84 | Jaiven Plummer | So |
| TE | 86 | Jeffrey Johnson | Jr |
| TE | 87 | Jack Endries | So |
| TE | 88 | J. T. Byrne | Jr |
| TE | 89 | Ben Marshall | Fr |

Defense

| Pos. | # | Name | Class |
|---|---|---|---|
| ILB | 0 | Cade Uluave | So |
| DB | 2 | Craig Woodson | Sr |
| DB | 3 | Nohl Williams | Sr |
| DB | 4 | Miles Williams | Sr |
| DB | 5 | Marcus Harris | Sr |
| DB | 6 | Ja'ir Smith | Jr |
| OLB | 7 | David Reese | Sr |
| DB | 8 | Jasiah Wagoner | So |
| DB | 9 | Ryan Yaites | So |
| ILB | 10 | Teddye Buchanan | Sr |
| DB | 11 | Dayday Aupiu | Fr |
| DB | 13 | Collin Gamble | Jr |
| ILB | 15 | Liam Johnson | Sr |
| OLB | 17 | Cheikhsaliou Fall | Jr |
| OLB | 18 | Serigne Tounkara | Fr |
| DB | 20 | Cam Sidney | So |
| DB | 21 | Lu-Magia Hearns III | Sr |
| DB | 22 | Matthew Littlejohn | Sr |
| DB | 23 | Isaiah Crosby | Jr |
| DB | 24 | Marcus Scott II | So |
| DB | 25 | Khamani Hudson | Fr |
| DB | 27 | Brooklyn Cheek | Fr |
| DB | 30 | Mayze Bryant | So |
| ILB | 31 | Hunter Barth | Jr |
| DB | 34 | Tobey Weydemuller | Fr |
| OLB | 36 | Jude McLellan | Fr |
| DB | 37 | Julian Womack | So |
| DB | 38 | Nate Escalada | Fr |
| OLB | 39 | Michael Cooley | Fr |
| ILB | 41 | Luke Ferrelli | Fr |
| OLB | 43 | Ryan McCulloch | So |
| OLB | 44 | Xavier Carlton | Sr |
| ILB | 46 | Aaron Hampton | Fr |
| DL | 47 | Aidan Keanaaina | Jr |
| ILB | 49 | Lucas Vanderlind | So |
| DL | 51 | Curlee Thomas IV | So |
| DL | 52 | Zurich Ashford | Fr |
| ILB | 53 | Eze Osondu | Fr |
| DL | 55 | BJ Canady | Fr |
| DL | 56 | Legend Journey | Fr |
| ILB | 57 | B. J. Jones | Fr |
| OLB | 58 | Elijah Diaz | So |
| OLB | 59 | Murphy Glasgow | Fr |
| DL | 88 | T. J. Bollers | Jr |
| DL | 90 | Jack Olyphant | Fr |
| DL | 91 | Ricky Correia | Sr |
| OLB | 92 | Myles Williams | Jr |
| DL | 93 | R. J. Stephens | Fr |
| DL | 94 | Stanley Saole-McKenzie | Jr |
| DL | 95 | Akili Calhoun | Jr |
| DL | 96 | Derek Wilkins | Jr |
| DL | 97 | Michael-Anthony Okwura | Fr |
| DL | 98 | Nate Burrell | Jr |

Special teams

| Pos. | # | Name | Class |
|---|---|---|---|
| K | 28 | Spencer Brien | Fr |
| P | 37 | Lachlan Wilson | Sr |
| P | 38 | Bobby Engstler | Fr |
| K | 40 | Ryan Coe | Sr |
| LS | 45 | David Bird | So |
| LS | 47 | Jake Arguello | Jr |
| LS | 48 | Ewan Arechaederra | Fr |
| K | 99 | Derek Morris | Fr |

Head coach

- Justin Wilcox

Coordinators/assistant coaches

- Mike Bloesch – Offensive coordinator/offensive lineman
- Peter Sirmon – Defensive coordinator/inside linebackers
- Vic So'oto – Outside linebackers/special teams coordinator
- Terrence Brown – Defensive backs
- Andrew Browning – Defensive linemen
- Sterlin Gilbert – Passing game coordinator/quarterbacks
- Mike Saffell – Tight ends
- Aristotle Thompson – Running backs
- Burl Toler III – Wide receivers/recruiting coordinator
- Tre Watson – Defensive backs
- Brian Johnson – Director, athletic performance

Legend

- (C) Team captain
- (S) Suspended
- (I) Ineligible
- Injured
- Redshirt

Roster
Last update: 11/15/24
