= 2024 Miami Hurricanes football team =

American college football season

2024 Miami Hurricanes football

Florida Cup champion

Pop-Tarts Bowl, L 41–42 vs. Iowa State
- Conference: Atlantic Coast Conference

Ranking
- Coaches: No. 18
- AP: No. 18
- Record: 10–3 (6–2 ACC)
- Head coach: Mario Cristobal (3rd season)
- Offensive coordinator: Shannon Dawson (2nd season)
- Offensive scheme: Spread, air raid
- Defensive coordinator: Lance Guidry (2nd season)
- Co-defensive coordinator: Derek Nicholson (1st season)
- Base defense: 4–2–5
- Captains: Damien Martinez; Xavier Restrepo; Cam Ward
- Home stadium: Hard Rock Stadium

Uniform
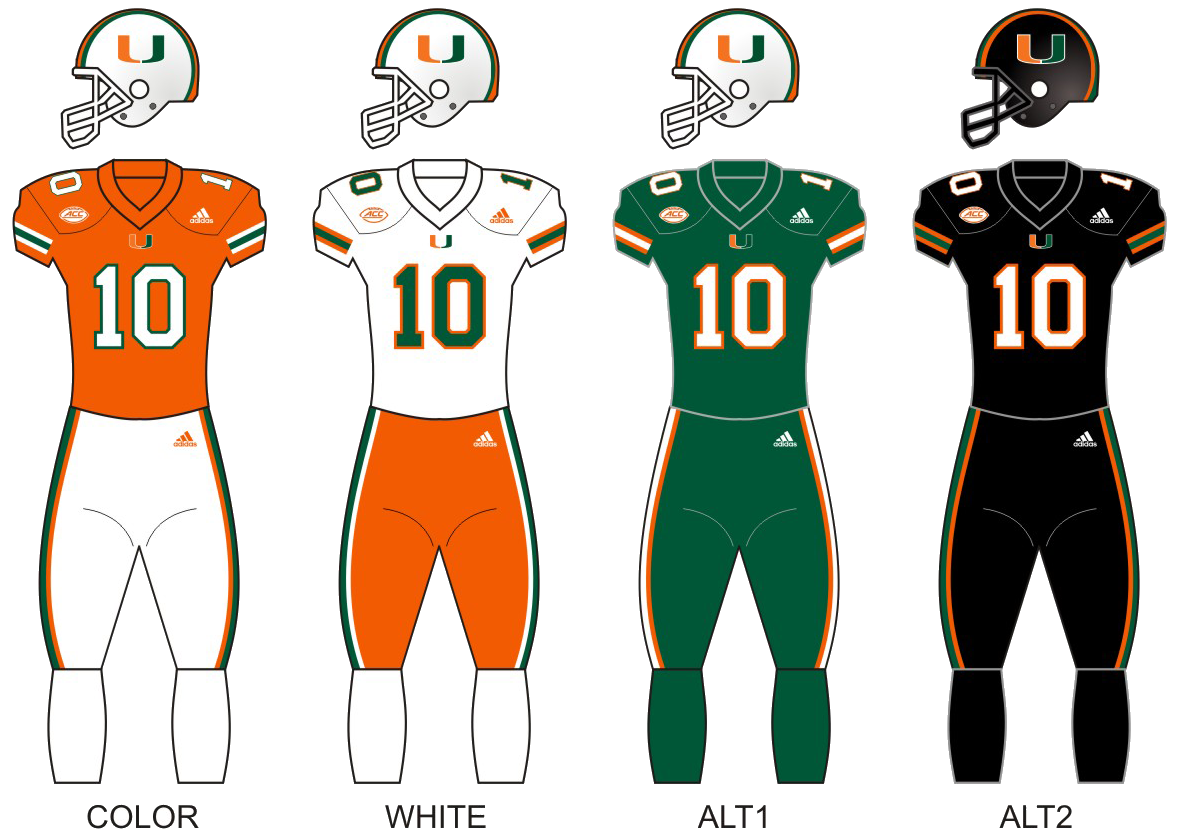

2024 Atlantic Coast Conference football standings
	Conf.			Overall
Team	W		L	W		L
No. 12 SMU y^	8	–	0	11	–	3
No. 14 Clemson y$^	7	–	1	10	–	4
No. 18 Miami (FL)	6	–	2	10	–	3
No. 20 Syracuse	5	–	3	10	–	3
Duke	5	–	3	9	–	4
Louisville	5	–	3	9	–	4
Georgia Tech	5	–	3	7	–	6
Boston College	4	–	4	7	–	6
Virginia Tech	4	–	4	6	–	7
Pittsburgh	3	–	5	7	–	6
NC State	3	–	5	6	–	7
North Carolina	3	–	5	6	–	7
Virginia	3	–	5	5	–	7
California	2	–	6	6	–	7
Wake Forest	2	–	6	4	–	8
Stanford	2	–	6	3	–	9
Florida State	1	–	7	2	–	10
Championship: Clemson 34, SMU 31
^ – College Football Playoff participant; $ – Conference champion; y – Championship game participant; Rankings from AP Poll

The 2024 Miami Hurricanes football team represented the University of Miami in the Atlantic Coast Conference (ACC) during the 2024 NCAA Division I FBS football season. The Hurricanes were led by Mario Cristobal in his third year as head coach. They played their home games at Hard Rock Stadium. They competed in the Pop-Tarts Bowl, losing 42-41 to No. 18 Iowa State.

== Schedule ==
Date	Time	Opponent	Rank	Site	TV	Result	Attendance
August 31	3:30 p.m.	at Florida*	No. 19	Ben Hill Griffin Stadium; Gainesville, FL (rivalry, SEC Nation)	ABC	W 41–17	90,544
September 7	6:00 p.m.	Florida A&M*	No. 12	Hard Rock Stadium; Miami Gardens, FL	ACCNX/ESPN+	W 56–9	57,886
September 14	3:30 p.m.	Ball State*	No. 10	Hard Rock Stadium; Miami Gardens, FL	ACCN	W 62–0	51,564
September 21	7:00 p.m.	at South Florida*	No. 8	Raymond James Stadium; Tampa, FL	ESPN	W 50–15	58,616
September 27	7:30 p.m.	Virginia Tech	No. 7	Hard Rock Stadium; Miami Gardens, FL (rivalry)	ESPN	W 38–34	59,539
October 5	10:30 p.m.	at California	No. 8	California Memorial Stadium; Berkeley, CA (College GameDay)	ESPN	W 39–38	52,428
October 19	12:00 p.m.	at Louisville	No. 6	L&N Federal Credit Union Stadium; Louisville, KY (rivalry)	ABC	W 52–45	59,115
October 26	7:00 p.m.	Florida State	No. 6	Hard Rock Stadium; Miami Gardens, FL (rivalry)	ESPN	W 36–14	66,200
November 2	12:00 p.m.	Duke	No. 5	Hard Rock Stadium; Miami Gardens, FL	ABC	W 53–31	60,189
November 9	12:00 p.m.	at Georgia Tech	No. 4	Bobby Dodd Stadium; Atlanta, GA	ESPN	L 23–28	47,358
November 23	12:00 p.m.	Wake Forest	No. 8	Hard Rock Stadium; Miami Gardens, FL	ESPN	W 42–14	64,210
November 30	3:30 p.m.	at Syracuse	No. 6	JMA Wireless Dome; Syracuse, NY	ESPN	L 38–42	40,486
December 28	3:30 p.m.	vs. No. 18 Iowa State*	No. 13	Camping World Stadium; Orlando, FL (Pop-Tarts Bowl)	ABC	L 41–42	38,650
*Non-conference game; Rankings from AP Poll (and CFP Rankings, after November 5) - Released prior to game; All times are in Eastern time

== Rankings ==
Ranking movements Legend: ██ Increase in ranking ██ Decrease in ranking
	Week																
Poll	Pre	1	2	3	4	5	6	7	8	9	10	11	12	13	14	15	Final
AP	19	12	10	8	7	8	6	6	6	5	4	12	11	8	14	15	18
Coaches	19	15	12	11	9	8	6	5	5	5	4	12	10	7	14	16	18
CFP	Not released										4	9	8	6	12	13	Not released

== Personnel ==
=== Coaching staff ===
Name	Title
Mario Cristobal	Head coach
Shannon Dawson	Offensive coordinator/quarterbacks coach
Lance Guidry	Defensive coordinator
Alex Mirabal	Assistant head coach/offensive line coach
Joe Salave'a	Associate head coach/Run game coordinator/defensive line coach
Kevin Beard	Wide receivers coach
Chevis Jackson	Cornerbacks coach
Matt Merritt	Running backs coach
Derek Nicholson	Co-defensive coordinator/Linebackers coach
Jason Taylor	Defensive Line coach
Cody Woodiel	Tight ends coach

=== Roster ===
2024 Miami Hurricanes football team roster
Players
Coaches
Offense

Pos.	#	Name	Class
WR	0	Joshisa Trader	Fr
QB	1	Cam Ward	Sr
WR	2	Isaiah Horton	So
WR	3	Jacolby George	Sr
RB	4	Mark Fletcher Jr.	So
WR	5	Ray Ray Joseph	So
RB	6	Damien Martinez	Jr
WR	7	Xavier Restrepo	Sr
TE	8	Elijah Arroyo	Jr
TE	9	Elija Lofton	Fr
WR	11	Sam Brown Jr.	Jr
QB	15	Judd Anderson	Fr
QB	16	Reese Poffenbarger	Jr
QB	17	Emory Williams	So
QB	18	João Arede	Jr
QB	18	Riply Luna	Fr
WR	18	Chance Robinson	Fr
QB	18	Nikao Smith	Fr
QB	19	Joe Borchers	Fr
WR	19	Ny Carr	Fr
RB	20	Terrell Walden II	So
RB	21	Jordan Lyle	Fr
RB	24	Chris Johnson Jr.	Fr
RB	25	Chris Wheatley-Humphrey	Fr
RB	28	Ajay Allen	So
WR	33	Nick Thomas	Fr
RB	35	Jack Whitehouse	Fr
WR	40	Brennan Burton	Fr
WR	43	Andrew Cohen	Sr
TE	46	Dylan Reiman	Fr
TE	48	Owen Ruskavich	Fr
C	50	Zach Carpenter	Sr
OL	52	Luis Cristobal Jr.	Sr
OL	55	Nino Francavilla	Fr
OL	57	Matt Antezana	So
OL	61	Francis Mauigoa	So
OL	62	Tommy Kinsler IV	Fr
OL	63	Samson Okunlola	Fr
OL	64	Jalen Rivers	Jr
OL	68	Ian Johnson	So
OL	70	Markell Bell	Jr
OL	71	Antonio Tripp Jr.	Fr
OL	72	Taylor Broutin	Fr
OL	73	Anez Cooper	Jr
OL	74	Yerovi Valdes Alfonso	Fr
OL	75	Frankie Tinilau	Fr
OL	76	Ryan Rodriguez	Jr
OL	77	Juan Minaya	Fr
OL	78	Matthew McCoy	So
OL	79	Deryc Plazz	Fr
WR	83	Shemar Kirk	Jr
TE	84	Cam McCormick	GS
TE	85	Jackson Carver	Fr
WR	86	Kolby Luna	Fr
TE	87	Hunter Carver	Fr
TE	88	Riley Williams	So

Defense

Pos.	#	Name	Class
DB	0	Mishael Powell	Sr
LB	1	Francisco Mauigoa	Sr
DB	2	Daryl Porter Jr.	Sr
DL	3	Akheem Mesidor	Jr
DL	4	Rueben Bain Jr.	So
DL	5	C. J. Clark	Sr
DB	6	Damari Brown	So
DB	7	Jaden Harris	So
DL	8	Josh Horton	Fr
DL	9	Tyler Baron	Sr
DL	10	Simeon Barrow Jr.	Sr
DL	11	Elijah Alston	Sr
DL	12	Marquise Lightfoot	Fr
DB	15	Markeith Williams	So
DB	16	Robert Stafford	Fr
LB	17	Bobby Washington Jr.	Fr
DL	18	Armondo Blount	Fr
DB	19	D'Yoni Hill	Jr
DB	20	Zaquan Patterson	Fr
LB	21	Jaylin Alderman	Jr
LB	22	Cam Pruitt	Fr
DB	23	Dylan Day	Fr
LB	24	Malik Bryant	So
DB	25	Jadais Richard	Jr
DB	27	Ryan Mack	Fr
DB	28	Isaiah Taylor	Jr
DB	28	Robby Washington	Fr
DB	29	OJ Frederique Jr.	Fr
LB	31	Wesley Bissainthe	Jr
LB	32	Raul Aguirre Jr.	So
DL	33	Booker Pickett	Fr
LB	34	Adarius Haynes	Fr
DB	36	Nick Kelly	So
DB	37	Isaiah Thomas	Fr
DB	38	Myles Mooyoung	Jr
LB	39	Casey Rizzi	Fr
LB	41	Chase Smith	Jr
DL	42	Artavius Jones	Fr
DB	43	Tyler Rowe	So
DL	44	Cole McConathy II	Fr
LB	45	Braylon Lamar	Fr
DB	46	Andres Williams	Fr
DB	47	Stone Stroud	Fr
LB	51	Luke D'Alise	Fr
LB	52	Jack McManus	So
DL	53	Joe Enguidanos	Sr
DL	56	Iheukwumere Marcus	Jr
DL	57	Marley Cook	Sr
DL	90	Daylen Russell	Fr
DL	91	Elias Rudolph	Fr
DL	92	Samuel Coufal	Fr
DL	93	Anthony Campbell	Sr
DL	95	Cooper Ricks	Fr
DL	98	Justin Scott	Fr
DL	99	Ahmad Moten Sr.	So

Special teams

Pos.	#	Name	Class
K	30	Andrés Borregales	Sr
K	40	Abram Murray	Fr
LS	49	Mason Napper	Sr
LS	54	Michael Donovan	Jr
LS	74	John Connelly	Fr
P	86	Fred Potter	So
P	94	Dylan Joyce	So
P	96	Tucker Tevepaugh	Fr
K	97	Will Rocha	Fr

Head coach

- Mario Cristobal

Coordinators/assistant coaches

- Alex Mirabal – Assistant Head Coach/Offensive Line
- Shannon Dawson – Offensive Coordinator/Quarterbacks
- Lance Guidry – Defensive Coordinator
- Derek Nicholson – Co-Defensive Coordinator/Linebackers
- Joe Salave'a – Defensive Run Game Coordinator/Defensive Line
- Kevin Beard – Wide Receivers
- Chevis Jackson – Cornerbacks
- Matt Merritt – Running Backs
- Jason Taylor – Defensive ends/Rush coach
- Cody Woodiel – Tight Ends
- Todd Stroud – Senior football advisor
- Mike Rumph – Director of recruiting/On-campus experience
- Eric Renaghan – Executive director of human performance
- Adam Bennett – Head athletic/football trainer
- Victor Ishmael – S&C Support
- Ervin Young – S&C Support
- Andrew Brown – S&C Support
- Aaron Feld – S&C Support

Legend

- (C) Team captain
- (S) Suspended
- (I) Ineligible
- Injured
- Redshirt

Roster
Last update: November 15, 2024

== Game summaries ==
=== at Florida (rivalry) ===
No. 19 Miami Hurricanes (0–0) at Florida Gators (0–0) – Game summary

Quarter	1	2	3	4	Total
No. 19 Hurricanes	7	17	14	3	41
Gators	3	7	0	7	17

at Ben Hill Griffin Stadium • Gainesville, FL

- Date: August 31, 2024
- Game time: 3:30 p.m.
- Game weather: Sunny • Temperature: 92 °F (33 °C) • Wind: NE at 4 miles per hour (6.4 km/h)
- Game attendance: 90,544
- Referee: Marcus Woods
- TV announcers (ABC): Joe Tessitore (play-by-play), Jesse Palmer (analyst), and Katie George (sideline reporter)

Game information

First quarter

- (6:48) MIA – Cam McCormick 9-yard pass from Cam Ward, Andrés Borregales kick (Drive: 11 plays, 84 yards, 5:39; Miami 7–0)
- (0:19) FLA – Trey Smack 41-field goal (Drive: 6 plays, 10 yards, 2:06; Miami 7–3)

Second quarter

- (9:53) MIA – Andrés Borregales 23 yard-field goal (Drive: 9 plays, 70 yards, 5:26; Miami 10–3)
- (6:41) MIA – Mark Fletcher Jr. 10-yard run, Andrés Borregales kick (Drive: 4 plays, 58 yards, 1:23; Miami 17–3)
- (3:21) FLA – Montrell Johnson Jr. 71-yard run, Trey Smack kick (Drive: 1 play, 71 yards, 0:11; Miami 17–10)
- (0:45) MIA – Xavier Restrepo 24-yard pass from Cam Ward, Andrés Borregales kick (Drive: 8 plays, 75 yards, 2:36; Miami 24–10)

Third quarter

- (12:25) MIA – Mark Fletcher Jr. 1-yard run, Andrés Borregales kick (Drive: 6 plays, 75 yards, 2:35; Miami 31–10)
- (6:08) MIA – Jacolby George 23-yard pass from Cam Ward, Andrés Borregales kick (Drive: 9 plays, 86 yards, 3:49; Miami 38–10)

Fourth quarter

- (7:14) FLA – Treyaun Webb 1-yard run, Trey Smack kick (Drive: 9 play, 58 yards, 4:03; Miami 38–17)
- (4:00) MIA – Andrés Borregales 26 yard-field goal (Drive: 6 plays, 37 yards, 3:14; Miami 41–17)

Statistics	MIA	UF
First downs	25	17
Total yards	529	261
Rushing yards	144	139
Passing yards	385	122
Passing: Comp–Att–Int	26–36–1	14–26–2
Time of possession	34:30	25:30

Team	Category	Player	Statistics
Miami (FL)	Passing	Cam Ward	26/36, 385 yards, 3 TD, INT
Miami (FL)	Rushing	Damien Martinez	15 carries, 65 yards
Miami (FL)	Receiving	Xavier Restrepo	7 receptions, 112 yards, TD
Florida	Passing	Graham Mertz	11/20, 91 yards, INT
Florida	Rushing	Montrell Johnson Jr.	11 carries, 106 yards, TD
Florida	Receiving	Eugene Wilson III	7 receptions, 50 yards

=== vs Florida A&M (FCS) ===
Florida A&M Rattlers (FCS) (2–0) vs No. 12 Miami Hurricanes (1–0) – Game summary

Quarter	1	2	3	4	Total
Rattlers (FCS)	3	3	3	0	9
No. 12 Hurricanes	15	10	21	10	56

at Hard Rock Stadium • Miami Gardens, FL

- Date: September 7, 2024
- Game time: 6:00 p.m.
- Game weather: Sunny • Temperature: 90 °F (32 °C) • Wind: NW 11 mph
- Game attendance: 57,886
- Referee: Jon Noli
- TV announcers (ACCNX/ESPN+): Chuckie Kempf (play-by-play), Forrest Conoly (analyst), and Marilyn Payne (sideline reporter)

Game information

First quarter

- (13:40) MIA – Elijah Arroyo 17-yard pass from Cam Ward, Andrés Borregales kick (Drive: 2 plays, 28 yards, 0:33; Miami 7–0)
- (6:40) MIA – Xavier Restrepo 50-yard pass from Cam Ward, Riley Willimas two–point run (Drive: 7 plays, 99 yards, 3:30; Miami 15–0)
- (0:49) FAMU – Cameron Gillis 22-yard field goal (Drive: 9 plays, 70 yards, 5:51; Miami 15–3)

Second quarter

- (12:58) MIA – Chris Johnson Jr. 9-yard pass from Cam Ward, Andrés Borregales kick (Drive: 7 plays, 75 yards, 2:51; Miami 22–3)
- (5:43) MIA – Andrés Borregales 37-yard field goal (Drive: 9 plays, 44 yards, 4:51; Miami 25–3)
- (0:00) FAMU – Cameron Gillis 36-yard field goal (Drive: 10 plays, 67 yards, 2:09; Miami 25–6)

Third quarter

- (12:33) MIA – Mark Fletcher Jr. 4-yard run, Andrés Borregales kick (Drive: 7 plays, 75 yards, 2:27; Miami 32–6)
- (9:14) MIA – Damien Martinez 33-yard run, Andr'es Borregales kick (Drive: 3 plays, 73 yards, 1:11; Miami 39–6)
- (7:29) FAMU – Michael Smith 49-yard field goal (Drive: 5 plays, 43 yards, 1:45; Miami 39–9)
- (3:43) MIA – Cam Ward 8-yard run, Andrés Borregales kick (Drive: 8 plays, 60 yards, 3:34; Miami 46–9)

Fourth quarter

- (14:23) MIA – Jordan Lyle 1-yard run, Andrés Borregales kick (Drive: 6 plays, 43 yards, 3:11; Miami 53–9)
- (2:00) MIA – Abram Murray 38-yard field goal (Drive: 14 plays, 58 yards, 8:05; Miami 56–9)

Statistics	FAMU	MIA
First downs	13	31
Total yards	194	548
Rushing yards	52	224
Passing yards	142	324
Passing: Comp–Att–Int	15–28–3	26–33–0
Time of possession	25:18	34:42

Team	Category	Player	Statistics
Florida A&M	Passing	Daniel Richardson	13/17, 135 yards, INT
Florida A&M	Rushing	Dorian Collier	5 carries, 31 yards
Florida A&M	Receiving	Jamari Gassett	5 receptions, 61 yards
Miami (FL)	Passing	Cameron Ward	20/26, 304 yards, 3 TD
Miami (FL)	Rushing	Damien Martinez	10 carries, 90 yards, TD
Miami (FL)	Receiving	Xavier Restrepo	4 receptions, 104 yards, TD

=== vs Ball State ===
Ball State Cardinals (1–0) vs No. 10 Miami Hurricanes (2–0) – Game summary

Quarter	1	2	3	4	Total
Cardinals	0	0	0	0	0
No. 10 Hurricanes	10	21	10	21	62

at Hard Rock Stadium • Miami Gardens, FL

- Date: September 14, 2024
- Game time: 3:30 p.m.
- Game attendance: 51,564
- TV announcers (ACCN): Chris Cotter (play-by-play), Mark Herzlich (analyst), and Coley Harvey (sideline reporter)

Game information

First quarter

- (6:15) MIA – Andrés Borregales 30-yard field goal (Drive: 11 plays, 71 yards, 5:10; Miami 3–0)
- (1:25) MIA – Xavier Restrepo 21-yard pass from Cam Ward, Andrés Borregales kick (Drive: 5 plays, 60 yards, 2:34; Miami 10–0)

Second quarter

- (4:46) MIA – Chris Johnson Jr. 37-yard pass from Cam Ward, Andrés Borregales kick (Drive: 7 plays, 82 yards, 2:51; Miami 17–0)
- (1:53) MIA – Elijah Arroyo 21-yard pass from Cam Ward, Andrés Borregales kick (Drive: 2 plays, 53 yards, 0:16; Miami 24–0)
- (1:30) MIA – Xavier Restrepo 20-yard pass from Cam Ward, Andrés Borregales kick (Drive: 2 plays, 20 yards, 0:12; Miami 31–0)

Third quarter

- (12:26) MIA – Jacolby George 17-yard pass from Cam Ward, Andrés Borregales kick (Drive: 6 plays, 71 yards, 2:27; Miami 38–0)
- (3:24) MIA – Andrés Borregales 32-yard field goal (Drive: 13 plays, 63 yards, 6:54; Miami 41–0)

Fourth quarter

- (14:49) MIA – Ajay Allen 56-yard run, Abram Murray kick (Drive: 2 plays, 90 yards, 0:23; Miami 48–0)
- (11:46) MIA – Elija Lofton 40-yard pass from Emory Williams, Abram Murray kick (Drive: 3 plays, 57 yards, 1:14; Miami 55–0)
- (6:40) MIA – Jordan Lyle 7-yard run, Abram Murray kick (Drive: 7 plays, 60 yards, 4:10; Miami 62–0)

Statistics	BALL	MIA
First downs	9	31
Total yards	115	750
Rushing yards	6	243
Passing yards	109	507
Passing: Comp–Att–Int	18–32–1	30–40–0
Time of possession	27:01	32:59

Team	Category	Player	Statistics
Ball State	Passing	Kadin Semonza	16/26, 111 yards, INT
Ball State	Rushing	Braedon Sloan	5 carries, 13 yards
Ball State	Receiving	Braedon Sloan	4 receptions, 41 yards
Miami (FL)	Passing	Cam Ward	19/28, 346 yards, 5 TD
Miami (FL)	Rushing	Ajay Allen	7 carries, 104 yards, TD
Miami (FL)	Receiving	Jacolby George	6 receptions, 109 yards, TD

=== at South Florida ===
No. 8 Miami Hurricanes (3–0) at South Florida Bulls (2–1) – Game summary

Quarter	1	2	3	4	Total
No. 8 Hurricanes	14	8	14	14	50
Bulls	9	6	0	0	15

at Raymond James Stadium • Tampa, FL

- Date: September 21, 2024
- Game time: 7:00 p.m.
- Game weather: Sunny • Temperature: 83 °F (28 °C) • Wind: SE at 8 miles per hour (13 km/h)
- Game attendance: 58,616
- Referee: Tim Rich
- TV announcers (ESPN): Bob Wischusen (play-by-play), Louis Riddick (analyst), and Kris Budden (sideline reporter)

Game information

First quarter

- (11:30) MIA – Damien Martinez 2-yard run, Andrés Borregales kick (Drive: 7 plays, 75 yards, 3:29; Miami 7–0)
- (8:28) USF – Nico Gramatica 58-yard field goal (Drive: 8 plays, 35 yards, 3:02; Miami 7–3)
- (6:52) USF – Byrum Brown 12-yard pass from Sean Atkins, extra-point blocked (Drive: 3 plays, 30 yards, 0:44; South Florida 9–7)
- (1:47) MIA – Isaiah Horton 6-yard pass from Cam Ward, Andrés Borregales kick (Drive: 8 plays, 90 yards, 4:59; Miami 14–9)

Second quarter

- (14:14) USF – Nico Gramatica 51-yard field goal (Drive: 7 plays, 42 yards, 2:33; Miami 14–12)
- (2:36) USF – John Cannon 45-yard field goal (Drive: 19 plays, 66 yards, 8:30; South Florida 15–14)
- (1:56) MIA – Samuel Brown 76-yard pass from Cam Ward, Damien Martinez–Cam Ward two-point pass (Drive: 2 plays, 80 yards, 0:37; Miami 22–15)

Third quarter

- (7:25) MIA – Damien Martinez 1-yard run, Andrés Borregales kick (Drive: 12 plays, 80 yards, 5:51; Miami 29–15)
- (0:55) MIA – Damien Martinez 1-yard run, Andrés Borregales kick (Drive: 7 plays, 80 yards, 2:53; Miami 36–15)

Fourth quarter

- (7:44) MIA – Xavier Restrepo 5-yard pass from Cam Ward, Andrés Borregales kick (Drive: 10 plays, 80 yards, 5:36; Miami 43–15)
- (3:09) MIA – Jordan Lyle 91-yard run, Andrés Borregales kick (Drive: 3 plays, 96 yards, 1:39; Miami 50–15)

Statistics	MIA	USF
First downs	27	23
Total yards	592	365
Rushing yards	188	62
Passing yards	404	303
Passing: Comp–Att–Int	24–34–1	26–43–2
Time of possession	31:22	28:38

Team	Category	Player	Statistics
Miami (FL)	Passing	Cam Ward	24/34, 404 yards, 3 TD, INT
Miami (FL)	Rushing	Jordan Lyle	6 carries 104 yards, TD
Miami (FL)	Receiving	Isaiah Horton	8 receptions, 108 yards, TD
South Florida	Passing	Byrum Brown	19/30, 254 yards
South Florida	Rushing	Kelley Joiner	6 carries, 34 yards
South Florida	Receiving	Sean Atkins	11 receptions, 125 yards

=== vs Virginia Tech (rivalry) ===
Virginia Tech Hokies (2–2) vs No. 7 Miami Hurricanes (4–0) – Game summary

Quarter	1	2	3	4	Total
Hokies	7	17	3	7	34
No. 7 Hurricanes	14	3	7	14	38

at Hard Rock Stadium • Miami Gardens, FL

- Date: September 27, 2024
- Game time: 7:30 p.m.
- Game attendance: 59,539
- TV announcers (ESPN): Anish Shroff (play-by-play), Andre Ware (analyst), and Paul Carcaterra (sideline reporter)

Game information

First quarter

- (12:47) VT – Benji Gosnell 25-yard pass from Kyron Drones, John Love kick (Drive: 3 plays, 31 yards, 1:21; Virginia Tech 7–0)
- (10:05) MIA – Jacolby George 18-yard pass from Cam Ward, Andrés Borregales kick (Drive: 5 plays, 73 yards, 2:42; Tied 7–7)
- (8:19) MIA – Elijah Arroyo 43-yard pass from Cam Ward, Andrés Borregales kick (Drive: 3 plays, 52 yards, 0:59; Miami 14–7)

Second quarter

- (11:59) VT – Bhayshul Tuten 55-yard run, John Love kick (Drive: 3 plays, 64 yards, 1:18; Tied 14–14)
- (5:25) VT – Jaylin Lane 20-yard run, John Love kick (Drive: 5 plays, 69 yards, 2:30; Virginia Tech 21–14)
- (0:20) VT – John Love 57-yard field goal (Drive: 9 plays, 34 yards, 2:10; Virginia Tech 24–14)
- (0:00) MIA – Andrés Borregales 56-yard field goal (Drive: 2 plays, 15 yards, 0:20; Virginia Tech 24–17)

Third quarter

- (10:33) VT – John Love 52-yard field goal (Drive: 8 plays, 41 yards, 4:27; Virginia Tech 27–17)
- (2:18) MIA – Cam Ward 17-yard run, Andrés Borregales kick (Drive: 8 plays, 89 yards, 3:32; Virginia Tech 27–24)

Fourth quarter

- (12:05) VT – Ayden Greene 16-yard pass from Kyron Drones, John Love kick (Drive: 10 plays, 45 yards, 5:13; Virginia Tech 34–24)
- (8:40) MIA – Cam McCormick 6-yard pass from Cam Ward, Andrés Borregales kick (Drive: 9 plays, 70 yards, 3:25; Virginia Tech 34–31)
- (1:57) MIA – Isaiah Horton 1-yard pass from Cam Ward, Andrés Borregales kick (Drive: 10 plays, 57 yards, 5:50; Miami 38–34)

Statistics	VT	MIA
First downs	23	24
Total yards	394	508
Rushing yards	206	165
Passing yards	188	343
Passing: Comp–Att–Int	20–34–1	24–38–2
Time of possession	26:18	33:42

Team	Category	Player	Statistics
Virginia Tech	Passing	Kyron Drones	19/33, 189 yards, 2 TD, INT
Virginia Tech	Rushing	Bhayshul Tuten	19 carries, 141 yards, TD
Virginia Tech	Receiving	Stephen Gosnell	4 receptions, 53 yards
Miami (FL)	Passing	Cam Ward	24/38, 343 yards, 4 TD, 2 INT
Miami (FL)	Rushing	Damien Martinez	14 carries, 60 yards
Miami (FL)	Receiving	Elijah Arroyo	2 receptions, 88 yards, TD

=== at California ===
No. 8 Miami Hurricanes (5–0) at California Golden Bears (3–1) – Game summary

Quarter	1	2	3	4	Total
No. 8 Hurricanes	7	3	8	21	39
Golden Bears	7	14	14	3	38

at California Memorial Stadium • Berkeley, CA

- Date: October 5, 2024
- Game time: 10:30 p.m.
- Game weather: Temperature: 82 °F (28 °C) • Wind: N at 4 miles per hour (6.4 km/h) • Weather: Clear
- Game attendance: 52,428
- Referee: Nate Black
- TV announcers (ESPN): Rece Davis (play-by-play), Brock Osweiler (analyst), and Sherree Burruss (sideline reporter)

Game information

First quarter

- (6:19) MIA – Mark Fletcher Jr. 3-yard run, Andrés Borregales kick (Drive: 5 plays, 63 yards, 3:01; Miami 7–0)
- (3:58) CAL – Jack Endries 57-yard pass from Fernando Mendoza, Ryan Coe kick (Drive: 7 plays, 89 yards, 2:21; Tied 7–7)

Second quarter

- (13:43) CAL – Jaydn Ott 5-yard run, Ryan Coe kick (Drive: 3 plays, 56 yards, 1:14; California 14–7)
- (9:07) MIA – Andrés Borregales 46-yard field goal (Drive: 10 plays, 47 yards, 4:36; California 14–10)
- (8:00) CAL – Jaydn Ott 66-yard pass from Fernando Mendoza, Ryan Coe kick (Drive: 4 plays, 75 yards, 1:07; California 21–10)

Third quarter

- (13:07) CAL – Nohl Williams 40-yard interception return, Ryan Coe kick (California 28–10)
- (8:06) CAL – Chandler Rogers 9-yard run, Ryan Coe kick (Drive: 5 plays, 80 yards, 2:12; California 35–10)
- (3:02) MIA – Damien Martinez 1-yard run, Xavier Restrepo–Cam Ward two-point pass (Drive: 12 plays, 75 yards, 5:04; California 35–18)

Fourth quarter

- (14:13) CAL – Ryan Coe 37-yard field goal (Drive: 8 plays, 55 yards, 3:49; California 38–18)
- (10:28) MIA – Isaiah Horton 18-yard pass from Cam Ward, Andrés Borregales kick (Drive: 11 plays, 75 yards, 3:45; California 38–25)
- (4:04) MIA – Cam Ward 24-yard run, Andrés Borregales kick (Drive: 9 plays, 70 yards, 2:38; California 38–32)
- (0:26) MIA – Elijah Arroyo 5-yard pass from Cam Ward, Andrés Borregales kick (Drive: 6 plays, 92 yards, 1:16; Miami 39–38)

Statistics	MIA	CAL
First downs	29	12
Total yards	575	370
Rushing yards	138	73
Passing yards	437	297
Passing: Comp–Att–Int	35–53–1	12–24–1
Time of possession	37:14	22:41

Team	Category	Player	Statistics
Miami (FL)	Passing	Cam Ward	35/53, 437 yards, 2 TD, INT
Miami (FL)	Rushing	Mark Fletcher Jr.	11 carries, 81 yards, TD
Miami (FL)	Receiving	Xavier Restrepo	7 receptions, 163 yards
California	Passing	Fernando Mendoza	11/22, 285 yards, 2 TD, INT
California	Rushing	Jonathan Brady	1 carry, 20 yards
California	Receiving	Jack Endries	3 receptions, 78 yards, TD

=== at Louisville (rivalry) ===
No. 6 Miami Hurricanes (6–0) at Louisville Cardinals (4–2) – Game summary

Quarter	1	2	3	4	Total
No. 6 Hurricanes	10	14	14	14	52
Cardinals	7	10	14	14	45

at L&N Federal Credit Union Stadium • Louisville, KY

- Date: October 19, 2024
- Game time: 12:00 p.m.
- Game attendance: 59,115
- TV announcers (ABC): Joe Tessitore (play-by-play), Jordan Rodgers (analyst), and Stormy Buonantony (sideline reporter)

Game information

First quarter

- (8:34) MIA – Andrés Borregales 55-yard field goal (Drive: 12 plays, 34 yards, 5:10; Miami 3–0)
- (7:15) LOU – Isaac Brown 43-yard run, Brock Travelstead kick (Drive: 3 plays, 68 yards, 1:19; Louisville 7–3)
- (5:05) MIA – Jacolby George 27-yard pass form Cam Ward, Andrés Borregales kick (Drive: 5 plays, 70 yards, 2:10; Miami 10–7)

Second quarter

- (14:49) MIA – Samuel Brown 49-yard pass from Cam Ward, Andrés Borregales kick (Drive: 4 plays, 79 yards, 1:17; Miami 17–7)
- (10:32) LOU – Mark Redman 3-yard pass from Tyler Slough, Brock Travelstead kick (Drive: 9 plays, 75 yards, 4:00; Miami 17–14)
- (5:01) MIA – Raul Aguirre Jr. 3-yard fumble return, Andrés Borregales kick (Miami 24–14)
- (0:00) LOU – Brock Travelstead 22-yard field goal (Drive: 8 plays, 65 yards, 0:57; Miami 24–17)

Third quarter

- (8:21) MIA – Xavier Restrepo 9-yard pass from Cam Ward, Andrés Borregales kick (Drive: 14 plays, 75 yards, 6:39; Miami 31–17)
- (8:06) LOU – Caullin Lacy 100-yard kickoff return, Brock Travelstead kick (Miami 31–24)
- (6:59) LOU – Ja'Corey Brooks 21-yard pass from Tyler Slough, Brock Travelstead kick (Drive: 3 plays, 26 yards, 0:59; Tied 31–31)
- (3:19) MIA – Isaiah Horton 2-yard run pass from Cam Ward, Andrés Borregales kick (Drive: 6 plays, 75 yards, 3:40; Miami 38–31)

Fourth quarter

- (13:32) LOU – Duke Watson 4-yard pass from Tyler Slough, Brock Travelstead kick (Drive: 13 plays, 75 yards, 4:57; Tied 38–38)
- (11:17) MIA – Ajay Allen 2-yard run, Andrés Borregales kick (Drive: 5 plays, 80 yards, 2:05; Miami 45–38)
- (4:05) MIA – Damien Martinez 30-yard run, Andrés Borregales kick (Drive: 11 plays, 80 yards, 6:11; Miami 52–38)
- (0:54) LOU – Ja'Corey Brooks 4-yard pass from Tyler Slough, Brock Travelstead kick (Drive: 13 plays, 77 yards, 3:11; Miami 52–45)

Statistics	MIA	LOU
First downs	27	24
Total yards	538	470
Rushing yards	219	128
Passing yards	319	342
Passing: Comp–Att–Int	21–32–0	31–51–0
Time of possession	34:18	25:42

Team	Category	Player	Statistics
Miami (FL)	Passing	Cam Ward	21/32, 319 yards, 4 TD
Miami (FL)	Rushing	Damien Martinez	12 carries, 89 yards, TD
Miami (FL)	Receiving	Samuel Brown	3 receptions, 125 yards, TD
Louisville	Passing	Tyler Shough	31/51, 342 yards, 4 TD
Louisville	Rushing	Isaac Brown	9 carries, 56 yards, TD
Louisville	Receiving	Ja'Corey Brooks	6 receptions, 107 yards, 2 TD

=== vs Florida State (rivalry) ===
Game Eight – Florida State Seminoles (1–6) vs No. 6 Miami Hurricanes (7–0) – Game summary

Quarter	1	2	3	4	Total
Seminoles	0	7	0	7	14
No. 6 Hurricanes	7	10	6	13	36

at Hard Rock Stadium • Miami Gardens, FL

- Date: Saturday October 26, 2024
- Game time: 7:00 p.m.
- Game attendance: 66,200
- Referee: Jerry Magallanes
- TV announcers (ESPN): Dave Pasch (play-by-play), Dusty Dvoracek (analyst), and Taylor McGregor (sideline reporter)

Game information

First quarter

- (12:22) MIA – Mark Fletcher Jr. 1-yard run, Andrés Borregales kick (Drive: 7 plays, 67 yards, 2:29; Miami 7–0)

Second quarter

- (14:09) MIA – Damien Martinez 18-yard run, Andrés Borregales kick (Drive: 13 plays, 95 yards, 5:00; Miami 14–0)
- (6:44) FSU – Caziah Holmes 1-yard run, Ryan Fitzgerald kick (Drive: 12 plays, 78 yards, 7:15; Miami 14–7)
- (0:00) MIA – Andrés Borregales 20-yard field goal (Drive: 18 plays, 88 yards, 6:35; Miami 17–7)

Third quarter

- (5:59) MIA – Andrés Borregales 42-yard field goal (Drive: 11 plays, 30 yards, 5:04; Miami 20–7)
- (0:39) MIA – Andrés Borregales 45-yard field goal (Drive: 7 plays, 31 yards, 2:37; Miami 23–7)

Fourth quarter

- (4:32) MIA – Cam Ward 7-yard pass from Elijah Arroyo, Two-point conversion failed (Drive: 11 plays, 55 yards, 7:12; Miami 29–7)
- (1:51) MIA – Damien Martinez 12-yard run, Andrés Borregales kick (Drive: 5 plays, 83 yards, 1:59; Miami 36–7)
- (0:18) FSU – Malik Benson 5-yard pass from Brock Glenn, Ryan Fitzgerald kick (Drive: 12 plays, 75 yards, 1:33; Miami 36–14)

Statistics	FSU	MIA
First downs	14	31
Total yards	248	445
Rushing yards	133	230
Passing yards	115	215
Passing: Comp–Att–Int	11–32–0	23–36–0
Time of possession	24:37	35:23

Team	Category	Player	Statistics
Florida State	Passing	Luke Kromenhoek	6/14, 61 yards
Florida State	Rushing	Luke Kromenhoek	11 carries, 71 yards
Florida State	Receiving	Jakhi Douglas	1 reception, 29 yards
Miami (FL)	Passing	Cam Ward	22/35, 208 yards
Miami (FL)	Rushing	Damien Martinez	15 carries, 148 yards, 2 TD
Miami (FL)	Receiving	Isaiah Horton	6 receptions, 65 yards

=== vs Duke ===
Duke Blue Devils (6–2) vs No. 5 Miami Hurricanes (8–0) – Game summary

Quarter	1	2	3	4	Total
Blue Devils	7	14	7	3	31
No. 5 Hurricanes	14	3	15	21	53

at Hard Rock Stadium • Miami Gardens, FL

- Date: November 2, 2024
- Game time: 12:00 p.m.
- Game weather: Cloudy • Temperature: 76 °F (24 °C) • Wind: N 5 miles per hour (8.0 km/h)
- Game attendance: 60,189
- Referee: Tim Hedgepath
- TV announcers (ABC): Joe Tessitore (play-by-play), Jesse Palmer (analyst), and Katie George (sideline reporter)

Game information

First quarter

- (11:54) MIA – Xavier Restrepo 34-yard pass from Cam Ward, Andrés Borregales kick (Drive: 8 plays, 77 yards, 3:06; Miami 7–0)
- (5:04) MIA – Cam McCormick 4-yard pass from Cam Ward, Andrés Borregales kick (Drive: 8 plays, 45 yards, 3:27; Miami 14–0)
- (2:28) DUKE – Peyton Jones 8-yard run, Todd Pelino kick (Drive: 4 plays, 83 yards, 0:55; Miami 14–7)

Second quarter

- (11:15) DUKE – Sahmir Hagans 27-yard pass from Maalik Murphy, Todd Pelino kick (Drive: 8 plays, 77 yards, 4:31; Tied 14–14)
- (4:51) MIA – Andrés Borregales 29-yard field goal (Drive: 12 plays, 67 yards, 6:24; Miami 17–14)
- (1:47) DUKE – Peyton Jones 7-yard pass from Maalik Murphy, Todd Pelino kick (Drive: 7 plays, 75 yards, 3:04; Duke 21–17)

Third quarter

- (10:03) DUKE – Jordan Moore 6-yard pass from Maalik Murphy, Todd Pelino kick (Drive: 10 plays, 75 yards, 4:57; Duke 28–17)
- (7:16) MIA – Xavier Restrepo 3-yard pass from Cam Ward, Cam Ward two-point run (Drive: 7 plays, 69 yards, 2:47; Duke 28–25)
- (3:08) MIA – Elija Lofton 2-yard run, Andrés Borregales kick (Drive: 7 plays, 38 yards, 3:16; Miami 32–28)

Fourth quarter

- (13:51) DUKE – Todd Pelino 37-yard field goal (Drive: 10 plays, 68 yards, 4:17; Miami 32–31)
- (12:56) MIA – Jacolby George 49-yard pass from Cam Ward, Andrés Borregales kick (Drive: 2 plays, 51 yards, 0:55; Miami 39–31)
- (7:36) MIA – Xavier Restrepo 66-yard pass from Cam Ward, Andrés Borregales kick (Drive: 2 plays, 68 yards, 0:45; Miami 46–31)
- (5:37) MIA – Mark Fletcher Jr. 1-yard run, Andrés Borregales kick (Drive: 3 plays, 30 yards, 1:29; Miami 53–31)

Statistics	DUKE	MIA
First downs	23	26
Total yards	405	526
Rushing yards	80	126
Passing yards	325	400
Passing: Comp–Att–Int	25–41–3	25–41–1
Time of possession	28:08	31:52

Team	Category	Player	Statistics
Duke	Passing	Maalik Murphy	25/41, 325 yards, 3 TD, 3 INT
Duke	Rushing	Peyton Jones	12 carries, 71 yards, TD
Duke	Receiving	Sahmir Hagans	9 receptions, 139 yards, TD
Miami (FL)	Passing	Cam Ward	25/41, 400 yards, 5 TD, INT
Miami (FL)	Rushing	Damien Martinez	11 carries, 86 yards
Miami (FL)	Receiving	Xavier Restrepo	8 receptions, 146 yards, 3 TD

=== at Georgia Tech ===
Game Ten – No. 4 Miami Hurricanes (9–0) vs Georgia Tech Yellow Jackets (5–4) – Game summary

Quarter	1	2	3	4	Total
No. 4 Hurricanes	10	0	6	7	23
Yellow Jackets	7	7	7	7	28

at Bobby Dodd Stadium, Atlanta, Georgia

- Date: Saturday November 9, 2024
- Game time: 12:00 p.m.
- Game weather: Sunny
- Game attendance: 47,358
- Referee: Mike Roche
- TV announcers (ESPN): Bob Wischusen (play-by-play), Louis Riddick (analyst), and Kris Budden (sideline reporter)

Game information

First quarter

- (12:49) GT – Jamal Haynes 16-yard run, Aidan Birr kick (Drive: 4 plays, 85 yards, 2:06; Georgia Tech 7–0)
- (11:59) MIA – Elijah Arroyo 74-yard pass from Cam Ward, Andrés Borregales kick (Drive: 2 plays, 75 yards, 0:50; Tied 7–7)
- (7:47) MIA – Andrés Borregales 41-yard field goal (Drive: 8 plays, 44 yards, 2:35; Miami 10–7)

Second quarter

- (12:02) GT – Malik Rutherford 5-yard pass from Haynes King, Aidan Birr kick (Drive: 17 plays, 75 yards, 10:45; Georgia Tech 14–10)

Third quarter

- (6:46) GT – Chase Lane 15-yard pass from Aaron Philo, Aidan Birr kick (Drive: 8 plays, 61 yards, 4:27; Georgia Tech 21–10)
- (2:43) MIA – Isaiah Horton 8-yard pass from Cam Ward, two-point conversion failed (Drive: 9 plays, 83 yards, 3:58; Georgia Tech 21–16)

Fourth quarter

- (13:09) GT – Haynes King 5-yard run, Aidan Birr kick (Drive: 9 plays, 75 yards, 4:34; Georgia Tech 28–16)
- (6:07) MIA – Xavier Restrepo 38-yard pass from Cam Ward, Andrés Borregales kick (Drive: 7 plays, 78 yards, 2:17; Georgia Tech 28–23)

Statistics	MIA	GT
First downs	23	18
Total yards	436	370
Rushing yards	88	271
Passing yards	348	99
Passing: Comp–Att–Int	25–39–0	11–16–0
Time of possession	25:11	34:49

Team	Category	Player	Statistics
Miami (FL)	Passing	Cam Ward	25/39, 348 yards, 3 TD
Miami (FL)	Rushing	Damien Martinez	15 carries, 81 yards
Miami (FL)	Receiving	Jacolby George	7 receptions, 88 yards
Georgia Tech	Passing	Aaron Philo	5/10, 67 yards, TD
Georgia Tech	Rushing	Haynes King	20 carries, 93 yards, TD
Georgia Tech	Receiving	Malik Rutherford	4 receptions, 28 yards, TD

=== vs Wake Forest ===
Wake Forest Demon Deacons (4–6) vs No. 8 Miami Hurricanes (9–1) – Game summary

Quarter	1	2	3	4	Total
Demon Deacons	7	7	0	0	14
No. 8 Hurricanes	10	10	0	22	42

at Hard Rock Stadium • Miami Gardens, FL

- Date: November 23, 2024
- Game time: 12:00 p.m.
- Game weather: Sunny • Temperature: 66 °F (19 °C) • Wind: N 13 miles per hour (21 km/h)
- Game attendance: 64,210
- Referee: Nate Black
- TV announcers (ESPN): Mark Jones (play-by-play), Roddy Jones (analyst), and Quint Kessenich (sideline reporter)

Game information

First quarter

- (8:32) MIA – Jacolby George 13-yard pass from Cam Ward, Andrés Borregales kick (Drive: 13 plays, 84 yards, 6:22; Miami 7–0)
- (5:31) WAKE – Micah Mays Jr. 36-yard pass from Hank Bachmeier, Matthew Dennis kick (Drive: 7 plays, 75 yards, 3:01; Tied 7–7)
- (1:52) MIA – Andrés Borregales 40-yard field goal (Drive: 8 plays, 53 yards, 3:39; Miami 10–7)

Second quarter

- (7:50) MIA – Mishael Powell 76-yard interception return, Andrés Borregales kick (Miami 17–7)
- (7:35) WAKE – Demond Claiborne 100-yard kick return, Matthew Dennis kick (Miami 17–14)
- (0:04) MIA – Andrés Borregales 25-yard field goal (Drive: 11 plays, 71 yards, 1:42; Miami 20–14)

Third quarter

- No scoring plays.

Fourth quarter

- (7:58) MIA – Cam Ward 1-yard run, Elijah Arroyo-Cam Ward two-point pass (Drive: 5 plays, 43 yards, 2:37; Miami 28–14)
- (6:24) MIA – Jordan Lyle 18-yard run, Andrés Borregales kick (Drive: 3 plays, 10 yards, 1:27; Miami 35–14)
- (1:53) MIA – Jacolby George 15-yard pass from Cam Ward, Andrés Borregales kick (Drive: 4 plays, 85 yards, 2:12; Miami 42–14)

Statistics	WAKE	MIA
First downs	12	27
Total yards	193	508
Rushing yards	94	228
Passing yards	99	280
Passing: Comp–Att–Int	9–17–1	27–38–1
Time of possession	29:40	30:20

Team	Category	Player	Statistics
Wake Forest	Passing	Hank Bachmeier	8/14, 86 yards, TD, INT
Wake Forest	Rushing	Demond Claiborne	19 carries, 62 yards
Wake Forest	Receiving	Micah Mays Jr.	1 reception, 36 yards, TD
Miami (FL)	Passing	Cam Ward	27/38, 280 yards, 2 TD, INT
Miami (FL)	Rushing	Jordan Lyle	7 carries, 115 yards, TD
Miami (FL)	Receiving	Jacolby George	7 receptions, 91 yards, 2 TD

=== at Syracuse ===
No. 6 Miami Hurricanes (10–1) at Syracuse Orange (8–3) – Game summary

Quarter	1	2	3	4	Total
No. 6 Hurricanes	14	7	7	10	38
Orange	0	14	21	7	42

at JMA Wireless Dome • Syracuse, NY

- Date: November 30, 2024
- Game time: 3:30 p.m.
- Game weather: None (played indoors)
- Game attendance: 40,486
- Referee: Adam Savoie
- TV announcers (ESPN): Mike Monaco (play-by-play), Kirk Morrison (analyst), and Dawn Davenport (sideline reporter)

Game information

First quarter

- (10:46) MIA – Mark Fletcher Jr. 2-yard run, Andrés Borregales kick (Drive: 10 plays, 75 yards, 4:14; Miami 7–0)
- (3:43) MIA – Xavier Restrepo 16-yard pass from Cam Ward, Andrés Borregales kick (Drive: 7 plays, 63 yards, 3:04; Miami 14–0)

Second quarter

- (12:57) MIA – Elijah Arroyo 3-yard pass from Cam Ward, Andrés Borregales kick (Drive: 8 plays, 93 yards, 3:38; Miami 21–0)
- (10:54) SYR – LeQuint Allen 8-yard run, Jackson Kennedy kick (Drive: 7 plays, 75 yards, 2:03; Miami 21–7)
- (3:41) SYR – Jackson Meeks 9-yard pass from Kyle McCord, Jackson Kennedy kick (Drive: 16 plays, 67 yards, 5:44; Miami 21–14)

Third quarter

- (14:21) SYR – Trebor Pena 9-yard pass from Kyle McCord, Jackson Kennedy kick (Drive: 3 plays, 75 yards, 0:39; Tied 21–21)
- (11:02) MIA – Mark Fletcher Jr. 2-yard run, Andrés Borregales kick (Drive: 8 plays, 75 yards, 3:19; Miami 28–21)
- (7:47) SYR – Jackson Meeks 9-yard pass from Kyle McCord, Jackson Kennedy kick (Drive: 7 plays, 75 yards, 3:15; Tied 28–28)
- (1:47) SYR – Devin Grant 56-yard fumble return, Jackson Kennedy kick (Syracuse 35–28)

Fourth quarter

- (13:02) MIA – Damien Martinez 2-yard run, Andrés Borregales kick (Drive: 9 plays, 75 yards, 3:45; Tied 35–35)
- (9:16) SYR – LeQuint Allen 3-yard run, Jackson Kennedy kick (Drive: 10 plays, 75 yards, 3:46; Syracuse 42–35)
- (3:42) MIA – Andrés Borregales 27-yard field goal (Drive: 14 plays, 65 yards, 5:34; Syracuse 42–38)

Statistics	MIA	SYR
First downs	25	16
Total yards	503	479
Rushing yards	154	99
Passing yards	349	380
Passing: Comp–Att–Int	25–36–0	26–36–0
Time of possession	31:10	28:50

Team	Category	Player	Statistics
Miami (FL)	Passing	Cam Ward	25/36, 349 yards, 2 TD
Miami (FL)	Rushing	Damien Martinez	10 carries, 84 yards, TD
Miami (FL)	Receiving	Xavier Restrepo	9 receptions, 148 yards, TD
Syracuse	Passing	Kyle McCord	26/36, 380 yards, 3 TD
Syracuse	Rushing	LeQuint Allen	22 carries, 82 yards, 2 TD
Syracuse	Receiving	Trebor Pena	6 receptions, 128 yards, TD

=== vs No. 18 Iowa State (Pop-Tarts Bowl) ===
2024 Pop-Tarts Bowl
No. 18 Iowa State Cyclones (10-3) vs No. 13 Miami Hurricanes (10-2)

Quarter	1	2	3	4	Total
No. 18 Cyclones	21	7	7	7	42
No. 13 Hurricanes	14	17	7	3	41

at Camping World Stadium • Orlando, Florida

- Date: Saturday, December 28, 2024
- Game time: 3:30 p.m. EST
- Game weather: Cloudy • Temperature: 75 °F (24 °C) • Wind: 14 mph (23 km/h) southeast
- Game attendance: 38,650
- Referee: Jeff Heaser
- TV announcers (ABC): Tom Hart (play-by-play), Jordan Rodgers (analyst), and Cole Cubelic (sideline) (ABC)/Mike Couzens (play-by-play) and Max Starks (analyst) (ESPN Radio)
- Box score

Game information

First Quarter

- (11:23) ISU – Gabe Burkle 9 yard pass from Rocco Becht, Kyle Konrardy kick (Drive: 7 plays, 22 yards, 3:30; Iowa State 7–0)
- (11:10) MIA – Damien Martinez 75 yard run, Andrés Borregales kick (Drive: 1 plays, 75 yards, 0:13; Tied 7–7)
- (8:34) ISU – Carson Hansen 30 yard run, Kyle Konrardy kick (Drive: 6 plays, 75 yards, 2:36; Iowa State 14–7)
- (4:12) MIA – Jacolby George 4 yard pass from Cam Ward, Andrés Borregales kick (Drive: 7 plays, 75 yards, 4:22; Tied 14–14)
- (2:23) ISU – Carson Hansen 1 yard run, Kyle Konrardy kick (Drive: 6 plays, 65 yards, 1:49; Iowa State 21–14)

Second Quarter

- (13:30) MIA – Joshisa Trader 40 yard pass from Cam Ward, Andrés Borregales kick (Drive: 9 plays, 75 yards, 3:50; Tied 21–21)
- (10:43) ISU – Carson Hansen 13 yard pass from Rocco Becht, Kyle Konrardy kick (Drive: 7 plays, 75 yards, 2:50; Iowa State 28–21)
- (9:25) MIA – Elijah Arroyo 33 yard pass from Cam Ward, Andrés Borregales kick (Drive: 3 plays, 72 yards, 1:18; Tied 28–28)
- (0:16) MIA – Andrés Borregales 30 yard field goal (Drive: 12 plays, 55 yards, 3:30; Miami (FL) 31–28)

Third Quarter

- (8:09) MIA – Mark Fletcher Jr. 1 yard run, Andrés Borregales kick (Drive: 10 plays, 71 yards, 6:01; Miami (FL) 38–28)
- (2:20) ISU – Jaylin Noel 4 yard pass from Rocco Becht, Kyle Konrardy kick (Drive: 10 plays, 75 yards, 5:49; Miami (FL) 38–35)

Fourth Quarter

- (9:40) MIA – Andrés Borregales 21 yard field goal (Drive: 14 plays, 72 yards, 7:40; Miami (FL) 41–35)
- (0:56) ISU – Rocco Becht 1 yard run, Kyle Konrardy kick (Drive: 15 plays, 84 yards, 5:38; Iowa State 42–41)

Statistics	ISU	MIA
First downs	24	24
Total yards	415	524
Rushing yards	145	308
Passing yards	270	216
Passing: Comp–Att–Int	22–36–0	17–33–1
Time of possession	27:41	32:19

Team	Category	Player	Statistics
Iowa State	Passing	Rocco Becht	22/36, 270 yards, 3 TD
Iowa State	Rushing	Carson Hansen	16 carries, 82 yards, 2 TD
Iowa State	Receiving	Jaylin Noel	8 receptions, 117 yards, TD
Miami (FL)	Passing	Cam Ward	12/19, 190 yards, 3 TD
Miami (FL)	Rushing	Damien Martinez	14 carries, 179 yards, TD
Miami (FL)	Receiving	Elijah Arroyo	4 receptions, 64 yards, TD
