= Derek Nicholson =

American football player and coach (born 1986)

Current position
- Title: Linebackers coach
- Team: Missouri
- Conference: SEC

Biographical details
- Born: November 30, 1986 (age 39); Winston-Salem, North Carolina, U.S.
- Education: Florida State (2008); University of Akron (2014); Louisville (2015)

Playing career
- 2005–2008: Florida State
- 2009: Atlanta Falcons
- 2010*: Seattle Seahawks
- Position: Linebacker

Coaching career (HC unless noted)
- 2011: Oak Ridge Military Academy (NC) (DC)
- 2012: Maclay (FL) (DC)
- 2013: Akron (LB)
- 2014: Louisville (OLB/DE)
- 2015: Alcorn State (DL)
- 2016–2017: Southern Miss (DL)
- 2018–2019: Southern Miss (co-DC/LB)
- 2020–2022: Louisville (ILB)
- 2023: Miami (FL) (LB)
- 2024: Miami (FL) (co-DC/LB)
- 2025–present: Missouri (LB)

Derek Nicholson (born November 30, 1986) is the inside linebackers coach at Missouri and an American former football linebacker. He played college football at Florida State and previously coached at Southern Miss and Louisville.

== College career ==
A two-year starter at middle linebacker for the Seminoles, Nicholson led Florida State in tackles during his junior and senior season. In 2008 Nicholson was named to the Butkus Award and Chuck Bednarik Award Watch Lists. Nicholson finished his college career with 207 tackles, 25.5 tackles for loss, 3.0 sacks, and two defensive touchdowns.

== Professional career ==
After not being selected in the 2009 NFL draft, Nicholson was signed by the Atlanta Falcons and participated in their mini-camp.

== Coaching career ==
Nicholson began his coaching career in the high school football ranks in North Carolina and Florida before moving onto the college coaching ranks. Nicholson spent 4 seasons at Southern Miss before returning to coach at Louisville, where he had coached in 2014.

Nicholson would follow Scott Satterfield to Cincinnati after the 2022 season. However, in February 2023 Nicholson would be named the linebacker coach at Miami (FL) after Charlie Strong vacated the position.

== Personal life ==
Nicholson attended Mount Tabor High School in Winston-Salem, North Carolina. Nicholson's older brother A. J. Nicholson played for the Cincinnati Bengals and his father Darrell Nicholson played for the New York Giants.
