= Micah Mays Jr. =

American football player (born 2005)

No. 5 – Florida Gators
- Position: Wide receiver
- Class: Redshirt Junior

Personal information
- Born: February 6, 2005 (age 21)
- Listed height: 6 ft 2 in (1.88 m)
- Listed weight: 195 lb (88 kg)

Career information
- High school: The Benjamin School (Palm Beach County, Florida)
- College: Wake Forest (2023–2025); Florida (2026–present)
- Stats at ESPN

Micah Mays Jr. (born February 6, 2005) is an American football wide receiver for the Florida Gators. He previously played for the Wake Forest Demon Deacons.

== Early life ==
Mays Jr. attended The Benjamin School in Palm Beach County, Florida, where he starred at both football and track and field, earning Palm Beach 2A-1A boys track and field athlete of the year as a junior. He committed to play college football for the Wake Forest Demon Deacons over offers from Clemson and NC State.

== College career ==
=== Wake Forest ===
In week 13 of the 2024 season, Mays Jr. hauled in a 36-yard touchdown reception versus Miami. In three seasons at Wake Forest from 2023 to 2025, he totaled 34 receptions for 520 yards and four touchdowns in 26 games. After the 2025 season, Mays Jr. entered the NCAA transfer portal.

=== Florida ===
Mays Jr. transferred to play for the Florida Gators. In the 2026 spring game, he hauled in four passes for 122 yards and two touchdowns.
