= Mount Tabor High School =

American public secondary school in North Carolina

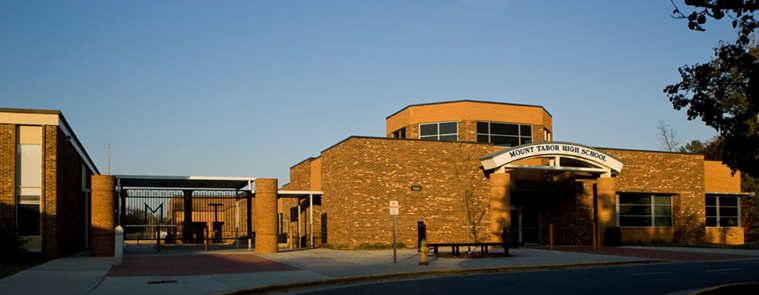
- Mount Tabor High School, January 2011

Location
- 342 Petree Road; Winston-Salem, North Carolina 27106; United States; 36°07′36″N 80°18′48″W

Information
- School type: Public secondary school
- Motto: Sursum et Porro (Latin: Upwards and Forwards)
- Founded: 1966 (60 years ago)
- School district: Winston-Salem/Forsyth County Schools
- Superintendent: Dr. Don Phipps
- CEEB code: 344439
- Principal: Matt Dixon
- Staff: 78.79 (FTE)
- Grades: 9–12
- Enrollment: 1,393 (2023–2024)
- Student to teacher ratio: 17.68
- Colors: Navy and Athletic Gold
- Nickname: Spartans
- Newspaper: The Dorian Scroll
- Website: wsfcs.k12.nc.us/mths

Mount Tabor High School is a high school located in Winston-Salem, North Carolina. It is part of the WS/FCS School System.

== History ==
Mount Tabor High School opened to grades 7 though 11 at the beginning of the 1966–1967 school year. The following school year in 1967–1968, 12th grade was added. In 1971, the school district reorganized schools and changed Mount Tabor to a junior high school. In 1984, it was changed back to a high school for grades 9 through 12.

In 2004, a new building containing an auditorium, guidance and administration offices, and several classrooms and science labs, was built.

On September 1, 2021, one student was fatally shot at the high school; after a manhunt, police apprehended the suspect the same day.

== School demographics ==
During the 2010–2011 school year, there were 1,622 students enrolled at Mount Tabor. The racial makeup of the students was 48.8% White, 36.94% Black, 6.66% Hispanic, 4.5% Multiracial, 2.92% Asian/Pacific Islander, and 0.18% American Indian. 23% of students were eligible for free or reduced lunch.

== Athletics ==
Mount Tabor is a member of the North Carolina High School Athletic Association (NCHSAA) and are currently classified as a 6A school. The school is a part of the Piedmont Triad 5A/6A Conference. Mount Tabor's school colors are navy and gold, and its team name is the Spartans.

=== State Championships ===
Mount Tabor has won the following NCHSAA team state championships:

- Men's Basketball: 2009 (4A)
- Men's Cross Country: 1988 (4A), 1989 (4A), 2015 (4A), 2017 (3A), 2021 (4A)
- Women's Cross Country: 2001 (4A), 2002 (4A)
- Football: 2020–21 (3AA)
- Men's Soccer: 2002 (4A)
- Men's Indoor Track & Field: 2001 (All Classes), 2002 (All Classes), 2023 (4A)
- Women's Indoor Track & Field: 2001 (All Classes), 2002 (All Classes), 2003 (All Classes), 2004 (All Classes), 2009 (4A)
- Men's Outdoor Track & Field: 2001 (4A), 2002 (4A), 2014 (4A)
- Women's Outdoor Track & Field: 2003 (4A)
- Wrestling Dual Team: 2001 (4A)
- Wrestling Individual Team: 2001 (4A)

== Notable alumni ==
- Bekah Brunstetter — writer and producer
- Sam Cronin — MLS player
- Divine Deablo — NFL linebacker
- Ed Gainey — Canadian football defensive back
- C. J. Harris — professional basketball player
- Cullen Moss — film, television, and voice actor
- A.J. Nicholson — NFL linebacker
- Derek Nicholson — NFL linebacker and college football coach
- J-Mee Samuels — 100-meter sprinter
- Stuart Scott — sportscaster and former ESPN SportsCenter anchor
- Ryan Taylor — NFL tight end
- Rolonda Watts — television personality and actress
- Blake Whiteheart — NFL tight end
