= Blake Whiteheart =

American football player (born 2000)

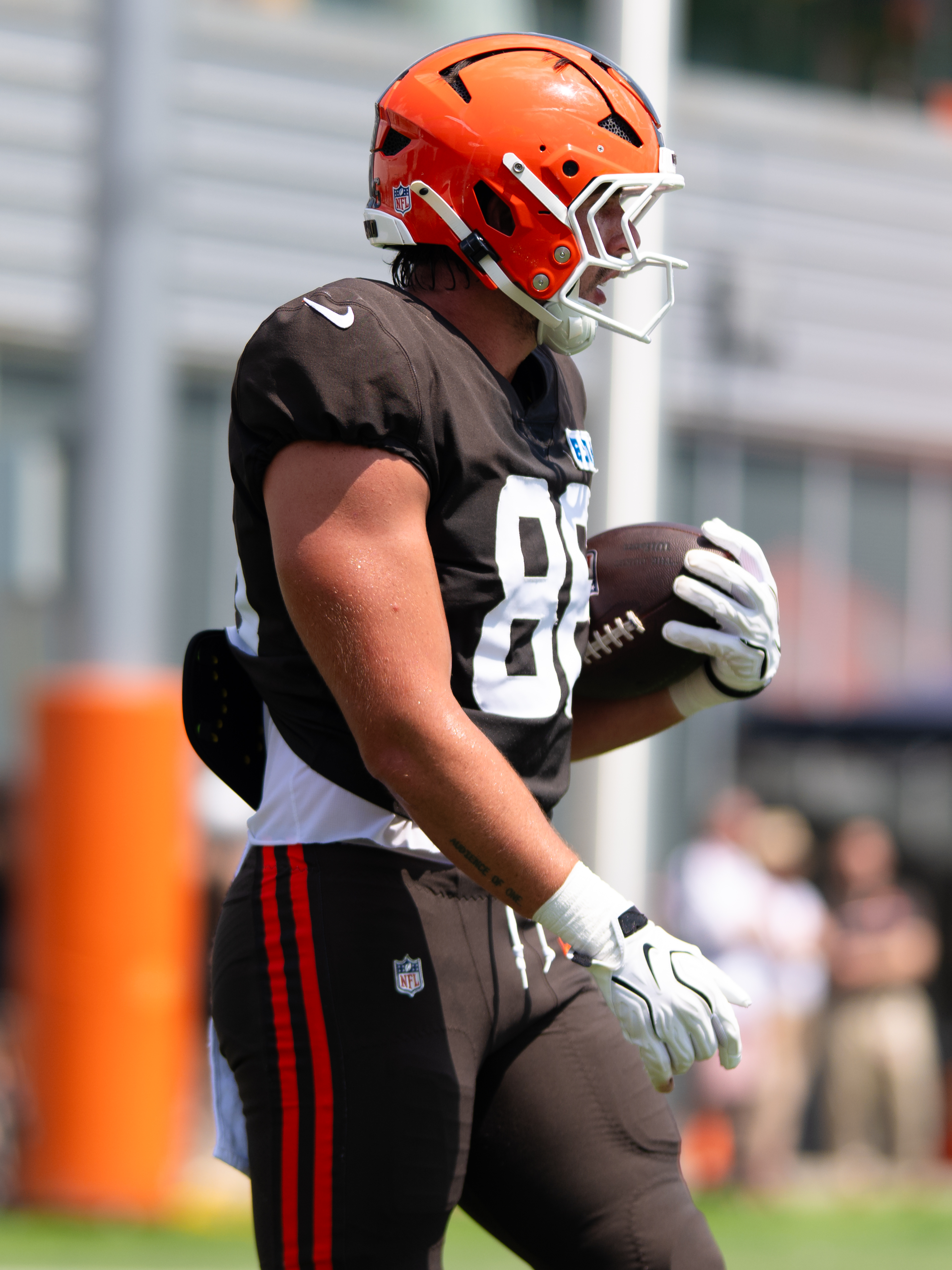
- Whiteheart with the Cleveland Browns in 2026

No. 86 – Cleveland Browns
- Position: Tight end
- Roster status: Active

Personal information
- Born: March 22, 2000 (age 26); Winston-Salem, North Carolina, U.S.
- Listed height: 6 ft 4 in (1.93 m)
- Listed weight: 250 lb (113 kg)

Career information
- High school: Mount Tabor (Winston-Salem, North Carolina)
- College: Wake Forest (2018–2022)
- NFL draft: 2023: undrafted

Career history
- Arizona Cardinals (2023); Cleveland Browns (2024–present)

Career NFL statistics as of 2025
- Receptions: 8
- Receiving yards: 55
- Receiving touchdowns: 1
- Stats at Pro Football Reference

Blake Whiteheart (born March 22, 2000) is an American professional football tight end for the Cleveland Browns of the National Football League (NFL). He played college football for the Wake Forest Demon Deacons and was signed as an undrafted free agent by the Arizona Cardinals after the 2023 NFL draft.

== Early life ==
Whiteheart grew up in Winston-Salem, North Carolina and attended Mount Tabor High School. As a senior, he caught 24 passes for 389 yards and four touchdowns. Whiteheart committed to play college football at Wake Forest over offers from Appalachian State, Southern Miss, and Old Dominion.

== College career ==
Whiteheart redshirted his true freshman season at Wake Forest. He caught 24 passes for 295 yards and three touchdowns as a senior.

== Professional career ==
Pre-draft measurables
Height	Weight	Arm length	Hand span	Wingspan	40-yard dash	10-yard split	20-yard split	20-yard shuttle	Three-cone drill	Vertical jump	Broad jump	Bench press
6 ft 3 3/4 in (1.92 m)	247 lb (112 kg)	32 1/8 in (0.82 m)	8 3/4 in (0.22 m)	6 ft 7 3/8 in (2.02 m)	4.70 s	1.63 s	2.70 s	4.24 s	6.77 s	35.5 in (0.90 m)	9 ft 7 in (2.92 m)	20 reps
All values from NFL Combine/Pro Day

=== Arizona Cardinals ===
Whiteheart was signed by the Arizona Cardinals as an undrafted free agent on May 1, 2023. On August 29, 2023, the Cardinals announced that he had made the initial 53-man roster, but he was waived one day later and re-signed to the practice squad. He was promoted to the active roster on October 24.

On August 27, 2024, Whiteheart was waived by the Cardinals.

=== Cleveland Browns ===
On August 29, 2024, Whiteheart was signed to the Cleveland Browns practice squad. He was promoted to the active roster on September 21. He was waived on October 8, and signed to the practice squad the next day. He was promoted back to the active roster on November 30.

On April 8, 2025, Whitehart signed a tendered contract with the Browns.

On March 23, 2026, Whitehard re-signed with the Browns.

== NFL career statistics ==
Legend
**Bold**	Career high

=== Regular season ===
Year	Team	Games		Receiving					Tackles			Fumbles			
Year	Team	GP	GS	Rec	Yds	Avg	Lng	TD	Cmb	Solo	Ast	FF	FR	Fum	Lost
2023	ARI	2	0	0	0	0.0	0	0	0	0	0	0	0	0	0
2024	CLE	11	2	**6**	**51**	**8.5**	**29**	**1**	0	0	0	0	0	0	0
2025	CLE	17	4	2	4	2.0	4	0	**10**	**4**	**6**	0	**1**	**1**	0
Career		30	6	8	55	6.9	29	0	10	4	6	0	1	1	0
