= Ed Gainey (Canadian football) =

American gridiron football player (born 1990)

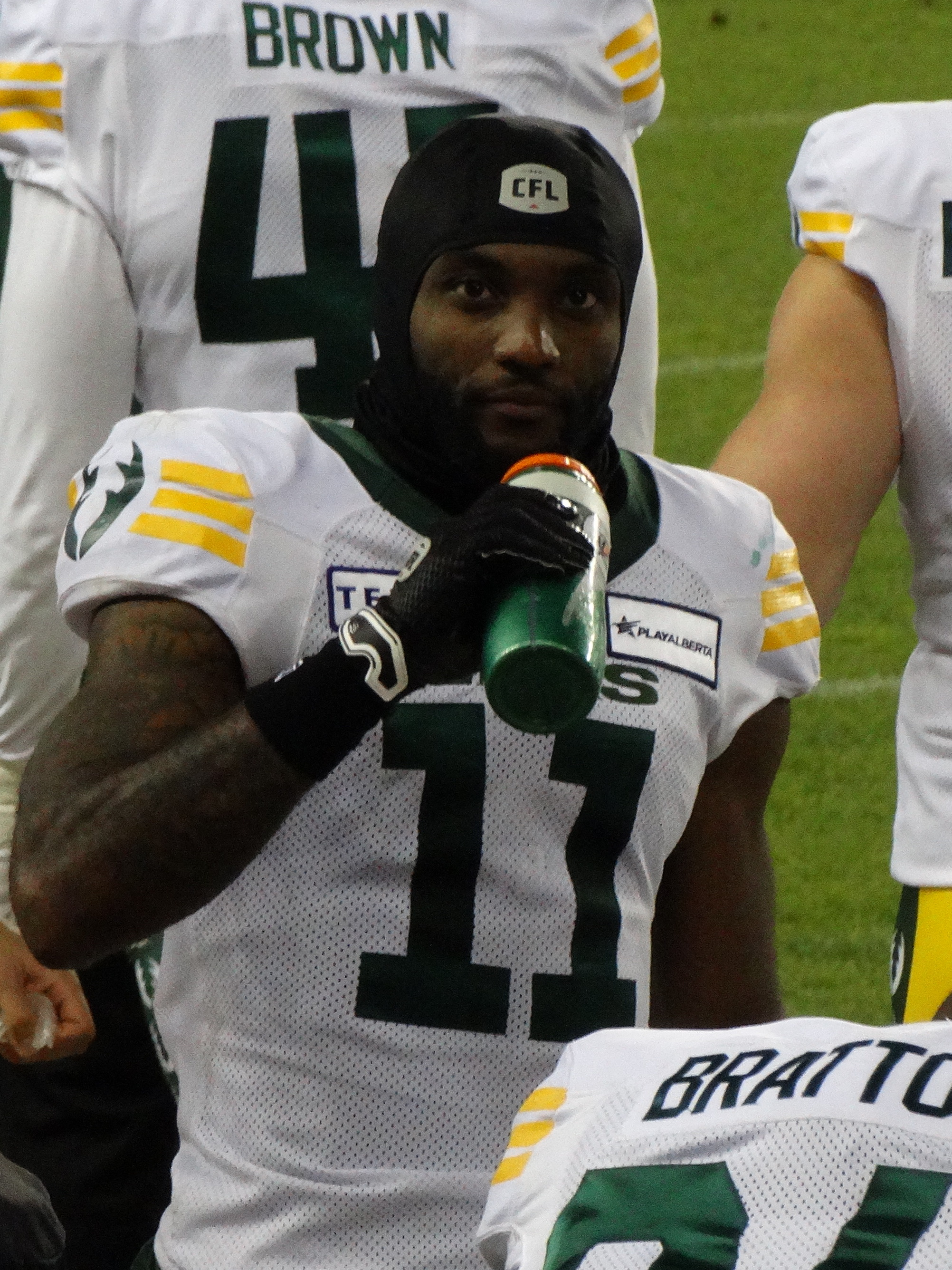
- Gainey with the Edmonton Elks in 2023

No. 11
- Position: Defensive back

Personal information
- Born: June 6, 1990 (age 36); Winston-Salem, North Carolina, U.S.
- Listed height: 5 ft 11 in (1.80 m)
- Listed weight: 193 lb (88 kg)

Career information
- High school: Mount Tabor (NC)
- College: Appalachian State

Career history
- 2012–2014: Montreal Alouettes
- 2014–2015: Hamilton Tiger-Cats
- 2016–2021: Saskatchewan Roughriders
- 2022–2023: Edmonton Elks

Awards and highlights
- 2× CFL All-Star (2017, 2018); 2× CFL West All-Star (2017, 2018); 2× Second-team All-SoCon (2009, 2010)
- Stats at CFL.ca

Edward Eugene Gainey (born June 6, 1990) is an American professional football defensive back. He played college football at Appalachian State University. He has been a member of the Montreal Alouettes, Hamilton Tiger-Cats, Saskatchewan Roughriders, and Edmonton Elks of the Canadian Football League (CFL)

== Early life ==
Gainey played high school football at Mount Tabor High School in Winston-Salem, North Carolina. He was a two-time all-region selection and Shrine Bowl participant. He intercepted six passes, forced three fumbles and was the team’s second-leading tackler his senior year, helping lead Mount Tabor to the 4-A state championship game. Gainey led the state with 13 interceptions as a junior.

== College career ==
Gainey played for the Appalachian State Mountaineers from 2008 to 2011. He finished his college career with 168 defensive tackles, five interceptions and 59 pass breakups. He was named second team All-Southern Conference in 2009 and 2010.

== Professional career ==
=== Montreal Alouettes ===
Gainey signed with the Montreal Alouettes of the Canadian Football League (CFL) on May 3, 2012. He made his CFL debut on July 6, 2012 against the Winnipeg Blue Bombers. He signed a three-year contract with the Alouettes in January 2014. Gainey was released by the Alouettes on June 21, 2014.

=== Hamilton Tiger-Cats ===
Gainey was signed by the Hamilton Tiger-Cats on July 16, 2014.

=== Saskatchewan Roughriders ===
Gainey signed with the Saskatchewan Roughriders on February 10, 2016. On August 13, 2017, during a 41–8 home victory against the BC Lions, Gainey became the first CFL player since 1986 and ninth all-time to record four interceptions in a single game. Gainey finished the year with 10 interceptions, and was named both a CFL West All-Star, and a CFL All-Star. Gainey's 2018 saw a dip in statistics due to fewer quarterbacks targeting him, but he still nabbed 3 interceptions as well as his first career sack, and was named to his second CFL All-Star team. Gainey set a career high for tackles in 2019, with 56 takedowns to go alongside two more interceptions. He signed a one-year contract extension with the Roughriders on January 25, 2021.

=== Edmonton Elks ===
Gainey signed with the Edmonton Elks to open free agency on February 8, 2022. In his first season in Edmonton, Gainey made an instant impact after contributing with 47 defensive tackles, one interception, and two forced fumbles in 18 games in 2022. On January 19, 2023 Gainey and the Elks agree to a one-year contract extension. On June 19, 2023, he was placed on the six game injured list after suffering a shoulder injury in the team's Week 2 loss

On January 23, 2024, Gainey was released by the Elks.
