= Darrell Nicholson =

American gridiron football player (born 1959)

No. 29, 72
- Position: Linebacker

Personal information
- Born: August 23, 1959 (age 67); Winston-Salem, North Carolina, U.S.
- Listed height: 6 ft 3 in (1.91 m)
- Listed weight: 235 lb (107 kg)

Career information
- High school: North Forsyth (NC)
- College: North Carolina
- NFL draft: 1982: 6th round, 156th overall pick

Career history
- New York Giants (1982); Toronto Argonauts (1983–1985); Calgary Stampeders (1985); Ottawa Rough Riders (1986)

Awards and highlights
- Grey Cup champion (1983); ACC Rookie of the Year (1978); First-team All-ACC (1980)

Darrell Nicholson (born August 23, 1959) is an American former professional football linebacker. After a career at North Carolina, where he earned first-team All-Atlantic Coast Conference honors in 1980 when the Tar Heels finished 11–1 and won the ACC with a 6–0 record, Nicholson was selected by the New York Giants in the 1982 NFL draft. After only one season, he joined the Toronto Argonauts and helped the team win the 71st Grey Cup.

In his junior season at UNC, where he was a teammate of Lawrence Taylor, Nicholson led the Tar Heels in tackles with 75 solos and 42 assists. He had been the ACC Rookie of the Year in 1978.

His sons A. J. Nicholson and Derek Nicholson played for the Florida State Seminoles.
