= Jack Endries =

American football player (born 2004)

No. 84 – Cincinnati Bengals
- Position: Tight end
- Roster status: Active

Personal information
- Born: March 26, 2004 (age 22); Manhattan Beach, California, U.S.
- Listed height: 6 ft 5 in (1.96 m)
- Listed weight: 245 lb (111 kg)

Career information
- High school: Monte Vista (Danville, California)
- College: California (2022–2024); Texas (2025)
- NFL draft: 2026: 7th round, 221st overall pick

Career history
- Cincinnati Bengals (2026–present)
- Stats at Pro Football Reference

Jack Endries (born March 26, 2004) is an American professional football tight end for the Cincinnati Bengals of the National Football League (NFL). He played college football for the California Golden Bears and Texas Longhorns and was selected by the Bengals in the seventh round of the 2026 NFL draft.

== Early life ==
Endries attended Monte Vista High School in Danville, California. In 16 games combined over his junior and senior seasons, he had 77 receptions for 1,055 yards receiving and 15 touchdowns. He committed to the University of California, Berkeley, to play college football.

== College career ==
=== California ===
Endries joined the Golden Bears as a walk-on in 2022. After redshirting that year, he started all 13 games his redshirt freshman year in 2023, recording 35 receptions for 408 yards and two touchdowns. As a redshirt sophomore in 2024, he led the team with 56 receptions for 623 yards and two touchdowns.

=== Texas ===
During the 2025 spring portal, Endries transferred to the University of Texas at Austin. Prior to the season, Endries was named to the preseason All-SEC third team, Biletnikoff Award watchlist, John Mackey Award watchlist, and Lombardi Award watchlist. In his first game with the Longhorns against Ohio State, Endries logged four receptions for 50 yards. In Week 2 against San Jose State, Endries caught two passes for 52 yards and two touchdowns, his first touchdown as a Longhorn. After Week 7, Endries was selected to the midseason watch list for the Lombardi Award. In Week 14 against Texas A&M, he caught four passes for 93 yards. In the Citrus Bowl against Michigan, Endries caught five passes for 35 yards and one touchdown. At the end of the season, he accepted an invitation for the East-West Shrine Bowl.

On January 2, 2026, Endries declared for the NFL draft, forgoing his final year of eligibility.

== Professional career ==
Pre-draft measurables
Height	Weight	Arm length	Hand span	Wingspan	40-yard dash	10-yard split	20-yard split	20-yard shuttle	Three-cone drill	Vertical jump	Broad jump	Bench press
6 ft 4 5/8 in (1.95 m)	245 lb (111 kg)	31 1/8 in (0.79 m)	9 5/8 in (0.24 m)	6 ft 4 7/8 in (1.95 m)	4.62 s	1.59 s	2.70 s	4.47 s	7.28 s	36.0 in (0.91 m)	9 ft 11 in (3.02 m)	19 reps
All values from NFL Combine/Pro Day

Endries was selected by the Cincinnati Bengals in the seventh round, 221st overall, of the 2026 NFL draft. The selection was received in 2025 from the Dallas Cowboys in exchange for LB Logan Wilson. He signed his four-year rookie contract worth $4.55 million. He signed his rookie contract on May 8. He made the Bengals 53 man roster.

== Career statistics ==
College statistics
Year	Team	Games	Receiving			
Year	Team	Games	Rec	Yds	Avg	TD
2022	California	Redshirted (redshirt)				
2023	California	13	35	407	11.6	2
2024	California	13	56	623	11.1	2
2025	Texas	13	33	346	10.5	3
Career		39	124	1,376	11.1	7
