= A. J. Nicholson =

American football player (born 1983)

No. 17, 52
- Position: Linebacker

Personal information
- Born: June 25, 1983 (age 43); Washington, D.C., U.S.
- Listed height: 6 ft 1 in (1.85 m)
- Listed weight: 240 lb (109 kg)

Career information
- High school: Mount Tabor (Winston-Salem, North Carolina)
- College: Florida State
- NFL draft: 2006: 5th round, 157th overall pick

Career history
- Cincinnati Bengals (2006); Orlando Predators (2008)*; Florida Tuskers (2009)*; Green Bay Blizzard (2011); Texas Revolution (2013)
- * Offseason or practice squad member only

Awards and highlights
- Second-team All-ACC (2005)
- Stats at Pro Football Reference

A.J. Nicholson (born June 25, 1983) is an American former professional football player who was a linebacker in the National Football League (NFL). He was selected by the Cincinnati Bengals in the fifth round of the 2006 NFL draft. He played college football for the Florida State Seminoles.

He was also a member of the Orlando Predators, Florida Tuskers, Green Bay Blizzard, and Texas Revolution.

== Early life ==
Raised in Winston-Salem, North Carolina, Nicholson was an All-American linebacker at Mount Tabor High School. As a junior, he made 170 tackles and had 23 tackles for losses. In his senior year, he registered 147 tackles. Nicholson was named a Parade All-American and to the USA Today All-USA second-team.

Regarded as a four-star recruit by Rivals.com, Nicholson was ranked as the No. 3 inside linebacker in his class. After official visits to Texas, Florida State, Miami (FL), Tennessee, and North Carolina—his father's alma mater—Nicholson chose to play for the Seminoles.

== College career ==
In his true freshman season, Nicholson saw action as a member of special teams as well as a backup outside linebacker behind returning starter Kendyll Pope. He had 14 unassisted tackles and nine assisted tackles, ranking 20th on the team and first among all Seminoles freshmen. His season-high five tackles came on two occasions, against Clemson and North Carolina.

As a sophomore, Nicholson played in all 13 games, including three starts (Duke, Wake Forest, and Notre Dame), and recorded 55 total tackles, three tackles for loss, two pass break-ups, four QB hurries, three recovered fumbles and a forced fumble. In his first career start against Duke, Nicholson recorded seven tackles, one tackle for loss and recovered two fumbles including one he returned for a touchdown. His season-best game occurred on his second career start against Wake Forest, as he tallied 12 tackles (nine solo).

Following the graduation of Pope, Nicholson took over as starting weakside linebacker in his junior season. He led all Seminoles with 88 tackles on the year, and was third on the team in sacks with four. He also recorded a team-best two fumble recoveries. In the 29–7 win against Duke, Nicholson recorded a season-high 14 tackles and also had two tackles for loss. He registered 12 tackles, one for loss and an interception in the Seminoles victory in the Gator Bowl against West Virginia.

During the off-season in February 2005, Nicholson was arrested for driving under the influence in Leon County, Florida, and was later ordered to serve three days of jail time in work camp and pay a $402 fine. In June, he was arrested for resisting an officer outside of a nightclub near FSU campus, a charge that was later dropped. In his senior season, Nicholson started all 12 regular season games, leading the defense with 100 tackles including 53 unassisted. He also tied Buster Davis for third on the team in tackles for loss with 10.5. In four games of the season, he tallied double-digit tackles. Nicholson earned Walter Camp National Defensive Player of the Week honors after a career game at Boston College, in which he recorded 19 tackles (17 solo) and two interceptions (including the one returned for a score). In the regular season finale at Florida, Nicholson had 10 tackles and forced a fumble. He was a Butkus Award semifinalist and second-team All-ACC selection.

Nicholson got suspended from his final college game, the Orange Bowl against Penn State, after sexually assaulting a 19-year-old female at the team hotel in Hollywood, Florida.

== Professional career ==
Pre-draft measurables
Height	Weight	Arm length	Hand span	40-yard dash	10-yard split	20-yard split	20-yard shuttle	Three-cone drill	Broad jump	Bench press
6 ft 0 3/4 in (1.85 m)	252 lb (114 kg)	32 1/8 in (0.82 m)	10 7/8 in (0.28 m)	4.90 s	1.69 s	2.82 s	4.43 s	7.37 s	9 ft 8 in (2.95 m)	25 reps
All values from NFL Combine

Described as “a solid athlete with a well-rounded game,” Nicholson was projected as a mid-sixth round pick by Sports Illustrated. He was selected by the Cincinnati Bengals in the fifth round of the 2006 NFL draft. In May 2006, Nicholson and former Seminoles teammate Fred Rouse were charged with stealing electronic equipment worth approximately $1,700 from the home of Lorenzo Booker, then a junior at Florida State. Nicholson played in two games in the 2006 NFL season, and was cut in the off-season.

On November 17, 2007, he was signed to a one-year deal to play with the Orlando Predators of the Arena Football League. He was cut on Friday, February 22, 2008. In 2011, he played for the Green Bay Blizzard. Nicholson was signed by the Texas Revolution of the Indoor Football League for the 2013 season.

== Personal life ==
Nicholson's father, Darrell Nicholson, played linebacker for the North Carolina Tar Heels and New York Giants.

Prior to being drafted by the Bengals, he was arrested on two counts of alcohol-related issues.

In 2006, Nicholson was arrested for burglary.
