= Isaiah Horton =

American football player (born 2003)

No. 7 – Texas A&M Aggies
- Position: Wide receiver
- Class: Redshirt Senior

Personal information
- Born: November 19, 2003 (age 23)
- Listed height: 6 ft 4 in (1.93 m)
- Listed weight: 208 lb (94 kg)

Career information
- High school: Oakland (Murfreesboro, Tennessee)
- College: Miami (2022–2024); Alabama (2025); Texas A&M (2026–present)
- Stats at ESPN

Isaiah Horton (born November 19, 2003) is an American college football wide receiver for the Texas A&M Aggies. He previously played for the Miami Hurricanes and the Alabama Crimson Tide.

== Early life ==
Horton originally attended The Ensworth School in Nashville, Tennessee his freshman and sophomore years before transferring to Oakland High School in Murfreesboro, Tennessee for his junior and senior years. He had 37 receptions for 702 yards and 10 touchdowns his junior year and 34 receptions for 643 yards with seven touchdowns as a senior. He committed to the University of Miami to play college football.

== College career ==
=== Miami (FL) ===
Horton played in four games and had one reception for six yards his first year at Miami in 2022 and was redshirted. In 2023, he played in all 13 games with two starts and had 13 receptions for 168 yards and a touchdown. Horton returned to Miami in 2024 and earned more playing time than his first two seasons.

=== Alabama ===
In December 2024, Horton announced he would enter the transfer portal to play for the Alabama Crimson Tide. During his tenure at Alabama, Horton played in 15 games and had 42 receptions for 511 yards and 8 touchdowns.

=== Texas A&M ===
In January 2026, Horton announced he would enter the transfer portal to play for the Texas A&M Aggies.

=== Statistics ===
Year	Team	Games		Receiving			
Year	Team	GP	GS	Rec	Yds	Avg	TD
2022	Miami	4	0	1	6	6.0	0
2023	Miami	13	2	13	168	12.9	1
2024	Miami	12	4	56	616	11.0	5
2025	Alabama	15	11	42	511	12.2	8
Career		44	17	112	1,301	11.6	14
