= Damien Martinez =

American football player (born 2004)

Colorado Stampede
- Position: Running back
- Roster status: Unsigned draft pick

Personal information
- Born: January 31, 2004 (age 22); Lewisville, Texas, U.S.
- Listed height: 6 ft 0 in (1.83 m)
- Listed weight: 217 lb (98 kg)

Career information
- High school: Lewisville
- College: Oregon State (2022–2023); Miami (2024)
- NFL draft: 2025: 7th round, 223rd overall pick

Career history
- Seattle Seahawks (2025)*; Green Bay Packers (2025)*; Colorado Stampede (2027–present)
- * Offseason or practice squad member only

Awards and highlights
- Pac-12 Offensive Freshman of the Year (2022); 2× First team All-Pac-12 (2022, 2023)
- Stats at Pro Football Reference

Damien Martinez (born January 31, 2004) is an American professional football running back for the Colorado Stampede of the United Football League (UFL). He played college football for the Oregon State Beavers and the Miami Hurricanes. Martinez was selected by the Seattle Seahawks in the seventh round of the 2025 NFL draft.

== Early life ==
Martinez attended Lewisville High School in Lewisville, Texas, where he rushed for 4,341 yards and 66 touchdowns on 532 carries for the football team. He was an all-state running back and earned District Offensive Player of the Year and District MVP honors. Martinez committed to play college football at Oregon State over Georgia Tech and Kansas.

== College career ==
As a freshman in 2022, Martinez had a slow start to the first seven games of the year rushing for 340 yards and two touchdowns on 57 carries. However, in the eighth game he rushed for 178 yards and three touchdowns on 22 carries in a win over Colorado, earning Pac-12 Conference freshman of the week honors. Martinez was named the Pac-12 freshman of the week two more times, one against Arizona State on November 21, after rushing for 138 yards and two touchdowns, and again against Oregon after getting 15 carries for 103 yards in a 38–34 rivalry win. He finished the year with 982 rushing yards and seven touchdowns on 162 carries, and caught four passes for 61 yards. Martinez was named the Pac-12 Freshman of the year and first-team All-Pac 12, as well as a Freshman All-American by College Football News.

In 2024 Martinez transferred to the University of Miami where he rushed for 1002 yards over 13 games. Martinez was the ACC Running Back of the Week after rushing for 148 yards and two touchdowns against Florida State.

=== Statistics ===
Year	Team	Games		Rushing				Receiving			
Year	Team	GP	GS	Att	Yards	Avg	TD	Rec	Yards	Avg	TD
2022	Oregon State	13	5	161	982	6.1	7	4	61	15.3	0
2023	Oregon State	12	12	194	1,185	6.1	9	11	126	11.5	0
2024	Miami	13	12	145	1,002	5.7	9	16	198	12.4	0
Career		37	29	500	3,169	6.0	25	31	385	12.4	0

== Professional career ==
Pre-draft measurables
Height	Weight	Arm length	Hand span	Wingspan	40-yard dash	10-yard split	20-yard split	20-yard shuttle	Three-cone drill	Vertical jump	Broad jump
5 ft 11 5/8 in (1.82 m)	217 lb (98 kg)	30 1/2 in (0.77 m)	9 1/2 in (0.24 m)	6 ft 3 1/4 in (1.91 m)	4.51 s	1.56 s	2.63 s	4.49 s	7.16 s	35.0 in (0.89 m)	10 ft 4 in (3.15 m)
All values from NFL Combine/Pro Day

=== Seattle Seahawks ===
Martinez was selected by the Seattle Seahawks with the 223rd pick in the seventh round of the 2025 NFL draft. He was waived on August 26, 2025 as part of final roster cuts and re-signed to the practice squad the next day. He was released on September 19.

=== Green Bay Packers ===
On December 30, 2025, Martinez was signed to the Green Bay Packers' practice squad. He signed a reserve/future contract with Green Bay on January 12, 2026. On August 30, Martinez was released by the Packers as a part of final roster cuts.

=== Colorado Stampede ===
On November 19, 2026, Martinez was drafted by the Colorado Stampede in the 2027 UFL Draft.

== Personal life ==
On November 29, 2023, Martinez was arrested on suspicion of driving under the influence. No charges were filed against Martinez.
