= Jonathan Brady =

American football player (born 2003)

Montreal Alouettes
- Positions: Wide receiver, return specialist
- Roster status: Active
- CFL status: American

Personal information
- Born: October 8, 2003 (age 23); Compton, California, U.S.
- Listed height: 5 ft 9 in (1.75 m)
- Listed weight: 185 lb (84 kg)

Career information
- High school: Bishop Gorman (Las Vegas, Nevada)
- College: New Mexico State (2022–2023); California (2024); Indiana (2025)
- NFL draft: 2026: undrafted

Career history
- Las Vegas Raiders (2026)*; Montreal Alouettes (2026–present)
- * Offseason or practice squad member only

Awards and highlights
- CFP national champion (2025); Second-team All-Big Ten (2025)
- Stats at ESPN

Jonathan Brady (born October 8, 2003) is an American professional football wide receiver and return specialist for the Montreal Alouettes of the Canadian Football League (CFL). He played college football for the New Mexico State Aggies, California Golden Bears, and Indiana Hoosiers.

== Early life ==
Brady was born October 8, 2003, in Compton, California and attended Bishop Gorman High School in Las Vegas, Nevada. In his senior season on the football team, the team won a state championship while Brady recorded 31 receptions for 670 yards and seven touchdowns, earning first-team all-state honors. Rated a three-star college football recruit by ESPN and 247Sports, Brady committed to play for the New Mexico State Aggies.

== College career ==
Brady played in 13 games for the New Mexico State Aggies in 2022, with nine starts. He recorded 310 receiving yards, for three touchdowns, 200 kick return yards, and 101 rushing yards. In 2023, he appeared in 15 games with 12 starts, recording 621 yards for four touchdowns, 35 rushing yards for one touchdown, and 117 kick return yards.

Brady transferred to play for the California Golden Bears in 2024. He played in all 13 games and recorded 36 receptions for 386 yards and three touchdowns, adding five rushes for 28 yards. Two of his touchdowns came in the fourth quarter of the Big Game, a rivalry game against the Stanford Cardinal, enabling a 24–21 comeback win for California.

Brady entered the NCAA transfer portal after the 2024 season. He was recruited by the Miami Hurricanes, Virginia Tech Hokies, and Tennessee Volunteers, but ultimately transferred to play the 2025 season for the Indiana Hoosiers. He joined his teammate, quarterback Fernando Mendoza, who had already announced he would also transfer from California to Indiana. In a game against the Old Dominion Monarchs, Brady returned a punt for a 91-yard touchdown. Indiana finished the season with a win in the 2026 College Football Playoff National Championship. Brady was named second-team All-Big Ten as a return specialist for the 2025 season.

== Professional career ==
Pre-draft measurables
Height	Weight	Arm length	Hand span	Wingspan	40-yard dash	10-yard split	20-yard split	20-yard shuttle	Three-cone drill	Vertical jump	Broad jump	Bench press
5 ft 8 3/4 in (1.75 m)	185 lb (84 kg)	30 1/8 in (0.77 m)	9 in (0.23 m)	6 ft 1 in (1.85 m)	4.51 s	1.61 s	2.56 s	4.30 s	7.34 s	37.5 in (0.95 m)	10 ft 6 in (3.20 m)	15 reps
All values from Pro Day

=== Las Vegas Raiders ===
On May 4, 2026, Brady signed with the Las Vegas Raiders as an undrafted free agent. He was waived on July 27.

=== Montreal Alouettes ===
On October 5, 2026, Brady signed a futures contract with the Montreal Alouettes of the Canadian Football League (CFL).
