= Dametra Cafe =

Coordinates: 36°33′17.6″N 121°55′24.44″W

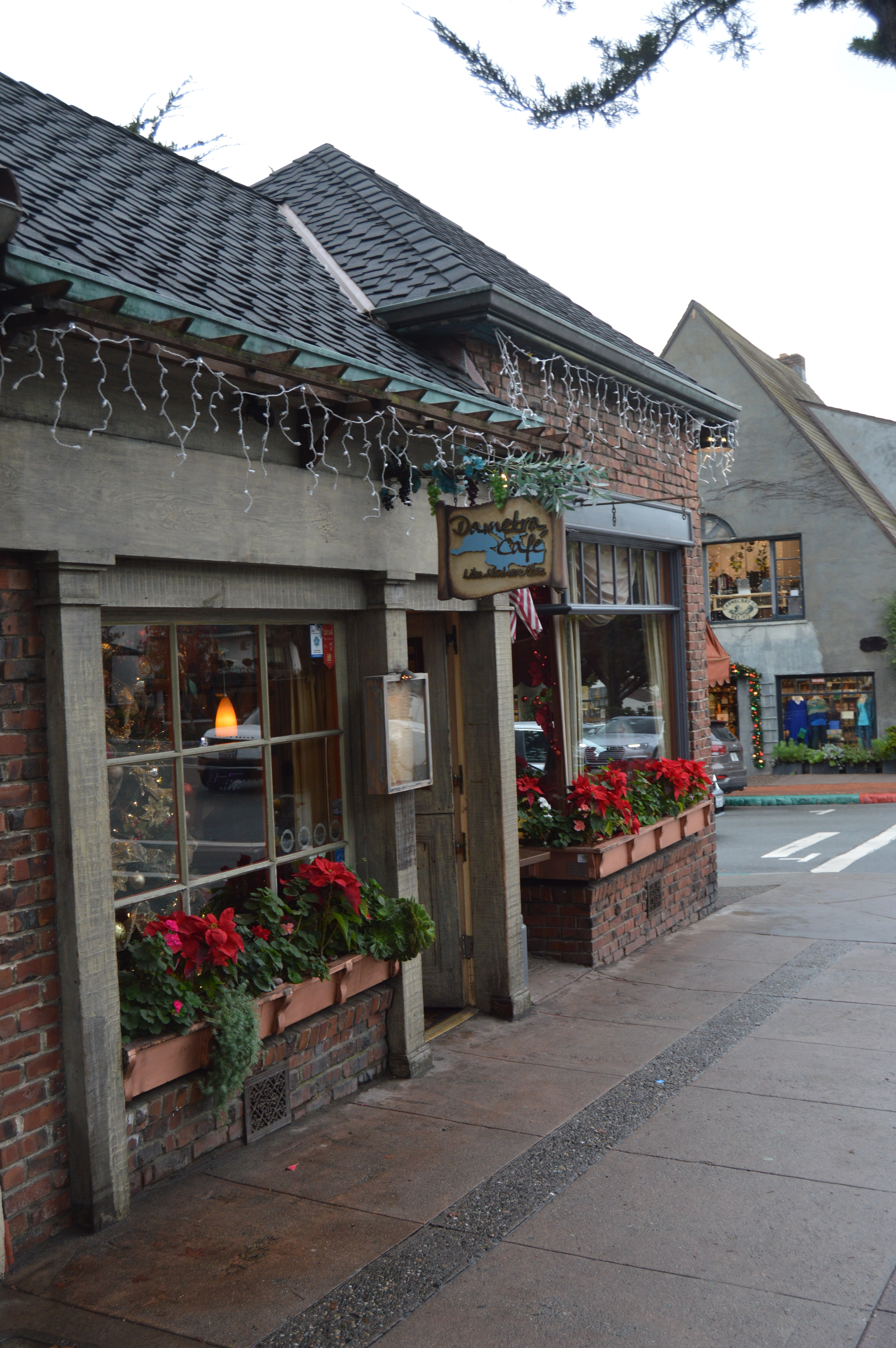
- Interactive map of Dametra Cafe

Restaurant information
- Established: June 2008
- Owners: Faisal Nimri; Bashar Sneeh
- Chef: Faisal Nimri
- Food type: Greek; Mediterranean
- Dress code: Casual
- Location: Corner Of Ocean & Lincoln St, Carmel-by-the-Sea, Monterey, California, 93921, United States
- Seating capacity: 33
- Reservations: Yes
- Other locations: Dametra Fresh Mediterranean, Del Monte Shopping Center, Monterey, California
- Website: dametracafe.com

Dametra Cafe is a Mediterranean and Middle Eastern restaurant in Carmel-by-the-Sea, California, United States. It also has a second, smaller, fast-food location in Monterey, California.

== History ==
Dametra Cafe is co-owned by Bashar Sneeh, from Syria, and Faisal Nimri, from Jordan. Nimri also serves as executive chef. Nimri moved to the United States in 1994 with his parents and started working in Monterey as a teenager in the restaurant business. In 1998, he opened Da Giovanni in Carmel-by-the-Sea. Nimri wanted to open a restaurant that served Middle Eastern food similar to what his family made. He met Sneeh, who relocated to the US from Syria in 2004. Sneeh was working at a gas station in Pebble Beach when he met Nimri. Sneeh became involved in the food industry and came to manage three area restaurants. They opened Dametra Cafe in June 2008. Dametra is a portmanteau of Damascus and Petra.

The cafe has live music and belly dancers. The decor includes a rose-colored stone signature of Petra. The restaurant was named "Business of the Year" by the Carmel Chamber of Commerce in 2010. Customers can make reservations, and walk-up customers wait in line outside. The restaurant serves Greek wine, including Boutrai.

In 2014, they opened a second location in Monterey. The second location, Dametra Fresh Mediterranean, serves mainly Greek fast food. A third location, Dametra and the General, is a fast casual restaurant and sports bar. It opened in Marina in 2018. The bar’s 30-foot-long, L-shaped parquet bar top was rescued from Fort Ord’s Stilwell Hall.

== Cuisine ==
Dametra Cafe serves food from the Middle East. The menu includes calamari, moussaka, cioppino, smoked salmon, hummus, lamb shank, gyros, kebabs and spanikopita.
