= Fort Ord =

Former U.S. Army Fort in California

Fort Ord National Monument
- Monterey Bay area, California
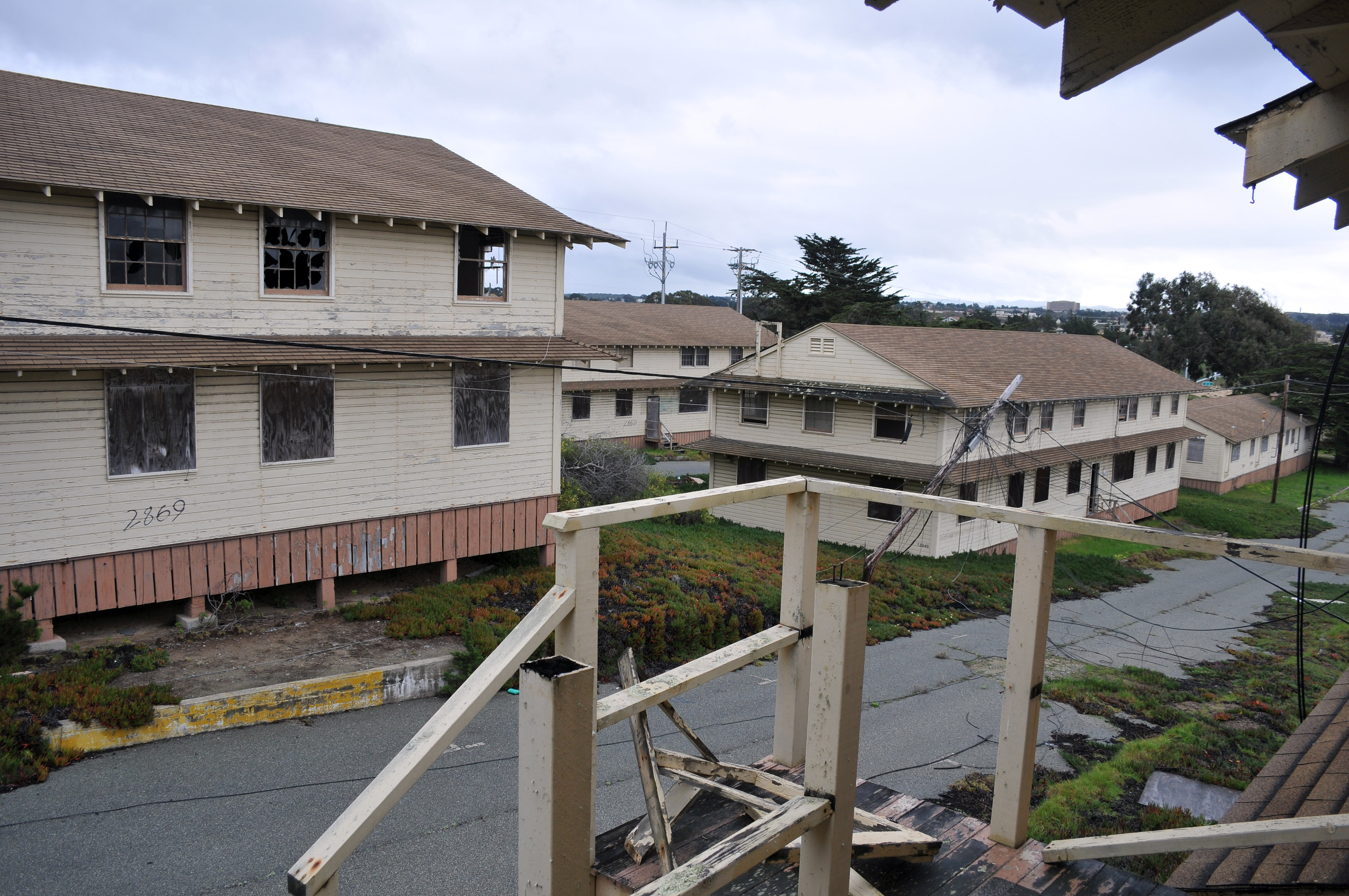
- Abandoned Army barracks at Fort Ord

Site information
- Type: Army Post
- Controlled by: United States Army
- Website: Fort Ord National Monument

Location
- Location within California Location within the United States
- Coordinates: 36.64°N 121.74°W

Site history
- Built: 1917
- In use: 1917–1994
- Battles/wars: None

Garrison information
- Current commander: None; post closed in 1994

Fort Ord is a former United States Army post on Monterey Bay on the Pacific Ocean coast in California, which closed in 1994 due to Base Realignment and Closure (BRAC) action. Most of the fort's land now makes up the Fort Ord National Monument, managed by the United States Bureau of Land Management as part of the National Conservation Lands, while a small portion remains an active military installation under Army control, designated the Ord Military Community.

Before construction and official designation as a fort in 1940, the land was used as a maneuver area and field-artillery target range beginning in 1917. Fort Ord was considered one of the most attractive locations of any U.S. Army post because of its proximity to the beach and California weather. The 7th Infantry Division was its main garrison for many years. When Fort Ord was later converted to civilian use, space was set aside for the first nature reserve in the United States created for conservation of an insect, the endangered Smith's blue butterfly. Additional endangered species are found on Fort Ord, including Contra Costa goldfields and the threatened California tiger salamander.

While much of the old military buildings and infrastructure remain abandoned, many structures have been torn down for anticipated development. California State University, Monterey Bay (CSUMB) and Fort Ord Dunes State Park, along with some subdivisions, the Veterans Transition Center, a commercial strip mall, a recreational skydiving facility, military facilities, and a nature preserve occupy the area today.

On April 20, 2012, President Barack Obama signed a proclamation designating a 14,651-acre (5,929 ha) portion of the former post as the Fort Ord National Monument. In his proclamation, the President stated "The protection of the Fort Ord area will maintain its historical and cultural significance, attract tourists and recreationalists from near and far, and enhance its unique natural resources, for the enjoyment of all Americans."

== History ==
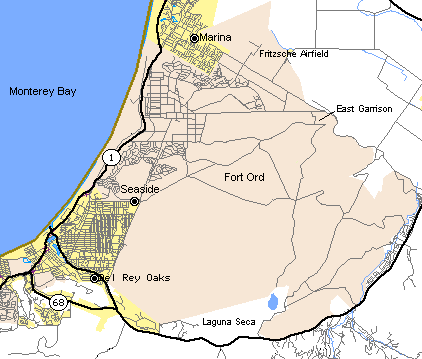
Map showing Fort Ord

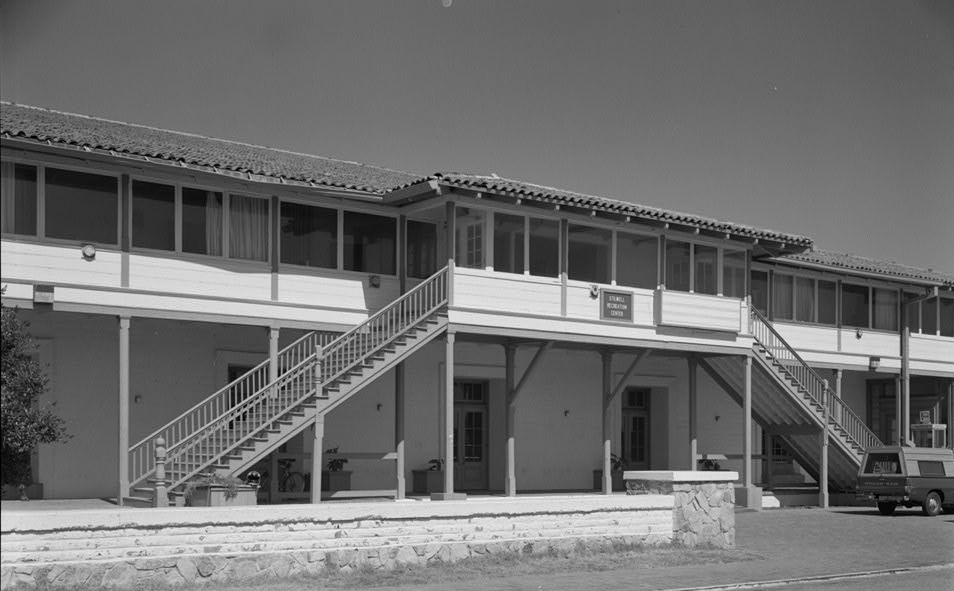
Stilwell Hall, the Fort Ord Soldiers' Club in 1992. Stilwell Hall was the largest soldiers' club constructed in the west, in 1943. Named to honor General "Vinegar Joe" Stilwell, it was built in Mission Revival style.

After the American entry into World War I, land was purchased just north of the city of Monterey along Monterey Bay for use as an artillery training field for the United States Army by the U.S. Department of War. The area was known as the Gigling Reservation, U.S. Field Artillery Area, Presidio of Monterey and Gigling Field Artillery Range. Although military development and construction was just beginning, the war only lasted for another year and a half until the armistice on November 11, 1918.

Despite a great demobilization of the U.S. Armed Forces during the inter-war years of the 1920s and 1930s, by 1933, the artillery field became Camp Ord, named in honor of Union Army Maj. Gen. Edward Otho Cresap Ord (1818–1883). Primarily, horse cavalry units trained on the camp until the military began to mechanize and train mobile combat units such as tanks, armored personnel carriers and movable artillery.

By 1940, the 23-year-old Camp Ord was expanded to 2,000 acres (810 ha), with the realization that the two-year-old conflict of World War II could soon cross the Atlantic Ocean to involve America. In August 1940, it was re-designated Fort Ord and the 7th Infantry Division was reactivated, becoming the first major unit to occupy the post. Sub-camps were built around the Fort to support the new training of Troops, Camp Clayton. Camp Clayton was built near CA Highway 1, the South Dakota National Guard 147th Artillery were the first unit to train at the new camp.

In 1941, Camp Ord became Fort Ord. Soon the first threat came from the west as the Imperial Japanese Navy struck the island of Oahu, Hawaii at Pearl Harbor near Honolulu in an unannounced air attack, Sunday, December 7. In a few days the other Axis powers, such as Adolf Hitler's Nazi Germany, along with Fascist Italy of Benito Mussolini, declared and spread war in Europe against Great Britain, France and the Low Countries to the U.S.

The end of the war came with the surrenders of Germany, in May, and Japan, in September 1945. The subsequent onset of the Cold War against the Soviet Union caused increased tensions which continued for the next forty some years into the early 1990s. In 1947, Fort Ord became the home of the 4th Replacement Training Center. During the 1950s and 1960s, Fort Ord was a staging area for units departing for war in the Korean War and later peacetime/occupation duty in Japan, South Korea, the Philippines and Thailand. Then, when Southeast Asia became a war zone with Vietnam (and later involving, by the 1970s, Cambodia and Laos), the United States had, at one time, 50,000 troops on the installation. The 194th Armored Brigade was activated there under Combat Development Command in 1957, but departed for Fort Knox in Kentucky in 1960.

Between 1952 and 1954 the Del E. Webb Construction Company was hired to construct some 42 new permanent buildings to make Fort Ord a permanent Army post. The total cost of construction was more than $20,000,000. The first buildings completed were dormitories followed by a guard house and stockade. Additional buildings constructed as part of the plan were an administrative headquarters building, quartermaster warehouses, and an improved water storage system. There were a total of 31 dormitory buildings that could house 7,000 men.

In 1957, land on the eastern side of the post was used to create the Laguna Seca Raceway which served to replace the Pebble Beach road racing course that ceased operations for safety reasons in that same year.

The post continued as a center for instruction of basic and advanced infantrymen until 1976, when the training area was deactivated and Fort Ord again became the home of the 7th Infantry Division, following their return from South Korea after twenty-five years on the DMZ ("demilitarized zone").

On July 14, 1989, the U.S. Environmental Protection Agency (EPA) proposed placement of Fort Ord on the National Priorities List (NPL). The site contained leaking underground petroleum storage tanks, a 150-acre (61 ha) landfill that was primarily used to dispose of residential waste and small amounts of commercial waste generated by the base, a former fire drill area, motor pool maintenance areas, small dump sites, small arms target ranges, an 8,000-acre (3,200 ha) firing range, and other limited areas that posed threats from unexploded ordnance. NPL status was finalized on February 21, 1990.

The final basic training classes were held in 1975.

== Closing the Fort, 1994 ==
The Base Realignment and Closure Commission of 1991 recommended closing the post and moving the units stationed at Fort Ord to Fort Lewis, Washington. On May 2, 1992, Army elements from Fort Ord along with Marines from Marine Corps Base Camp Pendleton participated in quelling the 1992 Los Angeles riots. In 1994, Fort Ord was finally closed. Most of the land was returned to the State of California for further public use and became the home of the new California State University, Monterey Bay (CSUMB). The remainder was given to the University of California, Santa Cruz to be developed into the "UC MBEST" (Monterey Bay Education, Science and Technology) Center. The MBEST Center is a regional economic development effort focused on developing collaborative research-business opportunities in the Monterey Bay region.

== Fort Ord Reuse Authority (FORA) ==
The Fort Ord Reuse Authority (FORA) is responsible for the oversight of Monterey Bay area economic recovery from the closure of and reuse planning of the former Fort Ord. The military base was located on the California coastline near the Monterey Peninsula, consisting of 28,000 acres (44 sq mi; 11,000 ha) of land. FORA implements this legislatively mandated mission by overseeing replacement land use; assuring compliance with adopted measures; removing physical barriers to reuse; financing and constructing major components of the required infrastructure and base wide demands; and protecting identified environmental reserves. FORA exercises its planning, financing, and monitoring responsibilities under state law authority to meet these objectives in the best interest of the northern Monterey Bay community.

FORA is small multi-governmental body, composed of elected officials at the local, state, and federal levels, as well as representatives from the United States Armed Forces and educational bodies such as CSUMB at the primary, secondary, and university levels. Voting members are made up of representatives from the cities of Carmel-by-the-Sea, Del Rey Oaks, Marina, Sand City, Monterey, Pacific Grove, Salinas, and Seaside as well as two representatives from the County of Monterey Ex-officio members are composed of representatives from the Monterey Peninsula Community College District, the Monterey Peninsula Unified School District, California's 17th congressional district, California's 15th State Senate district, California's 27th State Assembly district, the United States Army, the Chancellor of the California State University, the President of the University of California, the Monterey County Water Resources Agency, and the Transportation Agency of Monterey County.

This legislatively mandated mission is directed by FORA's 1997 Fort Ord Base Reuse Plan (Reuse Plan). In 2012, FORA performed a comprehensive Reuse Plan Reassessment to assess remaining work.

== Ongoing environmental cleanup efforts ==
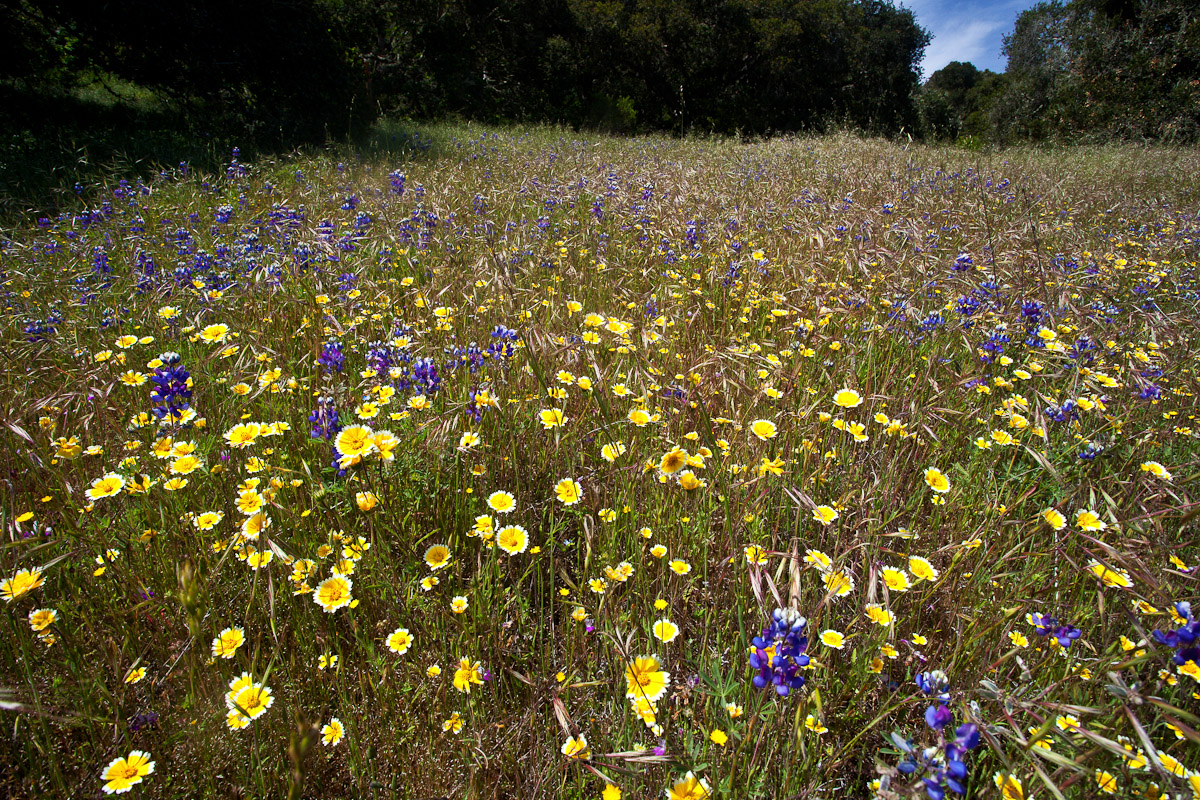
Wildflowers at Fort Ord

=== The Army's Fort Ord cleanup project ===
The Army's environmental cleanup of the former Fort Ord has been underway since the base was closed and is separated into two programs – the Soil and Groundwater Contamination Cleanup Program, and the Munitions and Explosives of Concern (MEC) Program. A Federal Facility Agreement was signed by the Army, EPA, California Department of Toxic Substances Control and the California Regional Water Quality Control Board Central Coast Region in 1990. Additionally, the Army provides oversight on FORA's cleanup program, called the Environmental Services Cooperative Agreement (see below).

=== FORA's privatized cleanup project ===
In May 2007, the Fort Ord Reuse Authority voluntarily entered into an Administrative Order on Consent with EPA and the California Department of Toxic Substances Control (DTSC) for the cleanup of 3,484 acres (1,410 ha) of Fort Ord land. The Army and EPA provide the necessary oversight on the project, referred to as FORA's Environmental Services Cooperative Agreement (ESCA). Under this privatized cleanup scheme, FORA received these properties through early transfer and is responsible for the cleanup of these specific areas of Fort Ord. The Administrative Order on Consent requires FORA to clean up the parcels to an extent that would protect human health and environment.

== Present-day Fort Ord ==
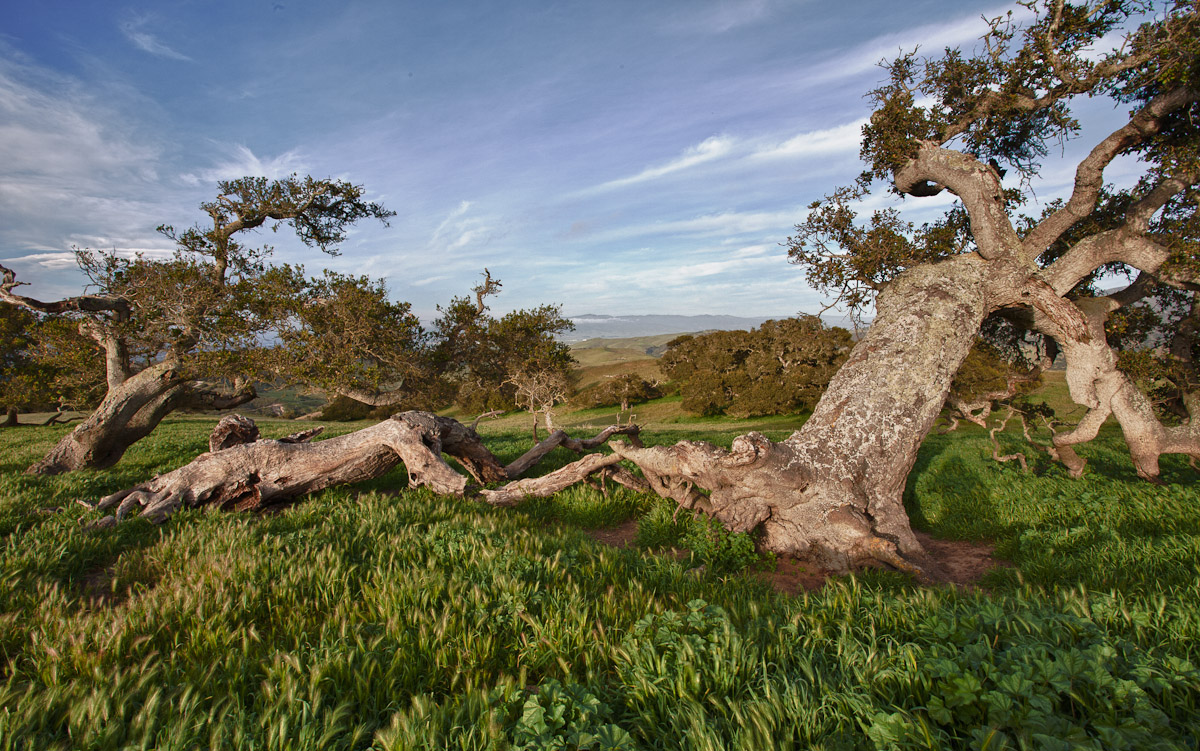
Old Coast Live Oak at Fort Ord

Fort Ord's former military golf courses, Bayonet and Black Horse, are, as of January 16, 1997, public golf courses. They have hosted PGA golf events and were renovated in the mid-2010s.

=== Monterey Peninsula College ===
==== MPC, Marina Campus ====
Monterey Peninsula College (MPC) operated the Fort Ord Education Center from 1971 to 1993, providing military service members and their families with Associate degrees. When Fort Ord was being decommissioned, FORA authorized MPC to continue operating its Education Center. MPC then changed the name of the center to the Marina Education Center (MEC), where it continued to provide postsecondary education for the service area of Marina, Sand City, and Seaside, focusing on what the school called "basic skills courses." Later, MPC changed the name of MEC to the Monterey Peninsula College at Marina (MPC Marina). In 2020, MPC allocated $100million to expand the MPC Marina campus.

==== Seaside Public Safety Training Center ====
FORA also authorized MPC to acquire other properties, and in 1993, they established the Seaside Public Safety Training Center (SPSTC or MPC PSTC), which is next to the Presidio Police Department and the Law College. SPSTC hosts a fire academy, police academy, and emergency responder courses, including emergency medical technician (EMT) training. FORA also allocated MPC the former MOUT site, and the former area of Parker Flats to incorporate into these academies, but these properties are still awaiting environmental cleanup assessments to finish before MPC, or any other agency, incorporates them into any future training program.

=== Monterey College of Law ===
The Monterey College of Law (MCL) is a private, non-profit law school founded in 1972. The school is approved by the Committee of Bar Examiners of the State Bar of California and is accredited by the Western Association of Schools and Colleges (WASC), but is not accredited by the American Bar Association. Graduates of this program are allowed to sit for the California Bar Exam, but not Bar Exams in other states. MCL is located on Malmedy Road, next to the Monterey Bar Association building, and the Seaside Public Safety Training Center.

=== California State University, Monterey Bay ===
California State University, Monterey Bay opened on the Fort's former ground shortly after Fort Ord's closing in 1994 as part of 42nd President Bill Clinton's "peace dividends" program. The university has currently enrolled approximately 6,700 students. The Leon Panetta Institute (named for the former U.S. Representative and Secretary of Defense) is located on its campus. Schoonover, Frederick and Frederick II are housing developments located in the former Fort Ord created for students and families who are associated with CSUMB, Monterey Peninsula Unified School District and local school districts. All three parks are accessible off of Abrams Drive.

=== Veterans Transition Center ===
The Veterans Transition Center (VTC) is located on the site of the former Fort Ord. Since its inception it has served 4,155 single veterans and 351 veterans with families. As of 2009 the center was looking to expand by adding more housing units and a non-profit store (to be run by partner company, Vocational Rehabilitation Specialists Incorporated) with the express purpose of employing as many veterans as possible.

=== Fort Ord Dunes State Park and National Monument ===
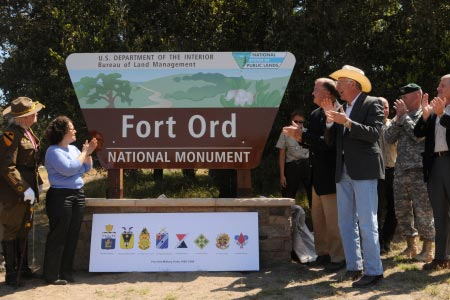
U.S. Department of the Interior Secretary Ken Salazar unveils the Fort Ord National Monument sign.

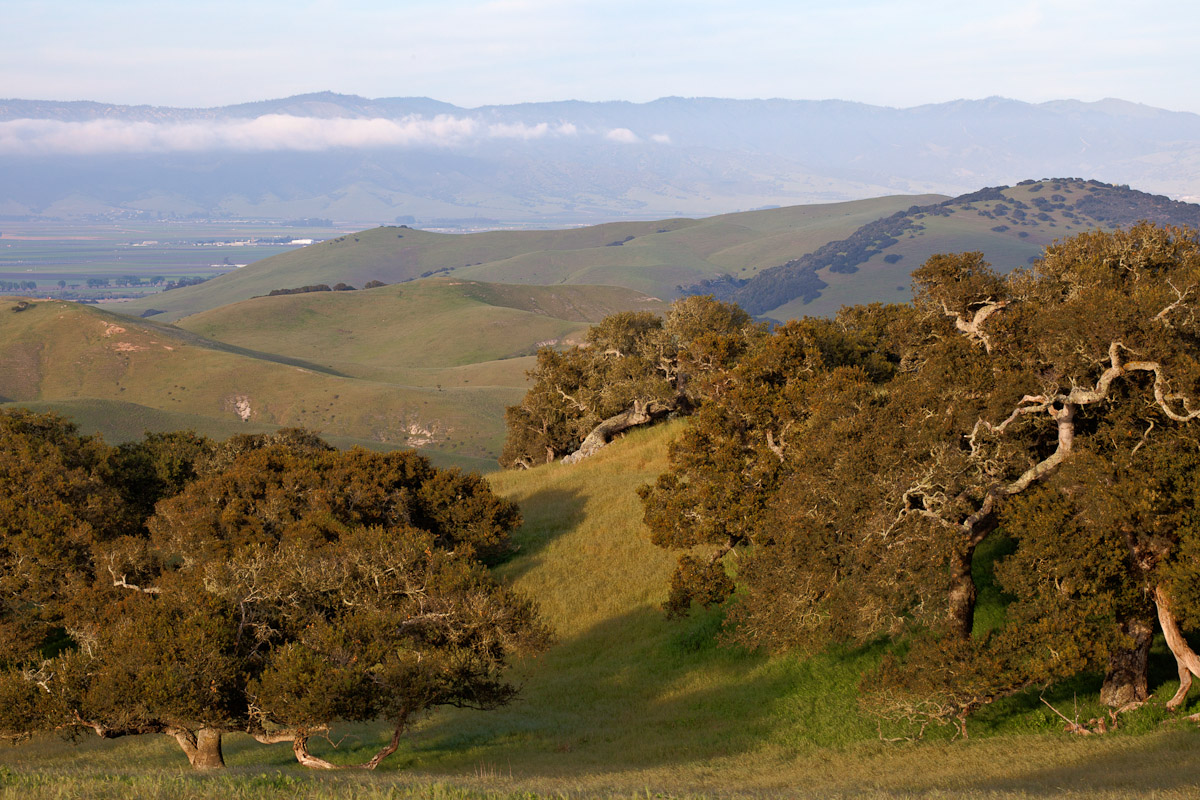
Fort Ord National Monument view

In 2009, a coastal strip overlooking Monterey Bay became California's newest state park, Fort Ord Dunes State Park. At the end of Gigling Road, where the Department of Defense Building is located, there is one of many entrances to the Fort Ord National Monument; the land underwent comprehensive remediation that involved an extensive munitions clean-up. There are more than 91 miles (146 km) of recreational trails available. They are used by the trail communities on foot, on bicycles, and on horseback. All open trails are available to all non-motorized trail user groups. A small number of trails are fenced along their edges because of possible unexploded ordnance.

On January 13, 2012, United States Secretary of the Interior Ken Salazar visited Fort Ord, addressed a crowd of 200 supporters and announced that he was proposing to President Obama that Fort Ord be elevated to national monument status. On April 20, 2012, Barack Obama signed a Presidential Proclamation establishing Fort Ord National Monument.

Fort Ord National Monument refers to that land on the former Fort Ord that is administered by the Bureau of Land Management (BLM) and is open to the general public. The BLM currently manages 7,200 acres and will manage 14,650 acres after the U.S. Army finishes environmental restoration on the remaining parcel.

As of May 2018, Fort Ord National Monument has extended its trail system to add bypass and spur trails to popular areas.

=== Remaining military presence ===
A small portion of the former Fort Ord still remains under U.S. Army control, originally called the Presidio of Monterey (POM) Annex. It is now called the Ord Military Community (described below).

The military is still present at Fort Ord, in the form of several California Army National Guard units, facilities administered by the Presidio of Monterey, the Defense Manpower Data Center, and the continued operation of the Commissary catering to the active duty military personnel stationed in the Monterey area as well as reservists, national guardsmen, and military retirees who chose to settle in the area and are entitled to shop at such facilities. Management of the military housing has been outsourced to private firms, but the homes are still occupied by personnel stationed at the Presidio of Monterey and the Naval Postgraduate School. The Ord Community AAFES Main Exchange ("PX") closed in the summer of 2023, but the AAFES service station remains open.

== Development ==
The nearby city of Marina is developing a large parcel of land from the former Fort Ord within its city limits, building more than 1,000 new homes. A large commercial strip mall along Highway 1 at the former 12th Street Gate entrance to Fort Ord opened in late 2007, and houses retail stores. The City of Marina is planning a 13-mile recreation trail to run through Fort Ord to the Fort Ord National Monument, the Salinas River, and through Fort Ord Dunes State Park.

As of December 2014, some of the land for a proposed development project (Monterey Downs) will not be officially clear of unexploded ordnance until at least late 2017.

=== List of development projects ===
- City of Marina
  - University Villages/Dunes on Monterey Bay
  - Sea Haven
  - Imjin Office Park
  - Cypress Knolls (senior-oriented residential community)
- City of Seaside
  - Seaside Resort
  - Main Gate Retail Center
  - Central Coast Veterans Cemetery
- City of Del Rey Oaks
  - Del Rey Oaks Resort (currently on hold)
- County of Monterey
  - East Garrison

== Miscellaneous ==
=== World War II Warhorse Hospital ===
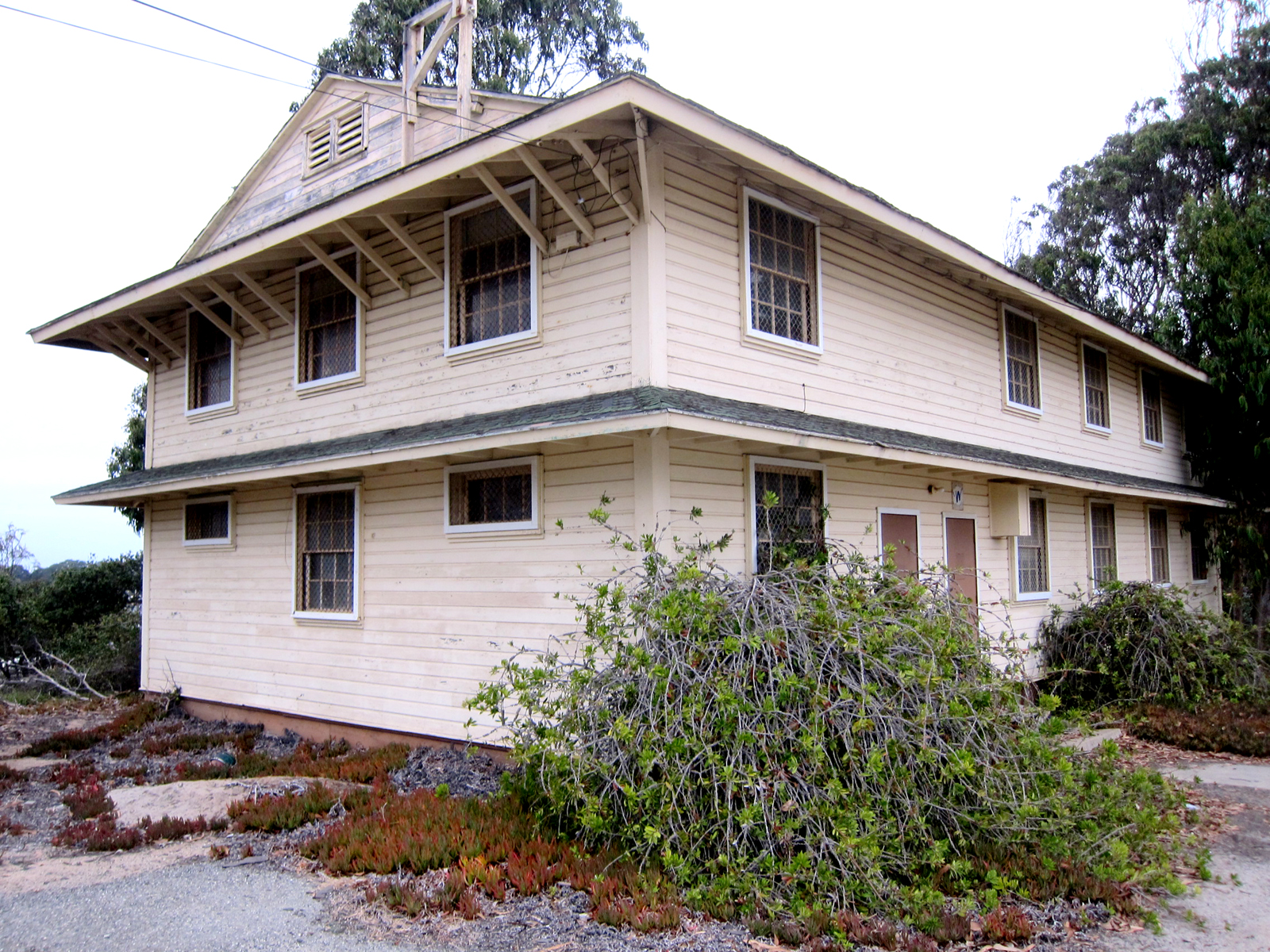
Fort Ord Station Veterinary Hospital, 2014 photo

The Fort Ord Station Veterinary Hospital (SVH) at the Marina Equestrian Center Park in Marina was placed on the National Register of Historic Places in 2014, by the Friends of the Fort Ord Warhorse. This is the first such designation on Fort Ord. The history is detailed at the Fort Ord Equestrian Center. The Fort Ord SVH was built for the Army Veterinary Corps as an equine veterinary hospital in 1941 to serve the 1400 horses of the 76th Field Artillery Regiment, cavalry, and quartermaster mule-train units. This is the only remaining example of a major World War II-construction medical facility for warhorses. Twelve of the original twenty-one World War II stables for the horses and mules were about 200 yards away, on Fourth Avenue and General Jim Moore Boulevard, but were demolished by CSUMB in 2011.

=== Stilwell Hall ===
Stilwell Hall was an immense, 52,000-square-foot (4,800 m^{2}) building that stood on a precipice at the edge of the Pacific across from the former Fort Ord military installation.

The building was constructed between November 1940 and September 1943 under the initiative of General Joseph W. Stilwell. It served as a recreational facility for military members for just over fifty years before Fort Ord was closed in 1994. Abandoned, Stilwell Hall fell into disrepair and was torn down in 2003 after severe coastal erosion threatened to cause the structure, filled with asbestos and lead paint, to collapse into the Monterey Bay National Marine Sanctuary.

=== American football ===
The Fort Ord Army Warriors, an American football team of players from Fort Ord, defeated the Quantico Marines Devil Dogs in the December 1953 edition of the Poinsettia Bowl, an armed forces football championship game held several times in the early 1950s. Ollie Matson and Dave Mann each scored two touchdowns for Fort Ord.

== Notable people ==
- Nick Bacon, (Basic Training 1963) Medal of Honor recipient for actions in the Vietnam War.
- Jerry Bird, skydiver, at Fort Ord in 1963.
- Nick Bockwinkel (stationed at Fort Ord 1958–1960), professional wrestler.
- Major General Paul W. Brier, former Commanding General of 4th Marine Division, U.S. Marine Corps Forces Europe, and U.S. Marine Corps Forces Africa. Born on Ft. Ord in September 1959.
- Michelle Boulos, nationally competitive figure skater.
- Grey DeLisle, voice actress.
- Joe DiMaggio, professional baseball player.
- Clint Eastwood (swimming pool lifeguard), actor and director; later became a restaurateur and mayor in nearby Carmel.
- Herm Edwards, NFL player and coach; his father was stationed at Ford Ord.
- Jamie Farr, actor.
- Jerry Garcia, musician and co-founder of the Grateful Dead.
- Jimi Hendrix, musician; was at Fort Ord in May 1961 for basic training.
- David Janssen, actor.
- Cindy K. Jorgenson, District Judge of the United States District Court for the District of Arizona.
- James Lofton, professional football player, coach, and commentator, born at Fort Ord in 1956.
- Ollie Matson, Pro Football Hall of Fame football player, Olympic medal winner.
- Scott Melville, professional tennis player.
- Martin Milner, actor on Route 66 and Adam-12.
- Lieutenant General Harold G. Moore, author, and former commander of Fort Ord.
- Matthew Morrison, actor and singer.
- Lennie Niehaus, jazz musician, film and television composer
- Leonard Nimoy, actor, producer, singer and director.
- General Raymond T. Odierno, former battalion commander and formerly Army Chief of Staff.
- Jaina Lee Ortiz, actor and dancer.
- Alan Osmond, singer, musician, performer and leader of The Osmonds.
- Ken Osmond, police officer, actor on Leave It to Beaver.
- Steve Owens, Heisman Trophy winner, 1969.
- Blake Percival, whistleblower.
- John M. Perkins, Christian minister and civil rights activist.
- Wally Rank, professional basketball player.
- Ron Rivera, head coach of the NFL's Carolina Panthers and Washington Commanders
- Sapphire, author.
- John Saxon, actor.
- General Joseph Stilwell, World War II commander.
- Major General Charles H. Swannack, Jr., battalion commander who went on to command the 82nd Airborne Division.
- Brigadier General Huba Wass de Czege, one of the Army's leading strategists in the 1980s.
- Jan-Michael Vincent, actor, received basic training as a helicopter mechanic in 1967.

== In popular culture ==
- The 1951 film The Lady Says No with David Niven was filmed at Fort Ord.
- The 1956 film The Girl He Left Behind with Tab Hunter and Natalie Wood was filmed at Fort Ord.
- The 1963 film Soldier in the Rain with Jackie Gleason and Steve McQueen was also filmed at Fort Ord.
- The 1980 film Private Benjamin featured a photo of moored yachts at Fort Ord during a recruitment scene being used as an inducement.
- The television series MythBusters frequently used the streets of an abandoned housing development in Fort Ord for testing that involves driving a car.
- Fort Ord is the location of Dave Egger's 2014 novel Your Fathers, Where Are They?.
- Mariposa Military Base from the action-roleplaying video game series Fallout is based on Fort Ord.

== See also ==
- Fort Ord Army Airfield
- Rancho Laguna Seca
- California during World War II
- List of national monuments of the United States
