= Nik Bonitto =

American football player (born 1999)

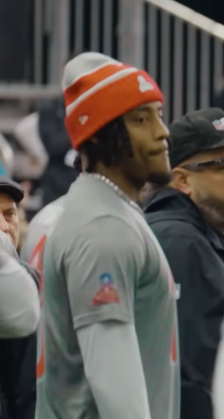
- Bonitto at the 2026 Pro Bowl Games

No. 15 – Denver Broncos
- Position: Outside linebacker
- Roster status: Active

Personal information
- Born: September 26, 1999 (age 27); Fort Lauderdale, Florida, U.S.
- Listed height: 6 ft 3 in (1.91 m)
- Listed weight: 240 lb (109 kg)

Career information
- High school: St. Thomas Aquinas (Fort Lauderdale)
- College: Oklahoma (2018–2021)
- NFL draft: 2022: 2nd round, 64th overall pick

Career history
- Denver Broncos (2022–present)

Awards and highlights
- Second-team All-Pro (2024); 2× Pro Bowl (2024, 2025); Hispanic Pro Football Player of the Year (2025); Second-team All-American (2020); Third-team All-American (2021); 2× Second-team All-Big 12 (2020, 2021)

Career NFL statistics as of Week 1, 2026
- Total tackles: 140
- Sacks: 37
- Forced fumbles: 6
- Fumble recoveries: 1
- Pass deflections: 7
- Interceptions: 1
- Defensive touchdowns: 2
- Stats at Pro Football Reference

Nikolas Bonitto (bo-NEE-toe; born September 26, 1999) is an American professional football outside linebacker for the Denver Broncos of the National Football League (NFL). He played college football for the Oklahoma Sooners.

== Early life ==
Bonitto grew up in Fort Lauderdale, Florida and attended St. Thomas Aquinas High School. He was named an Under Armour All-American as a senior. Bonitto was rated a four-star recruit and committed to play college football at Oklahoma over offers from Texas and Louisville.

== College career ==
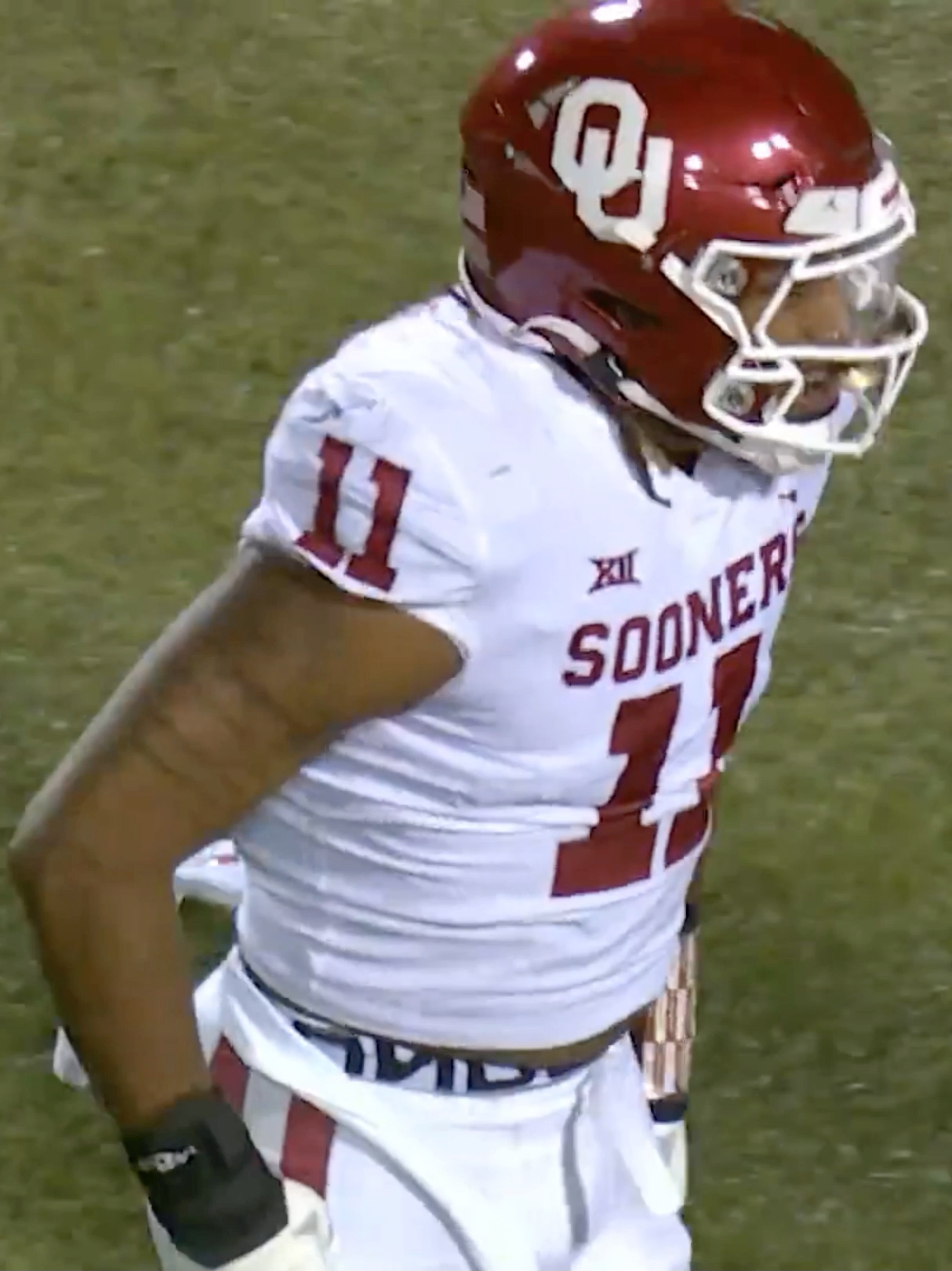
Bonitto with the Oklahoma Sooners in 2021

Bonitto played in three games as a true freshman before using a redshirt on the season. He became a starter at outside linebacker six games into his redshirt freshman season and finished the year with 43 tackles, 6.5 tackles for loss and 3.5 sacks. As a redshirt sophomore, he recorded 29 tackles with ten tackles for loss and 7.5 sacks and was named a second-team All-American by the Associated Press. Bonitto repeated as a second-team All-Big 12 selection after finishing his redshirt junior season with 39 total tackles, 15 tackles for loss, 7 sacks and one forced fumble. Following the conclusion of the regular season, he announced his decision to forgo his redshirt senior season and enter the 2022 NFL draft as well as opt out of the 2021 Alamo Bowl.

== Professional career ==
Pre-draft measurables
Height	Weight	Arm length	Hand span	Wingspan	40-yard dash	10-yard split	20-yard split	20-yard shuttle	Three-cone drill	Vertical jump	Broad jump	Bench press
6 ft 3 in (1.91 m)	248 lb (112 kg)	32 1/2 in (0.83 m)	9 3/8 in (0.24 m)	6 ft 6 3/4 in (2.00 m)	4.54 s	1.61 s	2.63 s	4.23 s	7.04 s	35.5 in (0.90 m)	10 ft 0 in (3.05 m)	22 reps
All values from NFL Combine/Pro Day

=== 2022 season ===
Bonitto was selected by the Denver Broncos with the 64th pick in the second round of the 2022 NFL draft. The Broncos used the selection previously obtained from the Los Angeles Rams in a trade for Von Miller.

=== 2023 season ===
After starting the 2023 season as a backup, Bonitto started over Randy Gregory in the Week 4 matchup against the Chicago Bears. He recorded 2.5 sacks and a forced fumble that led to a scoop and score by Jonathon Cooper in the game. Gregory was traded soon after and Bonitto was named the starter.

=== 2024 season ===
During the 2024 season, Bonitto became the first Broncos player to have double digit sacks since Von Miller and Bradley Chubb in 2018. In Week 13 on Monday Night Football against the Cleveland Browns, Bonitto intercepted a pass from Jameis Winston, returning it 70 yards for his first career touchdown. Then two weeks later, Bonitto scored his second touchdown of the season on a 50-yard return against the Indianapolis Colts when he intercepted a backwards pass during a trick play. He finished the season with 13.5 sacks and as a result he made his first Pro Bowl appearance and made the 2nd team All-Pro.

Bonitto was ranked 38th by his fellow NFL players on the Top 100 Players of 2025, his first appearance on the list.

=== 2025 season ===
On September 4, 2025, Bonitto signed a four-year, $106 million extension (up to $120 million if incentives are met) with the Broncos, making him the highest-paid non-quarterback in Broncos history.

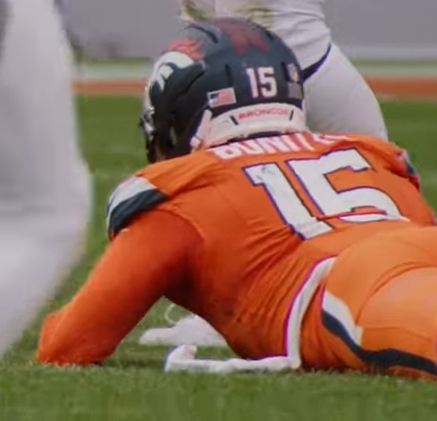
Bonitto with the Denver Broncos in 2025

After recording 2.5 sacks in a Week 5 victory against the Philadelphia Eagles, Bonitto was named AFC Defensive Player of the Week. In Week 13 against the Washington Commanders, Bonitto swatted away Marcus Mariota's two-point conversion pass attempt in overtime, which would've won Washington the game, to seal a 27–26 Broncos overtime victory. Bonitto helped the Broncos defense become one of the league's top units during the 2025 season, contributing to a league-leading 68 sacks with his own 14.0 on the season. In the Divisional Round against the Buffalo Bills, Bonitto recorded 3 tackles (2 solo, 1 combined) and two forced fumbles, one of which, a strip sack on quarterback Josh Allen.

Bonitto was ranked 32nd by his fellow NFL players on the NFL Top 100 Players of 2026.

== Career statistics ==
Legend
**Bold**	Career high

=== NFL ===
==== Regular season ====
Year	Team	Games		Tackles					Fumbles				Interceptions			
Year	Team	GP	GS	Cmb	Solo	Ast	Sck	TFL	FF	FR	Yds	TD	PD	Int	Yds	TD
2022	DEN	15	1	14	6	8	1.5	1	1	0	0	0	0	0	0	0
2023	DEN	15	4	30	23	7	8.0	13	1	0	0	0	2	0	0	0
2024	DEN	17	15	**48**	**33**	**15**	13.5	**16**	**2**	**1**	**50**	**1**	**4**	**1**	**71**	**1**
2025	DEN	17	16	46	31	**15**	**14.0**	14	**2**	0	0	0	1	0	0	0
Career		64	36	138	93	45	37.0	44	6	1	50	1	7	1	71	1

==== Postseason ====
Year	Team	Games		Tackles					Fumbles				Interceptions			
Year	Team	GP	GS	Cmb	Solo	Ast	Sck	TFL	FF	FR	Yds	TD	PD	Int	Yds	TD
2024	DEN	1	1	**4**	**2**	**2**	0.0	0	0	0	0	0	0	0	0	0
2025	DEN	2	2	3	**2**	1	**1.0**	**1**	**2**	0	0	0	0	0	0	0
Career		3	3	7	4	3	1.0	1	2	0	0	0	0	0	0	0

=== College ===
Year	Team	GP	Tackles					Interceptions					Fumbles			
Year	Team	GP	Cmb	Solo	Ast	Sck	TFL	Int	Yds	Avg	TD	PD	FF	FR	Yds	TD
2018	Oklahoma	4	3	2	1	0.0	0.0	0	0	—	0	0	0	0	0	0
2019	Oklahoma	14	**43**	**25**	**18**	3.5	6.5	**1**	0	0.0	0	**4**	0	0	0	0
2020	Oklahoma	10	32	18	14	**8.0**	10.5	0	0	—	0	2	0	0	0	0
2021	Oklahoma	12	39	23	16	7.0	**15.0**	0	0	—	0	1	**1**	**3**	**70**	0
Career		40	117	68	49	18.5	32.0	1	0	0.0	0	7	1	3	70	0

== Personal life ==
Bonitto is of Cuban, Jamaican and Haitian descent. On February 4, 2026, Bonitto was named the inaugural Hispanic Professional Football Player of the Year by the Hispanic Football Hall of Fame.

Bonitto is also an investor in USL Championship soccer club OKC Energy.
