= Pebble Beach Road Races =

Coordinates: 36.5744°N 121.9546°W

The Pebble Beach Road Races were a series of sports car racing events in Pebble Beach, California, from 1950 through 1956. The "Del Monte Trophy" was held on the twisty, leafy, and very narrow town roads the town. The races were managed under the auspices of the Sports Car Club of America (SCCA), as were most races from that day to this. The route was originally 1.8 miles (2.9 km) long, but was lengthened from 1951 onwards to 2.1 miles (3.4 km).

The search for an appropriate route for the race began at the famous 17 Mile Drive but that later proved unsuitable. After evaluating several alternatives, a collection of roads near the Lodge at Pebble Beach was chosen, partly for its location and partly because it was short enough and tight enough that it wouldn't overtax some of the small cars of the day.

Not all of the "track" was paved; the original 1950 route consisted of both paved two-lane roads and sections of dirt or loose gravel. Races started along Portola Road near the present-day Pebble Beach Equestrian Center. Cars then turned right onto Sombria Lane, then right again onto Drake Road. In 1950, drivers would turn right once again onto Forest Lake Road; in 1951 and later years they turned left onto Alvarado Lane (now Stevenson Drive), then sharp right onto Forest Lake. The final corner was a sharp right-hander at Ondulado back onto Portola and past the start/finish line.

Although the course was always tight and twisty with tall Cypress trees hemming in the track on either side, accidents were scarce and relatively uneventful. The exception came in 1956 when Ernie McAfee (no relation to fellow racer Jack McAfee) fatally slammed his Ferrari into a tree. This spelled the end of the popular Pebble Beach Road Races, although it was the genesis of Laguna Seca Raceway, its modern-day successor.

The Pebble Beach Road Race course has been recreated in a computer game, Grand Prix Legends.
