= Fort Ord Army Airfield =

Former U.S. Army Airfield

- Monterey Bay area, California
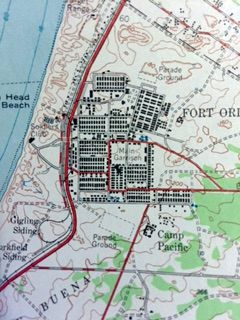
- Map of Fort Ord and Fort Ord Army Airfield, labeled Parade Ground below runway from 1947

Site information
- Type: Army Air Force Airfield
- Controlled by: United States Army

Location
- Coordinates: 36.65°N 121.807°W

Site history
- Built: 1940
- In use: 1940-1964
- Battles/wars: None

Garrison information
- Current commander: None; post closed in 1964

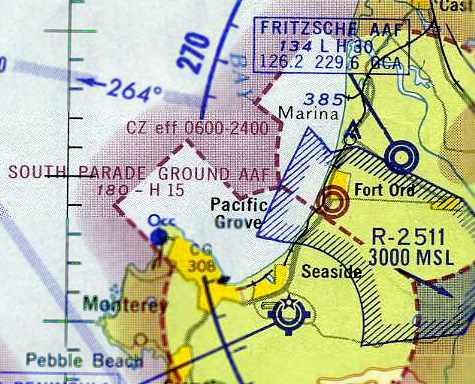
Fort Ord Army Airfield and Fritzsche AAF on a FAA map from 1963

Fort Ord Army Airfield, later renamed South Parade Ground Army Airfield is a former United States Army Air Force airfield built for World War II, located at Fort Ord. Fort Ord was an Army Base founded in 1917 on Monterey Bay of the Pacific Ocean coast in California. Fort Ord closed in 1994 by the Base Realignment and Closure act and is now the Fort Ord National Monument. In 1940 a 1,500-foot hard-surface runway was built at the Fort, just south of the main base. The single wide runway ran west/east and was later also used as a Parade Ground. In 1958 a new and larger Army airfield was built to support Fort Ord, the Fritzsche AAF. Fritzsche AAF was located northeast of Fort Ord Army Airfield. When Fritzsche AAF opened, the Fort Ord Army Airfield was renamed South Parade Ground Army Airfield. Fritzsche AAF replaced Fort Ord Army Airfield and Fort Ord Army Airfield was closed and abandoned in 1964. Fritzsche AAF later became the Marina Municipal Airport in 1994. When the South Parade Ground Army Airfield closed in 1964 it became the South Parade Ground. The South Parade Ground hangars became the base's motor pool. The motor pool/hangars were removed in 2006 and the site is now California State University, Monterey Bay softball field and parking lot. The runways was located just west of General Jim Moore Boulevard and just north of Lightfighter Drive in Seaside, California, just south of Marina, California. Just to the east of Fort Ord Army Airfield was Camp Pacific a camp for Works Progress Administration construction crews from 1938 to 1942.

== See also ==
- California during World War II
- Rancho Laguna Seca
