= Ron Rivera =

American football player, coach, and executive (born 1962)

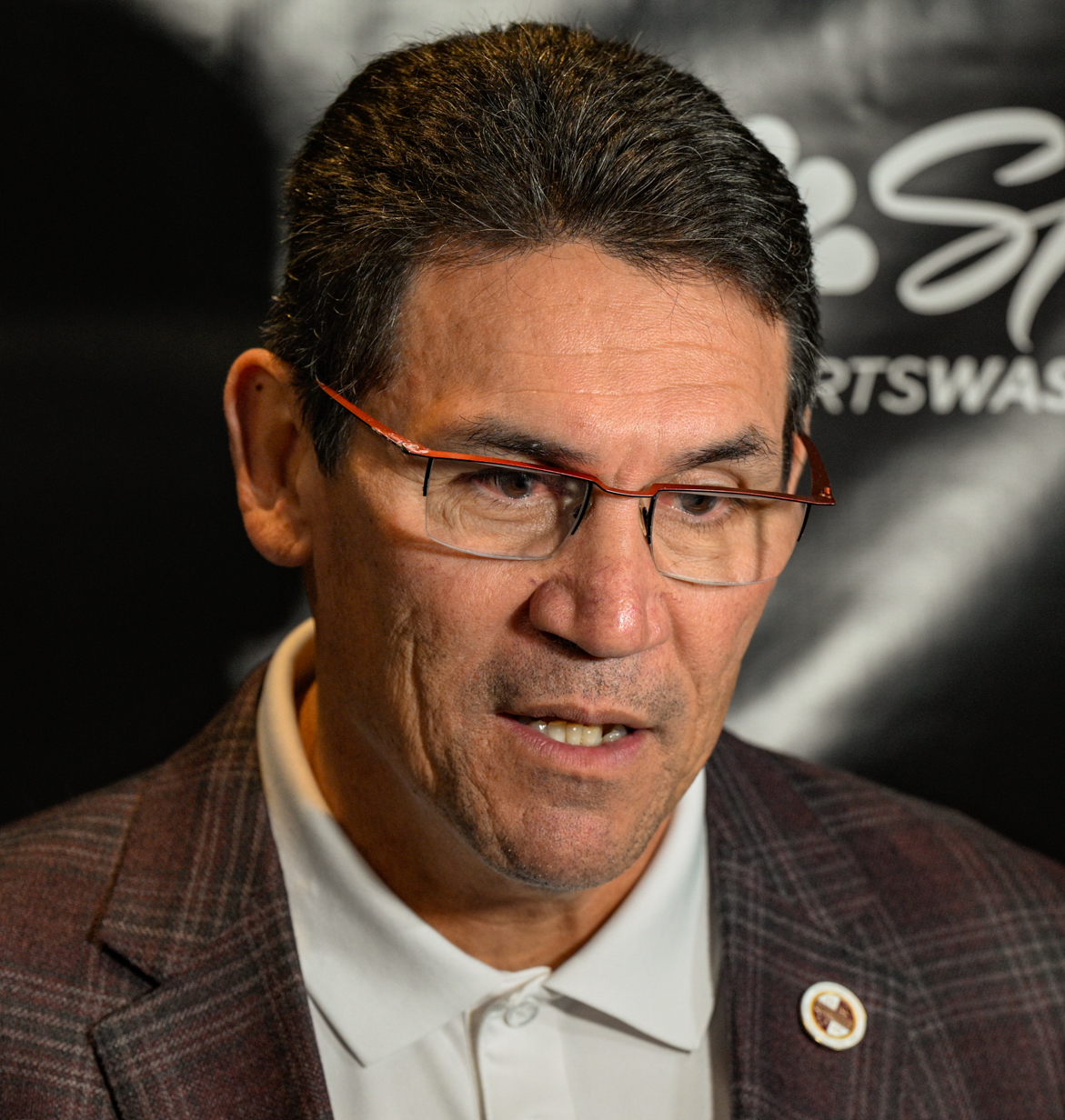
- Rivera in 2022

California Golden Bears
- Title: General manager

Personal information
- Born: January 7, 1962 (age 64); Fort Ord, California, U.S.
- Listed height: 6 ft 3 in (1.91 m)
- Listed weight: 235 lb (107 kg)

Career information
- Position: Linebacker (No. 59)
- High school: Seaside (Seaside, California)
- College: California (1980–1983)
- NFL draft: 1984: 2nd round, 44th overall pick

Career history

Playing
- Chicago Bears (1984–1992)

Coaching
- Chicago Bears (1997–1998) Defensive quality control coach; Philadelphia Eagles (1999–2003) Linebackers coach; Chicago Bears (2004–2006) Defensive coordinator; San Diego Chargers (2007) Linebackers coach; San Diego Chargers (2008–2010) Defensive coordinator; Carolina Panthers (2011–2019) Head coach; Washington Redskins / Football Team / Commanders (2020–2023) Head coach

Operations
- California (2025–present) General manager

Awards and highlights
- Playing: Super Bowl champion (XX); Pop Warner Trophy (1983); Pac-10 Defensive Player of the Year (1983); Consensus All-American (1983); First-team All-Pac-10 (1983); 2× second-team All-Pac-10 (1981, 1982); Coaching: 2× NFL Coach of the Year (2013, 2015); Greasy Neale Award (2015); George Halas Award (2022); PFWA Assistant Coach of the Year (2005); Panthers wins leader (76)

Career NFL statistics
- Sacks: 7.5
- Interceptions: 9
- Fumble recoveries: 6
- Touchdowns: 1
- Stats at Pro Football Reference

Head coaching record
- Regular season: 102–103–2 (.498)
- Postseason: 3–5 (.375)
- Career: 105–108–2 (.493)
- Coaching profile at Pro Football Reference

Ronald Eugene Rivera (born January 7, 1962) is an American professional football executive and former linebacker and coach who is the general manager for the University of California–Berkeley, his alma mater. He played nine seasons in the National Football League (NFL) for the Chicago Bears and was a member of their 1985 team that won Super Bowl XX. Rivera later served as the head coach of the NFL's Carolina Panthers and Washington Football Team / Commanders, earning two NFL Coach of the Year awards with the former.

Rivera played college football for the Golden Bears, earning consensus All-American honors in 1983. He was selected by the Chicago Bears in the second round of the 1984 NFL draft. Rivera began his coaching career in 1997, serving as the defensive quality control coach for the Bears. He joined the Philadelphia Eagles as a linebackers coach two years later before rejoining the Bears as their defensive coordinator in 2004. The following year, Rivera was named Assistant Coach of the Year by the PFWA and helped coach linebacker Brian Urlacher into being named Defensive Player of the Year. After the Bears made an appearance in Super Bowl XLI, he joined the San Diego Chargers as their linebackers coach in 2007 before being promoted to defensive coordinator a year later.

After three years with the Chargers, Rivera was hired as head coach for the Panthers. He led them to an appearance in Super Bowl 50 and became their all-time leader in wins. Rivera was fired near the end of the 2019 season and became Washington's head coach in 2020. He was diagnosed with squamous cell carcinoma the same year but was considered cancer free by early 2021. Rivera is the only coach in NFL history to have led a team with a losing record to the playoffs more than once, doing so with Carolina in 2014 and Washington in 2020. He was fired by Washington after the 2023 season and worked as an analyst for NFL Live before rejoining the Golden Bears in an administrative role in 2025.

== Early life ==
Rivera was born on January 7, 1962, in Fort Ord, California. His father, Eugenio, was a Puerto Rican commissioned officer in the US Army stationed in California. There, Eugenio met his future wife, Dolores, who is of Mexican and Filipino descent. The family moved often due to Eugenio's military service, with Rivera being educated on bases in Germany, Panama, and Washington, D.C. The family eventually settled in Marina, California, where he played football at Seaside High School before graduating in 1980.

== Playing career ==
=== College ===
Rivera was granted a football scholarship at the University of California, Berkeley, where he led the Golden Bears in tackles as a linebacker during his three years there. As a senior, Rivera received several awards and honors for his performance, including being named a consensus All-American, Pac-10 Football Defensive Player of the Year along with Arizona linebacker Ricky Hunley, the Pop Warner Trophy, and was named MVP of the East–West Shrine Game.

=== Professional ===
Rivera was selected in the second round of the 1984 NFL draft by the Chicago Bears, playing for them as a rotational linebacker and special teamer.

In 1985, Rivera became the first American of Puerto Rican descent to win a Super Bowl when the Bears defeated the New England Patriots in Super Bowl XX.

Rivera was named the team's Man of the Year in 1988 and was named their Ed Block Courage Award recipient the following year.

Rivera played in nine seasons before retiring after the 1992 season, recording 392 tackles, 7.5 sacks, five forced fumbles, six fumble recoveries, and nine interceptions in 137 games and 62 starts.

== Coaching career ==
In 1993, Rivera went to work for WGN-TV and SportsChannel Chicago as a television analyst covering the Bears and college football. Four years later, he joined the Bears as a defensive quality control coach.

=== Philadelphia Eagles (1999–2003) ===
In 1999, Rivera was named linebackers coach for the Philadelphia Eagles under newly hired head coach Andy Reid. During his tenure, the Eagles advanced to the NFC Championship Game for three consecutive seasons. Rivera also was credited with developing linebacker Jeremiah Trotter into a two-time All-Pro.

=== Chicago Bears (2004–2006) ===
Rivera was named defensive coordinator of the Chicago Bears on January 23, 2004. In 2005, the Bears defense was rated second in the league by total yardage, with the team winning the NFC North division with an 11–5 record before losing in the Divisional Round to the Carolina Panthers. For his efforts that year, Rivera was named Assistant Coach of the Year by the Pro Football Writers Association. In 2006, the Bears had the league's third-ranked defense in terms of points allowed, which helped them advance to Super Bowl XLI. Although the Bears lost to the Indianapolis Colts 29–17, the defense's success earned Rivera recognition among franchises looking for new head coaches.

In February 2007, it was announced that Rivera's contract with the Bears would not be extended due to failed negotiations. Around the same time, he interviewed for several vacant head coaching positions around the league, including with the Pittsburgh Steelers and Dallas Cowboys.

=== San Diego Chargers (2007–2010) ===
Rivera was hired by the San Diego Chargers to become their inside linebackers coach in February 2007 and was promoted to defensive coordinator after the team fired Ted Cottrell in October 2008.

=== Carolina Panthers (2011–2019) ===
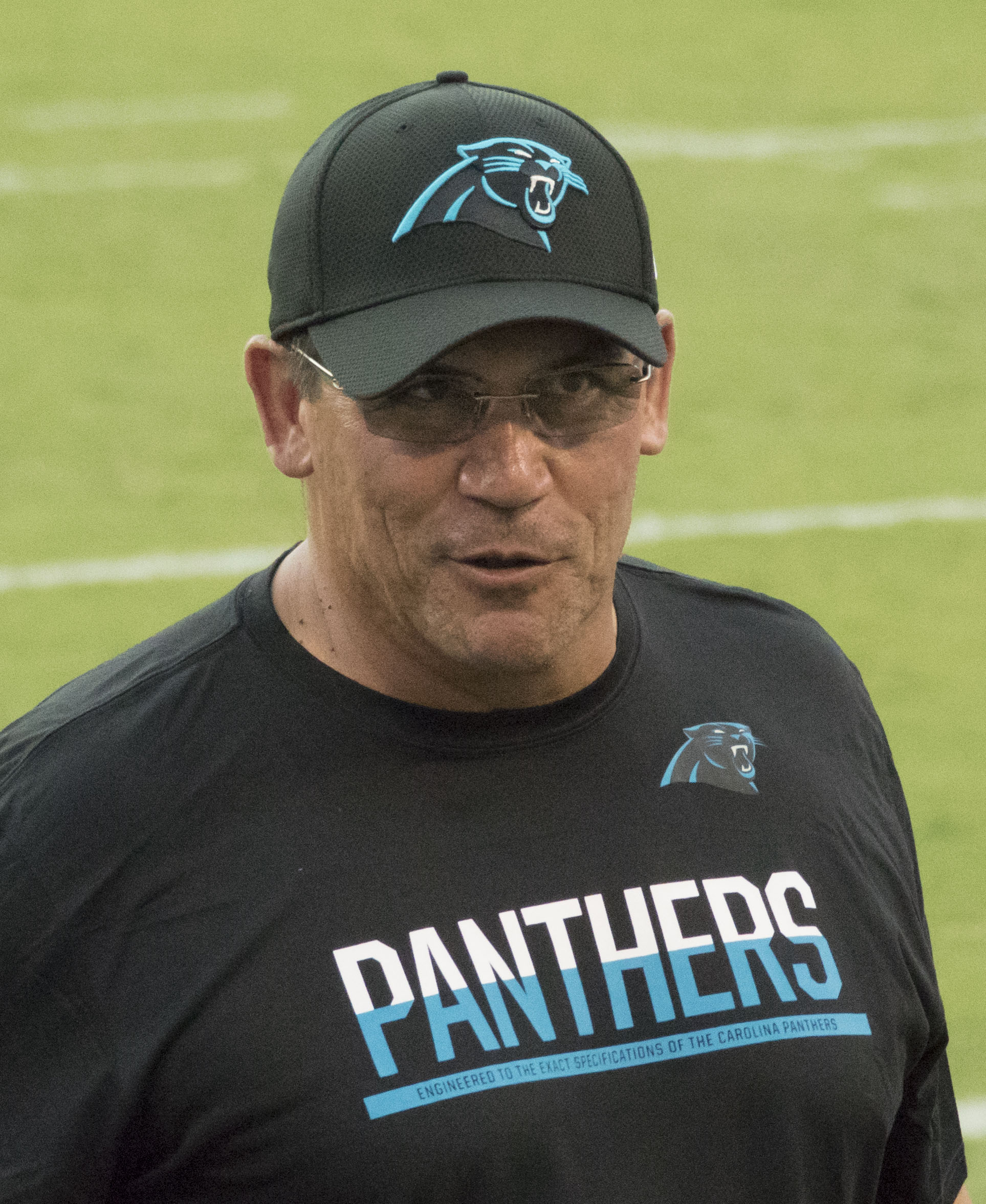
Rivera in 2016

On January 11, 2011, Rivera was hired to become the fourth head coach of the Carolina Panthers. He was the third Latino in NFL history to become a head coach, following Tom Fears and Tom Flores. During his first year, the Panthers went 6–10 and finished third in the NFC South.

In 2012, the Panthers finished 7–9 and finished second in the NFC South. During his first two years with the Panthers, Rivera was known for his conservative decision-making, with journalists noting his record of 2–14 record in games decided by less than a touchdown.

Following a 1–3 start to the 2013 season, reports suggested that the Panthers were already contemplating getting a new head coach. As a result, Rivera began making more aggressive decisions. The Panthers then went 11–1 to finish the season, including a then-franchise record eight-game winning streak, to win the NFC South with a 12–4 record and make the playoffs for the first time since 2008. For his efforts, Rivera was honored as the 2013 AP NFL Coach of the Year. During the early part of the 2013 season, Rivera was given the nickname of "Riverboat Ron" by fans and the media after taking several risky decisions, something previously not attributed to him. The name was inspired after 19th century frontier gamblers, with Rivera later embracing it for use on his social media profiles. Rivera was also known as "Chico" during his playing time with the Chicago Bears, a common practice that the team had under head coach Mike Ditka. Rivera received the nickname from defensive coordinator Buddy Ryan, who reminded him of actor Freddie Prinze from the television series Chico and the Man. The Panthers earned a first-round bye in the playoffs, but lost to the San Francisco 49ers in the Divisional Round by a score of 23–10.

In 2014, the Panthers recovered from a 3–8–1 start to win its final four regular-season games and clinch the NFC South for the second consecutive year. They defeated the Arizona Cardinals 27–16 in the Wild Card Round for the team's first playoff win since 2005 before falling to the eventual NFC champion Seattle Seahawks on the road 31–17 the following week.

The team's momentum would continue in 2015, as the Panthers produced their best season in franchise history by finishing 15–1, with their only loss being against the Atlanta Falcons on the road in Week 16. Rivera was recognized as the 2015 AP NFL Coach of the Year, his second such honor. The team held the top seed in the NFC playoffs, where they defeated the Seahawks 31–24 during the Divisional Round and the Arizona Cardinals 49–15 in the NFC Championship Game, advancing to Super Bowl 50 against the Denver Broncos. It was the first Super Bowl in which both head coaches, Rivera and the Broncos' Gary Kubiak, had previously played in a Super Bowl. The Panthers lost by a score of 24–10, in a game which both sides' defenses dominated.

The Panthers struggled in 2016, finishing 6–10 and did not qualify for the playoffs for the first time in four seasons. The Panthers improved in 2017 and finished with an 11–5 record, entering the playoffs, but they lost on the road in the Wild Card Round 31–26 to the New Orleans Saints. Rivera signed a two-year contract extension worth US$15.5 million in January 2018. The Panthers finished 7–9 in the 2018 season and missed the playoffs despite starting with a 6–2 record.

After a 5–7 start to the 2019 season, Rivera was fired on December 3, 2019, after nine seasons as head coach. Owner David Tepper, who bought the team in 2018, made the decision to move on from Rivera as he wanted to build his own approach for the team. Rivera finished his career with the Panthers with four playoff appearances and a total record of 79–67–1 (.541), both of which rank first all-time in team history.

=== Washington Redskins / Football Team / Commanders (2020–2023) ===
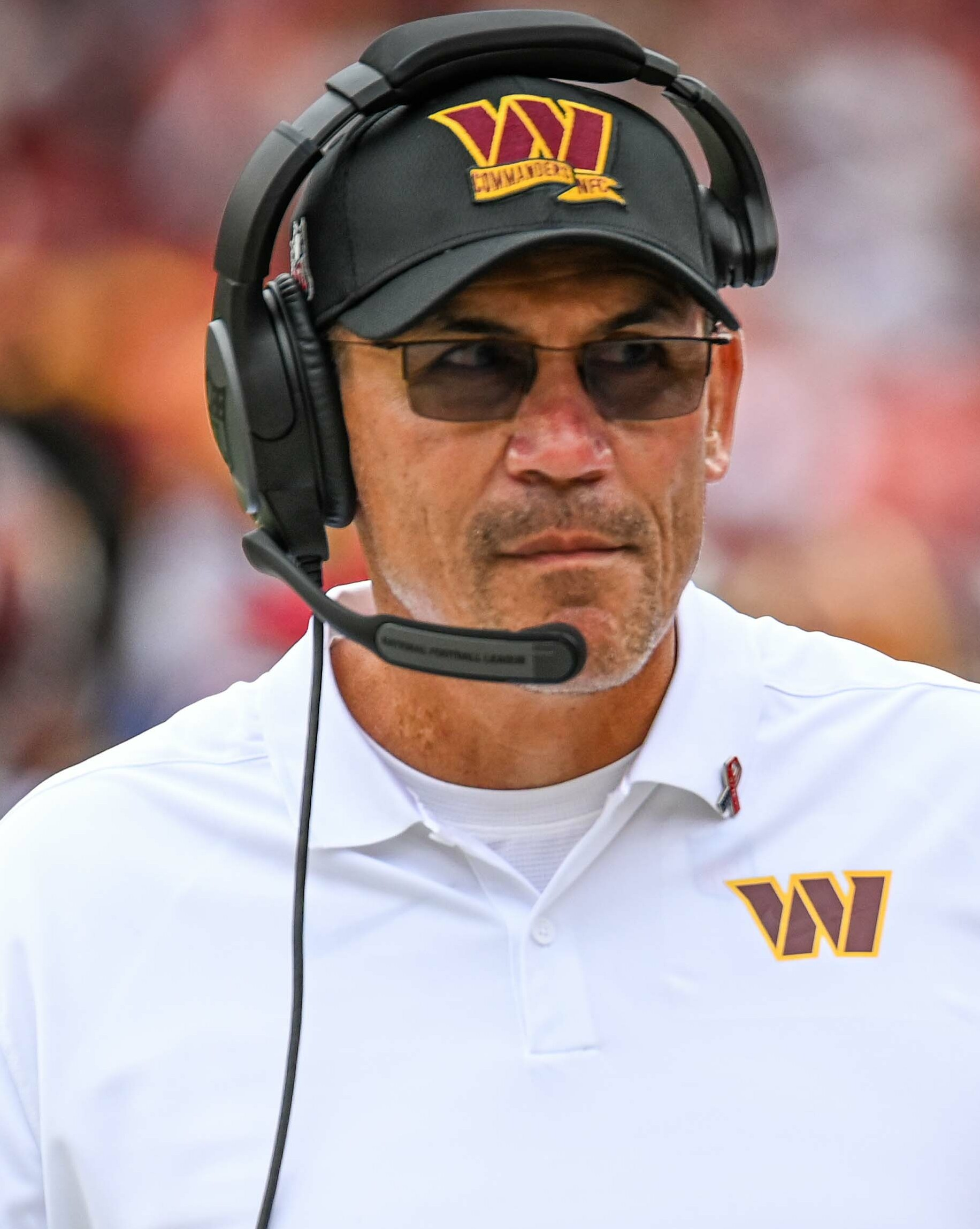
Rivera in 2022

On January 1, 2020, Rivera was hired to become the 30th head coach of the Washington Football Team, known as the Redskins at his time of hiring. At his introductory press conference, Rivera stated that he was convinced that the team was the right fit for him after having meetings with then-Washington owner Daniel Snyder and former head coach Joe Gibbs, which started almost immediately after he was fired from the Panthers. Rivera hired several former assistant coaches that worked under him with the Panthers, assigning Scott Turner, the son of Norv Turner, as offensive coordinator and former Jacksonville Jaguars and Oakland Raiders head coach Jack Del Rio as defensive coordinator. Rivera was also granted considerable authority over roster personnel, with him acting as the team's de facto general manager until the team hired Martin Mayhew for the role in 2021. However, Rivera retained the final say in football matters. For instance, Mayhew reported to him; most NFL head coaches report to the general manager.

Rivera's first season with the team was met with many challenges, including implementing a new culture, assisting the process of changing the team's name, dealing with a vastly altered season due to the COVID-19 pandemic, and being diagnosed with cancer and undergoing treatment for it during the season. Rivera released quarterback Dwayne Haskins in December after on-field struggles and off-the-field controversies throughout the year. Despite all the adversities, Rivera led the team to a NFC East title with a 7–9 record, mirroring his 2014 Panthers team that also won the division with a losing record.

In the 2021 offseason, Rivera chose to bring in journeyman quarterback Ryan Fitzpatrick and made him the starting quarterback over Taylor Heinicke despite showing a lack of understanding of the offense during the preseason. Fitzpatrick was injured in the first game of regular season, which resulted in Heinicke being the starter for the rest of the season with a final record of 7–10 and third in the NFC East.

During the 2022 offseason, Carson Wentz was traded to the team with Rivera publicly stating that he was directly responsible for the move in order for Wentz to be his new starting quarterback. Following Week 6 and a 2–4 record, Rivera named Heinicke as his starter again due to Wentz being placed on injured reserve. Despite Heinicke managing to keep the Commanders in playoff contention with five wins, three losses, and a tie, and needing to win the last two remaining games of the regular season in order to make the playoffs, Rivera benched him in favor of Wentz ahead of Week 17. The Commanders lost to the Cleveland Browns in Week 17, and Rivera was widely criticized for his post-game interview where he showed a lack of awareness that a Vikings loss to the Packers would result in the Commanders being eliminated from playoff contention. The team finished the season last in the NFC East with an 8–8–1 record.

Rivera replaced Scott Turner with former Kansas City Chiefs offensive coordinator Eric Bieniemy in 2023, additionally giving him the title of assistant head coach. For the 2023 season, Rivera announced that Sam Howell would be the team's starting quarterback. Rivera took over as interim defensive coordinator for the second half of the season after Jack Del Rio was fired following a 45–10 road loss to the Dallas Cowboys on Thanksgiving, with the team having allowed the most points in the NFL by that point in the season. The Commanders were eliminated from playoff contention following a Week 15 loss to the Los Angeles Rams. After the Commanders finished the 2023 season last in the NFC East with a 4–13 record, Rivera was fired on January 8, 2024.

== Administrative career ==
=== California Golden Bears (2025–present) ===
On March 20, 2025, Rivera was announced as the general manager of his alma mater, California, with oversight over their budget and football staff. Rivera's contract runs through 2028, with his compensation funded entirely by donors.

== Head coaching record ==
Team	Year	Regular season					Postseason			
Team	Year	Won	Lost	Ties	Win %	Finish	Won	Lost	Win %	Result
CAR	2011	6	10	0	.375	3rd in NFC South	—	—	—	—
CAR	2012	7	9	0	.438	2nd in NFC South	—	—	—	—
CAR	2013	12	4	0	.750	1st in NFC South	0	1	.000	Lost to San Francisco 49ers (Divisional Round)
CAR	2014	7	8	1	.469	1st in NFC South	1	1	.500	Lost to Seattle Seahawks (Divisional Round)
CAR	2015	15	1	0	.938	1st in NFC South	2	1	.667	Lost to Denver Broncos (Super Bowl 50)
CAR	2016	6	10	0	.375	4th in NFC South	—	—	—	—
CAR	2017	11	5	0	.688	2nd in NFC South	0	1	.000	Lost to New Orleans Saints (Wild Card Round)
CAR	2018	7	9	0	.438	3rd in NFC South	—	—	—	—
CAR	2019	5	7	0	.417	Fired	—	—	—	—
CAR total		76	63	1	.546	—	3	4	.429	—
WAS	2020	7	9	0	.438	1st in NFC East	0	1	.000	Lost to Tampa Bay Buccaneers (Wild Card Round)
WAS	2021	7	10	0	.412	3rd in NFC East	—	—	—	—
WAS	2022	8	8	1	.500	4th in NFC East	—	—	—	—
WAS	2023	4	13	0	.235	4th in NFC East	—	—	—	—
WAS total		26	40	1	.396	—	0	1	.000	—
Total		102	103	2	.498	—	3	5	.375	—

== Personal life ==
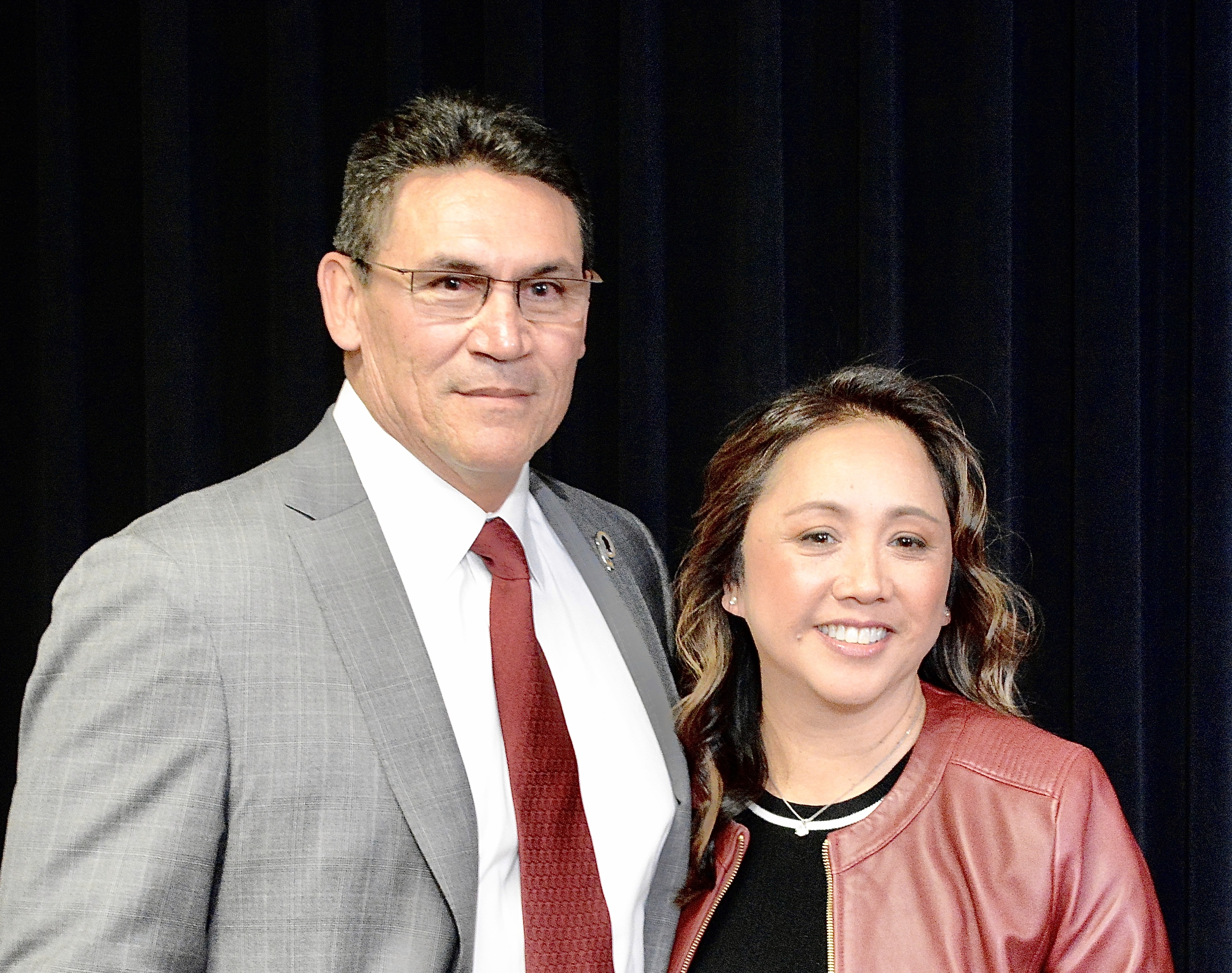
Rivera and his wife Stephanie in 2020

Rivera is Catholic and has three brothers: Steven, Mickey, and John. He is married to Stephanie (née Tamayo), whom he met while at Cal in August 1983. They married in 1984. Stephanie, a Filipino American, was a point guard for the Golden Bears women's basketball team in the early 1980s and later served as a coach for the sport, most notably as an assistant for the Washington Mystics of the WNBA in 2000. The couple have two children: Christopher and Courtney. Courtney played for the UCLA Bruins softball team in the early 2010s and has worked as a social media producer under Rivera in Carolina and Washington. Rivera's nephew, Vincent, was hired as a defensive quality control coach under him in Washington in 2020.

Rivera's idol while growing up was Puerto Rican baseball player Roberto Clemente, who died in a plane crash while en route to deliver aid to victims of the 1972 Nicaragua earthquake. Rivera was inducted into the California Athletics Hall of Fame in 1994. On January 5, 2015, his home in Charlotte, North Carolina caught fire and was partially damaged, but Rivera and his family escaped without injury. Rivera held a charity yard sale there after his hiring as Washington head coach in 2020, with various Panthers apparel and merchandise up for sale that raised more than US$30,000 for the humane society of Charlotte.

In August 2020, Rivera was diagnosed with squamous cell carcinoma in a lymph node of his neck. Rivera has a family history with cancer; his father Eugenio was diagnosed with it while his brother Mickey died from pancreatic cancer in 2015 and his mother Dolores died from lung cancer seven years later. However, Rivera's diagnosis was discovered in its early stage. He underwent a seven-week treatment regimen that included 35 proton therapy appointments and three cycles of chemotherapy. Although Rivera missed only a total of three practices, he lost over 30 pounds (14 kg) and had to receive intravenous therapy during halftime of some games to relieve fatigue. A campaign known as "Rivera Strong" was organized by the team to support Rivera. He was considered cancer free by late January 2021. In April 2021, Rivera donated $100,000 to Rich Eisen's Run Rich Run charity event for St. Jude Children's Research Hospital. He was later awarded the 2022 George Halas Award by the Pro Football Writers of America for the adversity he dealt with.

In April 2022, Rivera joined the Washington Speakers Bureau as a speaker. In 2024, Rivera worked as an analyst for NFL Live on ESPN and select games for Westwood One.

Rivera was a founding board member of the Hispanic Football Hall of Fame in 2025, alongside Anthony Muñoz.
