= List of California Golden Bears starting quarterbacks =

The following individuals have started in games at the quarterback position for the California Golden Bears football team, updated from 1961 through week 3 of 2025.

Year	Name	Class	Number of Games	Notes
2025	Jaron-Keawe Sagapolutele	Fr.	11	
2024	Chandler Rogers	Sr.	1	
2024	C. J. Harris	Sr.	1	
2024	Fernando Mendoza	So.	11	
2023	Fernando Mendoza	Fr.	8	
2023	Sam Jackson V	So.	3	
2023	Ben Finley	So.	2	
2022	Jack Plummer	Sr.	12	
2021	Ryan Glover	Sr.	1	
2021	Chase Garbers	Sr.	11	
2020	Chase Garbers	Jr.	4	
2019	Spencer Brasch	Fr.	1	
2019	Devon Modster	Jr.	3	
2019	Chase Garbers	So.	9	Redbox Bowl Offensive MVP
2018	Chase Garbers	Fr.	10	
2018	Brandon McIlwain	So.	2	
2018	Ross Bowers	Jr.	1	
2017	Ross Bowers	So.	12	
2016	Davis Webb	Sr.	12	
2015	Jared Goff	Jr.	13	No. 1 overall NFL draft pick (2016); All-Pac-12 First Team; Armed Forces Bowl Offensive MVP
2014	Jared Goff	So.	12	
2013	Jared Goff	Fr.	12	
2012	Allan Bridgford	Jr.	3	
2012	Zach Maynard	Sr.	9	
2011	Zach Maynard	Jr.	13	
2010	Brock Mansion	Jr.	4	
2010	Kevin Riley	Sr.	8	
2009	Kevin Riley	Jr.	13	
2008	Kevin Riley	So.	9	
2008	Nate Longshore	Sr.	4	
2007	Kevin Riley	Fr.	1	Armed Forces Bowl MVP
2007	Nate Longshore	Jr.	12	
2006	Nate Longshore	So.	13	Holiday Bowl Co-Offensive MVP
2005	Steve Levy	Jr.	2	
2005	Joe Ayoob	Jr.	11	
2004	Aaron Rodgers	Jr.	12	All-Pac-10 First Team
2003	Aaron Rodgers	So.	13	Insight Bowl MVP
2002	Kyle Boller	Sr.	12	
2001	Kyle Boller	Jr.	10	
2000	Kyle Boller	So.	11	
1999	Kyle Boller	Fr.	10	
1998	Justin Vedder		11	
1997	Justin Vedder		11	
1996	Pat Barnes		12	
1995	Pat Barnes		11	
1994	Dave Barr		11	
1993	Dave Barr		13	
1992	Dave Barr		11	
1991	Mike Pawlawski		11	Citrus Bowl MVP, PAC-10 co-Offensive Player of the Year, All PAC-10
1990	Mike Pawlawski		11	
1989	Troy Taylor		11	
1988	Troy Taylor		11	
1987	Troy Taylor		11	
1986	Troy Taylor		11	
1985	Kevin Brown		11	
1984	Gale Gilbert		11	
1983	Gale Gilbert		11	
1982	Gale Gilbert		11	
1981	J Torchio		11	
1980	Rich Campbell		11	
1979	Rich Campbell		11	
1978	Rich Campbell		11	
1977	Charlie Young		11	
1976	Joe Roth		11	
1975	Joe Roth		8	
1975	Fred Besana		3	
1974	Steve Bartkowski		11	No. 1 overall NFL draft pick (1975); Consensus All-American (1974)
1973	Vince Ferragamo		11	
1972	Steve Bartkowski		11	
1972	Jay Cruze		11	
1971	Jay Cruze		11	
1970	Dave Penhall		11	
1969	Dave Penhall		11	
1968	Randy Humpries		11	
1967	Barry Bronk		11	
1966	Barry Bronk		11	
1966	Dan Berry		11	
1965	Dan Berry		11	
1965	Jim Hunt		11	
1964	Craig Morton		11	
1963	Craig Morton		11	
1962	Craig Morton		11	
1961	Randy Gold		11	
1958	Joe Kapp			
1922	Charles F. Erb			
1921	Charles F. Erb			
1920	Charles F. Erb			
