= Quality control coach =

Coaching staff member of a gridiron football team

A quality control coach is a member of the coaching staff of a gridiron football team whose primary job is preparing the team for a game, beginning sometimes two or three weeks before the actual game. Their primary duties include preparing for the game by analyzing game film for statistical analysis.

Quality control coach is typically an entry-level position for National Football League (NFL) coaches before moving on to positional jobs and coordinator positions. Several head coaches, such as Jon Gruden, Ron Rivera, and Robert Saleh began their coaching career in quality control. The first full-time female coach in NFL history, Kathryn Smith, was hired as a quality control coach by the Buffalo Bills in 2016.

There are three different types of quality control teams: offensive, defensive, and special teams. Offensive quality control will chart the upcoming teams' defense for various down and distance situations, field positions and how many times they use particular personnel groupings. Defensive quality control will do similar analysis of the offense. Special teams quality control will figure out what players are used in various special situations such as kickoff and punt.
