= Hispanic Football Hall of Fame =

- Established: September 17, 2025
- Type: Hall of fame
- Founders: Anthony Muñoz & Ron Rivera
- Website: www.hispanicfootball.org

The Hispanic Football Hall of Fame (HFHOF) is a hall of fame that honors the greatest players, coaches, and contributors of Hispanic descent in the sport of American football, from the high school to professional levels. It was established in 2025 by former National Football League (NFL) players Anthony Muñoz and Ron Rivera.

== History ==
On September 17, 2025, the Hispanic Football Hall of Fame was announced by Pro Football Hall of Fame member Anthony Muñoz and two-time NFL Coach of the Year Ron Rivera. The pair served as founding board members, while the selection committee includes NFL Network vice president Sandy Núñez, Judy Battista, Rolando Cantú, Paul Gutierrez, Brandon Huffman, Moisés Linares, Alex Marvez, Armando Salguero, and John Sutcliffe. Along with inductees into the hall, awards will be handed out for Professional, College, and High School Player of the Year. It operates as a 501(c)(3) organization.

"Football has always been a sport that unites people from all backgrounds," said Rivera, who is of Puerto Rican descent. "The Hispanic Football Hall of Fame gives us an opportunity to tell the stories of incredible people who not only achieved greatness on the field but also opened doors and inspired countless young people in our communities." Muñoz, who is of Mexican descent, stated that he was "proud to help create a platform that recognizes Hispanic excellence in football and encourages future generations to chase their dreams, knowing that their heritage is a strength and part of what makes the game so powerful."

In October 2025, the HFHOF announced the inaugural watchlist for the Hispanic College Football Player of the Year award:

- Joey Aguilar, QB (Tennessee)
- Micah Bañuelos, OL (USC)
- Fernando Carmona, OL (Arkansas)
- Kevin Concepcion, WR (Texas A&M)
- Josh Cuevas, TE (Alabama)
- Jesús Gómez, K (Arizona State)
- Tyler Martinez, LB (New Mexico State)
- Fernando Mendoza, QB (Indiana)
- Parker Navarro, QB (Ohio)
- Diego Pavia, QB (Vanderbilt)
- Trebor Peña, WR (Penn State)
- Gabriel Plascencia, K (San Diego State)
- Jacob Rodriguez, LB (Texas Tech)
- Tony Rojas, LB (Penn State)
- Gabriel Rubio, DL (Notre Dame)

In December 2025, Fernando Mendoza of the Indiana Hoosiers was named the inaugural winner of the award.

In February 2026, the inaugural inductees into the Hispanic Football Hall of Fame were announced. The class of 2026 comprised Tom Fears, Tom Flores, Ted Hendricks, Anthony Muñoz, Jim Plunkett, Ron Rivera, and Steve Van Buren.

== Hispanic Football Player of the Year ==
The Hispanic Football Player of the Year Award is given annually by the Hispanic Football Hall of Fame to the most outstanding player of Hispanic descent at the high school, college, and professional levels of American football. The award was established in 2025.

=== Professional ===
List of Hispanic Pro Football Player of the Year winners
| Year | Player | Position | Team | Ref |
|---|---|---|---|---|
| 2025 | Nik Bonitto | Linebacker | Denver Broncos | |

=== College ===
List of Hispanic College Football Player of the Year winners
| Year | Player | Position | School | Ref |
|---|---|---|---|---|
| 2025 | Fernando Mendoza | Quarterback | Indiana | |

=== High school ===
List of Hispanic High School Football Player of the Year winners
| Year | Player | Position | School | Ref |
|---|---|---|---|---|
| 2025 | Ryan Estrada | Running back | El Dorado (Texas) | |

== Inductees ==
| Class | Inductee | Heritage |
|---|---|---|
| 2026 | Tom Fears | Mexico |
| 2026 | Tom Flores | Mexico |
| 2026 | Ted Hendricks | Guatemala |
| 2026 | Anthony Muñoz | Mexico |
| 2026 | Jim Plunkett | Mexico |
| 2026 | Ron Rivera | Puerto Rico / Mexico |
| 2026 | Steve Van Buren | Honduras |
