= Fernando Mendoza =

American football player (born 2003)

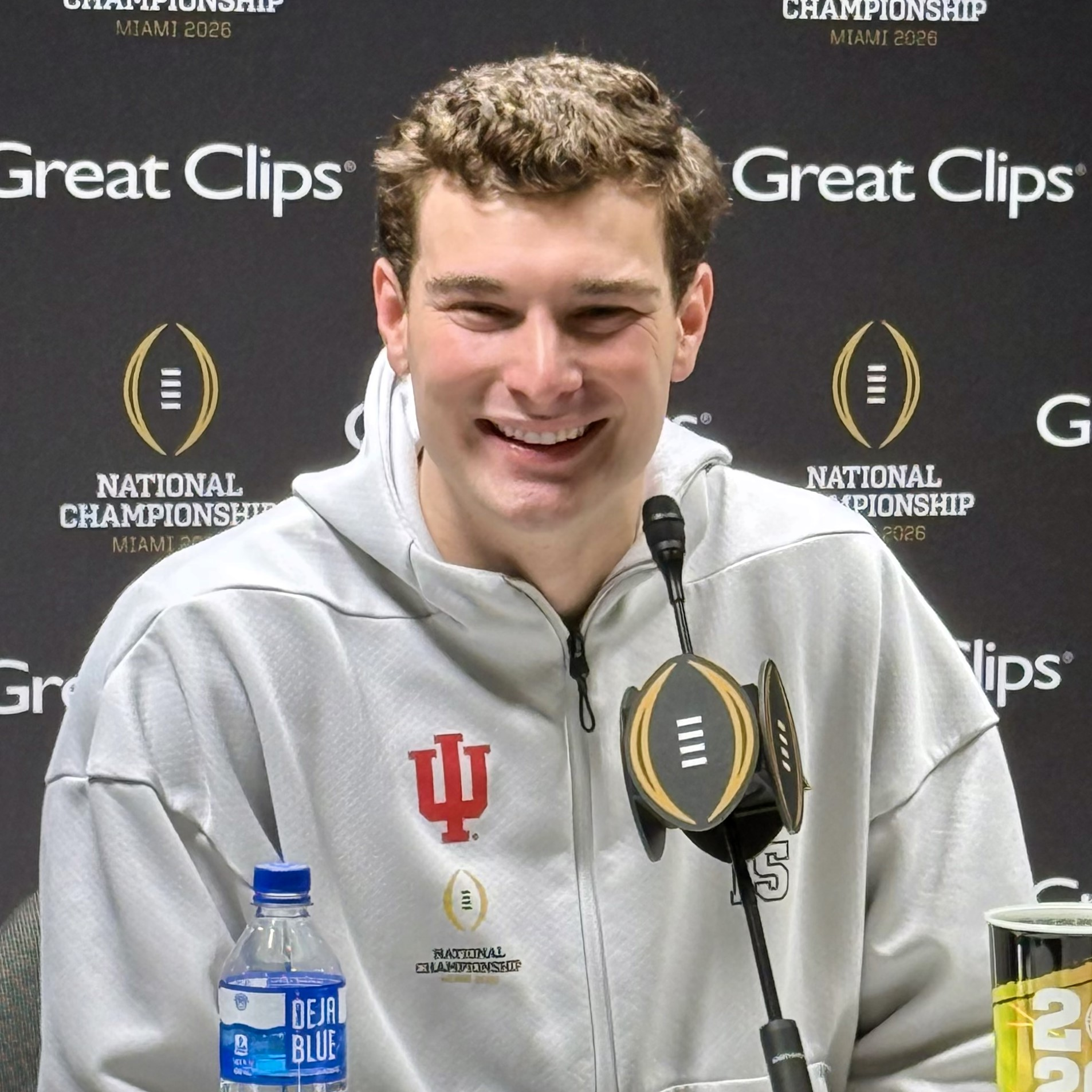
- Mendoza with the Indiana Hoosiers in 2026

No. 15 – Las Vegas Raiders
- Position: Quarterback
- Roster status: Active

Personal information
- Born: October 1, 2003 (age 23); Boston, Massachusetts, U.S.
- Listed height: 6 ft 5 in (1.96 m)
- Listed weight: 225 lb (102 kg)

Career information
- High school: Christopher Columbus (Miami, Florida)
- College: California (2022–2024); Indiana (2025)
- NFL draft: 2026: 1st round, 1st overall pick

Career history
- Las Vegas Raiders (2026–present)

Awards and highlights
- CFP national champion (2025); CFP National Championship Game Offensive MVP (2025); Heisman Trophy (2025)

Career NFL statistics as of Week 10, 2026
- Passing attempts: 37
- Passing completions: 23
- Completion percentage: 62.2%
- TD–INT: 0–0
- Passing yards: 191
- Passer rating: 75.4
- Rushing yards: 25
- Rushing touchdowns: 1
- Stats at Pro Football Reference

Fernando Gabriel Mendoza V (born October 1, 2003) is an American professional football quarterback for the Las Vegas Raiders of the National Football League (NFL). Mendoza played college football for the California Golden Bears of the University of California, Berkeley for three seasons before transferring to the Indiana Hoosiers in 2025, where he won the Heisman Trophy and the 2026 national championship. He was selected by the Raiders first overall in the 2026 NFL draft.

== Early life ==
Fernando Gabriel Mendoza V was born on October 1, 2003, in Boston, Massachusetts, to Elsa Espino and Fernando G. Mendoza IV, who was completing his medical residency at the time. He has two younger brothers, Alberto and Maximo. His family is of Cuban descent; all four of his grandparents were born and raised in Cuba before emigrating to Miami, Florida, in 1960 following the Cuban Revolution. Mendoza is a descendant of Don Antonio Ysidoro González de Mendoza Bonilla (1828–1906), a prominent lawyer of Spanish descent who served as the first president of the Supreme Court of Cuba.

Mendoza was raised in Miami and attended Christopher Columbus High School in the Miami-Dade County community of Westchester. Growing up, he considered Tom Brady to be his football idol. As his high school team's starting quarterback across two seasons, Mendoza completed 133 of 203 pass attempts for 1,396 yards and 16 touchdowns with four interceptions, while also rushing for 137 yards and a touchdown on the ground. During his senior year in 2021, he led Columbus to an 11–3 record and a berth in the state semifinals against Venice High School in the FHSAA Class 8A football playoffs.

== College career ==
=== California ===
==== 2022 season ====
Mendoza initially committed to play college football for the Yale Bulldogs in 2021. In February 2022, however, he signed with the California Golden Bears of the University of California, Berkeley. Mendoza redshirted during the 2022 season.

==== 2023 season ====
Mendoza earned his first career start for California in week six of the 2023 season against Oregon State. He completed 21 of 32 pass attempts for 207 yards and two touchdowns with an interception in a loss to the Beavers. A week later, he was 10 of 17 passing for 149 yards, two touchdowns and an interception in a loss to Utah. Mendoza was named the team's starting quarterback heading forward. In eight starts as a redshirt freshman, he completed 63 percent of his passes for 1,708 yards and 14 touchdowns, leading the Golden Bears to a 6–7 record and an Independence Bowl appearance against Texas Tech.

==== 2024 season ====
Entering the 2024 season, Mendoza won the starting quarterback job, beating graduate transfer Chandler Rogers. In week two against Auburn, Mendoza completed 25 of 36 passes for 233 yards and two touchdowns, leading the Bears to an upset win over the Tigers. Mendoza was named ACC quarterback of the week in back-to-back games against Oregon State and Wake Forest, setting career highs in passing yards and completions. His 56 passing attempts against Wake Forest were the most by a California quarterback since 2016. On December 11, 2024, Mendoza announced he would be entering the NCAA transfer portal. In 2025, he graduated with a Bachelor of Science in Business Administration from Berkeley's Haas School of Business.

=== Indiana ===
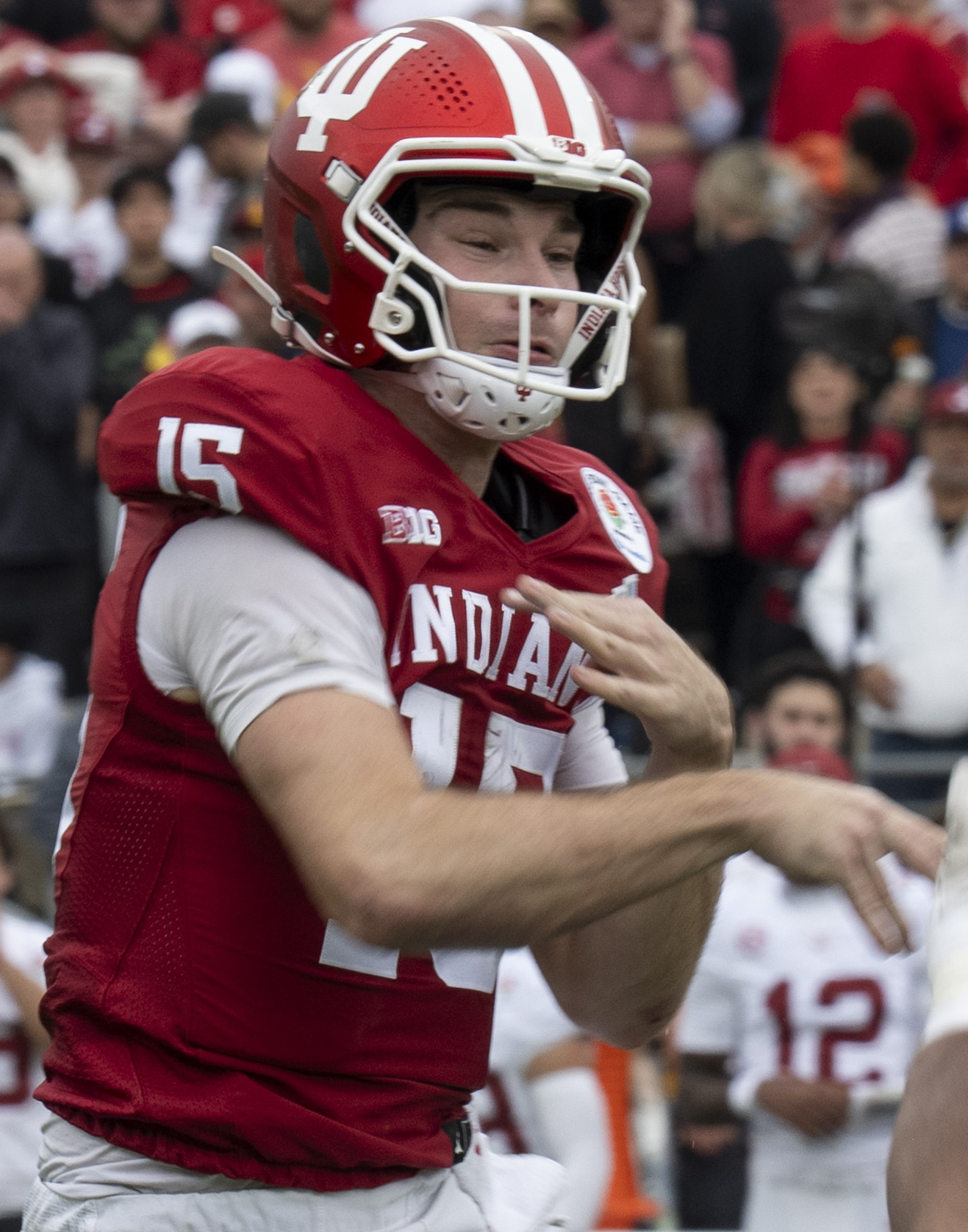
Mendoza playing in the 2026 Rose Bowl with the Indiana Hoosiers

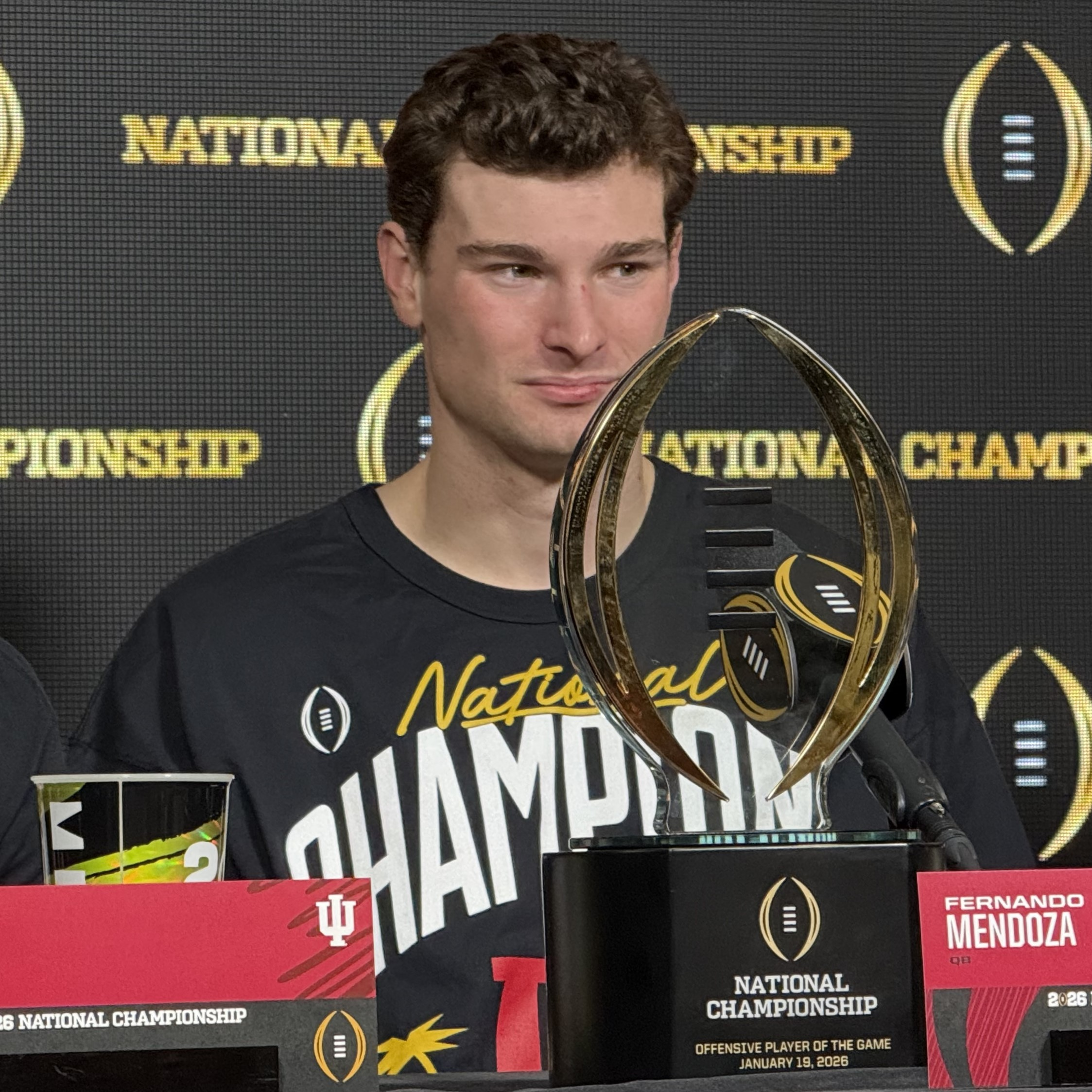
Mendoza following the 2026 CFP championship

On December 23, 2024, Mendoza announced that he would transfer to Indiana University Bloomington to play for the Hoosiers. At Indiana, he pursued a Master of Business Administration (MBA) degree at the Kelley School of Business.

==== 2025 season ====
In the 2025 season opener against the Old Dominion Monarchs, Mendoza completed 18 of 31 passes for 193 yards and scored a touchdown on a five-yard rush as Indiana won 27–14. He completed 18 of 25 passes for 245 yards and four touchdowns against the Kennesaw State Owls, leading the Hoosiers to a 56–9 win. Against the Indiana State Sycamores, Mendoza completed 19 of 20 passes for 270 yards and five touchdowns, and ran for an additional touchdown in a 73–0 win; he did not return to the game after halftime.

Mendoza threw for a career-high five passing touchdowns against the No. 9 Illinois Fighting Illini on 21 of 23 passing with 267 yards. In a 20–15 win against the Iowa Hawkeyes, Mendoza completed 13 of 23 passes for 233 yards, two touchdowns, and one interception. He completed 20 of 31 passes for 215 yards, one touchdown, and one interception in a 30–20 upset win on the road against the No. 3 Oregon Ducks. Mendoza threw for a season-high 332 yards on 24 of 28 passing while defeating the Michigan State Spartans 38–13. He led the Hoosiers to a 56–6 win against the UCLA Bruins, completing 15 of 22 passes for 168 yards, three touchdowns, and one interception, adding a rushing touchdown; he left the game in the third quarter. Mendoza completed 14 of 21 passes for 201 yards, one touchdown, and one interception, with one rushing touchdown, as the Hoosiers defeated the Maryland Terrapins, 55–10.

In a 27–24 road win against the Penn State Nittany Lions, Mendoza completed 19 of 30 passes for 218 yards, one touchdown, and one interception, adding a rushing touchdown; the passing touchdown, to wide receiver Omar Cooper Jr., came in the final moments of the game to take the lead and was widely described as "a Heisman moment". Against the Wisconsin Badgers, he threw his 30th touchdown pass of the season, eclipsing the Indiana single-season program record set by Kurtis Rourke the previous season; Mendoza finished the game 22 of 24 passing for 299 yards and four touchdowns in a 31–7 win. In the final game of the regular season, the Old Oaken Bucket rivalry game against the Purdue Boilermakers, Mendoza completed 8 of 15 passes for 177 yards and two touchdowns, with one rushing touchdown, before leaving the game in the third quarter; Indiana won 56–3 to seal the program's first perfect regular season in the coldest game ever played at Ross-Ade Stadium.

In the 2025 Big Ten Championship Game against the No. 1 Ohio State Buckeyes, Mendoza threw for 222 yards and a touchdown, leading Indiana to a 13–10 victory and their first Big Ten title since 1967. He was named the game's MVP for his performance. Mendoza led Indiana to its first bowl game win since 1991, defeating the No. 9 Alabama Crimson Tide 38–3 in the 2026 Rose Bowl; he completed 14 of 16 passes for 192 yards and three touchdowns. Mendoza completed 17 of 20 passes for 177 yards and five touchdowns while defeating Oregon 56–22 in the 2026 Peach Bowl. In the 2026 College Football Playoff National Championship against the Miami Hurricanes, he completed 16 passes for 186 yards while also rushing for a 12-yard touchdown, leading the Hoosiers to a 27–21 victory and the school's first-ever national title. For his performance, Mendoza received the Offensive Player of the Game award.

For the 2025 season, Mendoza was named the AP College Football Player of the Year, the winner of the Chicago Tribune Silver Football, and the Walter Camp Award. He was also the winner of both the Maxwell Award and the Davey O'Brien Award. He was also named Big Ten Offensive Player of the Year, Big Ten Quarterback of the Year, and first-team All-Big Ten. He was announced to be one of the four Heisman Trophy finalists, along with Ohio State quarterback Julian Sayin, Vanderbilt quarterback Diego Pavia, and Notre Dame running back Jeremiyah Love, ultimately being named the recipient of the award. Mendoza became the first player in Indiana school history to win the Heisman Trophy. After the season, he announced he would forego his final year of NCAA eligibility and declare for the 2026 NFL draft.

== Professional career ==
=== NFL draft ===
Pre-draft measurables
Height	Weight	Arm length	Hand span	Wingspan
6 ft 4 3/4 in (1.95 m)	236 lb (107 kg)	31 7/8 in (0.81 m)	9 1/2 in (0.24 m)	6 ft 4 3/4 in (1.95 m)
All values from NFL Combine

With his collegiate successes, Mendoza was considered the best quarterback in the 2026 NFL draft and the expected first overall selection; New York Jets writer Eric Allen, whose team drafted second overall, quipped "Mendoza likely won't be an option when the Green & White go on the clock". His physique, intelligence, and accuracy when throwing were praised by scouts, though questions surrounded the latter when forced to improvise under pressure or scrambling. Draft analysts compared his profile to quarterbacks like former top picks Jared Goff and Joe Burrow.

Mendoza was selected by the Las Vegas Raiders with the first pick.

=== Las Vegas Raiders ===
After being drafted, Mendoza chose to wear No. 15. It was the same number as Raider legend quarterback and coach Tom Flores, and he received Flores's blessing to do so. On July 23, Mendoza signed his rookie contract worth $57.27 million fully guaranteed.

==== 2026 season ====
Mendoza made his professional debut on August 13, 2026, during the first preseason game against the Arizona Cardinals, where he completed 10 of 16 passes for 97 yards and a touchdown. He began his rookie season as the backup quarterback to Kirk Cousins.

Mendoza made his first regular season appearance during Week 5 against the New England Patriots, where he completed 6 out of 8 passes for 48 yards as the Raiders lost 17–45.

After Cousins was traded to the Minnesota Vikings on November 10, Mendoza was named the Raiders' starting quarterback. His first start came against the defending Super Bowl champion Seattle Seahawks, running for a ten-yard touchdown on his first drive before the offense faltered in the second half; he ended the 13–21 loss with 17 of 29 passes completed for 143 yards along with six carries for 22 yards and the touchdown. With playing the Denver Broncos the next week in his second start, Mendoza became the first quarterback in NFL history in which his first two career starts were against the previous season’s number-one seeds.

== Career statistics ==
=== NFL ===
Year	Team	Games			Passing										Rushing					Sacked		Fumbles	
Year	Team	GP	GS	Record	Cmp	Att	Pct	Yds	Y/A	Y/G	Lng	TD	Int	Rtg	Att	Yds	Y/A	Lng	TD	Sck	SckY	Fum	Lost
2026	LV	2	1	0–1	23	37	62.2	191	5.2	95.5	22	0	0	75.4	7	25	3.6	10	1	6	45	0	0
Career		2	1	0–1	23	37	62.2	191	5.2	95.5	22	0	0	75.4	7	25	3.6	10	1	6	45	0	0

=== College ===
Legend
	Heisman Trophy
	Won the CFP National Championship
	NCAA record
	Led the NCAA
**Bold**	Career high

Season	Team	Games			Passing								Rushing			
Season	Team	GP	GS	Record	Cmp	Att	Pct	Yds	Y/A	TD	Int	Rtg	Att	Yds	Avg	TD
2022	California	Redshirt														
2023	California	9	8	3−5	153	243	63.0	1,708	7.0	14	**10**	132.8	48	92	1.9	2
2024	California	11	11	6−5	265	**386**	68.7	3,004	7.8	16	6	144.6	87	105	1.2	2
2025	Indiana	16	16	**16−0**	**273**	379	**72.0**	**3,535**	**9.3**	**41**	6	**182.9**	**90**	**276**	**3.1**	**7**
Career		36	35	25−10	691	1,008	68.6	8,247	8.2	71	22	156.2	225	473	2.1	11

== Career highlights ==
College

- CFP national champion (2025)
- CFP National Championship Game Offensive MVP (2025)
- Heisman Trophy (2025)
- Walter Camp Award (2025)
- Maxwell Award (2025)
- AP College Football Player of the Year (2025)
- Hispanic College Football Player of the Year (2025)
- Davey O'Brien Award (2025)
- Manning Award (2025)
- Consensus All-American (2025)
- Big Ten Male Athlete of the Year (2026)
- Big Ten Most Valuable Player (2025)
- First-team All-Big Ten (2025)
- Big Ten Championship Game MVP (2025)
- Best Male College Athlete ESPY Award (2026)

== Personal life ==
Mendoza is a devout Roman Catholic. He has spoken publicly about his faith and incorporates daily Mass into his game-day routine. While at Indiana, he also helped organize team Bible studies on campus and has credited his faith with fostering camaraderie among his teammates.

Mendoza's younger brother, Alberto, was the backup quarterback for the Indiana Hoosiers during Mendoza's tenure; he transferred to the Georgia Tech Yellow Jackets in January 2026.

=== Cultural identity ===
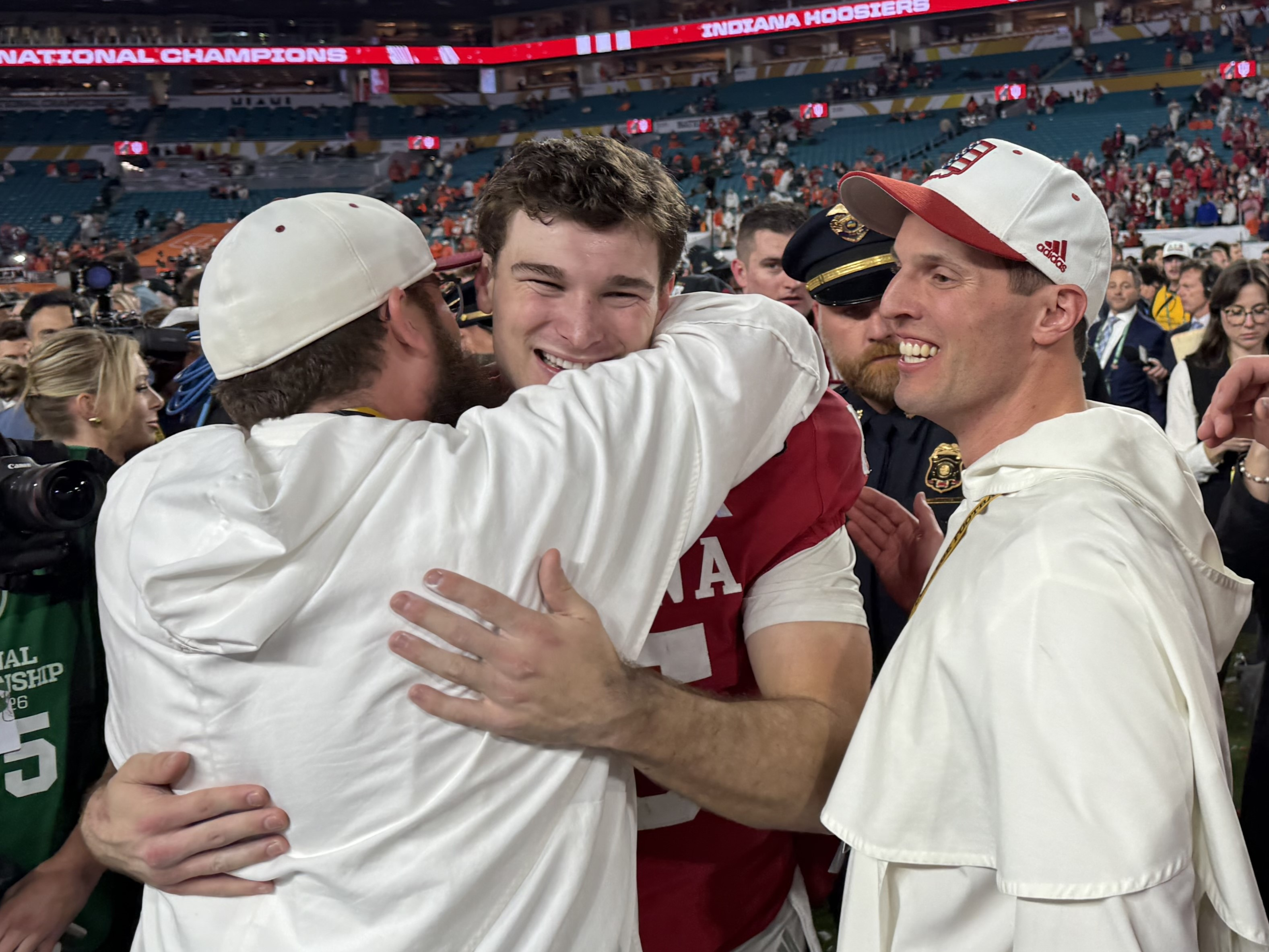
Fernando Mendoza greets Dominican priests he invited from the campus ministry at Indiana University to the 2026 CFP National Championship.

Mendoza cites his Cuban heritage as being a major factor for his and his brother's passion as football players. In a 2025 interview with Indiana University Bloomington news website Peegs.com, he said, "Alberto and I play football not for ourselves, not for fulfillment and satisfaction of ourselves—we have a lot of whys why we do it for. One of the whys is our mom. Another why is our entire family. Our entire family comes from a Cuban background. All of our grandparents were born and raised in Cuba, and that's something we always take deeply to heart".

He says that his Spanish language skills are more conversational than fluent, yet he delivered portions of his 2025 Heisman Trophy acceptance speech in Spanish to honor his family. Mendoza has emphasized the role of the "prideful and supportive" nature of Hispanic family culture as a cornerstone of his professional stability.

On December 18, 2025, Mendoza was named the inaugural recipient of the Hispanic Football Hall of Fame's Hispanic College Football Player of the Year Award.

=== Business ventures ===
Mendoza is an advocate for the National Multiple Sclerosis Society, and his mother, Elsa, lives with multiple sclerosis. Mendoza, alongside his brother, has created multiple menu items at restaurants in the towns of the colleges in which they have played; the money raised has gone to multiple sclerosis research. The items include the "Mendoza Burrito" at La Burrita in Berkeley, California, as well as the "Mendoza Bros. Burger" at BuffaLouie's and the "Mendoza Bros. Cubano" at Gable's Bagels in Bloomington, Indiana.

In March 2026, Mendoza participated in an online promotional campaign for Epic Games' Fortnite alongside Olympic figure skater Alysa Liu. In April 2026, he appeared in a commercial for the professional networking platform LinkedIn as part of his NFL draft campaign; the collaboration stemmed from his notable use of the platform to share career milestones. Mendoza has also signed name, image, and likeness (NIL) partnerships with brands including Adidas, Dr Pepper, and T-Mobile.

Awards
Preceded by Travis Hunter	Heisman Trophy; 2025	Succeeded by TBD
Sporting positions
Preceded by Jack Plummer	California Golden Bears starting quarterback 2023–2024	Succeeded by Jaron-Keawe Sagapolutele
Preceded by Kurtis Rourke	Indiana Hoosiers starting quarterback 2025	Succeeded by Josh Hoover
