= Fort Ord Dunes State Park =

State park in California, United States

- IUCN category III (natural monument or feature)
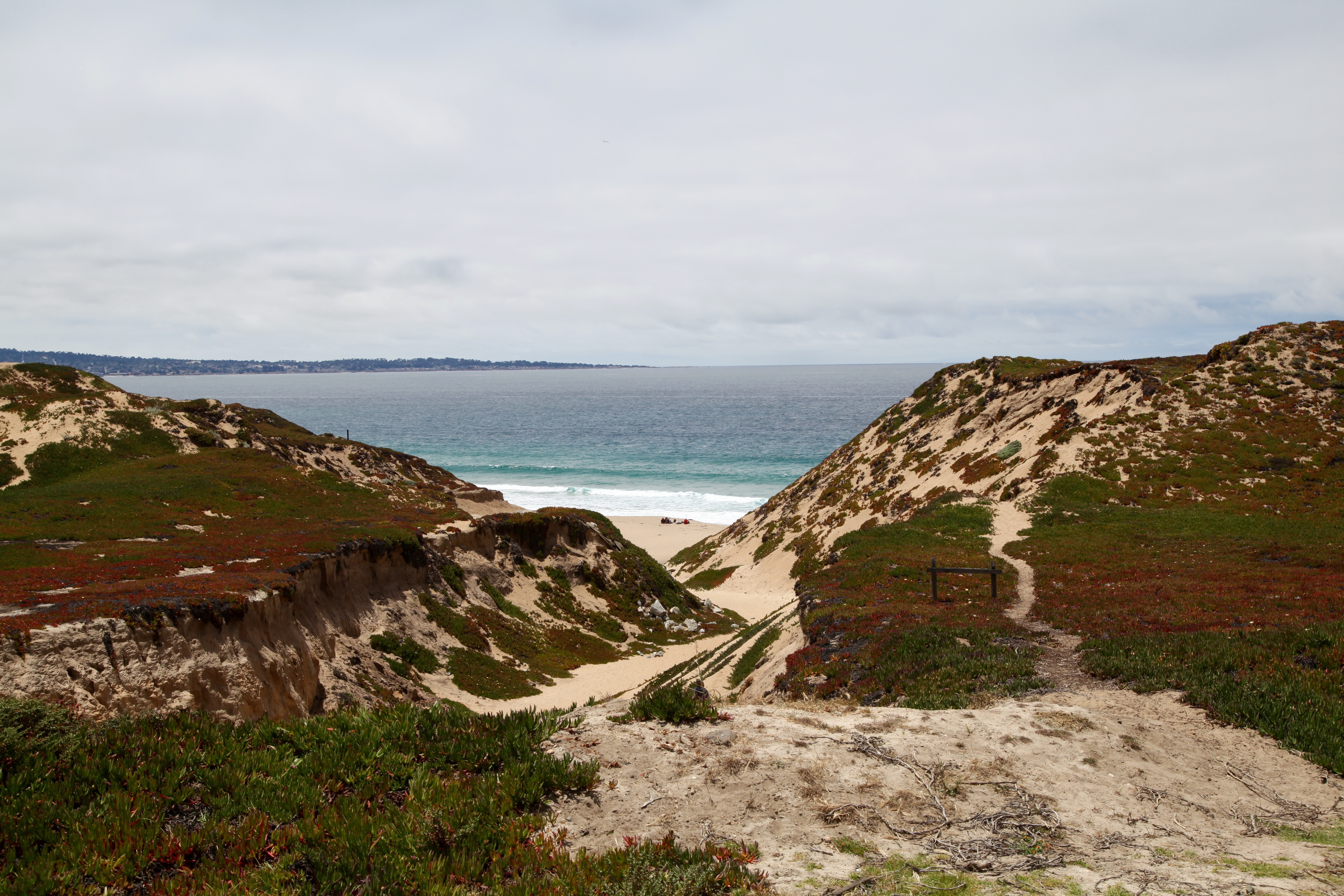
- Coastal dunes at Ford Ord Dunes State Park

- Location within California Location within the United States
- Location: Monterey County, California, United States
- Nearest city: Monterey, California
- Coordinates: 36°39′16″N 121°49′20″W
- Area: 980 acres (400 ha)
- Established: 2009
- Governing body: California Department of Parks and Recreation

Fort Ord Dunes State Park is a state park in California, United States, along 4 miles (6.4 km) of coastline on Monterey Bay and created from part of the closed Fort Ord. The park includes a boardwalk, a path to the beach, a 4-mile (6.4 km) road for walking and biking, and interpretive exhibits describing its former use as a military training area. As the dunes are a nesting area for sensitive species, public access is limited to the paths and trails.

== History ==
The Fort Ord Dunes State Park encompasses coastal areas of the closed Fort Ord, a United States Army installation. The area once held 15 rifle ranges for the installation. After undergoing restoration work the landmark became a state park in 2009. The land was transferred as a public benefit conveyance to the State by the National Park Service through the Federal Lands to Parks Program. The conveyance, at no cost to the State, requires that the land be used only for public park and recreation area purposes in perpetuity, with the federal government retaining a reversionary interest if the terms of the deed are not met. Other areas of Fort Ord have become the Fort Ord National Monument or have been used for commercial or educational purposes.

Fort Ord Dunes State Park was one of the 48 California state parks proposed for closure in January 2008 by Governor Arnold Schwarzenegger as part of a deficit reduction program. The closures were ultimately avoided by cutting hours and maintenance system-wide.

A new campground is planned for 2022. One unit will have 45 recreational vehicle (RV) sites with hookups for electricity and water. A second unit is for family camping with 40 sites for tents and small, self-contained RVs. The third unit will be for walk-in and cyclists.

== See also ==
- List of California state parks
