= Pebble Beach Equestrian Center =

Historic Equestrian Center in California, U.S.

- Pebble Beach Stables
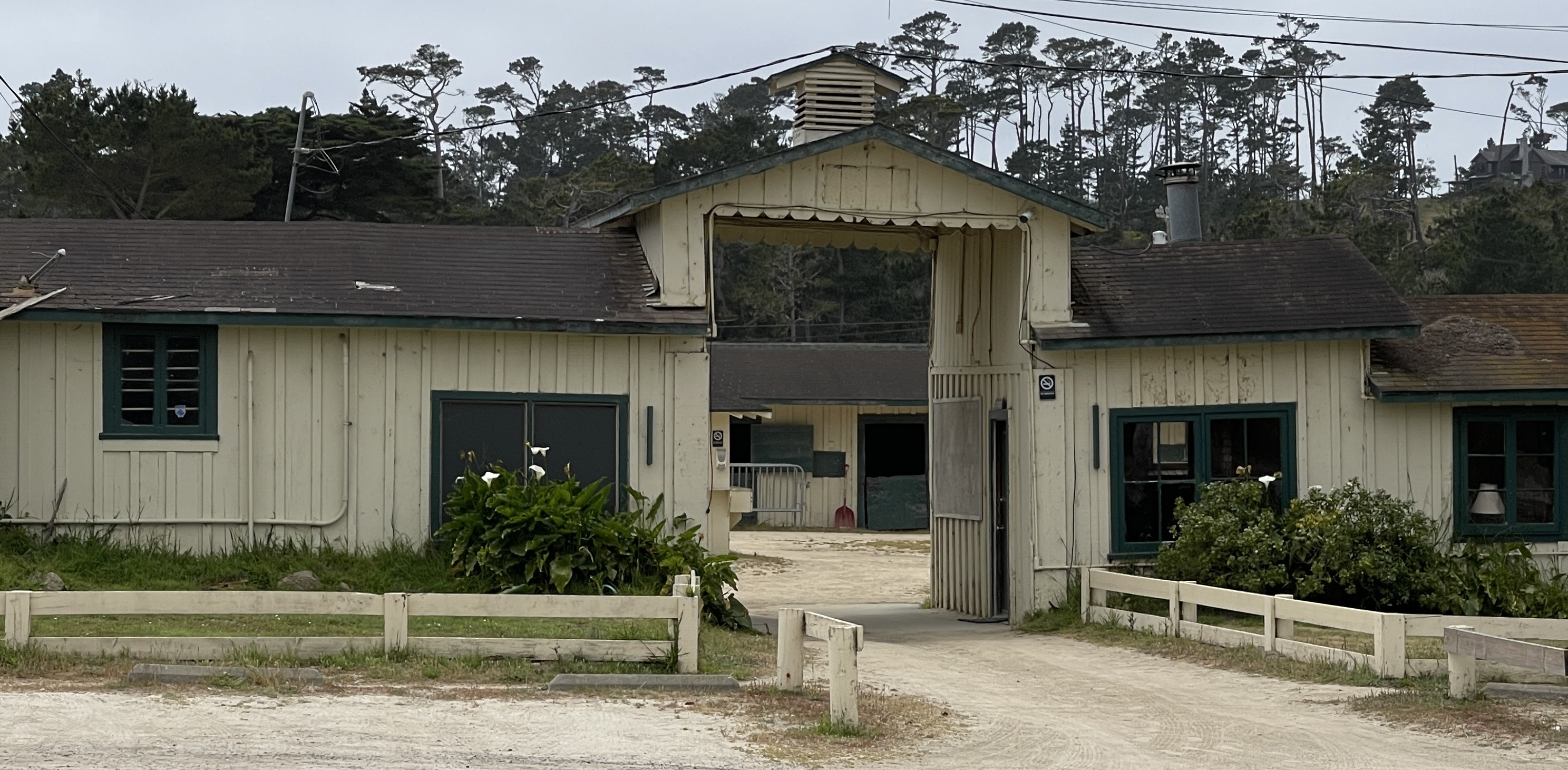
- Pebble Beach Equestrian Center

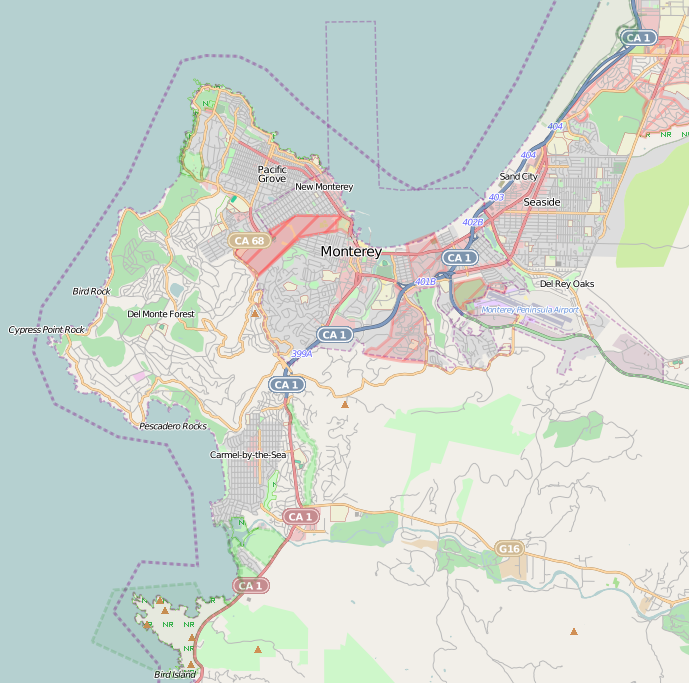
- Location in Monterey County
- 36°34′25″N 121°57′23″W
- Location: 3300 Portola Road, Pebble Beach, California, US

History
- Built: 1924; 102 years ago
- Built by: Fred Ruhl
- Built for: Samuel F.B. Morse
- Original use: Stables

Site notes
- Architectural style: Ranch-style house
- Current use: Equestrian facility

The Pebble Beach Equestrian Center was an equestrian center in Pebble Beach, California, that existed between 1924 and 2024. It was founded in 1924 by developer Samuel F.B. Morse. It was a boarding stable that sponsored riding lessons, horse shows, and had team trials for the 1960 Summer Olympics. People from all around the world came to the Equestrian Center, including Jackie Kennedy and the Beatles. Alois Podhajsky of the Spanish Riding School came to judge and instruct at the Equestrian Center.

== History ==
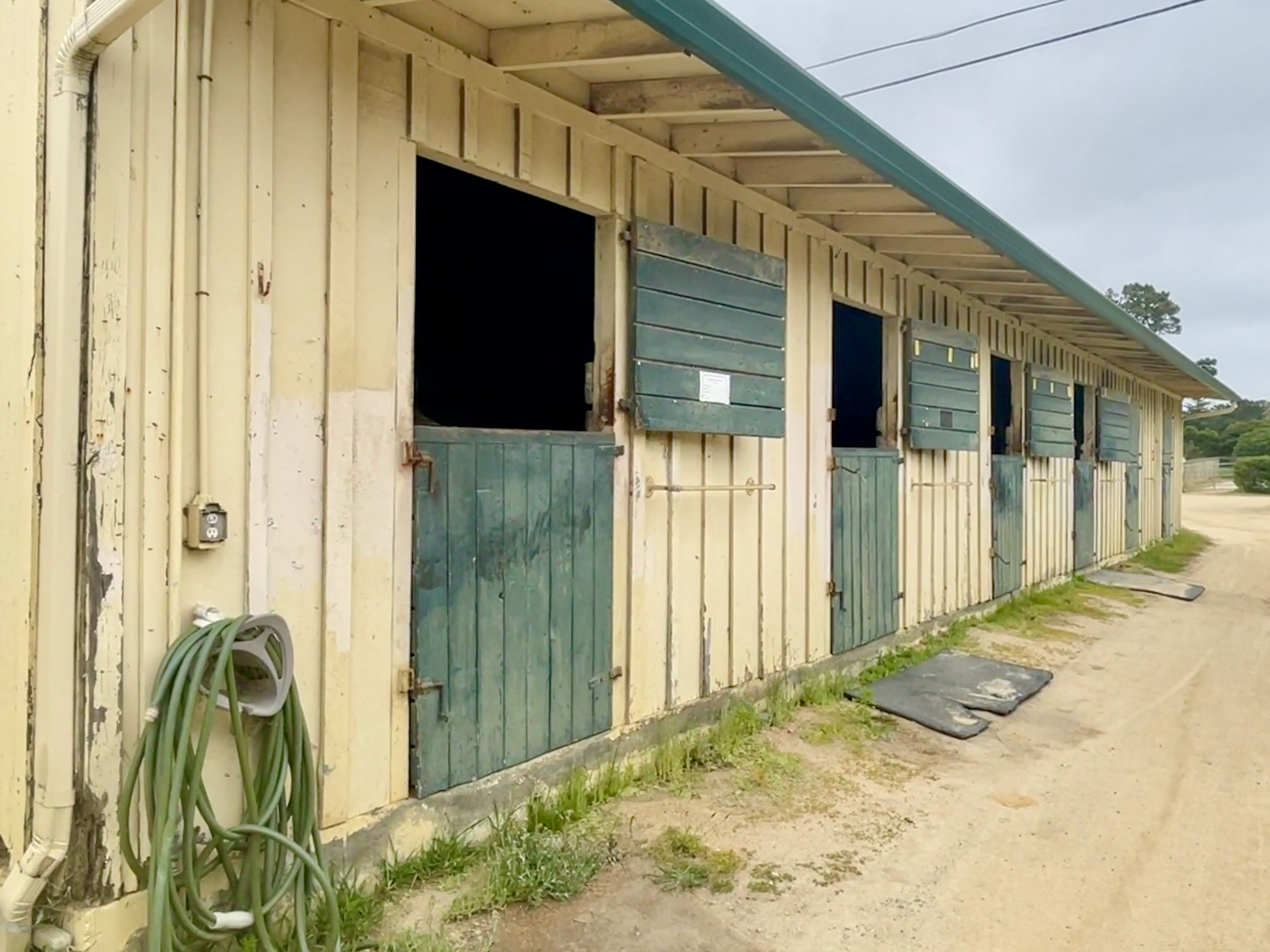
Pebble Beach Equestrian Center Stables

In 1920, Samuel F.B. Morse, the developer of Pebble Beach, California, cleared a field near the present-day Equestrian Center to develop a boarding stables to accommodate residents' horses called the Pebble Beach Stables. In 1924, Morse hired Fred Ruhl to build a quadrangle-style board and batten structure. In 1928, Grace Douglas (1880–1968) opened the Douglas School for girls. In 1941, the Pebble Beach stables was renamed the Pebble Beach Equestrian Center.

On August 4, 1946, the first Pebble Beach Summer Horse Show was held; it eventually became an annual event. In 1954, the U.S. Equestrian Team held a three-day training event for the 1955 Pan American Games in Chicago, and the team trails for the 1960 Rome Olympics were held at the center. On September 14 and 15, 1960, the U.S. 1960 Summer Olympics dressage trials were conducted at the Pebble Beach Equestrian Center. In 1966, Col. Alois Podhajsky, of the Spanish Riding School, came to judge and instruct the national dressage championships at the Pebble Beach Equestrian Trials.

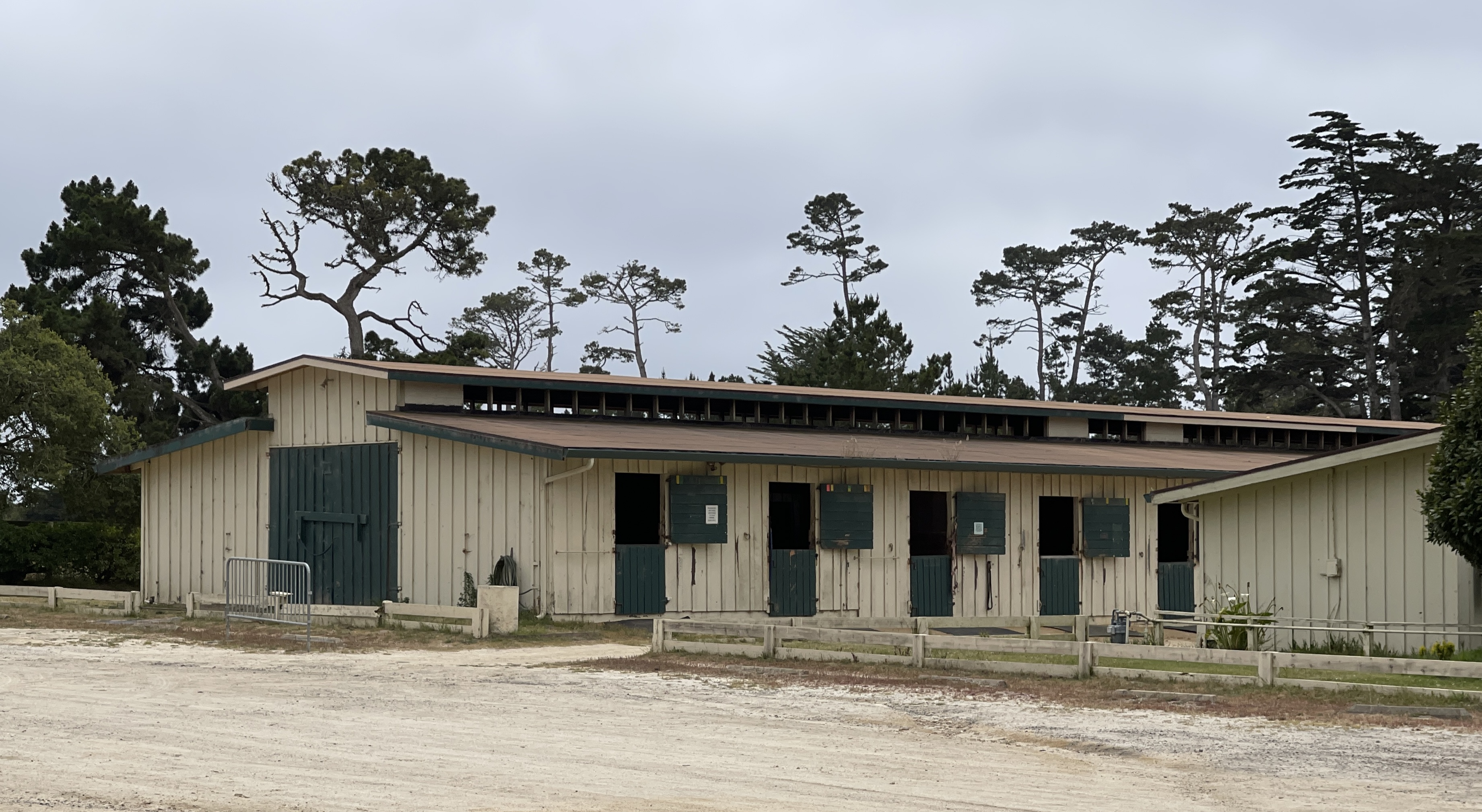
Pebble Beach Equestrian Center Barn

Movies have been made at the Equestrian Center, including Susan Slade starring Connie Stevens in 1961. In 1970, a hay barn was built into the facility and later a Polo Barn was created. Throughout the years, numerous event riders were trained at the center. The Pebble Beach Company assumed management of the Pebble Beach Equestrian Center on July 1, 2013,

After operating at losses for years, closure was announced in March 2023. The center permanently closed in June 2024 and demolished in September.

== See also ==
- List of equestrian sports
