= Stilwell Hall =

Building in California, United States

Coordinates: 36.66°N 121.82°W

Stilwell Hall was an immense, 52,000-square-foot (4,800 m^{2}) building that stood on a precipice at the edge of the Pacific on the west side of California Highway 1 at Monterey Bay, California, just across from the former Fort Ord military installation.

The building was constructed between November 1940 and September 1943 under the initiative of General Joseph W. Stilwell. It served as a recreational facility for military members for just over fifty years before Fort Ord was closed in 1994. It was used for parties and even as a Roller Skating Rink for folks of all ages in the 1980's. Abandoned, Stilwell Hall fell into disrepair and was torn down in 2003 after severe coastal erosion threatened to cause the structure, filled with asbestos and lead-paint, to collapse into the Monterey Bay National Marine Sanctuary.
