= Monterey Peninsula College =

Community college in Monterey, California, US

- Other name: Colegio de la Península de Monterey
- Type: Public community college
- Established: 1947
- Parent institution: Monterey Peninsula Community College District; California Community Colleges
- Accreditation: Accrediting Commission for Community and Junior Colleges
- Endowment: $12.6 million (2024)
- President: Marshall T. Fulbright III
- Superintendent: Marshall T. Fulbright III
- Location: Main campus; Monterey, California, United States; 36°35′32″N 121°53′1″W; Marina Campus; Marina, California; Public Safety Training Center; Seaside, California
- Campus: 97 acres (39 ha) (Main campus)
- Colors: Maroon and white
- Nickname: Lobos
- Sporting affiliations: CCCAA – Coast Conference
- Mascot: "Louis the Lobo" (Wolf)
- Website: www.mpc.edu
- 2025-2026 Adopted Budget, Monterey Peninsula Community College District El Yanqui, 10-15-1948, p.n1 School colors

Monterey Peninsula College (MPC) (Spanish: Colegio de la Península de Monterey) is a public community college in Monterey, California. Established in 1947, it was the first civilian postsecondary educational institution in the area surrounding the Monterey Peninsula. Until 1961 it was under the jurisdiction of the Monterey Union High School District. Today, it falls within the jurisdiction of the Monterey Peninsula Community College District and the California Community Colleges (CCC) system. Since 1961, the president of MPC has also served as the Superintendent of the MPCCD, with authority over MPC's satellite campuses. The main campus in Monterey is south of Lake El Estero, off of Fremont Street. Within the old territory of Fort Ord is the MPCCD's Fort Ord Center, a CCC-designated "Educational Center." Within the Fort Ord Center are the Monterey Peninsula College at Marina (MPC Marina), and the Seaside Public Safety Training Center (SPSTC). MPC's curriculum is accredited by the Accrediting Commission for Community and Junior Colleges.

== History ==
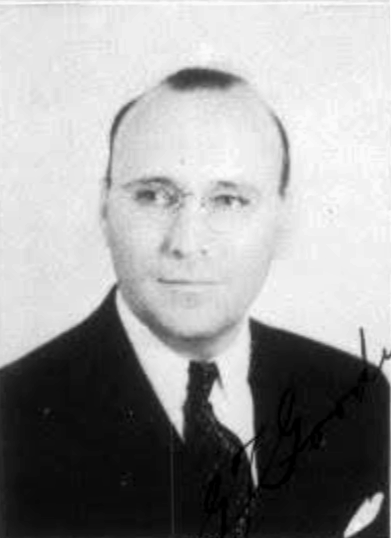
Glen Goodwill was the first superintendent of the Union High School District to oversee Monterey Peninsula College.

After World War II, an influx of war veterans returning to the area sought postsecondary education, but the closest institution at the time was Salinas Junior College. For two years after the war, much of Monterey Peninsula's socialite literati were involved, in some way, in the effort to establish a Junior College on the peninsula. The peninsula's business leaders also predicted that a Junior College would create an injection and stimulus to the local economy. Glen T. Goodwill, who at that time served as the Monterey Superintendent of Schools, was one of the loudest proponents.

Early in 1947, the community passed a bond measure which launched the Monterey Junior College within the jurisdiction of the Monterey Union High School District. Glen Goodwill coordinated with Remsen Bird, the former president of Occidental College, to create the first board of trustees and hire staff and faculty.

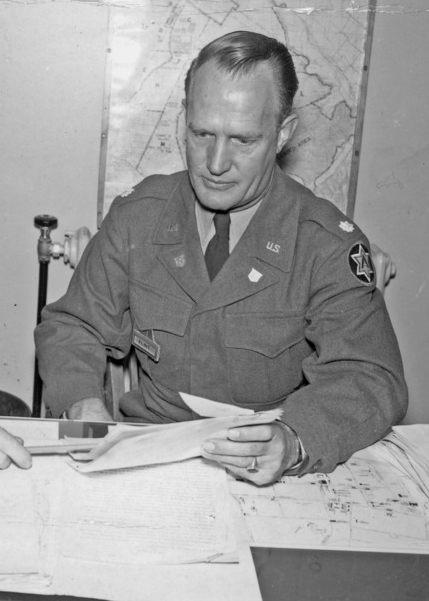
Calvin Flint was the first president of MPC, serving from 1947 to 1958. After his time at MPC, he became the first president of Foothill College and helped build De Anza College.

Calvin Flint, a war veteran and construction company manager, was hired as the first president of MPC. Formerly, he had been the dean of men at Santa Ana Junior College. Flint was hired to build a new curriculum and find a new campus simultaneously.

In mid-August, 1947, Flint was the guest speaker at a meeting of the Monterey Rotary Club. Flint told the Rotarians that it was now inappropriate to use the term "junior college" because most junior colleges had become more advanced and complex than they once were. They were now two-year versions of four-year universities. Flint told the audience, "The overall policy of the new college will be to stress good Americanism and democracy". On September 5, 1947, when Monterey Peninsula College taught its first classes, it existed as a night college on the campus of Monterey High School. Technically, MPC was categorized as the 13th and 14th grades attached to the high school, whose creation was authorized by the School Board.

Remsen Bird largely worked with Colonel Allen Griffin, owner of the Monterey Peninsula Herald, during the creation of the school. Over the course of 1947, Margaret Bates worked with Griffin to convince Samuel Finley Brown Morse to sell his property.

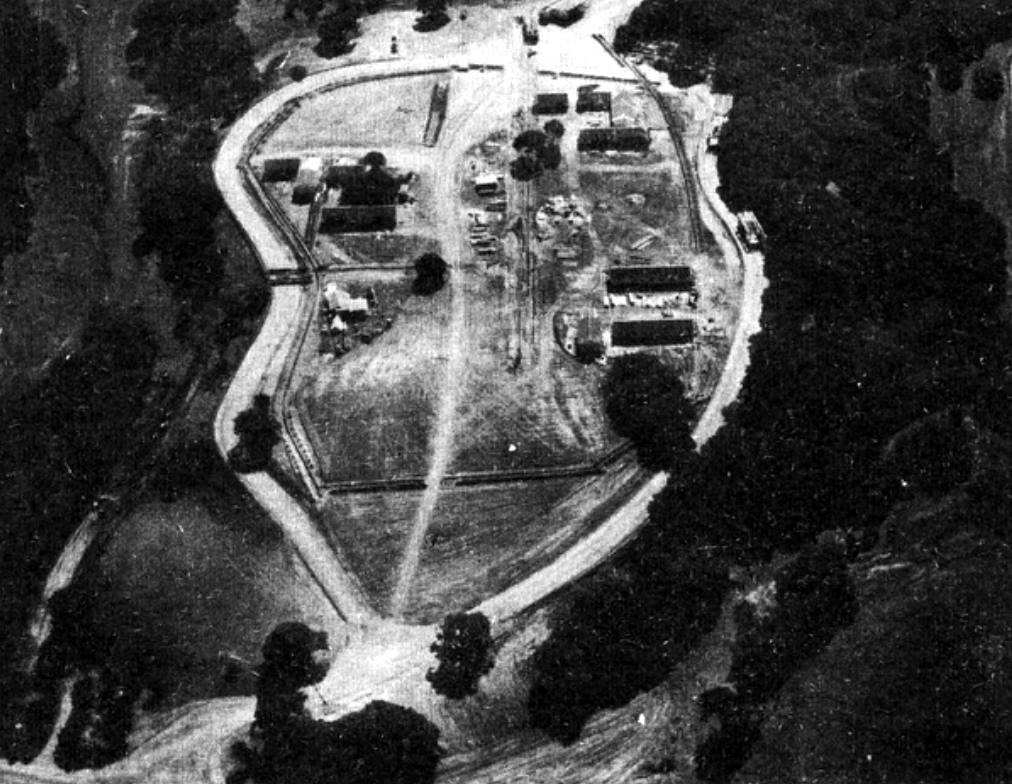
Aerial photograph of Monterey Peninsula College under construction in 1948

On September 10, 1948, the first classes were taught in "converted barracks" on the newly purchased land. There were 280 students in the inaugural class of freshmen and sophomores. They were taught by 20 faculty members. Construction on the first permanent buildings began soon after. The lead architect brought in to work on the new campus was Robert Stanton. There were 34 students in the first graduating class of 1949.

Flint resigned as president of MPC in 1958 to establish the new curriculum as the first president of Foothill College. While it was an amicable exit, he did take with him a large number of trusted instructors and deans from MPC to help him build that college. Locals in Monterey called this event the "Flint Exodus". The second president of MPC, Fredrick R. Huber, refilled the positions left vacant.

In 1961, MPC was recognized under the jurisdiction of its own Junior College District, breaking away from the Monterey Union High School District. After this, all future Presidents of MPC became known as President/Superintendent.

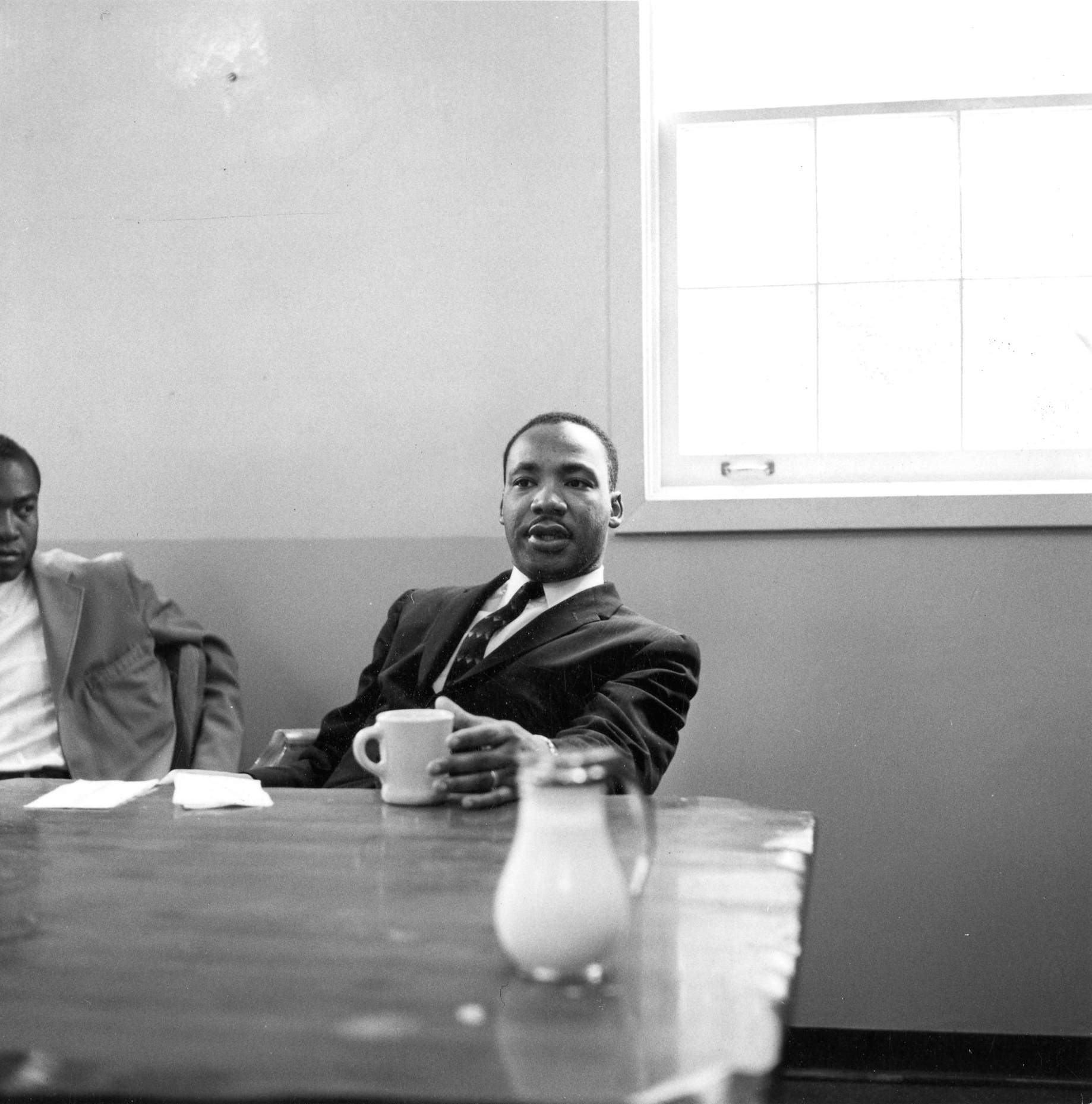
On March 24, 1961, Martin Luther King Jr. spent the day at Monterey Peninsula College.

On March 24, 1961, Martin Luther King Jr. spent the day on the MPC campus. All classes were cancelled so the students could attend his lecture entitled Moral and Spiritual Factors of Integration. At lunch, he ate with Margaret Bates and her husband Talcott Bates. During the day, King met with students and faculty. At dinner, he ate with the college faculty. In the afternoon, he gave a press conference in the Student Union building. At 8pm, he gave a lecture to 900 people at the MPC Armory entitled The Power of Non-Violence. Late in the evening, King met with community leaders in Seaside and gave a short address at the Friendship Baptist Church there.

In 1967, the football stadium at MPC became an official overflow campground for the Monterey International Pop Festival, with 20,000 people camping out on the field. The Grateful Dead, out of protest over the filming rights at the main venue, set up a free concert soundstage at the MPC football field so they wouldn't need to appear on camera. During the weekend, other performers played on the impromptu stage, like Jimi Hendrix, Jorma Kaukonen and John Cipollina. After the event, Rock Scully and Danny Rifkin stole the amps from the mainstage and used them for about a month on San Francisco before giving them back.

In 1974, MPC created the GENTRAIN (General Education Train of Courses) Program, which offered interdisciplinary approaches to history and culture. Retired residents from the local area were the majority to sign up for Gentrain courses.

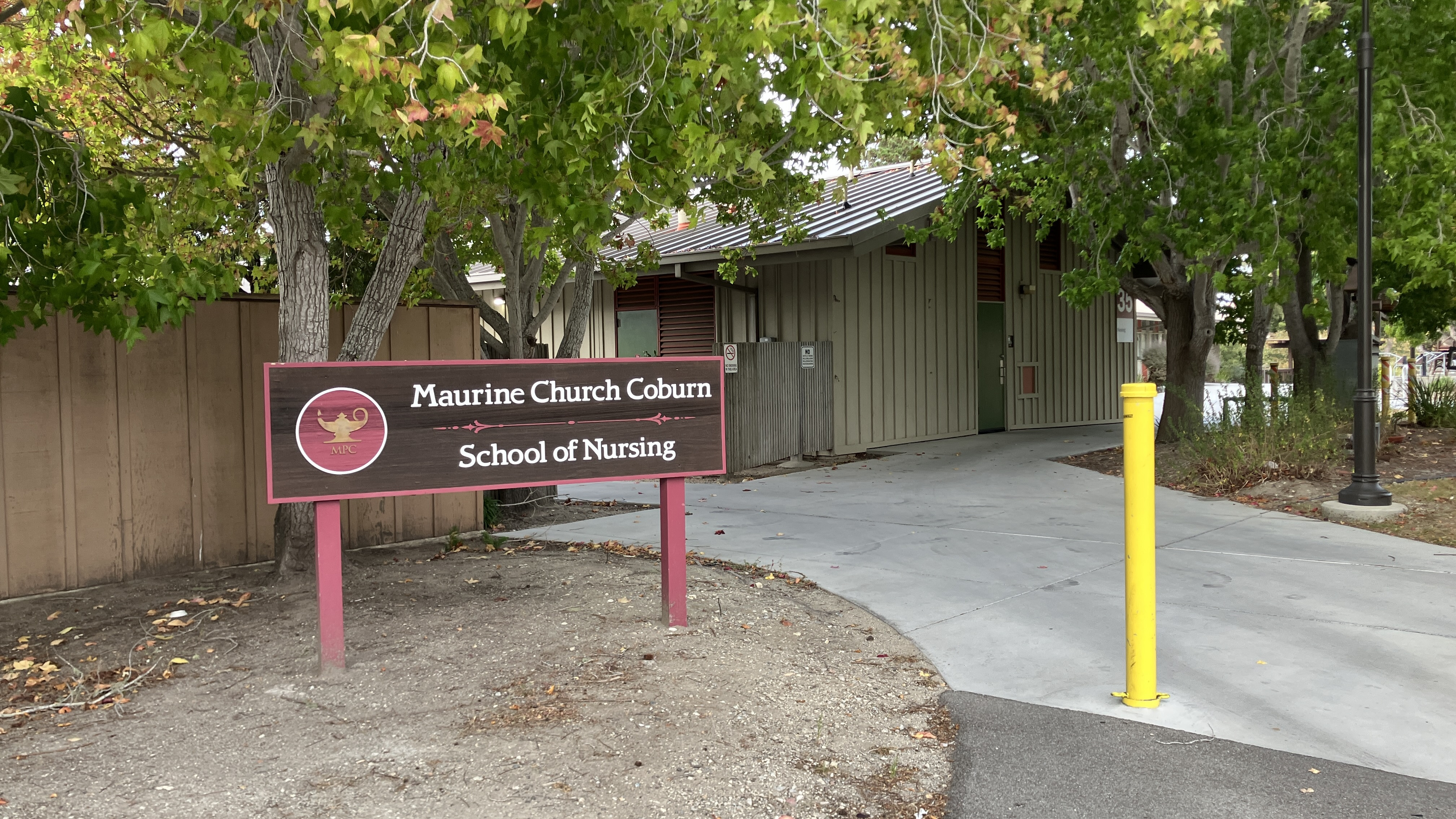
The Maurine Church Coburn School of Nursing was established in 1982.

In 1982, the Maurine Church Coburn Charitable Trust provided a grant to MPC to establish the Maurine Church Coburn School of Nursing, and it operated partially with funds donated by the Community Hospital Foundation. In August 1988, the Community Hospital Foundation donated more funds to remodel the old engineering building to become the new School of Nursing. The second floor of the School of Nursing was completed in 1999.

In 1994, MPC signed a partnership agreement with the Defense Language Institute (DLI) to offer Associate in Arts degrees that would be jointly conferred by DLI and MPC.

In 1998, the campus was embroiled in a scandal involving a campus counselor pleading no-contest in court to the charge of threatening a student after she rebuffed his advances. This brought attention to the fact that there was no law prohibiting relationships between students and teachers, and that the college did not previously have a policy prohibiting it.

Sometime around 2013, the California Department of Education and the State of California government stopped compensating colleges for repeat non-credit classes. A portion of the students at MPC at the time, and since its establishment, were known as "lifelong learners," who only enrolled in athletics or arts courses. Because those students could not take any more than one course, the lifelong learning program was effectively eliminated.

From October 10 to October 13, 2016, an External Evaluation Team of the Accrediting Commission for Community and Junior Colleges (ACCJC) visited MPC for its regular accreditation evaluation. The team submitted a detailing 22 recommendations for improvement at MPC, and noted that MPC was not in compliance with 15 minimum standards. In February 2017, ACCJC issued a mandatory two-year probationary period to MPC. MPC was removed from the probationary period in 2018, and was reaffirmed for accreditation.

Between 2009 and 2016, enrollment at MPC dropped from 8,500 to 6,261. This accounted for a total loss of between $2.5million and $5million in income for MPC. In 2016, MPC received $400,000 from California's Strong Workforce Program. In 2017, President Tribley stated that enrollment was at 6,701, and that MPC was fiscally solvent.

In May 2017, the faculty union called for a labor strike to demand higher pay. MPC was ranked 61st out of 72 districts in the state for faculty salary, and they had been operating for five years without a negotiated salary contract for instructors. By September 2017, the employment contract still hadn't been negotiated, and a dozen teachers picketed outside the school in the morning before classes started.

In November 2020, the electorate of the Monterey Peninsula Community College District service areas approved Bond Measure V. This measure awarded MPCCD and MPC $230million dollars to distribute across all three of its campuses. The vote was 62.62% for, and 37.38% against. MPC stated that the money would be used: "...to fund repairs to classrooms, facilities, roofs, plumbing, and electrical systems, removal of hazardous materials, and improvements to technology and equipment..." Bond Measure V also stipulated that an additional property tax levy would be emplaced in the service area.

== Academics ==
As of the 2022–23 school year, MPC offers 55 associate degree programs in fields such as health, business, and STEM with an additional 32 programs designed for transferring to a University for a bachelor's degree in the same field. The college has an articulation agreement with California State University to guarantee acceptance for 14 of their transfer degrees. They also offer numerous certificates as well.

== Facilities ==
The old engineering building was constructed in 1958.

In 1962, the Art and Music Center and the campus swimming pool were built.

=== Library ===
The first library director was Elizabeth E. Martin. The architectural firm Wallace Holm & Associates was brought in during 1958 to work on the original library building, which was completed in 1960. That library director during that time was Margaret Thompson. The current library building was built in 2004, under the leadership of library director Mary Anne Tweed.

== Arts ==
=== Theatre program ===
In 1954, Flint hired Morgan Stock, an actor professionally trained at the Pasadena Playhouse, to teach drama and english. Stock worked to establish MPC's theatre program, overseeing the development of a physical theatre building. The original theatre building was located on east side of campus, at that time known as the "main part of campus." It was described as a "Quonset hut-type structure, with some bleachers set up inside and an attached trailer for a stage."

A second theatre arts building was constructed in 1970. In May 2011, the building was completely remodeled to remove "graffiti," that had been drawn on the walls for over 40 years by performers after each performance on the mainstage. In the theatre arts building, the Morgan Stock Stage is the mainstage 300-seat theatre, named after Director Stock. There is also a black box theater with seating for 40 people known as the Studio Theater.

=== Colonel Allen Griffin Memorial Amphitheater ===
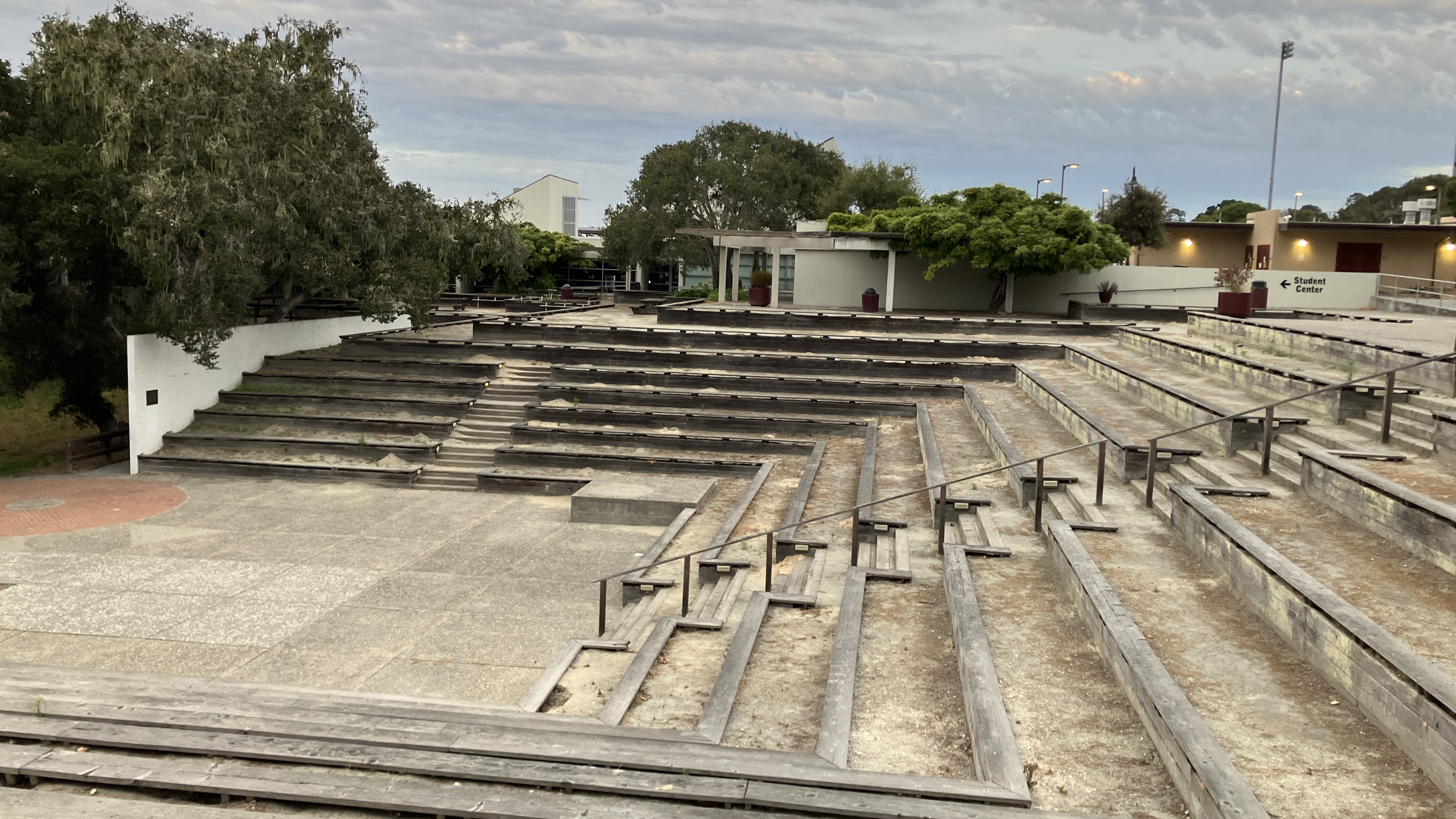
Colonel Allen Griffin Memorial Amphitheater.

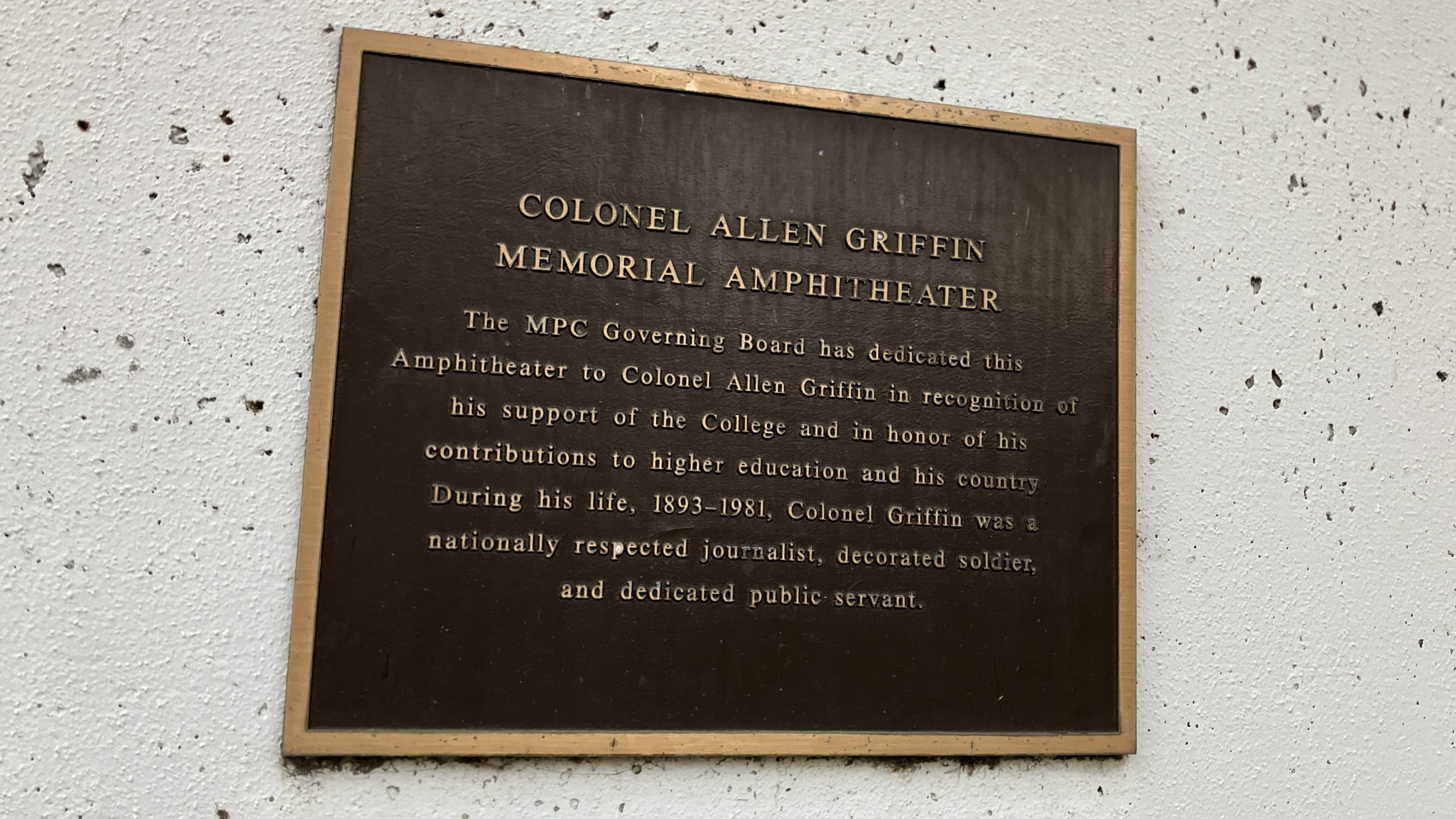
Plaque dedicating the amphitheatre to Allen Griffin.

When the MPC campus expanded in the late 1960's, and with the construction of the new theatre in 1970, Allen Griffin looked over the plans for the theatrical facility. Griffin, when he saw the plans, blurted out: "Where is the amphitheatre‽" The President of the college at the time, Bob Faul, said that the college couldn't afford an amphitheatre. Griffin asked why not, and Faul replied that the college only had $10,000 left of their allotted budget to spend on new construction, and the contractors bid for the amphitheatre had come out to $80,000.

If they wanted to build an amphitheatre, they would need to find an additional $70,000 from somewhere. Allen Griffin got out his checkbook, wrote a check for $70,000, and handed it to President Faul. Griffin said: "The Amphitheatre is essential; built it! But no one is to know where the money came from!" In the student newspaper, the total cost of the cost of the new construction was listed as $56,200, and the "anonymous benefactor" gifted $30,000.

The announcement for the construction of the amphitheatre came in April 1970, and it was finished around the Autumn of 1971. It was designed by the architect Edward L. Barnes. Its purpose was not limited to the theatre department; any students could use it for any desired purpose, any day of the week. When it was originally constructed, a fire pit was built to provide nighttime illumination for performances.

On November 19, 1991, the MPCCD board resolved that the MPC amphitheatre be renamed the "Allen Griffin Memorial Amphitheater."

== Athletics ==
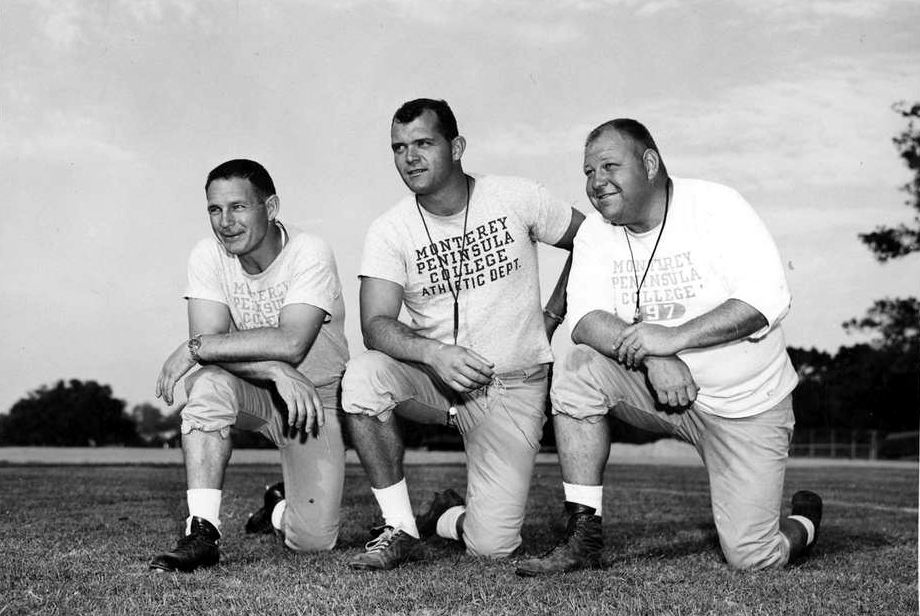
Luke Phillips, Chris Pappas, and Tor Spindler

Monterey Peninsula College competes in the Coast Conference as a Junior College. In 1947, several college mascots were considered by the MPC Student Council, including the Paisanos, in honor of the early inhabitants of the area, or the Amigos (English: friends). They selected to become the Lobos, which is derived from lobo, the Spanish word for a wolf. The figurehead mascot for the Lobos became Louie the Lobo. In 1949, there was a debate to become Lobos Marinos, or Sea Wolves, but they decided to remain Lobos. In 1958, a female figurehead mascot named Louise the Lobo was introduced.

Coach Luke Phillips first arrived at MPC as a student in 1948 to co-captain MPC's first football team. He left the college soon after to become one of "Pappy's Boys," playing for Pappy Waldorf in the 1949 and 1950 seasons at California Golden Bears football. Phillips returned to MPC in 1957 as a coach.

Coach Warren "Tor" Spindler, a veteran of the United States Marine Corps, arrived at MPC in 1958. In addition to coaching, he was a professor who taught courses in the Administration of Justice.

In 1961, Coach Phillips brought Lobos Football to the First Annual Lettuce Bowl, where they won the trophy.

Coach Chris Pappas had worked with Phillips as an Assistant Coach in the early 1950s at San Jose State Spartans football, alongside Bill Walsh and Dick Vermeil. Pappas arrived at MPC in 1963. He coached football and baseball, and was also the Lobos Athletic Director for 28 years. Pappas created the MPC Adaptive Physical Education program, where he coached students with physical disabilities. He helped create the Northern California Football Association, and served as executive director of the California Community Football Coaches Association.

=== Pappas-Phillips Community Stadium ===
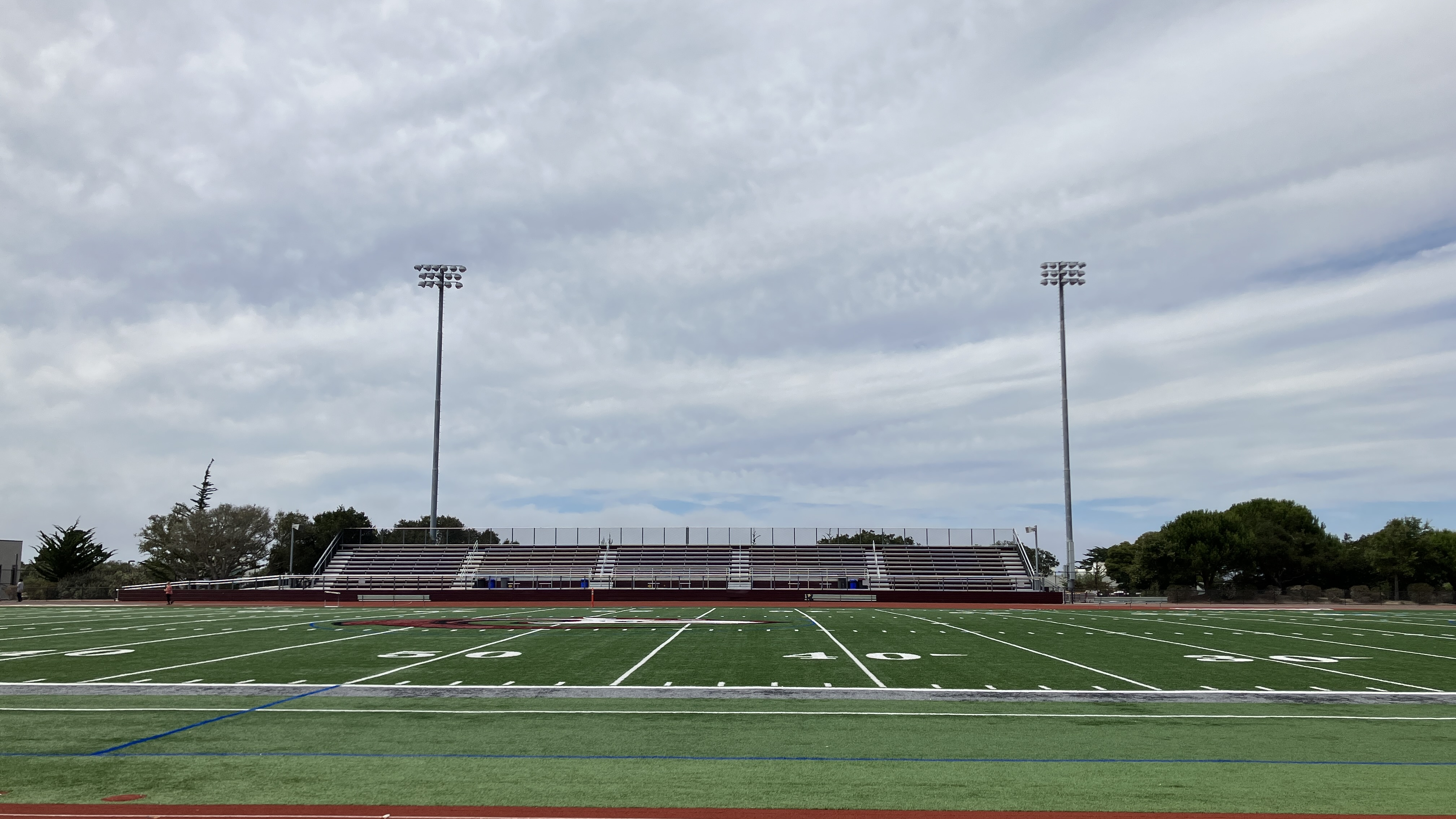
Pappas-Phillips Community Stadium away team bleachers.

In late 2020, the MPC Board of Trustees unanimously voted to dedicate the MPC Stadium as the Pappas-Phillips Community Stadium. On September 3, 2022, during the Saturday halftime ceremonies at the home game against Yuba College, the MPC Stadium was officially dedicated as the Pappas-Phillips Community Stadium, in memorial honor of Coaches Luke Phillips and Chris Pappas.

== Satellite campuses ==
=== Monterey Peninsula College at Marina ===
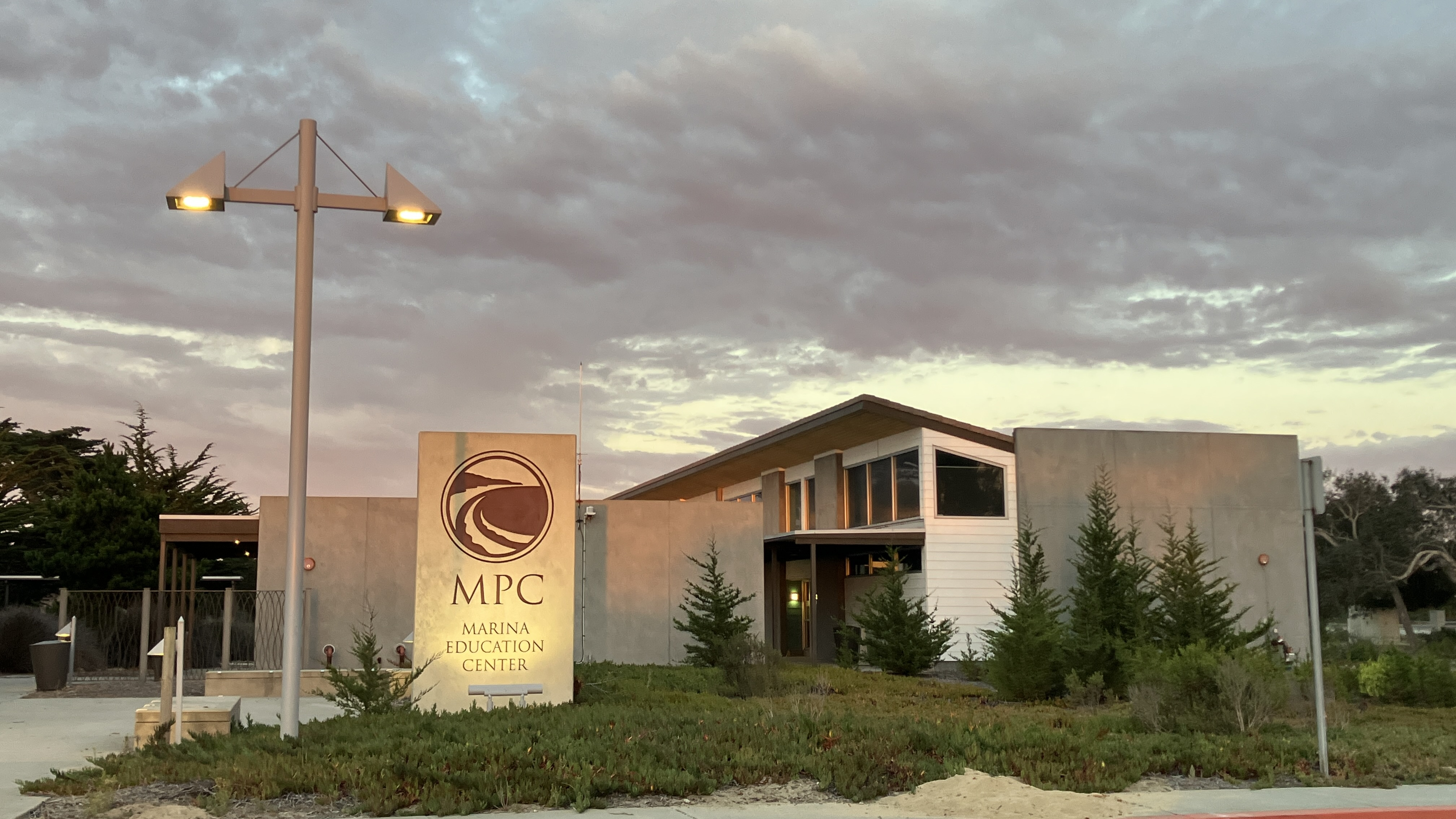
Monterey Peninsula College at Marina (MPC Marina), formerly known as the Marina Education Center (MEC).

From 1971 to 1993, MPC operated the Fort Ord Education Center on Fort Ord. Under the authority of the United States Army, they taught college courses to military personnel and their families on base. When Fort Ord was being decommissioned, MPC was allowed to keep its education center, transforming it into the Marina Education Center (MEC). MEC continued to offer programs for students from the nearby towns of Marina, Sand City, and Seaside, focusing on what they called "basic skills courses."

By 2016, MEC held 8 classrooms and a computer classroom and lab. The MPC English Studies Skills Center had a satellite office at MEC. Each of the main classroom buildings were arranged around a main quad, with newer portable buildings installed to the north. They taught courses in math, english as a second language, and other basic skills courses. MEC students in 2016 found it difficult to transfer to four-year institutions, or finishing transfer programs, and MPC instituted several steps to correct this in an Institutional Action Plan, which outlined an expanded scope of the MEC program. They coordinated with Marina High School to consider Running Start programs, and to develop programs that would better serve the Marina community.

Sometime later, the Marina Education Center was re-structured to become the Monterey Peninsula College at Marina, or simply MPC Marina, with MPC desiring to expand that campus with more a robust program. The California Community Colleges Board of Governors later voted to officially designate the Fort Ord Center area as an "Educational Center." Fort Ord Center includes both of the campuses of MPC Marina and the Public Safety Training School. Educational center designation authorizes students within the Fort Ord Center to be conferred with degrees without needing to appear at the main campus.

When Bond Measure V was approved in November 2020, MPC allocated $100million of the total money to MPC Marina for a campus expansion. The Mayor of Marina, Brian Delgado, said that: “This $100 million includes ground-up construction of state-of-the-art science and chemistry facilities for nursing and other health professions, kitchens for hospitality students, and classrooms for public safety classes.”

In May 2025, MPCCD hired the architectural design firm Flint+JKAE to design the new expanded campus. Two design concepts were created for review; the first design concept was called The Hub, the second was called The Central Green. The Hub would be a single-building design, and The Central Green would be two-buildings. MPCCD also hired M. Arthur Gensler Jr. & Associates, Inc. to support the 2026 Integrated Facilities Plan.

=== Seaside Public Safety Training Center ===
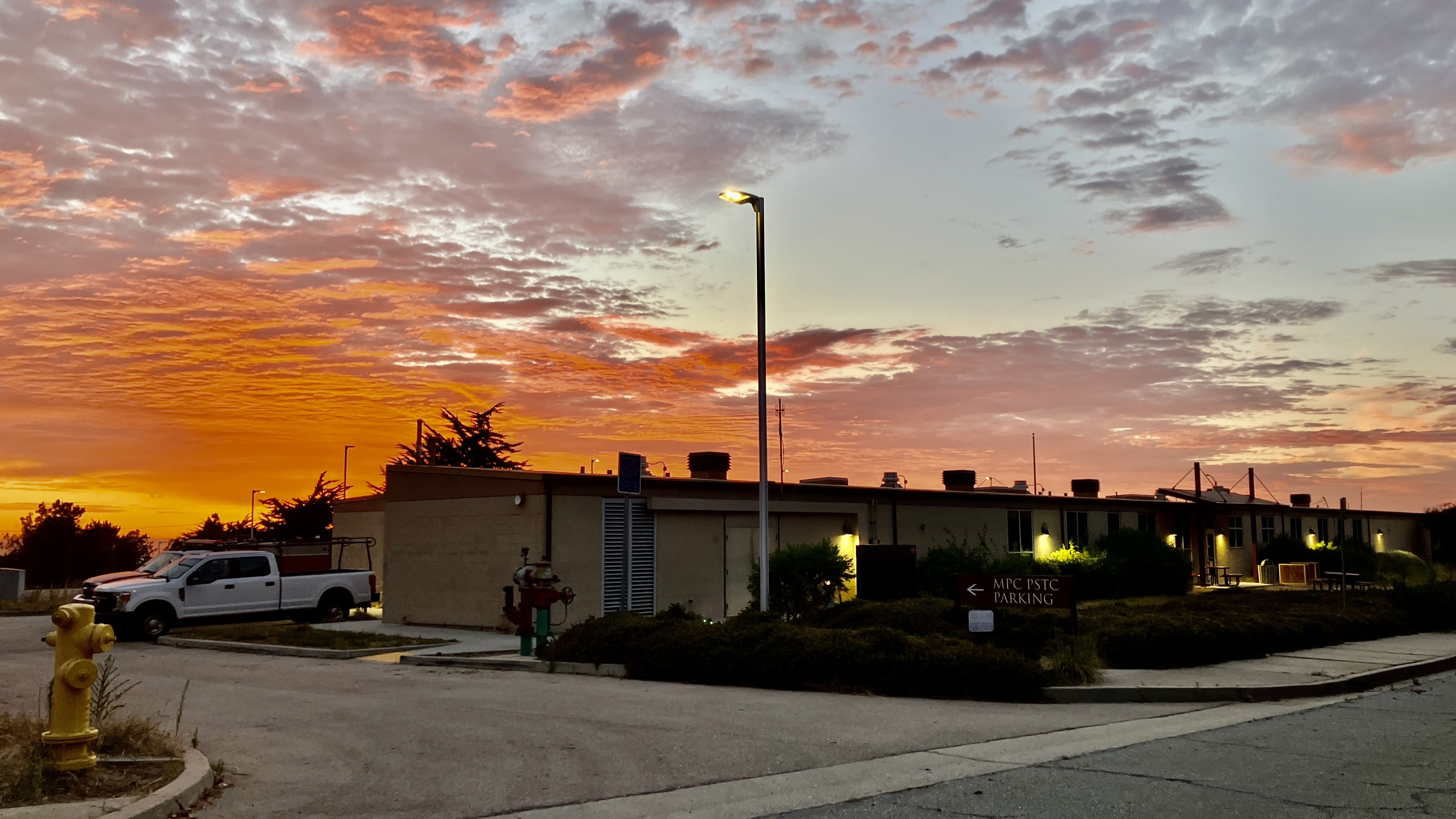
Seaside Public Safety Training Center.

After the Cold War ended and Fort Ord was closed, MPC was granted additional property to develop. In 1993, MPC negotiated with the Ford Ord decommissioning authority to establish a training academy, near the site where the Presedio Police Station sat. The Seaside Public Safety Training Center (SPSTC) manages specialized training programs for public safety and security professionals. This campus hosts an introductory police academy, a fire academy, ambulance training, and emergency medical technician (EMT) training.

The fire academy is accredited as an "Accredited Regional Training Program" by the California Department of Forestry and Fire Protection and the California State Fire Marshal.

The police academy is accredited by the California Commission on Peace Officer Standards and Training (POST), and serves as part of the larger consortium of seven different community colleges that comprise the South Bay Regional Public Safety Training Academy, known as "The Academy."

In 2003, FORA and Monterey County also allocated MPC the former MOUT site, a fake village called "Impossible City," on Impossible Canyon Road, and 50 acres of the former area of Parker Flats (excluding the apartment complex), to incorporate into their police and fire academies, but these properties are still awaiting environmental cleanup assessments to finish before MPC, or any other agency, incorporates them into any future training program. Proposals awaiting approval include an Emergency Vehicle Operations Course (EVOC), in addition to the MOUT site. Monterey County and the City of Salinas have negotiated with MPC to jointly use the MOUT site to train current members of the local SWAT, police departments, and sheriffs offices, when the site becomes readied for use. MPCCD has also proposed a firing range, new classrooms, and burn buildings.

== Notable people ==
=== Athletes ===
- Nick Cunningham, Olympic bobsledder
- Herm Edwards, college and professional football coach
- David Fales, professional football player
- Edwin Grande, professional wrestler, signed to WWE under the ring name Bronco Nima
- Ron Johnson, professional football player
- Herb Lusk, professional football player
- Matai Leuta, Olympic rugby player
- Bashir Levingston, professional football player
- Maurice Mann, professional football player
- Bill McClintock, college basketball player
- Pete O'Brien, professional baseball player
- Terry Poole, professional football player
- Marco Ramos, professional basketball player
- Eric Richardson, professional football player
- Nate Wright, professional football player

=== Other ===
- Joseph Gutheinz, attorney, college instructor, commissioner, writer, and former U.S. Army intelligence officer and aviator, and Federal law enforcement officer
- Jimmy Panetta (also known as James Varni Panetta), politician
- Gaylen Ross, director, writer, producer, and actress
