= Marina High School (Marina, California) =

- 298 Patton Parkway Marina, CA; United States

Information
- Type: Public
- Motto: Navigating The Future
- Established: 2006 but used to be an elementary school back when military housing (Fort Ord) was being used in the area
- School district: Monterey Peninsula Unified School District
- Superintendent: Daniel P. K. Diffenbaugh
- CEEB code: 051938
- Principal: Rebecca Tyson
- Teaching staff: 37.49 (FTE)
- Grades: 9-12
- Enrollment: 725 (2023-2024)
- Student to teacher ratio: 19.34
- Colors: Blue & Gold
- Mascot: The Mariner
- Rival: Trinity Christian High School
- Feeder schools: Los Arboles Middle School
- Website: The Marina High School Website; Home of the Mariners

Marina High School is a public high school located in Marina, California which began operating in 2006. Marina High School is within the Monterey Peninsula Unified School District (MPUSD). The campus is smaller than the average high school and smaller than the other MPUSD high schools, Monterey and Seaside high schools. The first graduating class was in 2009. Average enrollment is 630 students. The school serves the cities of Marina, Seaside, Monterey, nearby CSUMB residential parks, Pacific Grove, and Salinas.

== Athletics ==
The football team won its first game in the fall of 2013 and won three more games after that. Autumn athletics include cross country, football girls volleyball, and cheerleading. Winter sports are boys basketball, girls basketball, boys soccer, and girls soccer. Spring sports are baseball, softball, and off-campus aquatic swimming.

== Students ==
Enrollment is at about 600 students.

=== Ethnicities ===
Ethnicities of Marina High School are shown on the pie chart on the left. Most of the students are Hispanic, mainly Mexican and Salvadorian. Most of the white students are Italian, German, Irish, and/or Spanish and others included. Asian students are mainly South Korean, Japanese, Vietnamese, and South Asian. Pacific Islander students are mainly Samoan, Tongan, Indo-Fijian, and others included. The school has a Latino Club and Pacific Islanders Club.

Student Ethnicities at Marina High School.
1. Hispanic (39.0%)
2. White (26.0%)
3. Asian (17.0%)
4. Black (10.0%)
5. Hawaiian Native/Pacific Islander (4.00%)
6. 2 or more races (4.00%)
7. Alaskan Native or Native American (0.00%)
8. Other (0.00%)

=== Vans Custom Culture Competition ===
In 2014, Marina High School made it into the top 50 of the Vans Custom Culture competition. Miguel Martinez (11), Marissa Braxton (11), Areli Rico (11), and Sally Jimenez (12)represented the school.
