= Monterey Peninsula Unified School District =

School district in California, United States

Address
- 700 Pacific Street Monterey, California, 93940; United States

District information
- Type: Public
- Grades: K–12
- NCES District ID: 0625530

Students and staff
- Students: 9,403 (2020–2021)
- Teachers: 493.71 (FTE)
- Staff: 625.88 (FTE)
- Student–teacher ratio: 19.05:1

Other information
- Website: www.mpusd.net

Monterey Peninsula Unified School District is a public school district based in Monterey County, California, United States.

The district serves the communities of Monterey, Del Rey Oaks, Sand City, Seaside, almost all of Marina, and a portion of the Del Monte Forest census-designated place.

== Schools ==
=== Elementary (TK-6th) ===
- Crumpton Elementary School
- Del Rey Woods Elementary School
- Marina Vista Elementary School
- Dr. Martin Luther King School of the Arts
- Marshall Elementary School
- Olson Elementary School
- Ord Terrace Elementary School

=== Middle (7th/8th) ===
- Los Arboles Middle School
- Seaside Middle School
- Walter Colton Middle School (closed 2023/2024 year)

=== High ===
- Central Coast High School
- Marina High School
- Monterey High School
- Seaside High School

=== TK-8 ===
- Dual Language Academy of the Monterey Peninsula
- La Mesa School
- Monte Vista School
