= Herb Lusk =

American football player (1953–2022)

No. 32
- Position: Running back

Personal information
- Born: February 19, 1953; Memphis, Tennessee, U.S.
- Died: September 19, 2022 (aged 69); Philadelphia, Pennsylvania, U.S.
- Listed height: 6 ft 0 in (1.83 m)
- Listed weight: 190 lb (86 kg)

Career information
- High school: Seaside (CA)
- College: Long Beach State
- NFL draft: 1976: 10th round, 273rd overall pick

Career history
- Philadelphia Eagles (1976–1978)

Career NFL statistics
- Rushing attempts: 113
- Rushing yards: 483
- Rushing TDs: 2
- Stats at Pro Football Reference

Herbert Hoover Lusk II (February 19, 1953 – September 19, 2022) was an American professional football running back for three seasons in the National Football League for the Philadelphia Eagles from 1976 to 1978.

== Early life ==
Lusk was born in Memphis, Tennessee, on February 19, 1953. He attended Seaside High School in Seaside, California. He initially studied at Monterey Peninsula College (MPC) from 1972 to 1973, before transferring to California State University, Long Beach (CSULB). He played for the 49ers from 1974 to 1975. He started his custom of praying after scoring a touchdown during his senior year, in which he led the Pacific Coast Athletic Association in touchdowns (16), points (96), rushing attempts (310), rushing yards (1596), rushing touchdowns (13), yards from scrimmage (1658), and touchdowns from scrimmage (16). Lusk was drafted by the Philadelphia Eagles in the tenth round (273rd overall) of the 1976 NFL draft.

== Professional career ==
Lusk made his NFL debut with the Eagles on September 12, 1976, at the age of 23, in a 27–7 loss against the Dallas Cowboys. In the third game of his career on September 27, 1976, he fumbled the ball with 12 seconds remaining in the first half after he opted to run instead of running out the clock. This led to the Eagles relinquishing their 10–3 lead over the Washington Redskins, with Philadelphia ultimately losing the game in sudden-death overtime. He played in 14 games (1 start) during his rookie season and recorded 254 rushing yards, 13 receptions, and 119 receiving yards. He made the seventh-longest rushing attempt in the league (70 yards) the following year, and became the first NFL player to kneel in the endzone after a touchdown and pray on October 9, 1977. This custom gained him the nickname "The Praying Tailback". He scored two other touchdowns that season, to go along with 229 rushing yards, 5 receptions, and 102 receiving yards in 11 games. He played just 3 games during his final year in the NFL, and attended one day of training camp in July 1979, before retiring from football at the age of 26 to become a minister.

== Personal life ==
Lusk was married to Vickey until his death. Together, they had three children: Danuelle, Laiah, and Herbert III. Lusk was inducted into the CSULB Hall of Fame in October 2005, and was also enshrined in MPC's Lobo Hall of Fame.

After retiring from professional football, Lusk returned to college at Gwynedd Mercy University and Reformed Episcopal Seminary to finish his degree in theology. He then became the pastor of the Greater Exodus Baptist Church in Philadelphia, starting in 1982. He oversaw an increase in the number of congregants from 27 members to over 1,500 by 2006. He also served as team chaplain to the Eagles. A supporter of the Republican Party, Lusk delivered the invocation at the party's national convention in 2000. His church was later given $1 million in federal funds to run a program assisting low-income Philadelphians. He also addressed the World Meeting of Families 2015 held in Philadelphia.

Lusk died on September 19, 2022, at his home in Philadelphia. He was 69, and had cancer prior to his death. He was interred at West Laurel Hill Cemetery in Bala Cynwyd, Pennsylvania.
