= DMDC =

DMDC may stand for:

- Defense Manpower Data Center, a facility that keeps data on military personnel in the United States.
- Dimethyl dicarbonate, a beverage preservative.
- Dansk Medicinsk Data Center ApS, a Danish EMR-systems development company
- Slang acronym for "Doesn't Matter, Don't Care."
