= Ralph Rubio =

Ralph Rubio may refer to:

- Ralph Rubio, owner of Rubio's Coastal Grill
- Ralph Rubio (mayor), American politician who served as the first Latino mayor of Seaside, California
