= Ty Powell =

American football player (born 1988)

No. 48, 57, 58
- Position: Linebacker

Personal information
- Born: April 27, 1988 (age 38); Marina, California, U.S.
- Listed height: 6 ft 2 in (1.88 m)
- Listed weight: 249 lb (113 kg)

Career information
- High school: Seaside (Seaside, California)
- College: Harding
- NFL draft: 2013: 7th round, 231st overall pick

Career history
- Seattle Seahawks (2013)*; New York Giants (2013)*; Buffalo Bills (2013–2015); Philadelphia Eagles (2016)*
- * Offseason or practice squad member only

Career NFL statistics
- Total tackles: 23
- Sacks: 1
- Stats at Pro Football Reference

Ty Powell (born April 27, 1988) is an American former professional football player who was a linebacker in the National Football League (NFL). After transferring from De Anza College, Powell began playing college football in 2011 for the Harding Bisons in Arkansas. He was selected in the seventh round, 231 overall by the Seattle Seahawks in the 2013 NFL draft.

== Early life ==
His hometown is Marina, California, and he attended nearby Seaside High School.

== Professional career ==
=== Seattle Seahawks ===
Powell was selected by the Seattle Seahawks in the seventh round (231st overall pick) of the 2013 NFL draft.

On September 11, 2013, Powell was signed to the Seahawks practice squad, and he was released on September 12, 2013.

=== New York Giants ===
On September 24, 2013, Powell was signed to the New York Giants.

=== Buffalo Bills ===
The Buffalo Bills signed Powell off of the Giants practice squad on October 8, 2013. He was an active player in the 2013 and 2014 seasons.

=== Philadelphia Eagles ===
On May 17, 2016, Powell signed with the Philadelphia Eagles. On June 9, 2016, Powell announced his retirement from football.
