= Empire College =

Private college in Santa Rosa, California, US

Coordinates: 38.4679°N 122.7291°W

- Type: Private law and business school
- President: Roy Hurd
- Location: Santa Rosa, California, United States
- Website: www.empcol.edu

Empire College is a private for-profit college in Santa Rosa, California. Founded in 1961, the college offers business and law degrees and is accredited by the Committee of Bar Examiners of the State Bar of California, as a branch campus of Monterey College of Law.

== History ==
The college was founded in 1961 by Henry Trione. It was first located in the Bank of America building on Old Courthouse Square. When the bank moved out in 1961, Trione bought the building and immediately gilded the top of the clock tower.

In 2011, the U.S. Education Department reported that students who graduated from Empire College's business school were defaulting on student loans more than twice the national average.

In 2012, Empire College was listed on the President's Higher Education Community Service Honor Roll with Distinction, one of two colleges in the state of California in that category. In 2013, Empire was one of the top 19 finalists in the country, being recognized again in 2014 and 2015.

It was formerly accredited by the Accrediting Council for Independent Colleges and Schools (ACICS) until the United States Secretary of Education denied ACICS's accrediting status in 2016.

In 2019, the U.S. Department of Education reported that Empire College's 3-year cohort default rate for FY 2016 had dropped to 4.1 percent, a rate lower than that of Santa Rosa Junior College (8.5 percent) and the national average (10.1 percent).

In February 2020, the school announced that it was closing its School of Business over the next 18 months, citing lower enrollment that was worsened by three years of wildfires.

== See also ==
- Empire College School of Law
