= Veterans Transition Center =

Non-profit rehabilitation center for veterans

Housing units at the VTC

The Veterans Transition Center (VTC) is a non-profit 501(c)(3) rehabilitation center and shelter for veterans, founded in 1998 in Monterey County, California. The VTC is located at the site of the former Fort Ord near Marina, California. While the program is funded partly by the U.S. Department of Housing and Urban Development and United States Department of Veterans Affairs, it largely relies on donations from the public. The VTC seeks a holistic approach to helping homeless veterans that includes community service, life skills classes, sobriety requirements, counseling, and transitional housing. According to the U.S. Army Monterey Presidio Public Affairs bureau:

In general, the mission of the Veterans Transition Center is to provide services for Monterey County's homeless veterans and their families ... by providing veterans with transitional housing, emergency services and case-management programs, veterans will once again become employable and productive members of the community.

Currently, the center is looking forward to adding a vocational rehabilitation program and more housing units. The vocational rehabilitation program is to include a non-profit store with the express purpose of hiring the most veterans possible, while the additional housing units will increase the center's capacity for veterans to rehabilitate. Since its inception, the VTC has served 4,155 single veterans and 351 veterans with families. According to the center:

An estimated 80% of veterans who graduated from the VTC program transitioned into permanent housing for at least one year while 92% of who were in the program for 1 year maintained sobriety. At the time of graduation, 87% of veterans had $700 or more in savings and 75% were employed with a mean wage greater than $9.00 per hour. Among families, 100% of school aged children attended school, 80% of children pursued an after-school hobby, and 100% of all veterans with families enrolled in healthy families insurance.

In May 2021, the center took over the management of the Last Chance Mercantile, a secondhand store at Monterey Waste Management District.

In 2025, in collaboration with EAH Housing, the center opened the Lightfighter Village in Marina, California, a 71-unit subsidizied housing complex for low-income veterans and their families.

In 2026, the center is celebrating its 30 anniversary.
