= Seaside High School (California) =

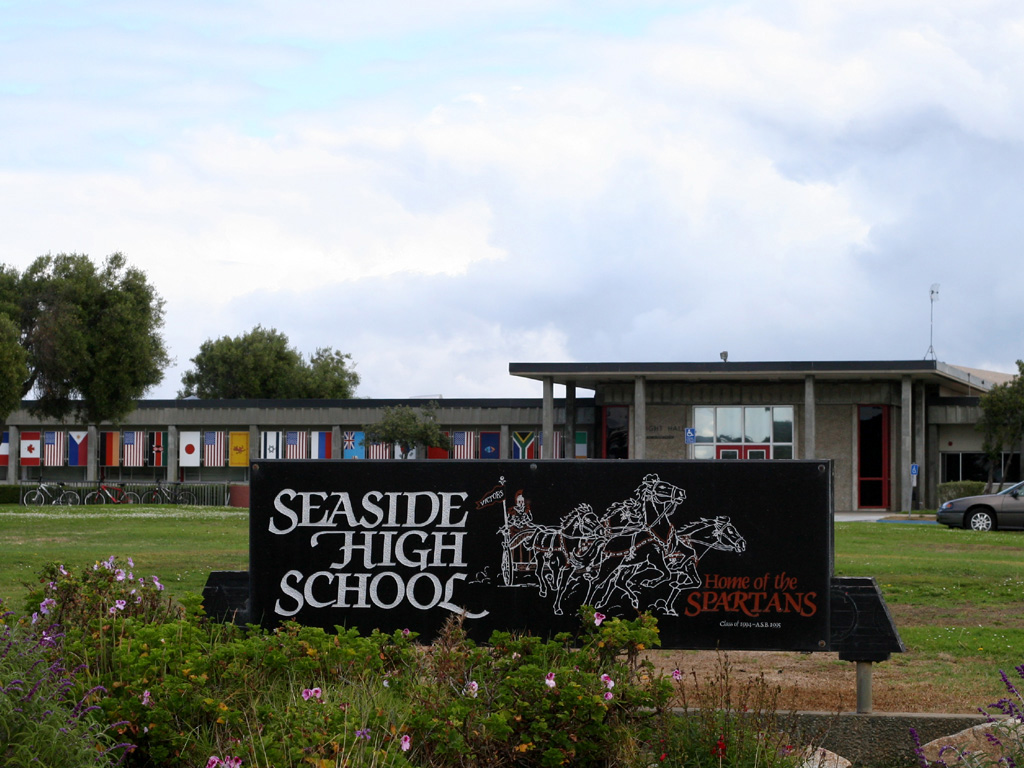

Location
- 2200 Noche Buena Street; Seaside, California 93955; United States; 36°37′21″N 121°50′14″W

Information
- Type: Public
- Established: 1963
- School district: Monterey Peninsula Unified School District
- Principal: Andrew Aguiniga
- Teaching staff: 52.81 (FTE)
- Grades: 9–12
- Enrollment: 1,073 (2024–2025)
- Student to teacher ratio: 20.32
- Colors: Red and Black
- Nickname: Spartans
- Rival: Monterey High School
- Website: SHS

Seaside High School is a school located in Seaside, California. The school first opened in September 1963 to sophomores and juniors (incoming seniors continued to attend Monterey High School until graduation), graduating its first class in June 1965. Average annual enrollment is 1,400 students, attending grades 9–12. The school serves the communities of Seaside, Monterey, Marina, Sand City, and Del Rey Oaks. Its student body reflects the region's diversity of language, ethnicity, nationality, and cultures. The school mascot is the Spartan.

== Notable alumni ==
- Ron Rivera, NFL player and coach; played for the Chicago Bears in the 1980s and served as the head coach for the Carolina Panthers and Washington Commanders
- Mason Foster, former NFL linebacker for the Tampa Bay Buccaneers and Washington Commanders
- Tony Curtis, former NFL tight end for the Dallas Cowboys and Baltimore Ravens
- Heinz Insu Fenkl, award-winning writer, translator, professor and editor
- Bashir Levingston, former NFL player
- Herb Lusk, former NFL player
- Yūsaku Matsuda, actor
- LeCharls McDaniel, former NFL defensive back for the Washington Redskins and New York Giants
- Ty Powell, former NFL player
- Rachel Roy, fashion designer and philanthropist
