= Monterey College of Law =

- Established: 1972
- School type: Private Law School
- Location: Seaside, CA, US; 36°35′48″N 121°53′29″W
- Enrollment: 265
- Faculty: 140 (Adjunct Only)
- Bar pass rate: 61.2% (2025 Cumulative Pass Rate)
- Website: Monterey College of Law

The Monterey College of Law (MCL) is a private, non-profit law school founded in 1972 in Monterey County, California. The main campus is situated on the old territory of Fort Ord, in Seaside, California, next door to the Monterey County Bar Association. The school is approved by the Committee of Bar Examiners of the State Bar of California and is accredited by the Western Association of Schools and Colleges (WASC), but is not accredited by the American Bar Association. As a result, while graduates of MCL can sit for the California Bar Exam, and upon passing, be licensed to practice law in California, they are generally not able to sit for the bar exam or practice in other states without passing the California bar exam first. MCL has part-time evening J.D., Master of Legal Studies (M.L.S.), and LL.M. degree programs.

== History ==
Monterey College of Law was founded in 1972 as a 501(c)3 nonprofit by a group of local lawyers and judges. The early years reflected a modest operation that frequently moved, using temporary rented classrooms in schools, churches, and the local Naval Postgraduate School. As founding Dean David Kirkpatrick once described, “the law school was in session when I pulled up to a rented classroom and carried the box of school supplies in from the trunk of my car.” Leon Panetta served as the new law school's first tort law professor.

In 1995, Dean Karen Kadushin negotiated a permanent home for the law school, obtaining 3.2 acres and two abandoned army buildings adjacent to California State University Monterey Bay (CSUMB) on the former Fort Ord.

By 2005, Dean Frank Hespe had converted the first of the two buildings into a 12,000 sq. ft. renovated classroom, library, and administration building within the higher-education enclave being developed on the former Fort Ord Army base, joining CSUMB, Hartnell College, and the Monterey Peninsula College.

In April 2010, under the leadership of Dean Mitchel Winick, the school opened its second building, a Certified LEED Platinum Community Justice Center that became home to its clinical programs and the Mandell Gisnet Center for Conflict Management.

In 2010, the law school opened a first-year satellite campus in Santa Cruz, California. After completing the first-year curriculum, Santa Cruz students commuted to the main campus in Seaside, California to complete their degree programs. In May 2020, after adding and expanding an online Hybrid JD program, the Santa Cruz satellite campus was closed because local students could take classes online and not have to commute to Seaside for their upper-division courses.

In early 2015, Monterey College of Law acquired the University of San Luis Obispo School of Law, a registered unaccredited law school formerly located in Morro Bay, California. The new law school became an approved branch of Monterey College of Law, was moved to a new campus in downtown San Luis Obispo, and was renamed the San Luis Obispo College of Law.

In 2017, the law school opened its second approved branch campus, Kern County College of Law in Bakersfield, California. The program started in the conference room of the Kern County Bar Association, but in 2018 moved to its current location near the Kern County Courthouse in downtown Bakersfield.

In 2022, Monterey reached an agreement, approved by the State Bar of California Committee of Bar Examiners, to transition the Empire College School of Law into a branch of Monterey. Under the agreement, Empire began transitioning from a for-profit, accredited law school to a non-profit, accredited branch of Monterey under the new name Empire College of Law.

As of 2024, Monterey is the only law school approved by the State Bar of California authorized to have multiple branch campus locations and an online Hybrid JD option.

In May 2025, the law school received accreditation by the Western Association of Schools and Colleges (WASC).

As of July 31, 2025, after 20 years of service as president and Dean, Mitchel L. Winick will retire, and Lisa Sperow will take over as the new President/CEO. Elizabeth Xyr will continue as the Chief Academic Officer, and Greg Brandes will continue as the COO/CFO.

== Curriculum and technology ==
MCL has part-time evening J.D., Master of Legal Studies (M.L.S.), and LL.M. degree programs. MCL was the first California-accredited law school authorized to offer a Master of Legal Studies degree, concurrent MLS/JD degrees, and an LL.M. advanced law degree. In 2010, MCL became the first U.S. law school to provide iPads for every student and professor. In 2017, the law school was one of the first two California accredited law schools and one of only a few law schools in the nation to be approved to offer an accredited online hybrid JD program.

== Programs and clinics ==
=== Mandell Gisnet Center for Conflict Management ===
Bill Daniels, one of the founding “fathers” of the law school, facilitated the creation of the Mandell Gisnet Center for Conflict Management through a local bequest. Organized in 2004 by the founding executive director and current California State Senator Bill Monning, the center has subsequently provided mediation certification and training for almost 1,000 law students, local lawyers, and community mediators. The Center coordinates the local court-directed mediation program, the Neighbor Project, and numerous other mediation programs for city, county, and community groups.

=== Community clinics ===
Started in 1992 by former Dean Marian Penn, the original Small Claims Advisory Clinic program has grown into more than a dozen different advisory clinics in which supervised law students provide free legal advisory services in the areas of small claims, conservatorship, guardianship, domestic violence, immigration, landlord/tenant, mediation, family law, neighbor disputes, elder law, collections, workers' compensation, social security, and probate law.

=== Moot court ===
Since 1984, all students have participated in a Constitutional Law moot court program as part of the trial advocacy skills training during their final law school year.

== Leadership ==
Following the example of founding Dean David Kirkpatrick, local lawyers, including Marian Penn, Joel Franklin, Rodney Jones, Al O’Connor, R. Lynn Davis, and Fred Herro, served as part-time deans for the first twenty years. In 1995, Dean Karen Kadushin ushered in the era of full-time deans, followed by Dean Frank Hespe. Mitchel L. Winick, the president/dean from 2005 through 2025, served as the longest tenured dean of the school, having joined the organization as its 12th dean in August 2005.

Winick is retiring in July 2025 after serving for 20 years as the dean of the law school. Winick also successfully lead the school through the rigorous accreditation process required by the Western Association of Schools and Colleges (WASC) that was granted in May 2025.

Lisa Sperow will assume leadership of the law school on August 15, 2025, as President/CEO. In addition, senior leadership includes Elizabeth Xyr as the Chief Academic Officer and Greg Brandes as the COO/CFO.

== Bar exam passage ==
California Accredited Law Schools (CALS) must “maintain a minimum, [five-year] cumulative bar examination pass rate” of 40 percent or more, as calculated under Rule 4.160(N) and Guideline 12.1 of the Guidelines for Accredited Law School Rules. Monterey College of Law is fully compliant under the regulation and has maintained the following Cumulative Pass Rate on the California Bar Exam: 2025=61.2%, 2024=52.3%, 2023=55.8%, 2022=55.43%, 2021=53.8%, 2020=53.7%, 2019=54.3%, 2018=47.9%. State Bar of California#Controversy of State Bar Examination release of test subjects

The law school has been an outspoken advocate requesting that the California Supreme Court adjust the scoring of the California Bar Exam from an arbitrarily high minimum passing score (“cut score”) to a score closer to the national norm. The California Supreme Court issued an order on August 10, 2020, adjusting the California “cut score” from 1440 to 1390, closer to the national mean of 1350. Monterey has continued to push for further equity in the State Bar licensing process, serving as the lead author in a pending 2024 request to the California Supreme Court to adjust the minimum passing score to the national norm of 1350 from its current 1390.
