= Nate Wright =

American football player (born 1947)

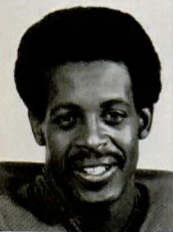

No. 24, 41, 43
- Position: Cornerback

Personal information
- Born: December 21, 1947 (age 78); Madison, Florida, U.S.
- Listed height: 5 ft 11 in (1.80 m)
- Listed weight: 180 lb (82 kg)

Career information
- High school: Monterey (Monterey, California)
- College: San Diego State (1967–1968)
- NFL draft: 1969: undrafted

Career history
- Atlanta Falcons (1969); St. Louis Cardinals (1969–1970); Minnesota Vikings (1971–1980)

Career NFL statistics
- Interceptions: 34
- Fumble recoveries: 4
- Touchdowns: 1
- Stats at Pro Football Reference

Nathaniel Wright (born December 21, 1947) is an American former professional football player who was a cornerback in the National Football League (NFL) from 1969 to 1980. He played college football for the San Diego State Aztecs.

== Early life ==
He attended Monterey High School in Monterey, California, where he was a standout football and basketball player.

== College career ==
He was an All-Conference player from two years at San Diego State University after transferring from Monterey Peninsula College before turning pro.

== Professional career ==
Undrafted, Wright was signed by the Atlanta Falcons in 1969. He played three games and recorded one fumble before being traded to the St. Louis Cardinals. In ten games, he recorded two interceptions. The next year saw him record just one interception before he moved over to the Minnesota Vikings in 1971. That year, he played in three games and recorded no interceptions. He recorded ten combined interceptions in the next three seasons, which included six in 1974. In the 1973 playoffs, he recorded an interception in the Divisional Round matchup against Washington off Billy Kilmer on their way to a victory (coincidentally, Wright's next interception in the playoffs was also against Kilmer). Wright didn't record a further interception as the Vikings lost in Super Bowl VIII. In the 1974 postseason, Wright recovered a fumble at the 20-yard line and ran it in for a touchdown that the Vikings won 30–14 over St. Louis. It was his first ever touchdown and the first of only two he scored in his career.

Wright was the defensive player who was covering Drew Pearson during the 1975 NFC Playoffs on the infamous Hail Mary pass in the 1975 NFC Divisional Playoff Game between the Dallas Cowboys and Minnesota Vikings, played on December 28, 1975. Some observers and Viking players believed that Pearson pushed off on Wright, causing him to fall down and thus allowing Pearson to catch the pass from Roger Staubach and score the winning touchdown. However no penalty was called on Pearson.

He was one of the fifteen plaintiffs in Mackey v. National Football League in which Judge Earl R. Larson declared that the Rozelle rule was a violation of antitrust laws on December 30, 1975.

He had his highest total in 1976 with seven. He recorded twelve combined interceptions over the next three years; Wright recorded his third and final interception in the playoffs in the 1977 NFC Championship, doing so off Roger Staubach in the 23–6 loss to the Dallas Cowboys. Wright's career ended in 1980, and he did so after picking off two passes in sixteen games (four starts). He totaled 34 interceptions and three fumble recoveries in 156 professional games. He was never selected to a Pro-Bowl or given All-Pro honors.

== See also ==
- The Hail Mary (American football game)
