= Empire College School of Law =

Private law school in Santa Rosa, California

- Parent school: Empire College
- Established: 1973
- School type: Private/For-Profit
- Dean: Fiona Hall
- Location: Santa Rosa, California, US; 38.4674°N 122.7286°W
- Faculty: 56 (all adjunct)
- Bar pass rate: 73% cumulative five-year pass rate
- Website: law.empcol.edu

The Empire College School of Law, part of Empire College and founded in 1973, is a four-year evening law school program approved by the Committee of Bar Examiners of the State Bar of California. As an evening-only law school, the School of Law is not accredited by the American Bar Association. As a result, graduates are generally only eligible to take the bar and practice law in California. Empire Law School's professors are practicing attorneys and judges from the North Bay area who teach in their specialty areas.

Empire graduates comprise approximately 25 percent of the Sonoma County Bar and include members of the judiciary in Sonoma, Napa, Mendocino, Merced, Lassen, Lake, and Calaveras counties.

Following a year of construction, the college opened its new campus in January 2000 which includes, as tenants, two California superior courts for the County of Sonoma at which civil cases are conducted. Moot Court and Trial Practice classes are held in the courtrooms. In the 2000 Roger J. Traynor California Appellate Moot Court Competition, the Empire College Moot Court Team won first place in both The California Academy of Appellate Lawyers Award for Best Brief and The Bernard E. Witkin Award for Excellence In Appellate Advocacy. In 2018, Empire's team won first place in oral argument at the competition, with both of their team members ranked among the top oralists.

In July, 2022, Empire reached an agreement, approved by the State Bar of California Committee of Bar Examiners to become a branch of the Monterey College of Law, pursuant to which it would transition from a for-profit, approved law school, to a non-profit, approved branch of Monterey, while retaining the Empire name.
