= Ron Johnson (wide receiver, born 1958) =

American football player (born 1958)

No. 73, 6, 88, 85
- Position: Wide receiver

Personal information
- Born: September 21, 1958 (age 68); Monterey, California, U.S.
- Listed height: 6 ft 3 in (1.91 m)
- Listed weight: 190 lb (86 kg)

Career information
- High school: Monterey
- College: Monterey Peninsula (1977); Long Beach State (1978–1980)
- NFL draft: 1981: 7th round, 170th overall pick

Career history
- Seattle Seahawks (1981)*; Baltimore Colts (1981)*; Hamilton Tiger-Cats (1982–1984); Portland Breakers (1985); Philadelphia Eagles (1985–1989)
- * Offseason or practice squad member only

Career NFL statistics
- Receptions: 61
- Receiving yards: 1,105
- Receiving touchdowns: 4
- Stats at Pro Football Reference

Ronald J. Johnson (born September 21, 1958) is an American former professional football player who was a wide receiver for five seasons with the Philadelphia Eagles of the National Football League (NFL). He was selected by the Seattle Seahawks in the seventh round of the 1981 NFL draft. He played college football at Monterey Peninsula College and California State University, Long Beach. He also played for the Hamilton Tiger-Cats of the Canadian Football League (CFL) and the Portland Breakers of the United States Football League (USFL).

== Early life and college ==
Ronald J. Johnson was born on September 21, 1958, in Monterey, California, where he attended Monterey High School.

Johnson played college football at Monterey Peninsula College in 1977. He then played for the Long Beach State 49ers of Long Beach State University from 1978 to 1980. He caught eight passes for 170 yards and one touchdown in 1978, 19 passes for 367 yards and four touchdowns in 1979, and 31 passes for 649 yards and ten touchdowns in 1980. His ten touchdowns in 1980 were the most in the Pacific Coast Athletic Association that year.

== Professional career ==
Johnson was selected by the Seattle Seahawks in the seventh round, with the 170th overall pick, of the 1981 NFL draft. He officially signed with the team on June 2. He was waived on August 17, 1981.

Johnson was claimed off waivers by the Baltimore Colts on August 19, 1981. He was released on August 25, 1981.

Johnson signed with the Hamilton Tiger-Cats of the Canadian Football League on March 10, 1982. He dressed in 11 games for the Tiger-Cats in 1982, catching 37 passes for 505 yards and five touchdowns. He dressed in all 16 games during the 1983 season, recording 53 receptions for 914 yards and six touchdowns, as the team finished 5–10–1. Johnson dressed in 15 games in 1984, catching 50 passes for 681 yards and two touchdowns. He became a free agent after the 1984 season.

Johnson was signed by the Portland Breakers of the United States Football League (USFL) on May 15, 1985. He then played in the final six games of the 1985 USFL season, totaling 22 catches for 476 yards and two touchdowns. He was released on July 26, 1985.

Johnson signed with the Philadelphia Eagles on July 22, 1985. He played in eight games for the Eagles in 1985 and caught 11 passes for 186 yards before being placed on injured reserve on November 19, 1985. He was placed on injured reserve again the next year on October 29, 1986, and was promoted to the active roster on November 24, 1986. Overall, Johnson appeared in 12 games in 1986, recording 11 receptions for 207 yards and one touchdown. He became a free agent after the 1986 season and re-signed with the Eagles on August 13, 1987. He played in three games during the strike-shortened 1987 season but did not record any statistics. Johnson was released on August 30, 1988, but re-signed on October 5, 1988, after Mike Quick suffered a broken leg. Johnson played in ten games, starting four, for Philadelphia in 1988, catching 19 passes for 417 yards and two touchdowns. He also played in one postseason game during the 1988 season, catching one pass for 31 yards. He became a free agent after the season again and re-signed with the team on May 1, 1989. Johnson played in an NFL career-high 14 games, starting nine, in 1989 and recorded 20 receptions for 295 yards and one touchdown. His final NFL game was a playoff start in which he caught two passes for 38 yards. He was placed on the reserve/did not report list on August 2, 1990, and became a free agent after the 1990 season.

== Personal life ==
Johnson later became the president and CEO of the Boys & Girls Clubs of Monterey County. His son, Evan, played college football for the BYU Cougars. Another son, Wesley, is a college football coach.
