= Defense Manpower Data Center =

US Department of Defense organization

Agency overview
- Formed: 1974
- Jurisdiction: United States
- Parent department: Department of Defense
- Website: dwp.dmdc.osd.mil

The Defense Manpower Data Center (DMDC) serves under the Office of the Secretary of Defense to collate personnel, manpower, training, financial, and other data for the United States Department of Defense. This data catalogues the history of personnel in the military and their family for purposes of healthcare, retirement funding and other administrative needs. It has offices in Seaside, California, and Alexandria, Virginia.

== History ==
DMDC was established in 1974 as the Manpower Research and Data Analysis Center (MARDAC) and made a DoD tenant activity within the U.S. Navy. In 1976, it was made a Field Activity of the Office of the Assistant Secretary of Defense for Manpower & Reserve Affairs (OASD (M&RA)) and renamed the Defense Manpower Data Center (DMDC). One year later, DMDC was transferred to the Defense Logistics Agency (DLA) for administrative support and in 1991 was designated a Defense Support Activity supported by DLA. While the name and the supporting activity have varied over the years, DMDC's primary function has always been to support the information management needs of the Office of the Under Secretary of Defense for Personnel & Readiness (OUSD (P&R)) and its predecessors.

DMDC was established at a time of great turbulence in the Department of Defense. The Vietnam War had just ended, active military forces and military personnel strengths were being reduced significantly, the Total Force Policy was being initiated, and the All-Volunteer Force era had just begun. To manage through this period, OASD (M&RA) established DMDC to collect and maintain accurate, readily available manpower and personnel data.

In October 2016, the Department of Defense launched an anonymous survey conducted by the DMDC to collect testimonies of sexual assault among the US military personnel.

In January 2017, the Department of Defense allowed 16 million discharged veterans to shop online for discounted military exchange products (effective November 2017). The DMDC was put in charge of creating an application to verify veteran's identities online with the database of the United States Department of Veterans Affairs.

In November 2017, different government entities, including the DMDC, gave different numbers regarding the troops in Syria (from 503 to more than 2,000). As a result, in its April 2018 quarterly report, the Pentagon removed the troops numbers in Iraq, Syria and Afghanistan. The DMDC was reportedly "updating their policy for these reports" and committed to provide these numbers retroactively. The next month, the Pentagon declared there were more than 44,000 US troops around the globe that the DMDC could not track precisely. Following up on this issue, the United States Census Bureau declared that the accuracy of the 2020 census was at risk because deployed troops will be counted as residents of the stateside military installations where they're usually stationed (which will give a serious boost of residents in North Carolina, Kentucky, and other states with major military infrastructure). However, since the November 2017 data glitch, the DMDC cannot release anymore data on temporarily deployed service members, making it impossible for the US Census Bureau to apply this new statistics policy.

== Description ==
The mission of DMDC can be summarized as follows:

- Collect and maintain an archive of automated manpower, personnel, training, and other databases for the Department of Defense,
- Support the information requirements of the OUSD (P&R) and other members of the DoD manpower, personnel, and training communities with accurate, timely, and consistent data,
- Operate DoD-wide personnel programs and conduct research and analysis as directed by the OUSD (P&R).

== Incidents ==
A workplace shooting took place at the DoD Center Monterey Bay, located on the former Fort Ord in June 1997, resulting in the death of a DMDC employee and the wounding of another.

== DS Logon ==
DS Logon (DoD Self-service Logon or DSL) is a secure, self-service logon ID created by the Defense Manpower Data Center as an enterprise identity credential that allows individuals affiliated with the Department of Defense (DoD) or the Department of Veterans Affairs (VA) access to several websites using a single username and password. A DS Logon supports the Personnel Identity Protection (PIP) Directive and National Institute of Standards and Technology (NIST) e-Authentication guidance providing a high level of authentication assurance in situations where Common Access Card (CAC) authentication is not available.
