= List of mayors of Seaside, California =

Mayor of the City of Seaside
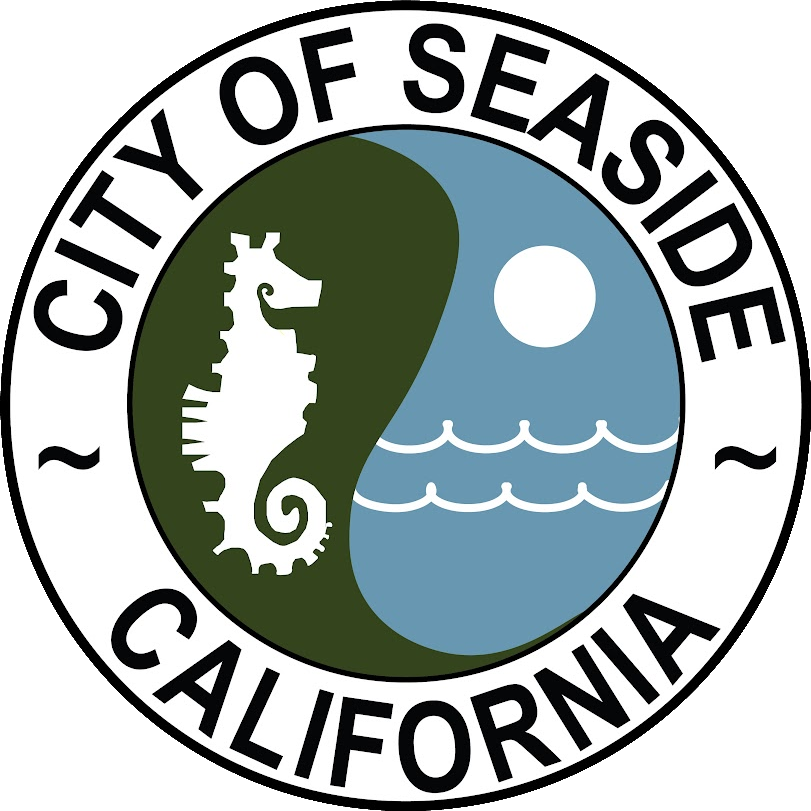
- Seal of the City of Seaside

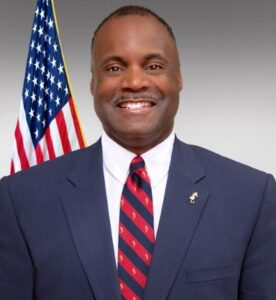
- Incumbent; Ian Oglesby since December 6, 2018
- Term length: 2 years
- Formation: 1954
- First holder: Jack Oldemeyer

Following is a list of mayors of Seaside, California.

Image	Mayor	Years	Notes/Citation
	Jack Oldemeyer	1954–1956	
	George T. "Sarge" Cunningham	1956–1958	
	John Cota	1952–1960	
	Beauford T. Anderson	1960–1962	
	John Cota	1962–1963	
	Beauford T. Anderson	1963–1964	
	John M. Patullo	1964–1966	
	Louis N. Haddad	1966–1972	First Arab-American mayor of Seaside
	B.J. Dolan	1972–1976	
	Oscar Lawson	1976–1978	First African-American mayor
	Stephen E. Ross	1978–1980	
	Glen Olea	1980–1982	First Filipino-American mayor in the United States
	Lancelot McClair	1982–1994	
	Don R. Jordan	1994–1998	
	Jerry C. Smith	1998–2004	
	Ralph Rubio	2004–2010	First Latino-American mayor
	Felix Bachofner	2010–2012	
	Ralph Rubio	2012–2018	
	Ian Oglesby	2018–Present	
