= Seaside, California =

City in California, United States

- City
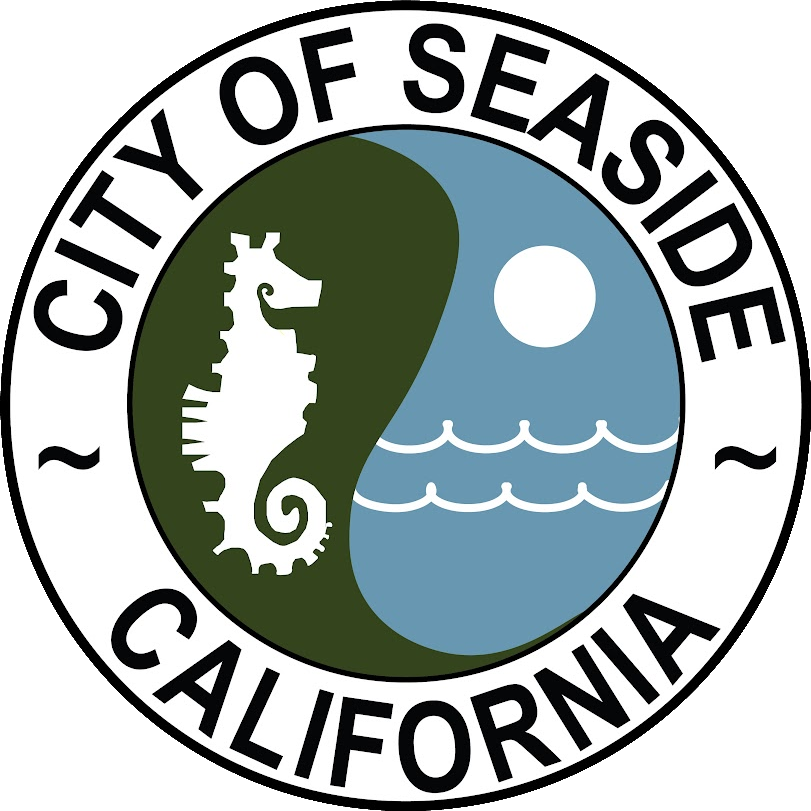
- Seal
- Interactive map of Seaside, California
- Coordinates: 36°36′40″N 121°50′41″W
- Country: United States
- State: California
- County: Monterey
- Founded: 1888
- Incorporated: October 13, 1954

Government
  - Mayor: Ian Oglesby
  - Senate: John Laird (D)
  - Assembly: Dawn Addis (D)
  - U. S. Congress: Jimmy Panetta (D)

Area
  - Total: 9.06 sq mi (23.5 km^{2})
  - Land: 8.92 sq mi (23.1 km^{2})
  - Water: 0.14 sq mi (0.36 km^{2}) 1.51%
- Elevation: 33 ft (10 m)

Population (2020)
  - Total: 32,366
  - Density: 3,627.3/sq mi (1,400.5/km^{2})
- Time zone: UTC-8 (PST)
  - Summer (DST): UTC-7 (PDT)
- ZIP code: 93955
- Area code: 831
- FIPS code: 06-70742
- GNIS feature ID: 1659619
- Website: www.ci.seaside.ca.us

Seaside, formerly East Monterey, is a city in Monterey County, California, United States, with a population of 32,366 as of the 2020 census. It is located 2.25 miles (3.6 km) east-northeast of Monterey, at an elevation of 33 feet (10 m), and is the home of California State University, Monterey Bay (CSUMB), UC MBEST Center, and the Monterey College of Law, which are located on the site of the former military base Fort Ord. Also on the site are the Bayonet and Black Horse golf courses, now open to the public and host to PGA Tour events, including the 2012 PGA Professional National Championship. Seaside is the gateway to Fort Ord National Monument, created on April 20, 2012.

== History ==
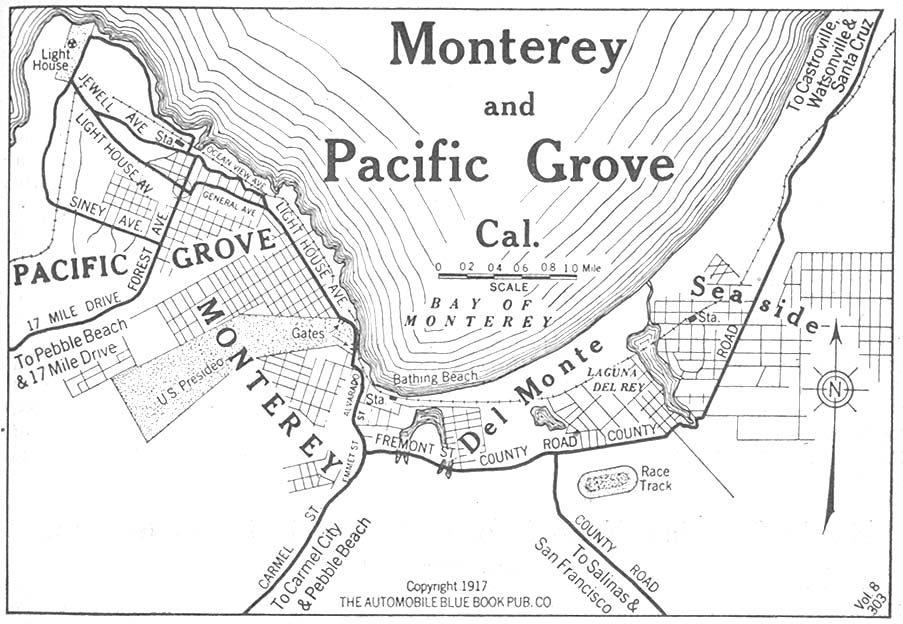
Monterey Bay area in 1917

In 1888, a New Yorker, Dr. John L. D. Roberts, founded, adjacent to Hotel Del Monte in Del Monte, Monterey, California, East Monterey as a subdivision of Monterey, later renamed Seaside, on 160 acres of land purchased from David Houghton, his uncle, as a resort community.

In 1891, the East Monterey post office opened and had a Southern Pacific Railroad stop on the Monterey Branch of the Coast Division.

By 1899, East Monterey had become Seaside. In 1910, Roberts invited the US Army to set up Camp Gigling on a part of his land.

In 1954, Seaside was incorporated now independent of Monterey, with Jack Oldemeyer as its first mayor. In the mid-1960s, over a quarter of the population (6,000 out of 22,000) was African-American, which was the largest concentration of African-Americans between San Francisco and Los Angeles.

== Geography ==
Seaside is located at 36°36′40″N 121°50′41″W, toward the southern end of Monterey Bay. It is bordered to the north by Marina, to the west by Sand City, to the southwest by Monterey, and to the south by Del Rey Oaks. The California State Route 1 freeway runs along the western border of the city, north of Sand City.

According to the United States Census Bureau, the city of Seaside has a total area of 9.1 square miles (24 km^{2}), of which 8.9 square miles (23 km^{2}) are land and 0.1 square miles (0.3 km^{2}), or 1.51%, are water. According to the maps of the United States Geological Survey, the elevation ranges from 0 to 165 meters (0 to 541 feet).

=== Climate ===
The climate is a cool Mediterranean type, strongly influenced by the prevailing winds from the west, which blow over the Pacific Coast's cool ocean currents from Alaska. At the nearest National Weather Service Climate Station, in the City of Monterey at 385 feet (117 m) elevation: The coldest month is January, with an average daily high of 59.9 °F (15.5 °C); the warmest month is September, with an average daily high of 72 °F (22 °C); the average daily low is 43 °F (6 °C) in January and 52.7 °F (11.5 °C) in September; and the average rainfall is 20 inches (51 centimeters) per year, with 90.3% falling during November through April. The weather can be much hotter when the winds blow from the east: Since 1906, there have been 11 days with a high of 100 °F (38 °C) or higher; all 11 days occurred in June, September, or October.

This region experiences warm (but not hot) and dry summers, with no average monthly temperatures above 71.6 °F (22.0 °C). According to the Köppen Climate Classification system, Seaside has a warm-summer Mediterranean climate, abbreviated "Csb" on climate maps.

Climate data for Seaside, California
Month	Jan	Feb	Mar	Apr	May	Jun	Jul	Aug	Sep	Oct	Nov	Dec	Year
Mean daily maximum °F (°C)	59.7 (15.4)	60.9 (16.1)	61.5 (16.4)	62.6 (17.0)	64.4 (18.0)	67.0 (19.4)	68.0 (20.0)	69.4 (20.8)	70.0 (21.1)	68.3 (20.2)	64.1 (17.8)	60.0 (15.6)	64.7 (18.2)
Mean daily minimum °F (°C)	41.3 (5.2)	43.5 (6.4)	44.8 (7.1)	46.3 (7.9)	49.3 (9.6)	51.7 (10.9)	53.6 (12.0)	54.2 (12.3)	52.8 (11.6)	49.5 (9.7)	44.9 (7.2)	41.3 (5.2)	47.8 (8.8)
Average precipitation inches (mm)	3.66 (93)	3.20 (81)	3.21 (82)	1.29 (33)	0.43 (11)	0.19 (4.8)	0.08 (2.0)	0.11 (2.8)	0.26 (6.6)	0.91 (23)	2.13 (54)	2.42 (61)	17.89 (454.2)

== Law and government ==
The City of Seaside is a General Law City with a Council/Manager form of government. The five-member City Council is a legislative and policy-making body that is elected on a nonpartisan basis to represent the residents of Seaside.

The City Manager is appointed by the City Council to manage the daily operations of the city and is responsible for making policy recommendations to the City Council and implementing City Council policy directives.

Policy decisions are made at City Council meetings, which are held on the first and third Thursdays of each month at 5:00 p.m. in the City Council Chambers at City Hall, with special meetings as needed. At these public meetings, the City Council makes policy determinations; approves agreements and contracts; adopts ordinances (local laws) and regulations; and authorizes the expenditure of City funds. The City Council also serves as the board of directors for the Redevelopment Agency of the City Council. Meetings of the Redevelopment Agency are held in concurrence with the City Council Meetings.

== Demographics ==
Historical population
Census	Pop.	Note	%±
1960	19,353		—
1970	36,883		90.6%
1980	36,567		−0.9%
1990	38,901		6.4%
2000	31,696		−18.5%
2010	33,025		4.2%
2020	32,366		−2.0%
U.S. Decennial Census

=== 2020 census ===
As of the 2020 census, Seaside had a population of 32,366 and a population density of 3,627.3 inhabitants per square mile (1,400.5/km^{2}). The median age was 34.0 years. The age distribution was 24.8% under the age of 18, 10.8% from age 18 to 24, 29.6% from age 25 to 44, 22.8% from age 45 to 64, and 12.1% age 65 or older. For every 100 females, there were 96.6 males, and for every 100 females age 18 and over, there were 94.8 males.

The census reported that 96.4% of the population lived in households and 3.6% lived in non-institutionalized group quarters; no one was institutionalized. 100.0% of residents lived in urban areas, while 0.0% lived in rural areas.

There were 10,149 households, of which 40.0% had children under the age of 18 living in them. Of all households, 48.2% were married-couple households, 8.3% were cohabiting-couple households, 16.9% were households with a male householder and no spouse or partner present, and 26.7% were households with a female householder and no spouse or partner present. About 19.7% of all households were one-person households, and 8.6% had someone living alone who was 65 years of age or older. The average household size was 3.07, and there were 7,308 families (72.0% of all households).

There were 10,801 housing units at an average density of 1,210.5 units per square mile (467.4 units/km^{2}). Of all housing units, 94.0% were occupied and 6.0% were vacant. Of occupied units, 40.7% were owner-occupied and 59.3% were occupied by renters. The homeowner vacancy rate was 0.8% and the rental vacancy rate was 4.8%.

Racial composition as of the 2020 census
Race	Number	Percent
White	11,230	34.7%
Black or African American	1,882	5.8%
American Indian and Alaska Native	674	2.1%
Asian	3,135	9.7%
Native Hawaiian and Other Pacific Islander	489	1.5%
Some other race	9,365	28.9%
Two or more races	5,591	17.3%
Hispanic or Latino (of any race)	15,494	47.9%

=== 2023 ACS estimates ===
In 2023, the US Census Bureau estimated that the median household income was $82,303, and the per capita income was $33,614. About 11.5% of families and 14.9% of the population were below the poverty line.

=== 2010 census ===
At the 2010 census Seaside had a population of 33,025. The population density was 3,522.5 inhabitants per square mile (1,360.0/km^{2}). The racial makeup of Seaside was 15,978 (48.4%) White, 2,783 (8.4%) African American, 347 (1.1%) Native American, 3,206 (9.7%) Asian, 529 (1.6%) Pacific Islander, 7,579 (22.9%) from other races, and 2,603 (7.9%) from two or more races. Hispanic or Latino of any race were 14,347 persons (43.4%).

The census reported that 31,898 people (96.6% of the population) lived in households, 1,127 (3.4%) lived in non-institutionalized group quarters, and no one was institutionalized.

There were 10,093 households, 4,408 (43.7%) had children under the age of 18 living in them, 5,232 (51.8%) were opposite-sex married couples living together, 1,433 (14.2%) had a female householder with no husband present, 708 (7.0%) had a male householder with no wife present. There were 727 (7.2%) unmarried opposite-sex partnerships, and 70 (0.7%) same-sex married couples or partnerships. 1,927 households (19.1%) were one person and 697 (6.9%) had someone living alone who was 65 or older. The average household size was 3.16. There were 7,373 families (73.1% of households); the average family size was 3.57.

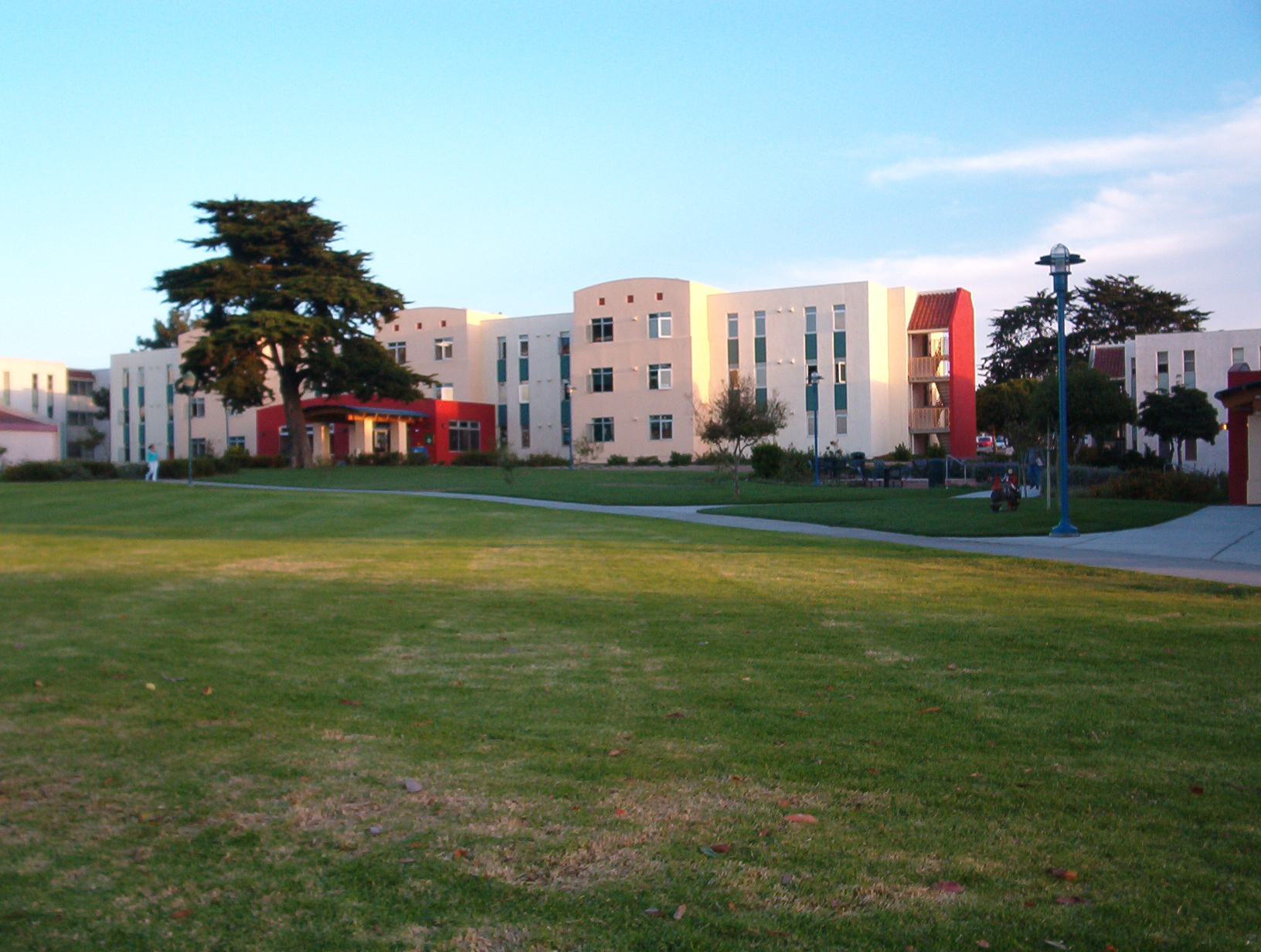
California State University, Monterey Bay (CSUMB) campus

The age distribution was 8,923 people (27.0%) under the age of 18, 4,428 people (13.4%) aged 18 to 24, 10,154 people (30.7%) aged 25 to 44, 6,675 people (20.2%) aged 45 to 64, and 2,845 people (8.6%) who were 65 or older. The median age was 30.6 years. For every 100 females, there were 100.5 males. For every 100 females age 18 and over, there were 99.8 males.

There were 10,872 housing units at an average density of 1,159.6 per square mile, of the occupied units 4,183 (41.4%) were owner-occupied and 5,910 (58.6%) were rented. The homeowner vacancy rate was 2.2%; the rental vacancy rate was 4.9%. 11,979 people (36.3% of the population) lived in owner-occupied housing units and 19,919 people (60.3%) lived in rental housing units.

== Education ==
Seaside High School is home to the 2006 CCS Small-Division Football Championship winners, the Spartans, led by coaches Alfred Avila, Quentin Crosby, Michael Drain, Jeff Quenga, Matt Avila, Pastor Joe Kamp, and Bryan Shaw. The football game between county rival Monterey High School attracts nearly 5,000 people every year. Ron Rivera, head coach of the NFL's Washington Commanders and former linebacker for the Chicago Bears, was a 1980 graduate of Seaside High School.

California State University, Monterey Bay is located in Seaside near Fort Ord and is the second newest campus after CSU Channel Islands. Seaside is also home to Monterey College of Law, a private law school.

Monterey Peninsula College has public safety training center in Seaside that includes a fire and police academy.

== Economy ==
The Defense Manpower Data Center has an office in Seaside, on the former Fort Ord.

== Scribble Hill ==
Scribble Hill (also known as "Message Mountain") is part of Seaside's popular culture. It is a large sand dune near the junction of Fremont Boulevard and State Route 1, technically in Sand City, but adjacent to Seaside High School. People write messages on the dune with ice plant. It is a popular place for birthday messages, wedding proposals, and congratulation messages. Many people climb atop it to view fireworks on July 4. It is also known as "The Big Dune" or "The Dune" or "The Big Sand Hill" or "The Sand Board".

== Bayonet and Black Horse golf courses ==
Bayonet Golf Course, designed in 1954, was built on the Fort Ord military base. It was named after the Army's 7th Infantry division. The course was allegedly designed to play to then-commanding officer Major General Robert B. McClure's terrible slice, and thus has a series of holes nicknamed "Combat Corner" with substantial doglegs. Black Horse, named after the 11th Cavalry, followed in 1964. Until 1997, the golf courses were only open to members of the military; in 1997 it was purchased by the City of Seaside and opened to the public. After several years of renovation, the courses now meet USGA specifications, and have one new and eight redesigned holes. In 2012, these two courses hosted the PGA Professional National Championship Both Bayonet and Black Horse overlook Monterey Bay, and are par 72 courses.

== Notable people ==
- Jamaree Bouyea, basketball player
- Tony Curtis, professional football player
- Herman Edwards, pro football player and football coach; television football analyst
- Mason Foster, professional football player
- Mike Gravel, U.S. senator from Alaska
- Charley Harraway, professional football player
- Melvin T. Mason, city councilman and 1984 presidential candidate (SWP)
- Rachel Roy, fashion designer
