= Monterey High School (Monterey, California) =

- Monterey High Toreadore

Location
- 101 Herrmann Drive; Monterey, California 93940; United States; 36.596°N 121.902°W

Information
- Type: Public
- Established: 1905, 121 years ago
- School district: Monterey Peninsula USD
- Principal: Tom Newton
- Faculty: 68.91 (FTE)
- Grades: 9–12
- Enrollment: 1,326 (2023-2024)
- Student to teacher ratio: 19.24
- Campus type: Suburban
- Colors: Kelly green and Gold
- Athletics conference: CIF – Central Coast Section
- Mascot: Toreador
- Nickname: Toreadores ("Dores")
- Rival: Seaside High School
- Yearbook: El Susurro
- Website: https://montereyhigh.mpusd.net/

Monterey High School is a public high school located in Monterey, California. It is the oldest of the four high schools overseen by the Monterey Peninsula Unified School District.

== History ==
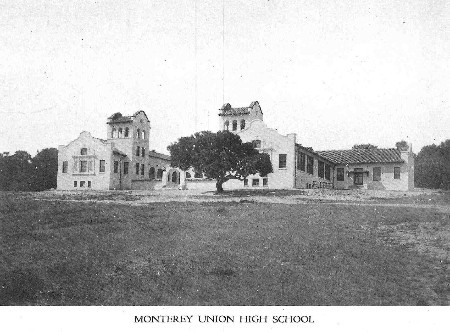
Monterey Union High School in 1917.

In 1905, Monterey High School was combined with Del Monte Technical School to form Monterey Union High School. The wooden three-story building was destroyed by fire and a new school building was constructed on the current site by 1915. The school serviced students from as far north as Castroville to as far south as Big Sur and all of Carmel Valley. The other two districts, Pacific Grove and Carmel, only serviced students within their small city limits.

== Proficiency statistics ==
As of 2020, Monterey High school serves 1,306 students in grade levels 9 through 12. The mathematical proficiency level is 38%, which is lower than California's average of 39%. However, the literacy rate is 65%, which rises above the state average of 50%. MHS ranks among the top 30 schools in the state of California. It also is listed among the top 1% for graduation rates in the state of California.

The student-teacher ratio is 21.1, lower than state average of 23.1.

== Student demographics ==
The school's students are 50% Hispanic, 29% white, 5% black, 5% Asian, 3% Filipino, 1% Pacific Islander, ≤1% Native American and 7% have multiple ethnicities. The student body is 48% female and 52% male.

5% of the school's students are still learning English.

45% of the school's students are from low-income families.

== School colors ==
The school colors of green and gold came from the "golden hills of Mount Toro and the kelly green leaves of the coastal oaks," based on a student poem written for the 1906 yearbook. However, some believe that the school colors came from the original matador's uniform, which was kelly green and gold.

== School songs ==
Two school fight songs have been used in the history of Monterey High School. The current song, which bears the line "Toreadores who wear the green and gold...." was created in 1948 and its music was taken from Georges Bizet's opera Carmen, but the words were written by a student.

The music of the older version was taken from the Washington state fight song.

== The Toreador ==
With the rich Spanish heritage in the city of Monterey, the Toreador was chosen as the school's mascot when it opened in 1905. The original Tony the Toreador caricature served as the face of the school for 80 years. The toreador mascot painted on the wall of the Randall Gym was designed by an art student in the 1990s.

The varsity teams were called the Toreadores, the junior varsity were called the Matadores, the sophomore teams or lightweight teams of earlier years were called the Picadores.

== El Susurro ==
The school's yearbook, originally called The Whisper, was not a traditional yearbook but a collection of student poems and pictures. The title was chosen to reflect the "whisper" of the student voices in their poems. Keeping with the Spanish tradition, the yearbook's name was changed to El Susurro.

== The Galleon ==
The newspaper of Monterey High School is called The Galleon and includes poetry and stories written by the students as well as articles about student life and upcoming courses.

== Gyms ==
The school has two gyms: Randall Gym, which was built in the 1920s, and the smaller Harmon Gym, built in the 1940s. The gyms were named after the late coach Randy Randall and the late P.E. teacher Jean Harmon. The school is also home to the Dan Albert Stadium, named after the longtime Monterey mayor and former football coach.

== Athletics ==
=== Fall ===
Girls: Cross country, Golf, field hockey, water polo, tennis, volleyball, cheerleading

Boys: Football, cross country, water polo

=== Winter ===
Girls: Basketball, soccer, wrestling

Boys: Basketball, soccer, wrestling

=== Spring ===
Girls: Lacrosse, softball, swimming, diving, track and field

Boys: Baseball, golf, lacrosse, swimming, diving, tennis, track and field, volleyball

== Facilities ==
Monterey High School contains 50 classrooms, a library, a lecture room, two gymnasiums, a dance studio, a music building, a cafeteria, a black box theater and an administration building. In 2010, the school district passed a $78 million bond, and funds have been designated to upgrade the school's infrastructure. Renovations were planned for the school's heating system, swimming pool, student bathrooms, counseling office and library and the construction of a college and career counseling center was planned, but the swimming pool, counseling office and college and career center were not built. The district has used general funds to upgrade technology resources across the campus. Additionally, utilizing Measure P bond funds, a $15 million science center was scheduled to be completed by the end of Fall 2020.

== Academies ==
Through the California Partnership Academies program, Monterey High School has three smaller academies for students with talents in fine arts (AMP), oceanographic sciences (MAOS), and sports and athletics (SPARC).

=== AMP ===
The Art, Media, and Performance Academy (AMP) is a college-preparatory academy that teaches students in multiple art fields. The visual art group studies 3D models, the history of art, graphic design and painting. The group creates murals that adorn the walls of the school. AMP is also connected to the dance program and the Monterey High School Players theater program. Students are required to attend theatrical productions and are encouraged to pursue internships at art museums and other organizations. AMP students also make field trips to museums and professional theatrical performances.

=== MAOS ===
The Monterey Academy of Oceanographic Science (MAOS) is a college-preparatory academy for students in mathematic and scientific studies. The mission of MAOS is to prepare students for academic success in college by offering an integrated, hands-on curriculum based on the Monterey Bay region's rich marine environment. Students learn through scientific lab and field activities. Field trips send students to Monterey Bay Aquarium, Moss Landing Marine Laboratories, Naval Postgraduate School, Hopkins Marine Lab, the National Steinbeck Center, Elkhorn Slough, Asilomar State Beach and Del Monte Beach.

=== SPARC ===
The Sports Professions and Recreation Careers Academy (SPARC) is funded by state grants and offers classes in sports, sports medicine and other recreational fields. SPARC reaches out to at-risk students who may not have access to higher education and who may require stronger accountability to succeed. Field trips include those to various technical colleges with prominent programs in athletics and sports medicine.

== Programs ==
Monterey High School offers a number of programs for students to enhance their academic experience.

=== AVID ===
The Advancement Via Individual Determination (AVID) program is designed to help students ready themselves for academic success in college. Its philosophy is to "[h]old students accountable to the highest standards, provide academic and social support, and they will rise to the challenge. "

=== NJROTC ===
The Navy Junior Reserve Officer Training Corps (NJROTC) is a P.E. alternative for students who are interested in the military. The NJROTC curriculum emphasizes citizenship and leadership development, as well as the region's maritime heritage, the significance of sea power and naval topics such as the fundamentals of naval operations, seamanship, navigation and meteorology. NJROTC students attend community-service activities, drill competitions and field meets, and receive marksmanship and other military training.

=== Monterey High School Players ===
The Monterey High School Players are a theatrical group who perform a fall play, three student-directed winter plays and a spring musical every year. In November 2022, the theater building was renamed Welch Theater after a long-time drama teacher, Larry Welch. Along with a 24-hour produced play, multiple staged readings and miniature performances, the group has produced a number of notable alumni.

=== Robotics ===
The Monterey High School robotics team, known as the "Robodores" or "Team 4255," is part of a larger network of robotics teams in high schools and communities across the globe. Robotics competitions are run by the global organization FIRST (For Inspiration and Recognition of Science and Technology). The Robodores finished 34th out of 68 teams at the robotics world championships in Houston in 2019.

== Notable alumni ==
- Mike Aldrete, MLB outfielder (1986–1996) and coach
- Tory Belleci, MythBusters
- Victor Cole, MLB pitcher (1992)
- Jim Colletto, college head football coach at Purdue (1991–1996) and NFL assistant coach
- Claude Crabb, NFL defensive back (1962–1968)
- Nick Cunningham, bobsledder, (placed 12th in the two-man sled at the 2010 Winter Olympics)
- Pete Cutino, all-time winningest college water polo coach in U.S. history
- Herman Edwards, former NFL head coach (2001–2008) and defensive back (1977–1986); former head coach of the Arizona State Sun Devils
- Charley Harraway, NFL running back (1966–1973)
- Pete Incaviglia, MLB player (1986–1998), former manager of the Grand Prairie AirHogs
- Joe Jackson, American football player
- ML Carter, American football player
- Ron Johnson, American football player
- Sabrina Lum, American swimmer who represented Chinese Taipei at the 1988 Summer Olympics
- Leon Panetta, Secretary of Defense (2011–2013), CIA Director (2009–2011), White House Chief of Staff (1994–1997), U.S. congressman (1977–1993)
- Josh Randall, actor
- Nate Wright, NFL defensive back (1969–1980)
- Greg Heydeman, Major League Baseball pitcher for the 1973 Los Angeles Dodgers
- Jimmy Taenaka, actor and USJF Jr. Judo National Champion
- Maurice Mann, former Canadian football wide receiver in the Canadian Football League (CFL). He was drafted by the Cincinnati Bengals in the fifth round of the 2004 NFL Draft.Mann has also been a member of the Cleveland Browns, Miami Dolphins, Seattle Seahawks, Minnesota Vikings, Edmonton Eskimos, Washington Redskins, Hamilton Tiger-Cats, and the Toronto Argonauts.
- Shaumbe Wright Fair RB Washington State University, drafted 1st pick of World leagues Rein Fire
