= Marina, California =

City in California, United States

City of Marina
- City
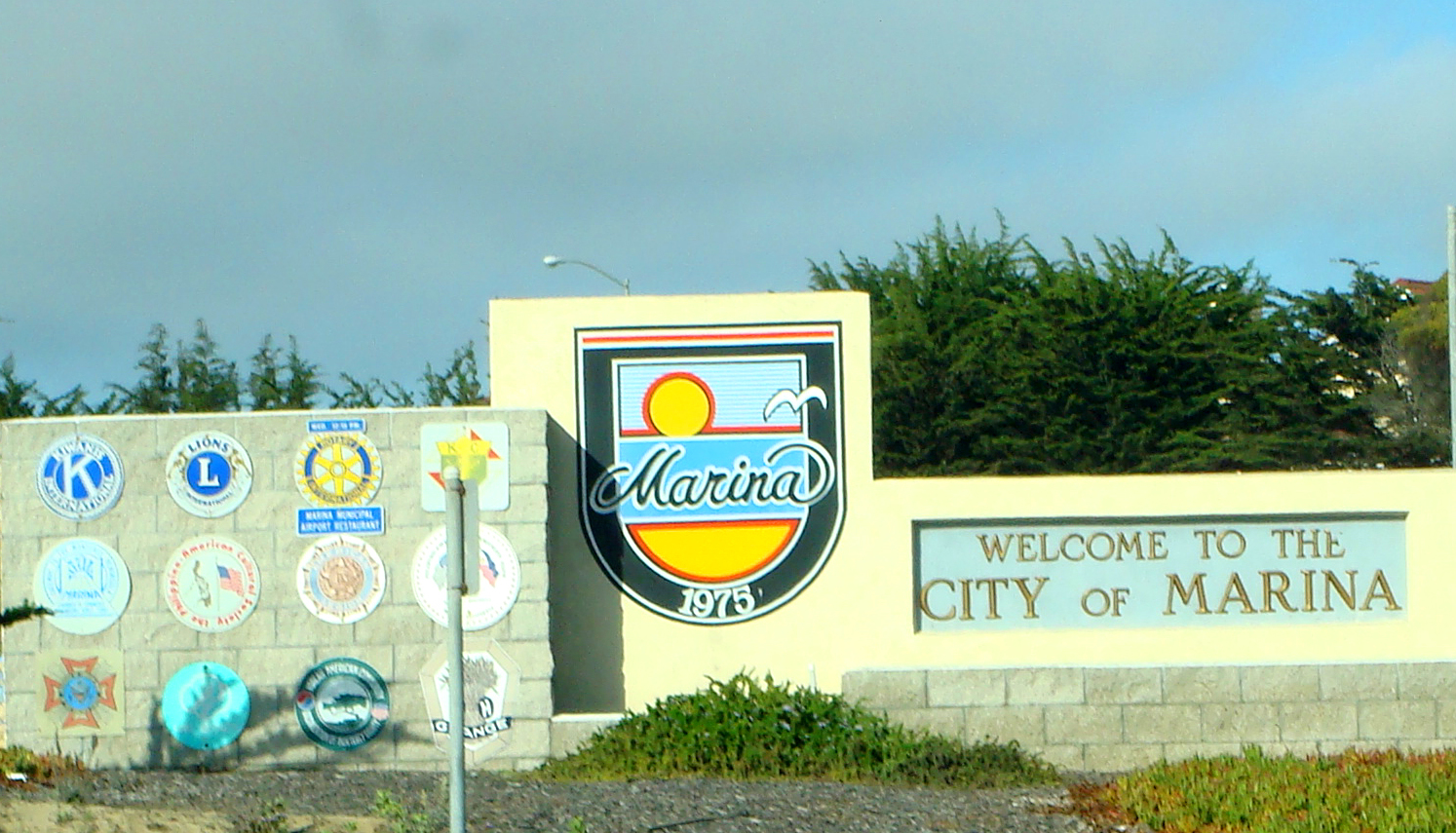
- City of Marina welcome sign
- Interactive map of City of Marina
- Location in the United States
- Coordinates: 36°41′04″N 121°48′08″W
- Country: United States
- State: California
- County: Monterey
- Incorporated: November 13, 1975

Government
  - Mayor: Bruce Delgado (G)
  - State senator: John Laird (D)
  - Assemblymember: Dawn Addis (D)
  - U. S. rep.: Jimmy Panetta (D)

Area
  - Total: 9.81 sq mi (25.4 km^{2})
  - Land: 8.91 sq mi (23.1 km^{2})
  - Water: 0.90 sq mi (2.3 km^{2}) 9.19%
- Elevation: 43 ft (13 m)

Population (2020)
  - Total: 22,359
  - Density: 2,510/sq mi (970/km^{2})
- Time zone: UTC-8 (Pacific)
  - Summer (DST): UTC-7 (PDT)
- ZIP code: 93933
- Area code: 831
- FIPS code: 06-45778
- GNIS feature IDs: 1659061, 2411035
- Website: cityofmarina.org

Marina is a city in Monterey County, California, United States. As of the 2020 census, the population was 22,359, up from 19,718 in 2010. The city is located along the central coast of California, 8 miles (13 km) west of Salinas and 8 miles (13 km) northeast of Monterey. It is on California State Route 1 between Monterey and Santa Cruz and sits at an elevation of 43 feet (13 m).

Marina was incorporated in 1975 and is the newest city in the Monterey area. It includes part of the California State University, Monterey Bay campus, the UC Santa Cruz UC MBEST center, and the Veterans Transition Center (VTC). In 2012, Marina was named one of the 100 Best Communities for Young People by America's Promise Alliance. The Fort Ord Station Veterinary Hospital, built in 1941 to provide healthcare for U.S. Army horses and mules, was listed on the National Register of Historic Places in 2014.

== History ==
William Locke-Paddon founded the town on 1,500 acres (6.1 km^{2}) of land he bought for the purpose. The Marina post office opened in 1916. Marina incorporated in 1975. The city's history is intertwined with that of Fort Ord. Fort Ord lands were used as an infantry training center since the Mexican–American War. Major growth took place in 1938 with the first joint Army and Navy maneuvers held in 1940.

Fort Ord was selected in 1991 for decommissioning, and the post formally closed after troop reassignment in 1994. In July 1994, the California State University, Monterey Bay, began its first academic year, and barracks were soon transformed into dorms.

As a result of base closure, some of the last undeveloped natural wildlands on the Monterey Peninsula are now overseen by the Bureau of Land Management, including 86 miles (138 km) of trails for the public to explore on foot, bike or horseback. In 2012, President Barack Obama designated 14,000 acres (57 km^{2}) of the closed base as a national monument managed by the BLM.

Cemex had a sand mining operation in the city along the Monterey Bay coastline that concerned environmentalists and scientists. The California Coastal Commission in March 2016 issued a Cease and Desist order asking for "administration civil penalties", stating that "the operation is narrowing beaches and impacting environmentally sensitive habitat." Cemex denied the allegations and continued to operate. A settlement was reached in 2017, and CEMEX ended mining in December 2020.

== Geography ==
Unlike most other coastal cities in California, Marina's coastline remains undeveloped and protects rare species of butterflies, buckwheat, and sea lettuce. The city plans to adapt to climate change and sea level rise, based on managed retreat, and has been described as an example for other coastal cities.

== Demographics ==
Historical population
Census	Pop.	Note	%±
1960	3,310		—
1970	8,343		152.1%
1980	20,647		147.5%
1990	26,436		28.0%
2000	25,101		−5.0%
2010	19,718		−21.4%
2020	22,359		13.4%
U.S. Decennial Census

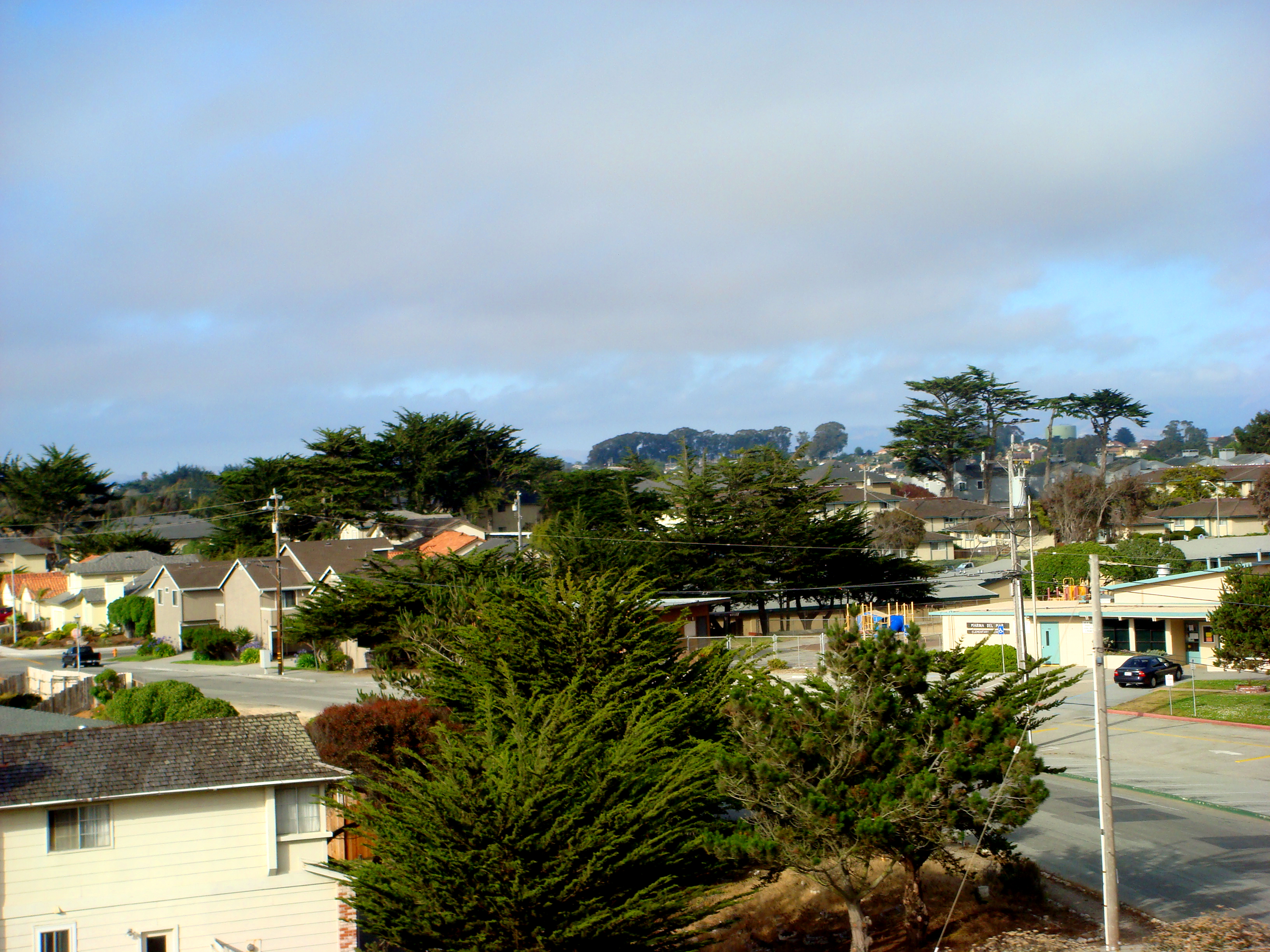
Residential neighborhood

=== 2020 census ===
As of the 2020 census, Marina had a population of 22,359. The population density was 2,510.0 inhabitants per square mile (969.1/km^{2}). The median age was 35.6 years, with 23.7% of residents under age 18, 10.8% aged 18 to 24, 27.1% aged 25 to 44, 23.8% aged 45 to 64, and 14.6% aged 65 or older. For every 100 females there were 90.4 males, and for every 100 females age 18 and over there were 88.4 males.

The census reported that 92.6% of residents lived in households, 7.2% lived in non-institutionalized group quarters, and 0.2% were institutionalized. 99.8% of residents lived in urban areas, while 0.2% lived in rural areas.

There were 7,608 households, of which 33.6% had children under the age of 18 living in them. Of all households, 44.2% were married-couple households, 8.4% were cohabiting-couple households, 17.8% had a male householder with no spouse or partner present, and 29.6% had a female householder with no spouse or partner present. About 23.6% of all households were made up of individuals, and 9.7% had someone living alone who was 65 years of age or older. The average household size was 2.72. There were 5,108 families (67.1% of all households).

There were 8,022 housing units at an average density of 900.5 units per square mile (347.7 units/km^{2}), of which 7,608 (94.8%) were occupied. Of the occupied units, 43.8% were owner-occupied and 56.2% were occupied by renters. The homeowner vacancy rate was 0.4% and the rental vacancy rate was 3.7%.

Racial composition as of the 2020 census
Race	Number	Percent
White	8,441	37.8%
Black or African American	1,356	6.1%
American Indian and Alaska Native	304	1.4%
Asian	4,221	18.9%
Native Hawaiian and Other Pacific Islander	507	2.3%
Some other race	3,793	17.0%
Two or more races	3,737	16.7%
Hispanic or Latino (of any race)	7,204	32.2%

=== 2023 ACS 5-year estimates ===
In 2023, the US Census Bureau estimated that 21.7% of the population were foreign-born. Of all people aged 5 or older, 62.3% spoke only English at home, 20.7% spoke Spanish, 3.8% spoke other Indo-European languages, 12.0% spoke Asian or Pacific Islander languages, and 1.3% spoke other languages. Of those aged 25 or older, 89.2% were high school graduates and 36.1% had a bachelor's degree.

The median household income in 2023 was $88,518, and the per capita income was $39,382. About 10.5% of families and 14.6% of the population were below the poverty line.

=== 2010 census ===
At the 2010 census Marina had a population of 19,718. The population density was 2,019.6 inhabitants per square mile (779.8/km^{2}). The racial makeup of Marina was 8,904 (45.1%) White, 1,487 (7.5%) African American, 140 (0.7%) Native American, 2,931 (9.9%) Asian, 544 (2.8%) Pacific Islander, 2,738 (13.9%) from other races, and 1,974 (10.0%) from two or more races. Hispanic or Latino of any race were 5,372 persons (27.2%).

The census reported that 18,827 people (95.5% of the population) lived in households, 891 (4.5%) lived in non-institutionalized group quarters, and no one was institutionalized.

There were 6,845 households, 2,517 (36.8%) had children under the age of 18 living in them, 3,126 (45.7%) were opposite-sex married couples living together, 1,128 (16.5%) had a female householder with no husband present, 417 (6.1%) had a male householder with no wife present. There were 517 (7.6%) unmarried opposite-sex partnerships. 1,587 households (23.2%) were one person and 553 (8.1%) had someone living alone who was 65 or older. The average household size was 2.75. There were 4,671 families (68.2% of households); the average family size was 3.26.

The age distribution was 4,773 people (24.2%) under the age of 18, 2,543 people (12.9%) aged 18 to 24, 5,188 people (26.3%) aged 25 to 44, 4,970 people (25.2%) aged 45 to 64, and 2,244 people (11.4%) who were 65 or older. The median age was 34.0 years. For every 100 females, there were 92.8 males. For every 100 females age 18 and over, there were 88.5 males.

There were 7,200 housing units at an average density of 737.5 per square mile, of the occupied units 2,963 (43.3%) were owner-occupied and 3,882 (56.7%) were rented. The homeowner vacancy rate was 2.4%; the rental vacancy rate was 3.6%. 7,857 people (39.8% of the population) lived in owner-occupied housing units and 10,970 people (55.6%) lived in rental housing units.

The military has been a significant part of life in Marina, which is located adjacent to the former Fort Ord, a US Army installation which closed in 1994 during the country's base closure initiative. Many former and retired military personnel reside in the city. The American Legion and the Veterans of Foreign Wars are active organizations. The Veterans Transition Center is instrumental in placing numerous US and state flags along Del Monte Blvd. and Reservation Road during the various holidays and special events, creating an "avenue of flags."

== Parks and recreation ==
The Labor Day Parade & Family Festival held the Saturday before the official holiday pays homage to the significant military history of the town.

The annual Otter Fest in August welcomes back students, staff, and faculty to CSU, Monterey Bay. It began in 2010 with a Key to the City presentation to the campus president. It is named after the university's otter mascot.

Earth Day is celebrated in April as a community work party to maintain and improve Locke-Paddon Park. Citizens for Sustainable Marina is the lead planning group for the event.

=== Marina State Beach ===
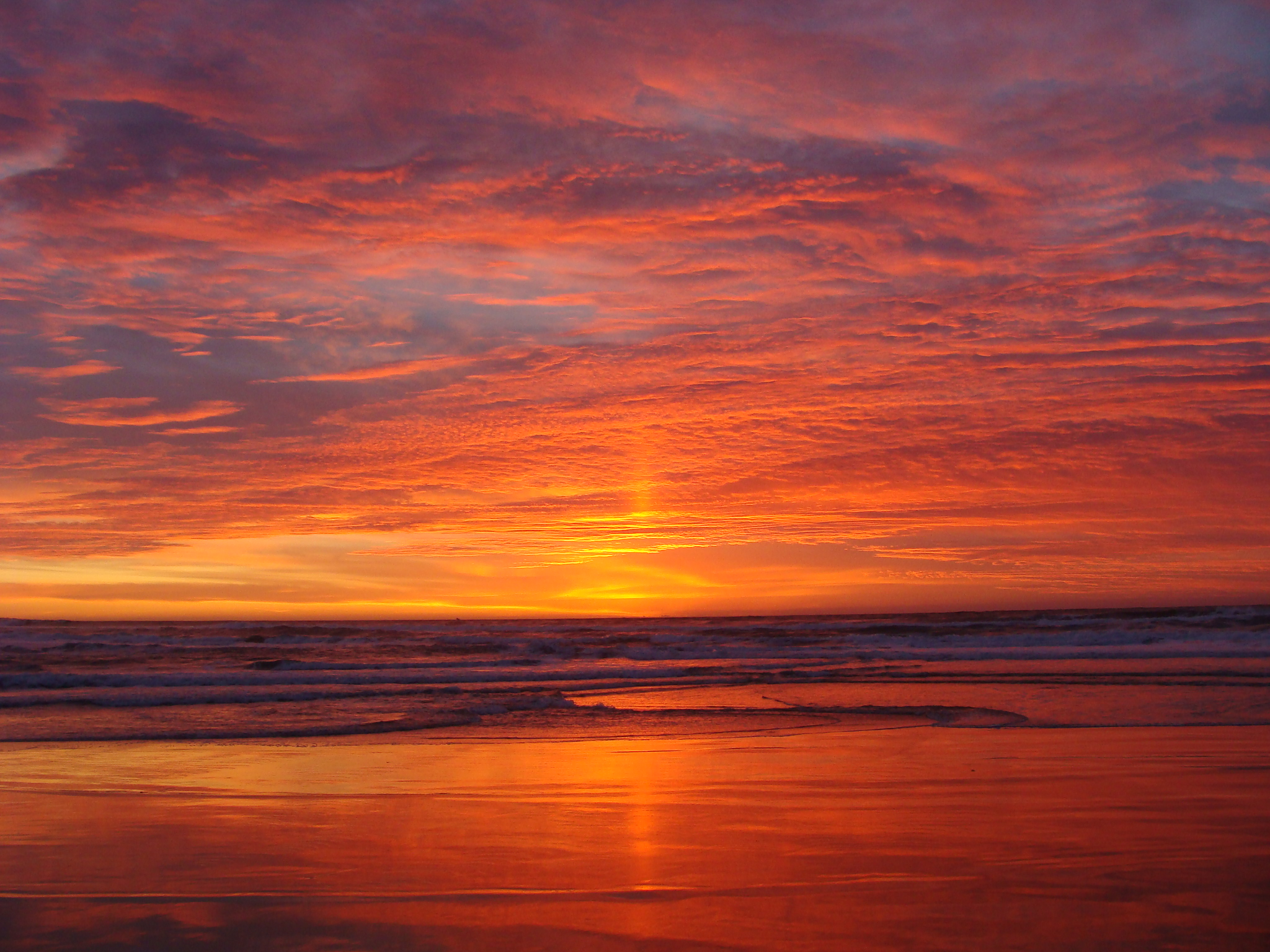
Monterey Bay sunset near Marina State Beach

Marina State Beach is a windswept beach area between State Route 1 and Monterey Bay where water recreation, hang gliding and paragliding are popular. There is a boardwalk through the Marina Dunes Natural Preserves.

=== Fort Ord Dunes State Park ===
Fort Ord Dunes State Park opened in March 2009 and was formerly an Army practice firing range. Much of the park is located in the neighboring town of Seaside, California. Access for the park is located in Marina. Fort Ord Dunes State Park is a popular place for horseback riding, hiking, fishing and cycling. Fort Ord Dunes State Park abuts Marina State Beach.

=== Air Sports ===
Marina is a popular destination for air sports enthusiasts. The tall sand dunes at Marina beaches provide optimal conditions for paragliding and hang gliding. A Marina based skydiving center has become a popular attraction because of its high altitude skydives and proximity to the beach.

== Infrastructure ==
Marina Municipal Airport is a general aviation airport that is owned by the City of Marina. Skydive Monterey Bay conducts skydiving and parachuting activities on the south east side of the airport. In 2021, a manufacturing facility for Joby Aviation was approved at the airport. Joby Aviation is a California-based venture-backed aerospace company, developing an electric vertical takeoff and landing (eVTOL) aircraft that it intends to operate as an air taxi service.

== Education ==
Most areas of Marina are served by the Monterey Peninsula Unified School District.

== Notable people ==
- Retired Buffalo Bills linebacker Ty Powell is from Marina.
- Ron Rivera, former NFL head coach of the Washington Commanders and former head coach of the Carolina Panthers, lived in Marina during his high school years.

== See also ==
- Coastal California
- List of school districts in Monterey County, California
- List of tourist attractions in Monterey County, California
